= Leinfelden station =

Railway station in Leinfelden-Echterdingen, Germany

Leinfelden
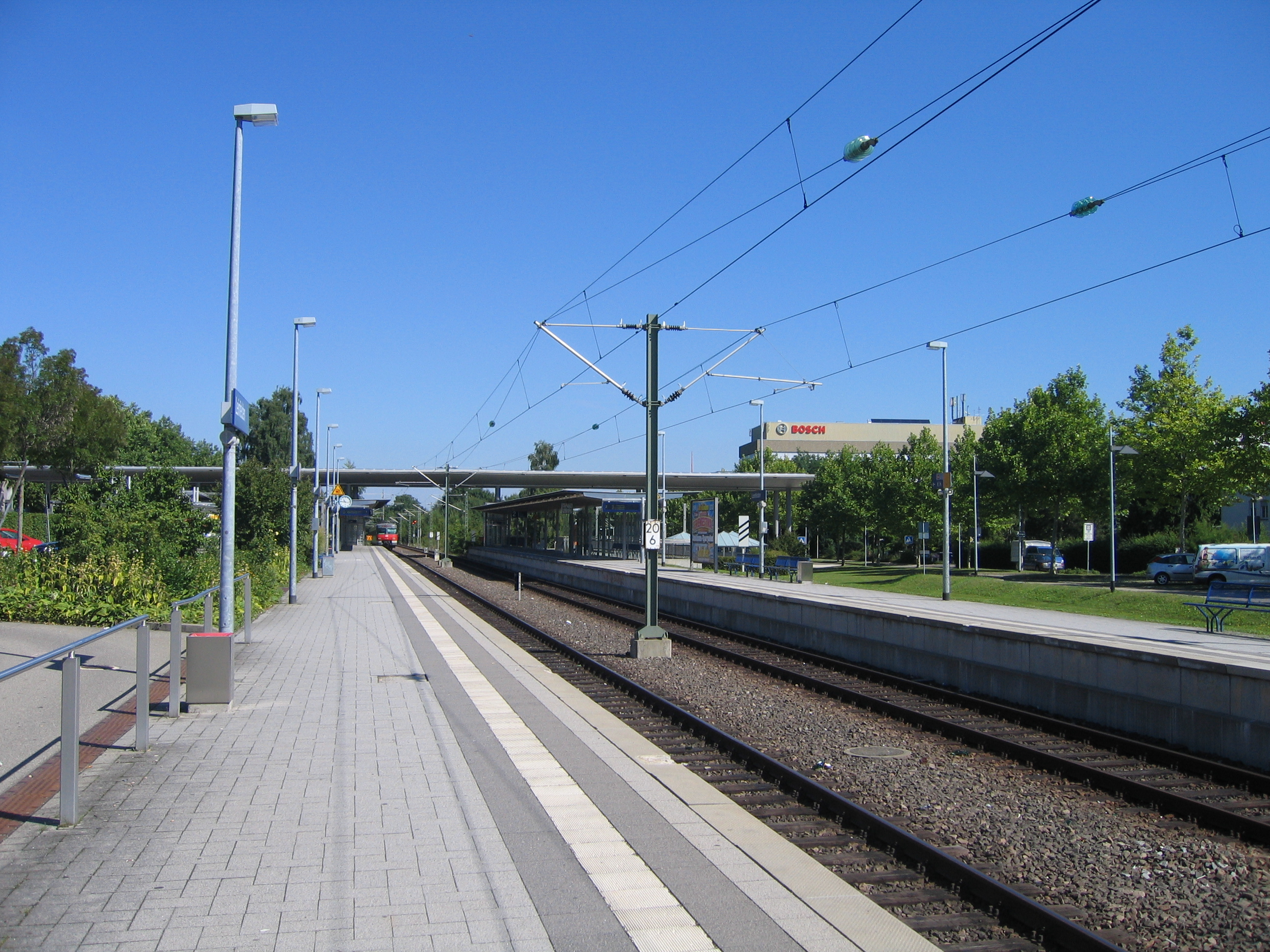
- 2010

General information
- Location: Leinfelden-Echterdingen, Baden-Württemberg; Germany
- Coordinates: 48°41′47″N 9°8′33″E
- Owner: DB Netz
- Operator: DB Station&Service
- Lines: Stuttgart-Rohr–Filderstadt railway (KBS 790.2-3); Siebenmühlental Railway (1928–1972); Möhringen–Neuhausen (1920–1983)
- Platforms: 2 side platforms
- Tracks: 2
- Train operators: S-Bahn Stuttgart
- Connections: S 2 S 3

Construction
- Accessible: Yes

Other information
- Station code: 3626
- DS100 code: TLF
- IBNR: 8003622
- Category: 4
- Fare zone: : 2; naldo: 512 (VVS transitional tariff)
- Website: www.bahnhof.de

History
- Opening: 1 October 1920
- Closed: 1 August 1955

Key dates
- 1993: Reactivated 18 April 1993

Services
Preceding station	Stuttgart S-Bahn	Following station
Echterdingen towards Filderstadt	S2	Oberaichen towards Schorndorf
Echterdingen towards Flughafen/Messe	S3	Oberaichen towards Backnang
Location

Leinfelden station is located in Leinfelden-Echterdingen at the 20.6 kilometre point of the Stuttgart-Rohr–Filderstadt railway in the German state of Baden-Württemberg and is a station on the Stuttgart S-Bahn network.

From 23 June 1928 to 1 October 1971, Leinfelden was at the junction of the Siebenmuehlental Railway (dismantled 1972) and the Rohr–Neuhausen line. Passenger services ended on both lines on 22 May 1955. Freight traffic ran only to Musberg from 1 October 1956.

== History ==
Deutsche Reichsbahn opened the Rohr–Echterdingen railway on 1 October 1920. Leinfelden station was located north and outside of the village of Leinfelden, which had about 1,000 inhabitants. The former two-storey station building, which had a hipped roof no longer exists. The exterior facade of the upper floor was covered with shakes.

Also on 1 October 1920, the Städtische Filderbahn (Municipal Filder Railway, SFB) took over operations of the section of standard-gauge track from Unteraichen to Leinfelden. In return, it closed the Unteraichen–Echterdingen section. Facing competition from the Reichsbahn, the SFB closed all traffic on the Möhringen–Leinfelden route on 25 December 1922.

Passenger services to Vaihingen failed to attract the expected traffic. The municipalities of Echterdingen, Leinfelden therefore negotiated with the city of Stuttgart, the Reichsbahn and the Stuttgarter Straßenbahnen (Stuttgart Tramways, SSB). They asked for the reactivation (and conversion to metre gauge, so that it could be connected to the Stuttgart tramway) and electrification of the line to Möhringen and its extension to Echterdingen. Construction began in the spring of 1927, after all the parties had agreed. The Interurban to Leinfelden was completed on 2 January 1928. The SFB was acquired by the SSB on 1 January 1934.

After a long construction period, the Reichsbahn inaugurated the Leinfelden–Waldenbuch railway on 23 June 1928. The city of Stuttgart had previously planned to build the line as a metre gauge railway to Tübingen. A Rollbock pit was established in Leinfelden for transferring standard gauge freight wagons to and from the metre gauge tracks.

The district suffered a heavy air attack from 15 to 16 March 1944. The station building was destroyed. From early April to late May and in early October 1944, the Wehrmacht stationed a railway-mounted anti-aircraft battery near the station, which was intended to defend the airport and Stuttgart.

=== Deutsche Bundesbahn period ===
After the Second World War, a simple single-storey station building was erected. Deutsche Bundesbahn recorded a decline in passenger numbers on the Stuttgart-Rohr–Neuhausen and Siebenmuehlental railways. It decided to close both routes. This occurred to the Siebenmuehlental railway on 22 May 1955 and on the Stuttgart-Rohr–Neuhausen railway on 1 August 1955. The lines remained open for freight transport for the time being.

Leinfelden developed in the 1950s and 1960s as an emerging residential community. The population increased sharply. On 26 April 1965, the Interior Ministry declared Leinfelden to be a town under the municipality law. To make room for a proper centre for the developing town, there was a contest for ideas. It was decided that the new Leinfelden centre would be built on a large part of the station area. The tram line would run underground in the future. On 1 January 1975, the town of Leinfelden and the municipalities of Echterdingen, Musberg and Stetten auf den Fildern were joined together as the town of Leinfelden-Echterdingen. After the union, the town rejected the administration's original plans and proposed a new town centre between Leinfelden and Echterdingen.

Deutsche Bundesbahn planned the reactivation of Leinfelden station for the planned Stuttgart S-Bahn. In preparation for the S-Bahn, they rebuilt the old station precinct and demolished the station building.

On 1 November 1990, the SSB tramline to Leinfelden was absorbed into the Stuttgart Stadtbahn network and the line to Echterdingen was closed. On 18 April 1993. Deutsche Bundesbahn opened the Oberaichen–Airport section of S-Bahn lines S 2 and S 3.

=== Construction ===
In the late 1980s, Deutsche Bundesbahn considered two options for the siting of the station. One was the site that was eventually realised, the other would have created platforms to the north of the current large underpass north of the station. This would have created an access to the Filderhalle. South of it there would have been a siding to the nearby Robert Bosch GmbH factory.

The southern option was chosen. Because the mayor wanted to make the new building an attraction, he objected to the planned 5.5 metre wide pedestrian tunnel. He decided instead to build an 11.5 metre wide underpass. This created a connection between Marktstraße and Max-Lang-Straße. It has an 80-metre-long canopy that makes the structure visible from a considerable distance. The cost of the tunnel and the roof was borne by the municipality.

A freight yard was planned at Max-Lang-Straße with a loading road and sidings for the Bosch company, but it was not built. An unused bridge over the underpass forms part of the original plan.

== Rail operations ==
Leinfelden station is served by lines S 2 and S 3 of the Stuttgart S-Bahn. Platform track 1 is used by services towards Flughafen/Messe (Airport/Fairground). Track 2 is used by S-Bahn services towards Rohr. The station is classified by Deutsche Bahn as a category 4 station.

== S-Bahn ==
Line	Route
S 2	Schorndorf – Weinstadt – Waiblingen – Bad Cannstatt – Hauptbahnhof – Schwabstraße – Vaihingen – Rohr – Leinfelden – Flughafen/Messe – Filderstadt (extra trains in the peak between Schorndorf and Vaihingen.)
S 3	Backnang – Winnenden – Waiblingen – Bad Cannstatt – Hauptbahnhof – Vaihingen – Rohr – Leinfelden – Flughafen/Messe (extra trains in the peak between Backnang and Vaihingen).

== Stadtbahn ==
Stadtbahn line U 5 begins and ends at the nearby Leinfelden Bahnhof stop.

Line	Route
U5	Leinfelden – Möhringen – Degerloch – Hauptbahnhof – Killesberg
