= Oberaichen station =

Railway station in Leinfelden-Echterdingen, Germany

Oberaichen
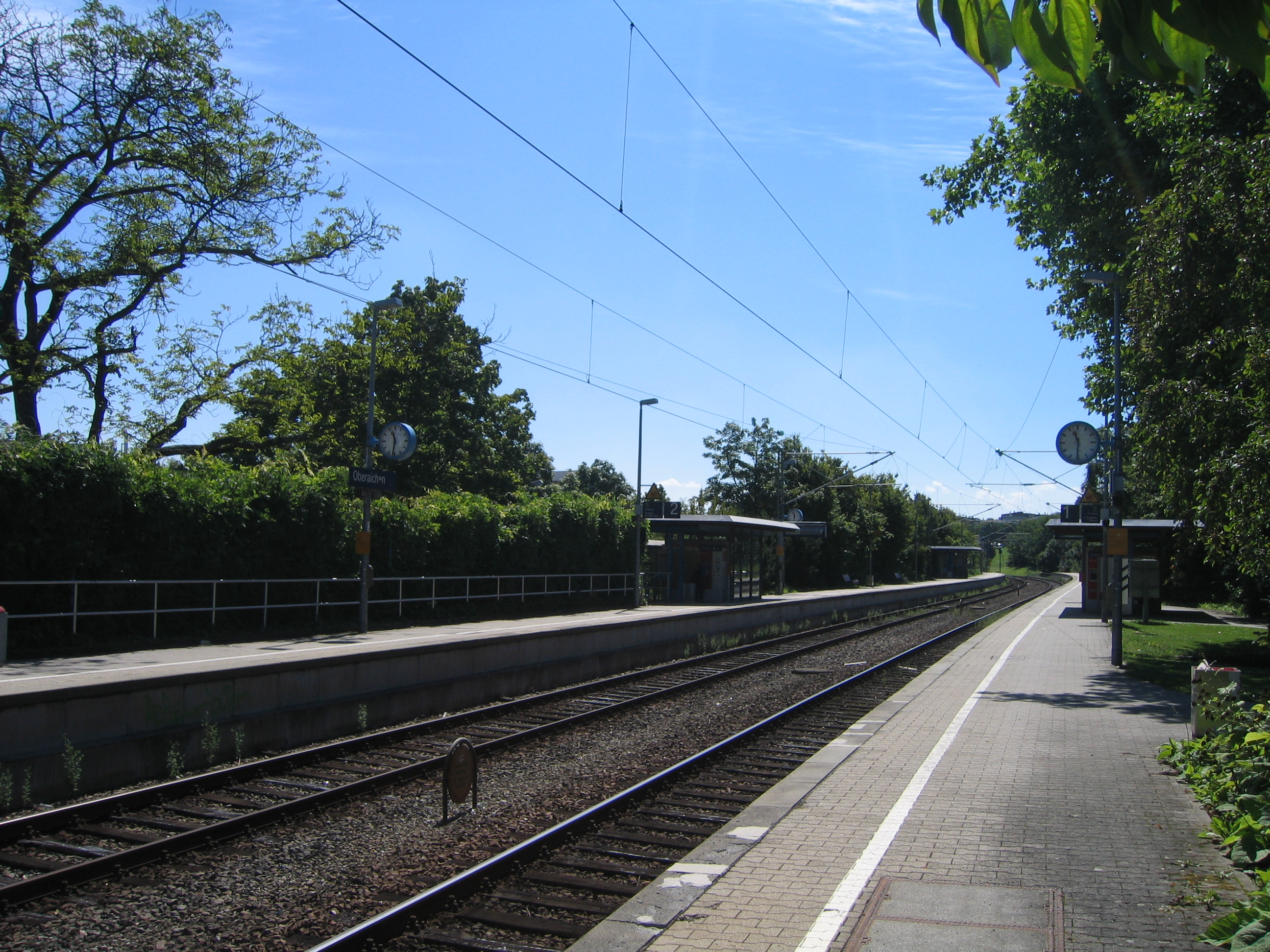

General information
- Location: Rohrerstrasse, Leinfelden-Echterdingen, Baden-Württemberg; Germany
- Coordinates: 48°42′18″N 9°7′39″E
- Owner: DB Netz
- Operator: DB Station&Service
- Lines: Stuttgart-Rohr–Filderstadt railway (KBS 790.2-3)
- Platforms: 2 side platforms
- Tracks: 2
- Train operators: S-Bahn Stuttgart
- Connections: S 2 S 3

Construction
- Accessible: Yes

Other information
- Station code: 4617
- DS100 code: TOAI
- IBNR: 8004496
- Category: 5
- Fare zone: : 2
- Website: www.bahnhof.de

History
- Opened: 1 October 1920; 29 May 1989 (reactivated)
- Closed: 1 August 1955

Services
Preceding station	Stuttgart S-Bahn	Following station
Leinfelden towards Filderstadt	S2	Rohr towards Schorndorf
Leinfelden towards Flughafen/Messe	S3	Rohr towards Backnang
Location

Oberaichen station is located in Leinfelden-Echterdingen at the 18.9 kilometre point of the Stuttgart-Rohr–Filderstadt railway in the German state of Baden-Württemberg and is a station on the Stuttgart S-Bahn network.

== History ==
On 1 October 1920, Deutsche Reichsbahn opened a railway line from Rohr to Echterdingen. It branched off the Gäu Railway (German: Gäubahn) south of Rohr off and ran through the Dürrlewang forest to Oberaichen. The station was placed at the crossing of the road to Unteraichen (now called Raiffeisenstraße), which was then 19 kilometres from Stuttgart Central Station. It was equipped with a simple wooden shelter. The Zum Bahnhof restaurant opened opposite the station in about 1927.

After other Filderstadt villages had been connected by tram and bus to Stuttgart, Degerloch and Esslingen, the new railway proved to be unprofitable within 20 years of its opening. The last train ran to Neuhausen on 1 August 1955.

=== Reactivation ===
When designing a new regional transport concept for Stuttgart and the surrounding area in the 1960s, transport engineer Professor Walter Lambert planned the partial reactivation of the railway to create a rail link to Stuttgart Airport. The implementation of his proposal began in 1984.

The track was partially relaid through the Dürrlewang forest. It was duplicated and electrified. As the completion of the Leinfelden–airport section was delayed, the town council of Leinfelden-Echterdingen asked Deutsche Bundesbahn to open the S-Bahn as soon as possible, at least as far as Oberaichen. This led to an increase in the operating costs to be financed by the state of Baden-Württemberg.

On 29 May 1989, S-Bahn line S2 was opened to Oberaichen, initially as single-track line. A newly established bus route linked the rest of the town of Leinfelden-Echterdingen with the station. Four years later, on 18 April 1993, the line was extended to Stuttgart Airport station, which became the terminus of the line.

== Rail operations ==
Oberaichen station is served by lines S 2 and S 3 of the Stuttgart S-Bahn. Platform track 1 is used by services towards Rohr. Track 2 is used by S-Bahn services towards Flughafen/Messe (Airport/Fairground). The station is classified by Deutsche Bahn as a category 5 station.

=== S-Bahn ===
Line	Route
S 2	Schorndorf – Weinstadt – Waiblingen – Bad Cannstatt – Hauptbahnhof – Schwabstraße – Vaihingen – Rohr – Oberaichen – Flughafen/Messe – Filderstadt (extra trains in the peak between Schorndorf and Vaihingen.)
S 3	Backnang – Winnenden – Waiblingen – Bad Cannstatt – Hauptbahnhof – Vaihingen – Rohr – Oberaichen – Flughafen/Messe (extra trains in the peak between Backnang and Vaihingen).
