= Echterdingen station =

Railway station in Leinfelden-Echterdingen, Baden-Württemberg, Germany

Echterdingen
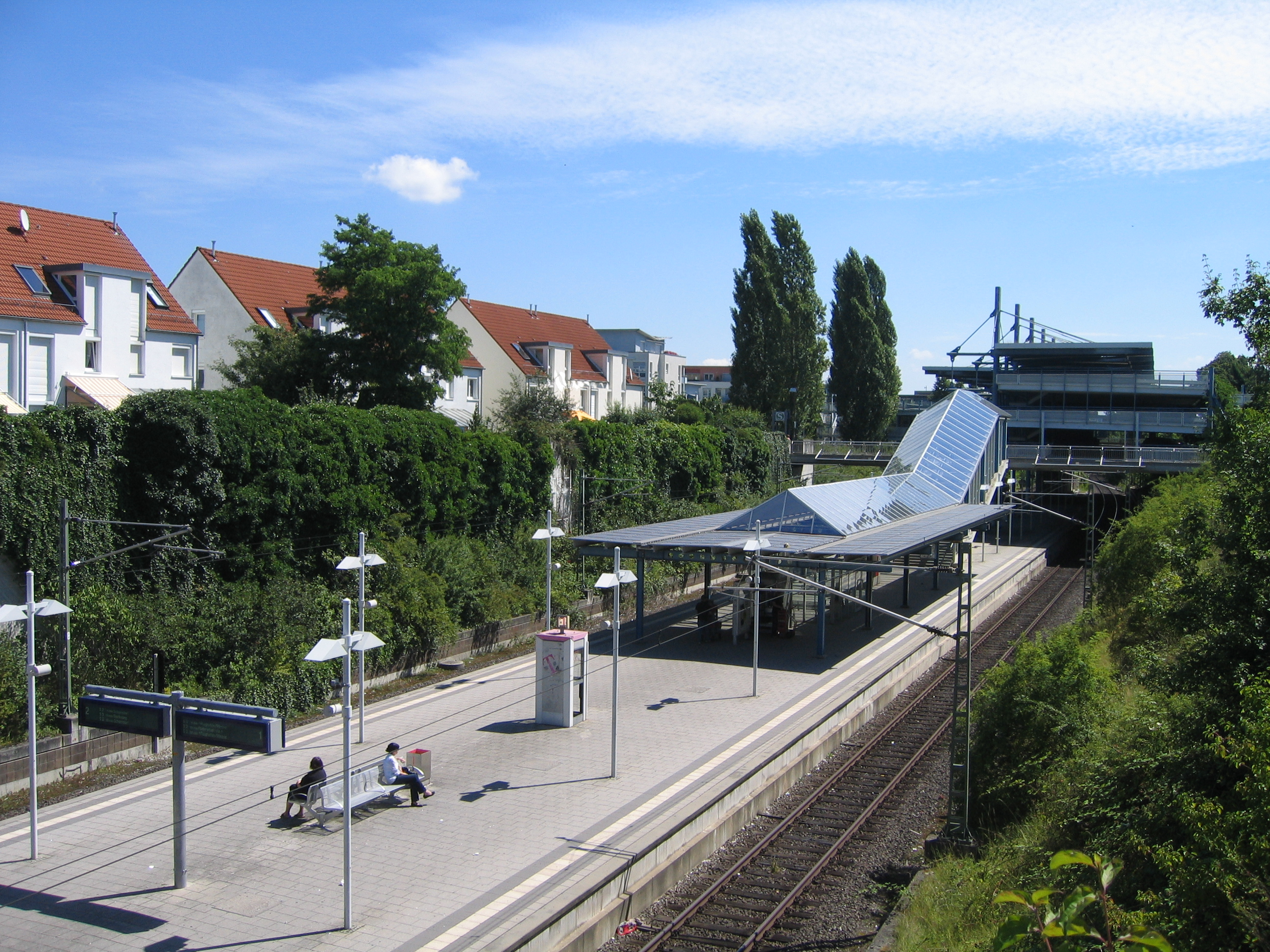

General information
- Location: Filderbahnstrasse, Leinfelden-Echterdingen, Baden-Württemberg; Germany
- Coordinates: 48°41′31″N 9°10′10″E
- Lines: Stuttgart-Rohr–Filderstadt railway (KBS 790.2-3); Former Stuttgart-Möhringen–Neuhausen line
- Platforms: 1 island platform
- Tracks: 2
- Train operators: S-Bahn Stuttgart
- Connections: S 2 S 3

Construction
- Accessible: Yes

Other information
- Station code: 1451
- DS100 code: TETD
- IBNR: 8001650
- Category: 4
- Fare zone: : 2; naldo: 512 (VVS transitional tariff)
- Website: www.bahnhof.de

History
- Opened: 23 December 1897; 18 April 1993 (reactivated)
- Closed: 1 August 1955

Services
Preceding station	Stuttgart S-Bahn	Following station
Flughafen/Messe towards Filderstadt	S2	Leinfelden towards Schorndorf
Flughafen/Messe Terminus	S3	Leinfelden towards Backnang
Location

Echterdingen station is located in Leinfelden-Echterdingen at the 22.7 kilometre point of the Stuttgart-Rohr–Filderstadt railway in the German state of Baden-Württemberg and is a station on the Stuttgart S-Bahn network.

== History ==
Echterdingen's first rail connection was made on 12 December 1888, with opening by the Filder Railway Company (Filderbahn-Gesellschaft) of the Degerloch–Möhringen–Hohenheim metre gauge steam tramway. The station was in the Möhringen district, near the Gasthof Landhaus (country house inn), at the junction of the road from Degerloch to Echterdingen and the road from Möhringen to Plieningen. It was about four kilometres north of the town of Echterdingen. A refuge was established for travellers from Echterdingen.

On 22 August 1891, planning began on a new route from Möhringen to Echterdingen, construction of which was approved by the Ministry of Foreign Affairs on 14 April 1896. The metre gauge railway was extended from Echterdingen to Neuhausen. Their formal opening was held on 23 December 1897, with regular operations beginning the next day. The Echterdingen station on the Möhringen–Hohenheim line was renamed Landhaus, also on 24 December 1897. Today, there is a stop on the Stuttgart Stadtbahn network with this name. Due to the relaying of route in 1906, the existing station is located further south than the original station.

The Echterdinger station building no longer exists. It was a Württemberg station of type IIIa with a long freight shed. It was similar to the original station building in Bernhausen, which still exists at Filderstadt station. On the ground floor there was a service room and two waiting rooms and there were apartments on the two upper floors. Möhringen–Neuhausen was regauged as a standard gauge line on 1 November 1902.

=== Route acquisition and decommissioning ===
Deutsche Reichsbahn opened the Rohr–Echterdingen railway on 1 October 1920. It acquired the Echterdingen–Neuhausen section from the city of Stuttgart, which had taken over the Filder Railway. At the same time it acquired the connection from Unteraichen to Echterdingen from the Städtische Filderbahn (Municipal Filder Railway, SFB). In return, the SFB took over the line from Unteraichen to Leinfelden in 1922, which it operated as a passenger line.

Passenger services to Vaihingen failed to attract the expected traffic. The municipalities of Echterdingen, Leinfelden therefore negotiated with the city of Stuttgart, the Reichsbahn and the Stuttgarter Straßenbahnen (Stuttgart Tramways, SSB) concerning the connection to Möhringen. Construction began in the spring of 1927 and the initial interurban tramway terminus was established at Echterdingen on 31 March 1928. As a result, the Reichsbahn railway steadily lost importance until Deutsche Bundesbahn closed passenger services on the line on 1 August 1955.

=== Reactivation ===
When designing a new regional transport concept for Stuttgart and the surrounding area in the 1960s, transport engineer, Professor Walter Lambert advocated the reactivation of the Stuttgart-Rohr–Echterdingen railway and extending it to Stuttgart Airport.

Deutsche Bundesbahn began duplication and electrification in 1984. The work took longer than planned and was completed on 18 April 1993. The old station building was demolished and the new station was built as in a cut and cover structure in order to allow the construction of a new road to the airport without a level crossing and to reduce noise. A new bus station with six bus platforms (including two on the main road) was built to the west of Filderbahnstraße. Two entrances were built to the station, which has a central platform. Platform stairs give access to Burgstraße and connect with Filderbahnstraße, Ziegeleistraße and the residential area of Gärtlesäckern (which was still undeveloped in 1993). East of it there is a parking garage, which spans the two tracks.

The parking garage built at the beginning of the 1980s is to be renovated at a cost of €4 million.

== Rail operations ==
Echterdingen station is served by lines S 2 and S 3 of the Stuttgart S-Bahn. Platform track 1 is used by services towards Rohr. Track 2 is used by S-Bahn services towards Flughafen/Messe (Airport/Fairground). The station is classified by Deutsche Bahn as a category 4 station.

== S-Bahn ==
Line	Route
S 2	Schorndorf – Weinstadt – Waiblingen – Bad Cannstatt – Hauptbahnhof – Schwabstraße – Vaihingen – Rohr – Echterdingen – Flughafen/Messe – Filderstadt (extra trains in the peak between Schorndorf and Vaihingen.)
S 3	Backnang – Winnenden – Waiblingen – Bad Cannstatt – Hauptbahnhof – Vaihingen – Rohr – Echterdingen – Flughafen/Messe (extra trains in the peak between Backnang and Vaihingen).
