= Stuttgart Feuersee station =

Railway station in Germany

Stuttgart Feuersee
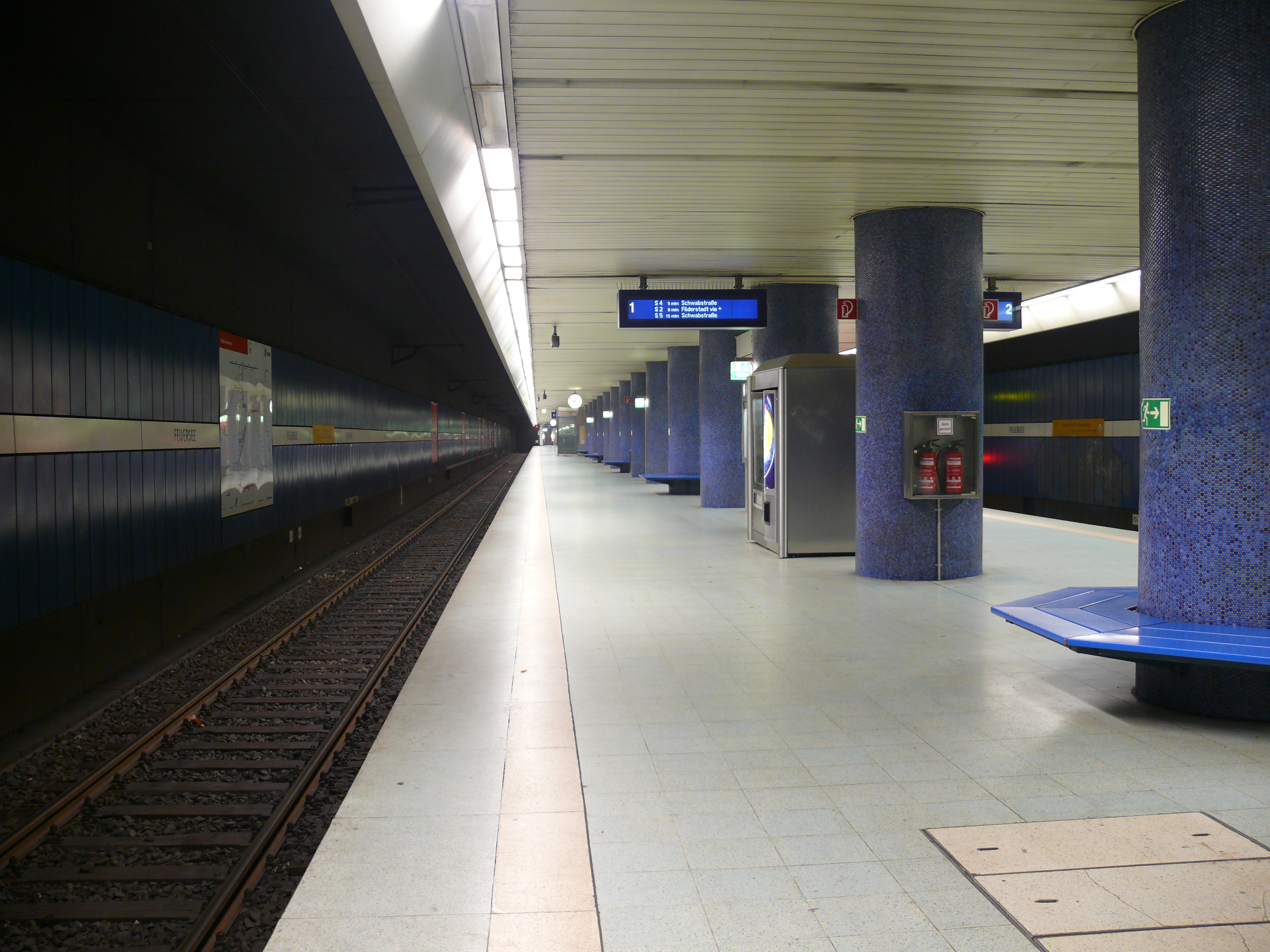
- 2009

General information
- Location: Rotebühlstraße/Silberburgstraße; 70176 Stuttgart; Baden-Württemberg; Germany
- Coordinates: 48°46′22″N 9°09′57″E
- Owner: Deutsche Bahn
- Operator: DB Netz; DB Station&Service
- Lines: Verbindungsbahn (Stuttgart) (KBS 790.x)
- Platforms: 1 island platform
- Tracks: 2
- Train operators: S-Bahn Stuttgart

Other information
- Station code: 6079
- DS100 code: TSFS
- IBNR: 8006699
- Category: 3
- Fare zone: : 1
- Website: www.bahnhof.de

History
- Opened: 1 October 1978; 47 years ago

Services
Preceding station	Stuttgart S-Bahn	Following station
Schwabstraße towards Herrenberg	S1	Stadtmitte towards Kirchheim (Teck)
Schwabstraße towards Filderstadt	S2	Stadtmitte towards Schorndorf
Schwabstraße towards Flughafen/Messe	S3	Stadtmitte towards Backnang
Schwabstraße Terminus	S4	Stadtmitte towards Backnang
Schwabstraße Terminus	S5	Stadtmitte towards Bietigheim-Bissingen
Schwabstraße Terminus	S6	Stadtmitte towards Weil der Stadt
Schwabstraße Terminus	S60	Stadtmitte towards Böblingen
Location

Stuttgart Feuersee station is a railway station in the capital city of Stuttgart, located in Baden-Württemberg, Germany.
