= Sputnik Engineering =

Sputnik Engineering AG
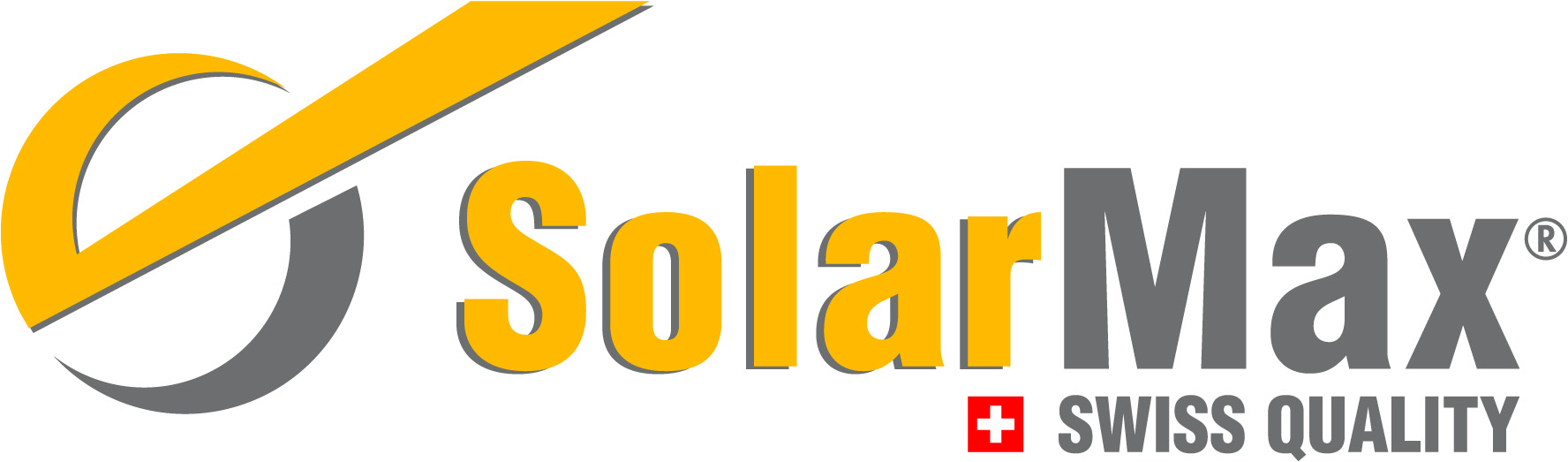
- Company type: Joint Stock Company
- Industry: Power electronics
- Founded: 1991
- Defunct: 2014
- Headquarters: Biel/Bienne, Switzerland
- Key people: Christoph von Bergen
- Products: Solar inverter and accessories
- Number of employees: 360 (01/2012)
- Website: www.solarmax.com

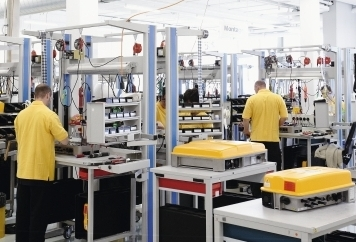
Inverter production at Sputnik Engineering

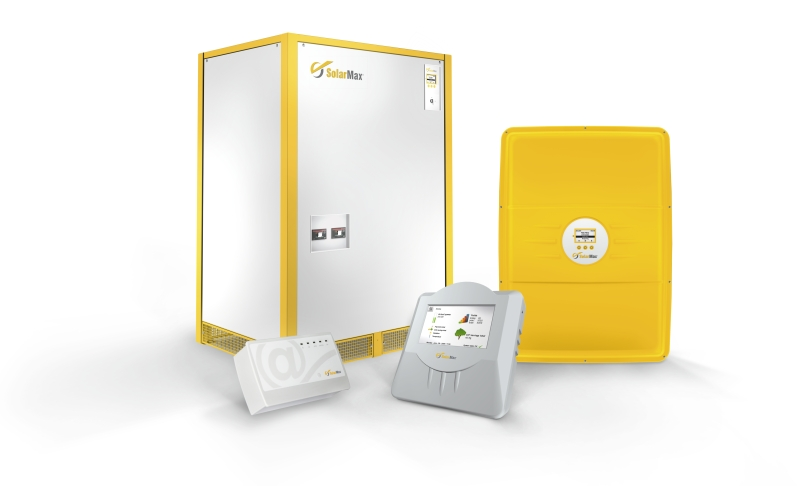
SolarMax products by Sputnik Engineering

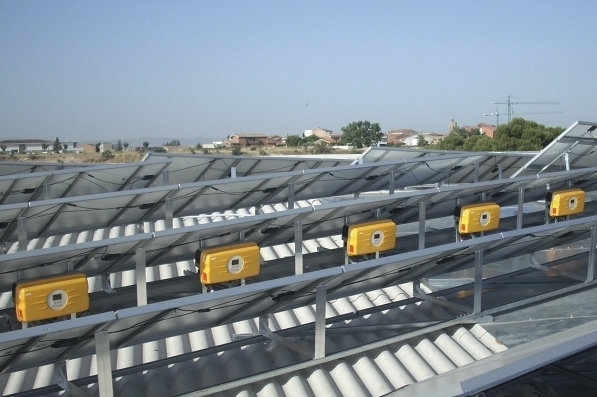
Solar power plant with SolarMax inverters

Sputnik Engineering AG was a Swiss company specializing in the development, production, distribution, and maintenance of grid-connected photovoltaic inverters. The headquarters of the company are located in Switzerland (Biel/Bienne). Sputnik Engineering has subsidiaries in Germany, Spain, Italy, France, Belgium, United Kingdom, Bulgaria, Greece and China. The bankruptcy estate was bought up by the German photovoltaic group RenerVest and the SolarMax brand was rebuilt in Germany.

== Company profile ==
Sputnik Engineering AG had been working in the field of solar energy since 1991 and is one of the pioneers for the industry that invented, among others, the first transformer-less inverter in 1994. The Company was founded in the Swiss city of Biel and concentrated on the development, production, and distribution of inverters for grid-connected PV systems. With its brand “SolarMax“, Sputnik Engineering was able to offer a suitable device for all applications: one-family houses, farms, and even solar plants producing several megawatts.

== Company structure ==
Sputnik Engineering AG, Biel/Bienne, Switzerland

- Sputnik Engineering France S.A.R.L., Saint-Priest, France
- Sputnik Engineering GmbH, Neuhausen auf den Fildern, Germany.
- Sputnik Engineering Ibérica S.L.U., Madrid, Spain
- Sputnik Engineering International AG, Biel/Bienne, Switzerland
  - Branch office Benelux, Brussels
  - Branch office Greece, Athens
  - Branch office Bulgaria, Sofia
  - Branch office United Kingdom, London
- Sputnik Engineering Italia S.r.l., Giussano, Italy
- Sputnik Engineering Trading Ltd., Shanghai, China

== Products ==
Sputnik Engineering produced string inverters and central inverters for all sizes of solar systems, from small systems for roofs to solar plants producing several megawatts. For small systems they offered string inverters from the S and P series of SolarMax with a nominal capacity from 2 to 5 kW and for medium-sized systems the MT series of SolarMax (8 to 15 kW). The central inverters Sputnik Engineering offered included the S series of SolarMax (20 to 35 kW), the TS series of SolarMax ( 50 to 300 kW), the TS-SV series of SolarMax (330 kW) and the power station (330 kW to 1.32 MW). Sputnik Engineering also developed accessories and solutions for data communication for the monitoring, planning, and control of photovoltaic systems.

== History ==
Sputnik Engineering AG was founded in 1991 as a spin-off to the engineering school in Biel, Switzerland, and introduced the first three-phase central inverter with fully digital controls and regulation to the market. The next technical innovation was the development of the first transformer-less inverter. In 2001, the subsidiary Sputnik Engineering GmbH was founded in Germany as a reaction to the considerable growth in demand for photovoltaic inverters. In 2006 the subsidiary in Spain was founded, 2007 the Italian subsidiary followed, 2008 France and 2011 China. Locations in Belgium, United Kingdom, Greece and Bulgaria were added successively. The company filed bankruptcy in 2014.
