= Stuttgart Flughafen/Messe station =

Station on the network of the Stuttgart S-Bahn

Stuttgart Flughafen/Messe
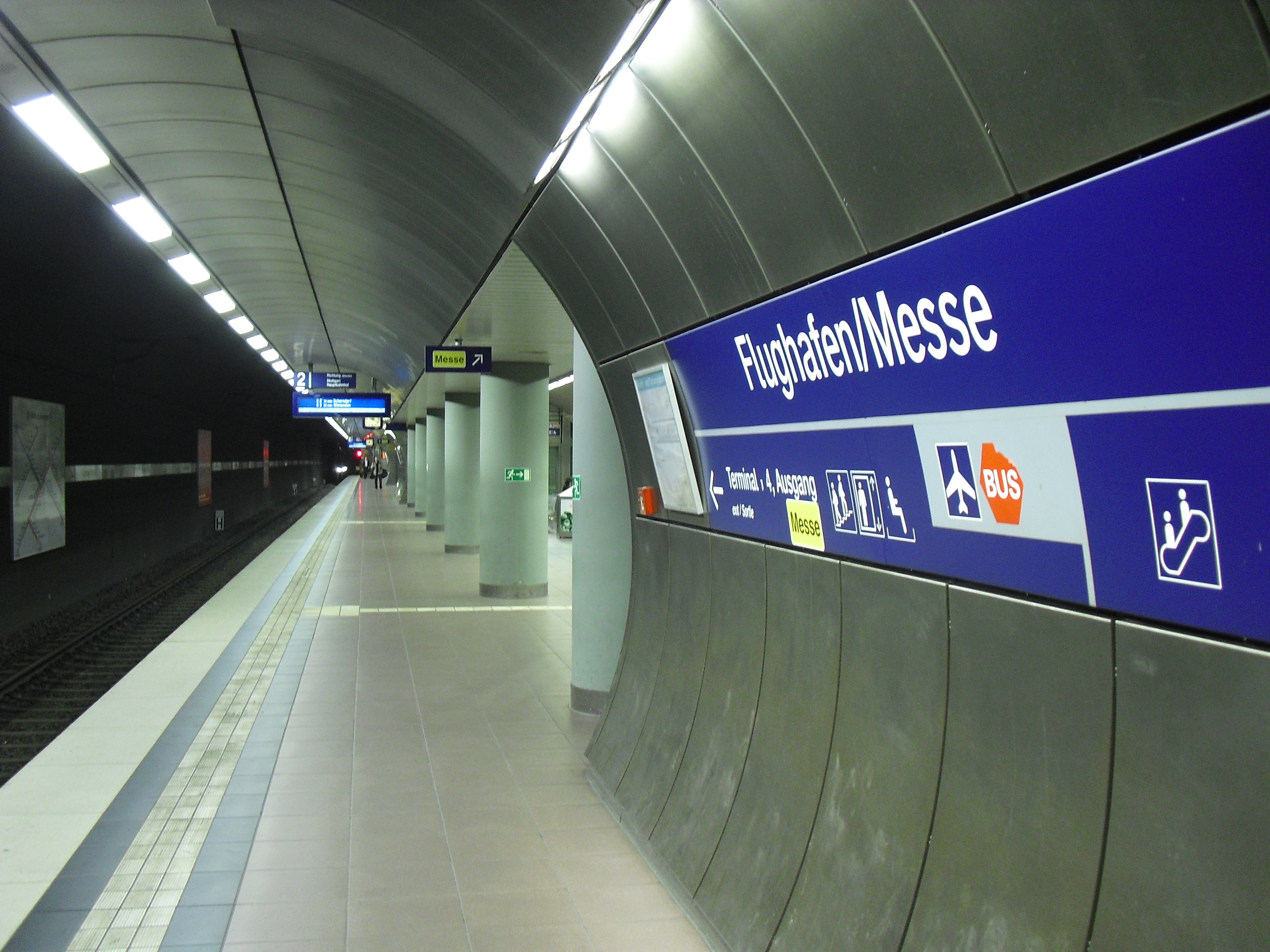

General information
- Location: Flughafenstrasse, Leinfelden-Echterdingen, BW; Germany
- Coordinates: 48°41′24″N 9°11′22″E
- Owner: Deutsche Bahn
- Operator: DB Netz; DB Station&Service
- Line: Stuttgart-Rohr–Filderstadt railway (790.2-3)
- Platforms: 1 island platform
- Tracks: 2
- Train operators: S-Bahn Stuttgart

Construction
- Accessible: Yes

Other information
- Station code: 1824
- DS100 code: TFL
- IBNR: 08005768
- Category: 4
- Fare zone: : 2; naldo: 592 (VVS transitional tariff)
- Website: www.bahnhof.de

History
- Opened: 18 April 1993

Services
Preceding station	Stuttgart S-Bahn	Following station
Filderstadt Terminus	S2	Echterdingen towards Schorndorf
Terminus	S3	Echterdingen towards Backnang
Location

Stuttgart Flughafen/Messe (German for Stuttgart Airport/Trade Fair) station is a station on the network of the Stuttgart S-Bahn. Despite its name the station is not in the city of Stuttgart, rather it is in Leinfelden-Echterdingen.

== History ==
The draft plans for the construction of an S-Bahn system in the Stuttgart area in the 1960s included consideration of a connection to the Filder plain. The line from Stuttgart-Rohr to Neuhausen auf den Fildern, on which passenger services had been closed in 1955 would be upgraded to enable S-Bahn operations to Stuttgart airport. However, the provision of better public transport links to the airport at that time was not considered a priority and had no urgency.

The doubling and electrification of the Stuttgart-Rohr–Echterdingen line only began in 1984. The connection to the airport from Echterdingen used a completely new route. The lack of space at the airport meant that only an underground station was considered. In 1986, work began on connecting the line to Terminal 1, which was built at the same time. The intense work required for the tunnel delayed the planned completion of the line and the station for several years, so the S-Bahn services on line S 2 for terminated in Oberaichen from May 1989.

On 18 April 1993 Stuttgart Flughafen station was opened. With its rich stainless steel cladding and its curves with integrated lights, the underground station is very modern and bright, and the central platform is 210 metres long. The construction of the station allowed for the extension of the underground route. In 2001, Deutsche Bahn opened a new extension to Filderstadt-Bernhausen.

In 2007, the new Stuttgart Trade Fair (Messe) opened, constituting one of several public attractions in the Filder area and was located in the catchment area of the station, which was renamed Stuttgart Flughafen/Messe station in 2008.

=== Stuttgart 21 ===
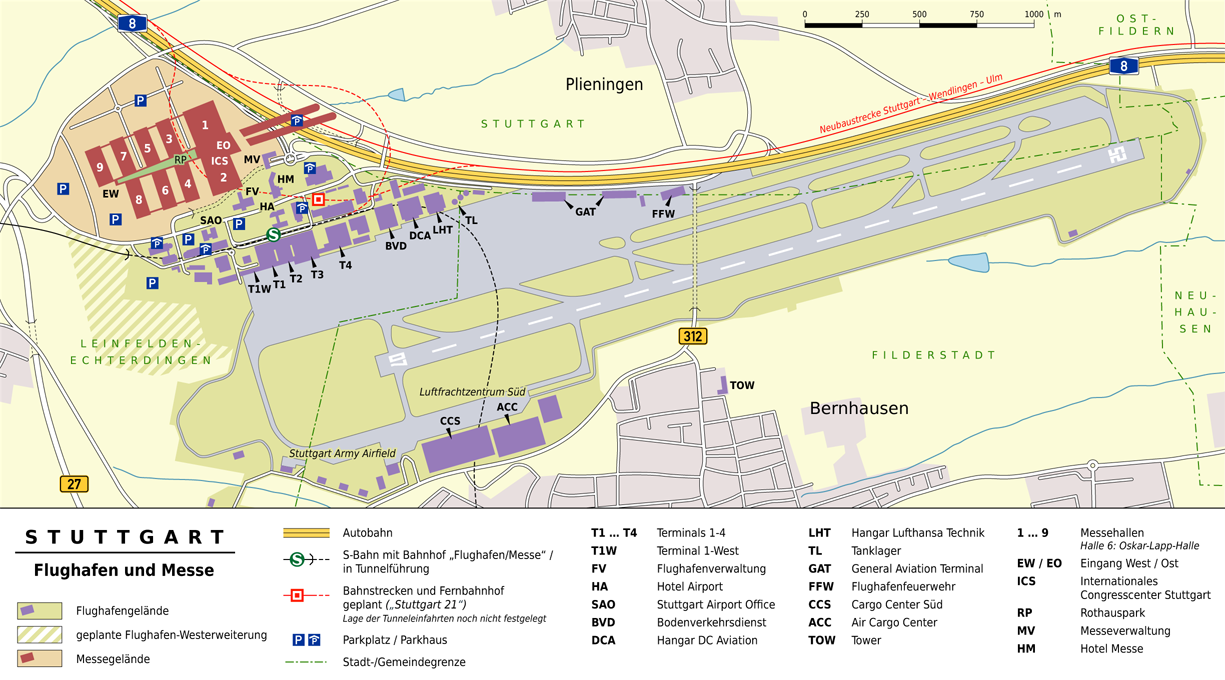
Location of the station between the Airport and the Trade Fair and the planned connection to the Stuttgart–Wendlingen high-speed railway.

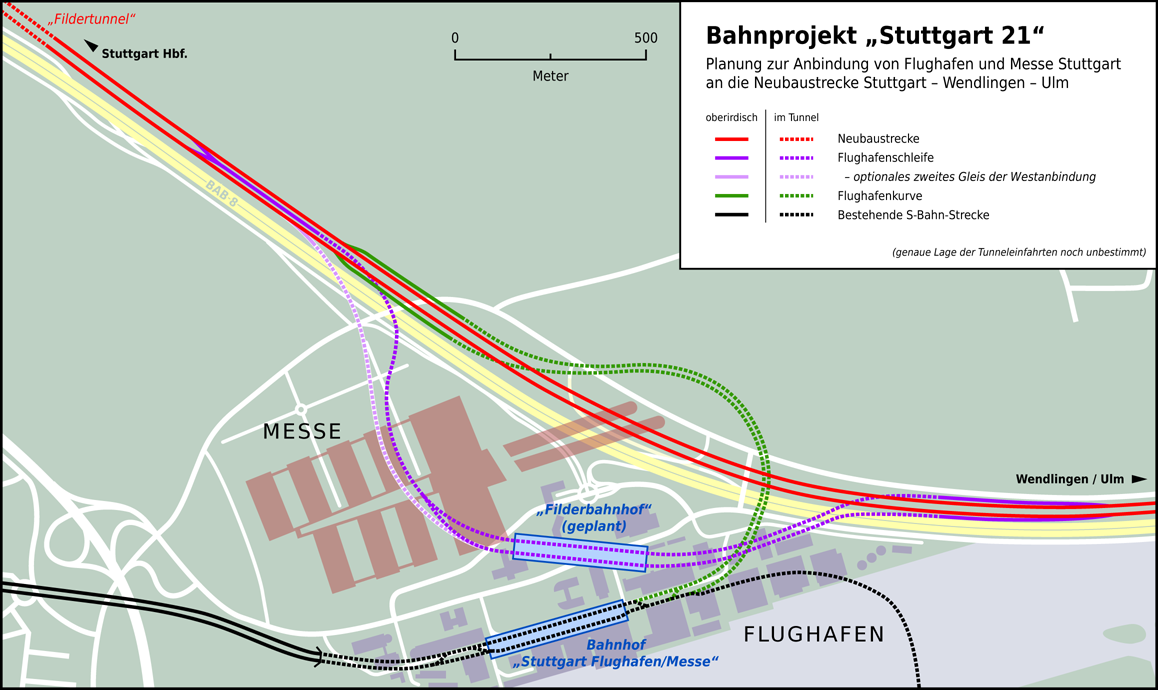
Schematic track plan in the airport area, under Stuttgart 21 project.

As part of the Stuttgart 21 project, long-distance and regional trains to and from the Stuttgart–Horb railway will run through the station in the future. This will be facilitated by the proposed Rohr Curve and a new curve connecting to the new Stuttgart–Wendlingen high-speed railway (to/from Stuttgart Hauptbahnhof). In addition, the adjacent Filder station will be built as a two-track station for long-distance services to and from the new Wendlingen–Ulm high-speed railway and regional services running to and from Tübingen via the Small Wendlingen Curve (Kleine Wendlinger Kurve).

The northern end of the platform will be used by long-distance and regional trains in the future. The entrance height of the platform will be adapted for this traffic by reducing the platform height to 76 cm by raising the track; the platform itself will remain unchanged. It is planned to extend the platform to around 300 m and two raised entrance areas will be created for S-Bahn trains.

=== Exemption ===
Use of the S-Bahn station by long-distance and regional trains appears to require an exemption in relation to platform heights as S-Bahn platforms have a height of 96 cm, while long-distance and regional trains are built for 76 cm platforms. This is the basis of the proposed raising of the track to reduce the platform height and the raised areas for access to S-Bahn trains. It is not clear if this solution is acceptable and it is possible that long-distance and regional platforms will have to be built at the nearby proposed Filder station, although this would be difficult and expensive, among other things it would have to avoid anchors for the Trade Fair exhibition halls that are up to 17 m deep. This has been estimated to cost about €80 to 100 million. An exemption is also required to operate long-distance and regional trains through the S-Bahn tunnels, which were not designed for such traffic.

=== Capacity of the station ===
There is continuing work on the adequacy of the station to handle S-Bahn, long-distance and regional traffic.

== Operations ==
The station is served by the Stuttgart S-Bahn. On track 1, S-Bahn trains run to Filderstadt. Track 2 is served by S-Bahn trains to Rohr. S-Bahn line S 3 trains mostly terminate on platform 2. There are two escalators available for travellers exiting, each leading to a mezzanine level. The western end of the mezzanine connects to Airport Terminal 1 and the exhibition grounds. Terminal 3 can be reached from the eastern end of the mezzanine.

Stuttgart Flughafen/Messe (Neckar) station is classified by Deutsche Bahn as a category 4 station.

=== S-Bahn ===
Line	Route
S 2	Schorndorf – Weinstadt – Waiblingen – Bad Cannstatt – Hauptbahnhof – Schwabstraße – Vaihingen – Rohr – Flughafen/Messe – Filderstadt
S 3	Backnang – Winnenden – Waiblingen – Bad Cannstatt – Hauptbahnhof – Schwabstraße - Vaihingen – Rohr – Flughafen/Messe
