= Stuttgart-Rohr station =

Railway station in Stuttgart, Germany

Stuttgart Rohr
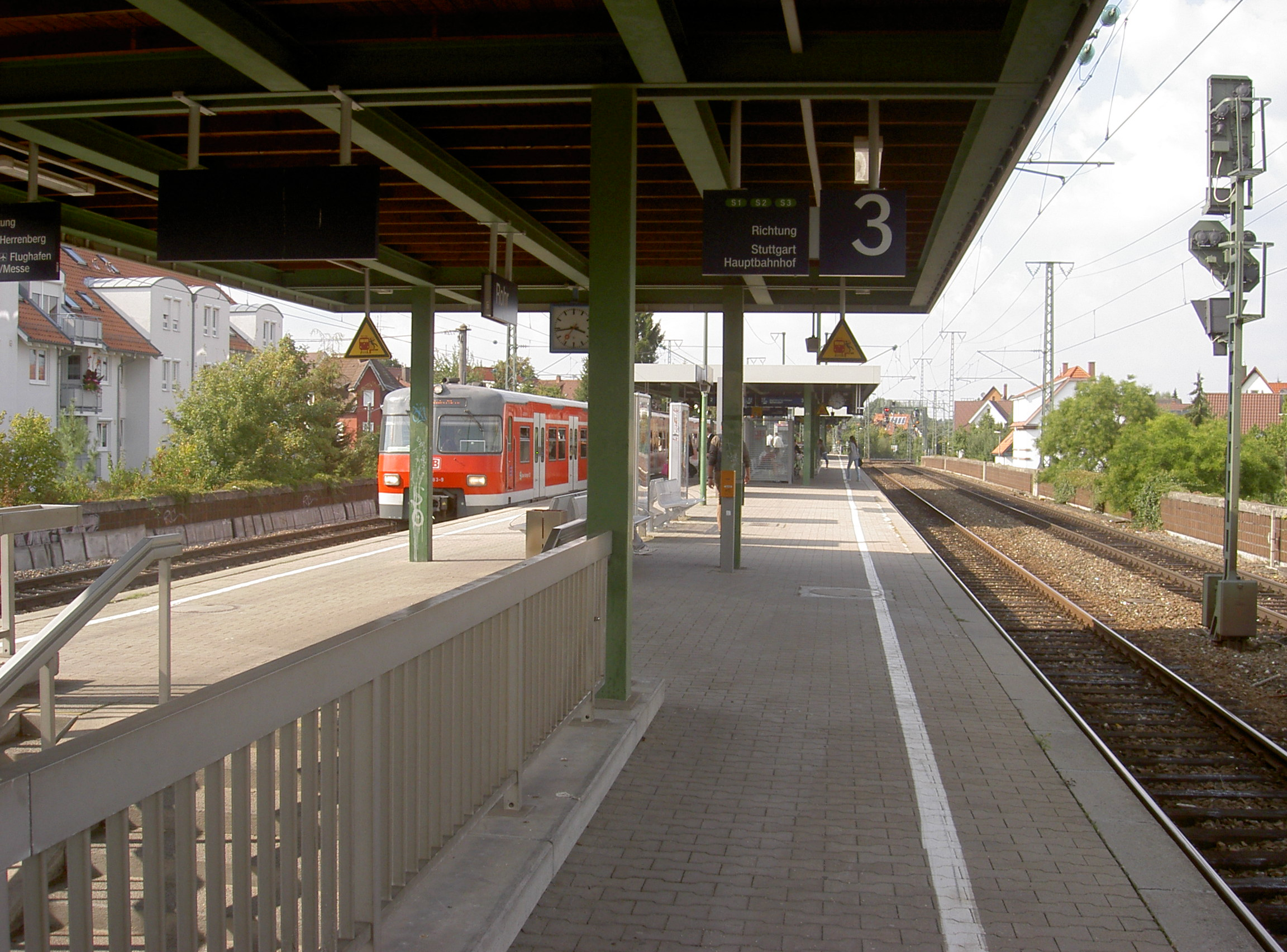

General information
- Location: Egelhaafstraße 22, Stuttgart, BW; Germany
- Coordinates: 48°43′3″N 9°6′30″E
- Owner: DB Netz
- Operator: DB Station&Service
- Lines: Stuttgart–Horb railway (740, 790.1); Stuttgart-Rohr–Filderstadt railway (790.2-3)
- Platforms: 1 island platform
- Tracks: 4
- Train operators: S-Bahn Stuttgart

Construction
- Accessible: Yes

Other information
- Station code: 6082
- DS100 code: TSRO
- IBNR: 08005773
- Category: 4
- Fare zone: : 1 and 2
- Website: www.bahnhof.de

History
- Opened: 1906

Services
Preceding station	Stuttgart S-Bahn	Following station
Goldberg towards Herrenberg	S1	Vaihingen towards Kirchheim (Teck)
Oberaichen towards Filderstadt	S2	Vaihingen towards Schorndorf
Oberaichen towards Flughafen/Messe	S3	Vaihingen towards Backnang
Location

Rohr station is located the chainage of 16.7 km (from Stuttgart Hauptbahnhof via the old route) on the Stuttgart–Horb railway (German: Gäubahn) and is a station in the network of the Stuttgart S-Bahn.

== History ==
When the Royal Württemberg State Railways opened the Gäu Railway from Stuttgart to Freudenstadt in September 1879, many residents of Rohr saw only the drawbacks of the new system of transport. Some farmers had been dispossessed for the line and believed the railway would bring only noise and odours. But when industrialisation began in the neighbouring village of Vaihingen and commuters from Rohr took advantage of its station, people learned of rail's advantages.

In 1906, Rohr station opened for passenger services. The station building was a one-story brick building with a waiting-room and station services on the former platform 1, which served the line towards Böblingen.

The line to Echterdingen has branched off 600 metres south of the station since October 1920. In 1935 the station was renamed Rohr (b Stuttgart). A year later, on 1 October 1936 the community of Rohr was incorporation in the Vaihingen auf den Fildern. This led to a second name change to Vaihingen-Rohr. In 1942, Vaihingen was incorporated into Stuttgart and the name was changed to Stuttgart-Rohr.

From 1982, Deutsche Bundesbahn began to upgrade the Gäu Railway to four tracks between the junction with the Verbindungsbahn (the underground section of the Stuttgart S-Bahn) and the branch to Echterdingen. This expansion was completed in 1984, leading to the demolition of the station building. The two outer platforms were replaced by a central platform.

== Operations ==
The station has an island platform, which has a passage down to Osterbronnstraße and is connected by an underpass to Egelhaafstraße. It is served by lines S 1, S 2 and S 3 of the Stuttgart S-Bahn.

Platform track 2 is served by S-Bahn trains towards Böblingen or Stuttgart Flughafen/Messe and track 3 is used by S-Bahn services to Stuttgart Hauptbahnhof. Tracks 1 and 4 are used by non-stopping trains and have no platforms.

Rohr station is classified by Deutsche Bahn as a category 4 station.

=== S-Bahn ===
Line	Route
S 1	Kirchheim (Teck) – Wendlingen – Plochingen – Esslingen – Neckarpark – Bad Cannstatt – Hauptbahnhof – Schwabstraße – Vaihingen – Rohr – Böblingen – Herrenberg (extra trains in the peak between Esslingen and Böblingen.)
S 2	Schorndorf – Weinstadt – Waiblingen – Bad Cannstatt – Hauptbahnhof – Schwabstraße – Vaihingen – Rohr – Stuttgart Flughafen/Messe – Filderstadt (extra trains in the peak between Schorndorf and Vaihingen.)
S 3	Backnang – Winnenden – Waiblingen – Bad Cannstatt – Hauptbahnhof – Vaihingen – Rohr – Flughafen/Messe (extra trains in the peak between Backnang and Vaihingen).
