= Filderstadt station =

Railway station in Germany

Filderstadt
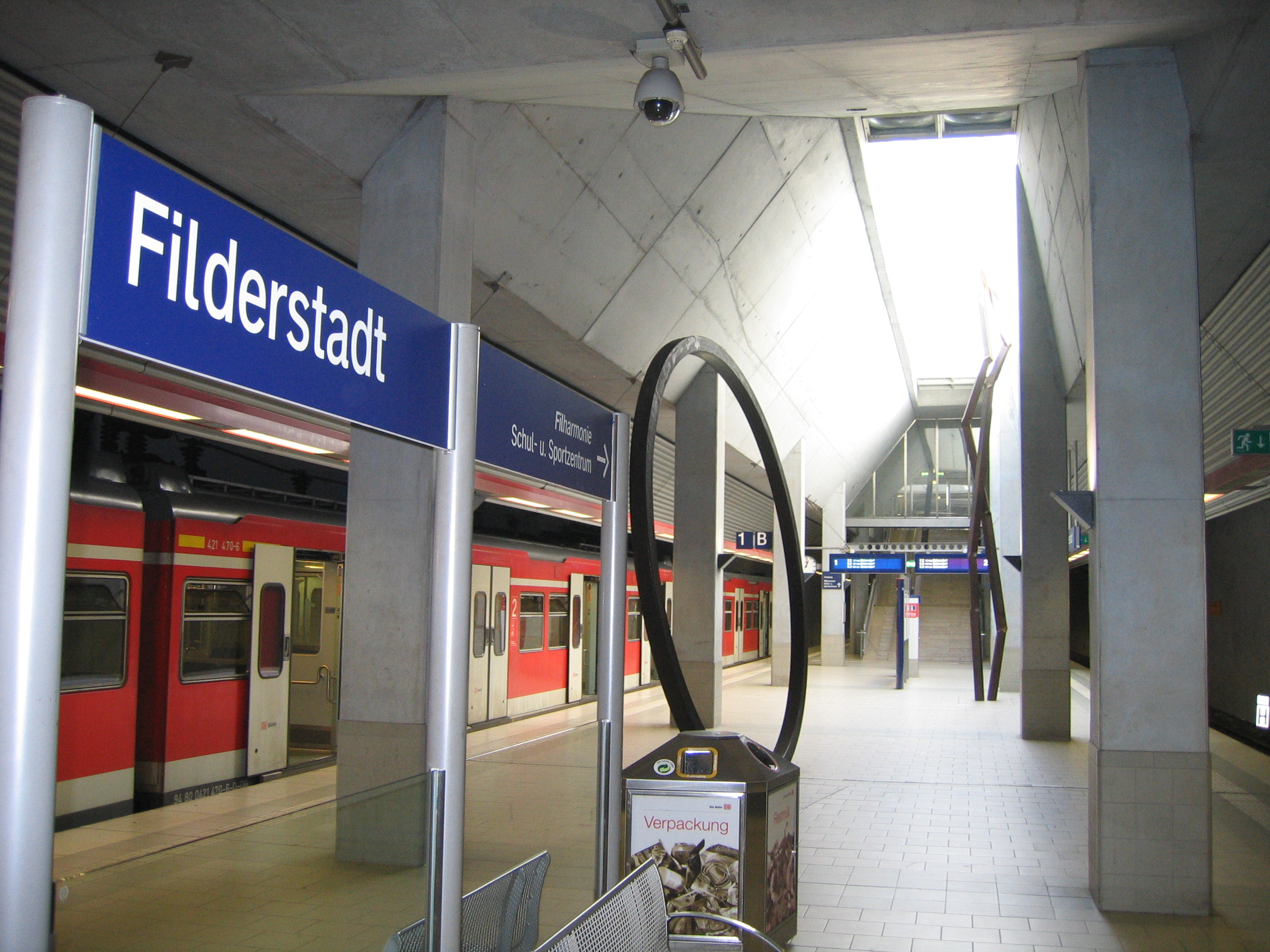

General information
- Location: Filderbahnstrasse, Filderstadt, Baden-Württemberg; Germany
- Coordinates: 48°40′35″N 9°13′6″E
- Owner: Deutsche Bahn
- Operator: DB Netz; DB Station&Service
- Line: Stuttgart-Rohr–Filderstadt railway (790.2-3)
- Platforms: 1 island platform
- Tracks: 2
- Train operators: S-Bahn Stuttgart
- Connections: S 2

Construction
- Accessible: Yes

Other information
- Station code: 3022
- DS100 code: TFIL
- IBNR: 8001984
- Category: 4
- Fare zone: : 2; naldo: 511 (VVS transitional tariff)
- Website: www.bahnhof.de

History
- Opened: 23 December 1897; 29 September 2001 (reopened)
- Closed: 1 August 1955 (passengers); 28 May 1983 (freight)

Services
Preceding station	Stuttgart S-Bahn	Following station
Terminus	S2	Flughafen/Messe towards Schorndorf
Location

Filderstadt station (called Bernhausen station until 28 May 1983) is the end point of the railway from Stuttgart-Rohr. Line S 2 of the Stuttgart S-Bahn terminates here.

== History ==
In 1891 the Filder Railway Company (German: Filderbahn-Gesellschaft) planned a new railway from Möhringen to Echterdingen. At the same time a local railway (Lokalbahn) committee was established, with participants from Neuhausen, Bernhausen, Obersielmingen, Untersielmingen and Denkendorf, which supported an extension from Echterdingen to Zell am Neckar. It persisted but without success. Instead, the State government approved the establishment of the metre gauge Möhringen-Neuhausen line on 14 April 1896. It was formally inaugurated on 23 December 1897 and regular operations began on the following day.

Bernhausen station was built south of the village. The station building, which still stands, is a Württemberg station of type IIIa, slightly adapted by the Filder Railway. The building housed waiting rooms, station services and residential rooms. The freight shed does not exist anymore. This loaded the produce of the Briem cabbages factory and the mainly white cabbages of local farmers. The line was regauged to standard gauge on 1 November 1902. In 1903 a Sunday service commenced when the Swabian Albverein (hiking club) opened a new observation tower on the Uhlberg, south of Plattenhardt.

In 1914 a bus line was opened from Degerloch via Bernhausen to Nürtingen. It competed for a short time with the Filder Railway, but it was closed at the outbreak of World War I.

On 1 October 1920 the Deutsche Reichsbahn opened a new line from Rohr to Echterdingen to connect with the Echterdingen–Neuhausen section of the Municipal Filder Railway (Städtischen Filderbahn, SFB). This section remained the property of the SFB (which was owned by the City of Stuttgart) and was absorbed into the Stuttgart Tramways (Stuttgarter Straßenbahnen, SSB) on 1 January 1934. The bus route from Degerloch to Nürtingen was reinstated in 1927.

In 1937, construction began on the Stuttgart-Echterdingen airport. To make room for it, the line between Echterdingen and Bernhausen had to be relocated and it subsequently ran south of the airport.

After the Second World War the SSB increased services on its bus line N (Degerloch-Nürtingen). The communities of Bernhausen and Sielmingen called for the extension of the Möhringen–Echterdingen tram line. This, however, was refused by the Government Stuttgart in 1952. The number of passengers on the Stuttgart-Rohr–Neuhausen line continued to fall. Therefore, Deutsche Bundesbahn closed the line to passengers on 1 August 1955. The SSB continued to operate freight services on the Leinfelden–Neuhausen section.

On 1 January 1975 the communities of Bernhausen, Bonlanden, Plattenhardt, Sielmingen and Harthausen were amalgamated as Filderlinden, which was renamed as Filderstadt on 25 July 1975.

In the 1980s, Deutsche Bundesbahn proposed to connect the airport to a planned S-Bahn network. For this purpose, the Stuttgart-Rohr–Echterdingen line was required and its track would need to be doubled and electrified. A rail service between Leinfelden and Neuhausen was therefore not possible. On 28 May 1983, the last freight train operated to Bernhausen station. Shortly thereafter the dismantling of the tracks began. Also at first there appeared to be no further use for the station building. But the history and folk society of Filderstadt (Geschichts- und Heimatverein Filderstadt) successfully fought for its preservation.

The extension of the so-called airport S-Bahn was originally planned by Deutsche Bundesbahn in the 1980s. It was finally implemented on 13 February 1998. On this day construction began on the line between the underground Airport Station and Bernhausen. On 29 September 2001, Deutsche Bahn opened a new tunnel to the new underground Filderstadt station. The adjacent bus stop is still called Bernhausen Bahnhof (“Bernhausen station”).

== Station design ==
The old line in Filderstadt was not reopened. The underground station is mostly built under the old railway property and is designed to allow a possible further extension to Neuhausen.

There are western and eastern accesses for passengers to the 210-metre long central platform. The western access is like a park, having a gently sloping lawn with a water staircase and a sculpture called Filderspiel (“Filder game”). There is also set of sculptures on the platform.

In 2001 the city of Filderstadt renovated the historic station building. It houses a Tourist Information Office and a local government shopfront (Bürgeramt). It is centrally located on the square between the streets of Karlstraße and Filderbahnstraße.

== Operations ==
The station is served by the Stuttgart S-Bahn. S-Bahn line S 2 begins and ends here. Tracks 1 and 2 are used alternately as the departure and arrival track.

Filderstadt station is classified by Deutsche Bahn as a category 5 station.

=== S-Bahn ===
Line	Route
S 2	Schorndorf – Weinstadt – Waiblingen – Bad Cannstatt – Hauptbahnhof – Schwabstraße – Vaihingen – Rohr – Stuttgart Flughafen/Messe – Filderstadt
