= Stuttgart Schwabstraße station =

Railway station in Germany

Stuttgart Schwabstraße
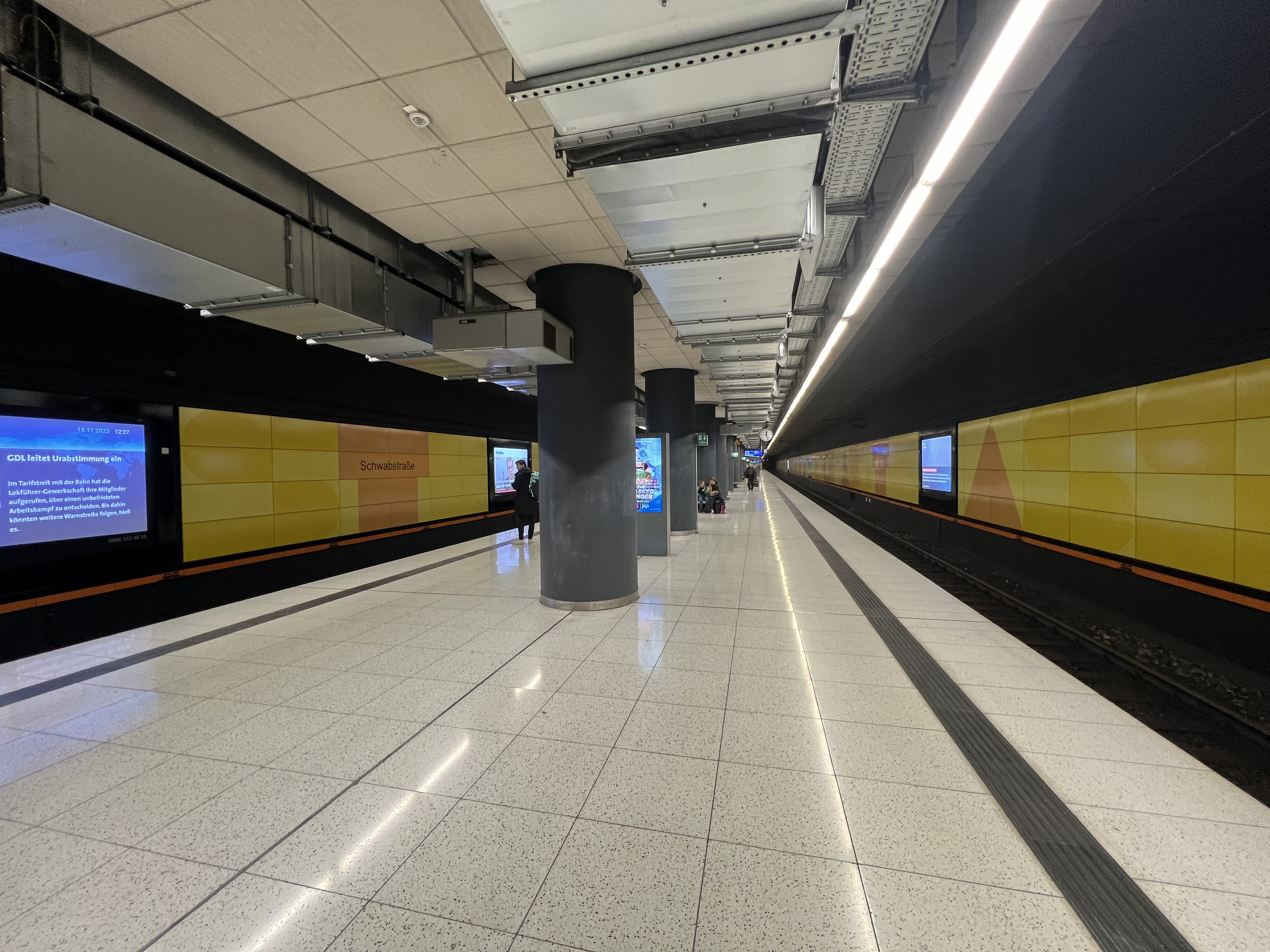
- View of platforms

General information
- Location: Rotebühlstrasse, Stuttgart, BW; Germany
- Coordinates: 48°46′13″N 9°09′24″E
- Owner: Deutsche Bahn
- Operator: DB Netz; DB Station&Service
- Lines: Verbindungsbahn (Stuttgart) (KBS 790.x)
- Platforms: 1 island platform
- Tracks: 2
- Train operators: S-Bahn Stuttgart

Construction
- Accessible: Yes

Other information
- Station code: 6083
- DS100 code: TSS
- IBNR: 8006698
- Category: 3
- Fare zone: : 1
- Website: www.bahnhof.de

History
- Opened: 1 October 1978

Services
| Preceding station | Stuttgart S-Bahn | Following station |
|---|---|---|
| University towards Herrenberg | S1 | Feuersee towards Kirchheim (Teck) |
| University towards Filderstadt | S2 | Feuersee towards Schorndorf |
| University towards Flughafen/Messe | S3 | Feuersee towards Backnang |
| Terminus | S4 | Feuersee towards Backnang |
| Terminus | S5 | Feuersee towards Bietigheim-Bissingen |
| Terminus | S6 | Feuersee towards Weil der Stadt |
| Terminus | S60 | Feuersee towards Böblingen |
Location

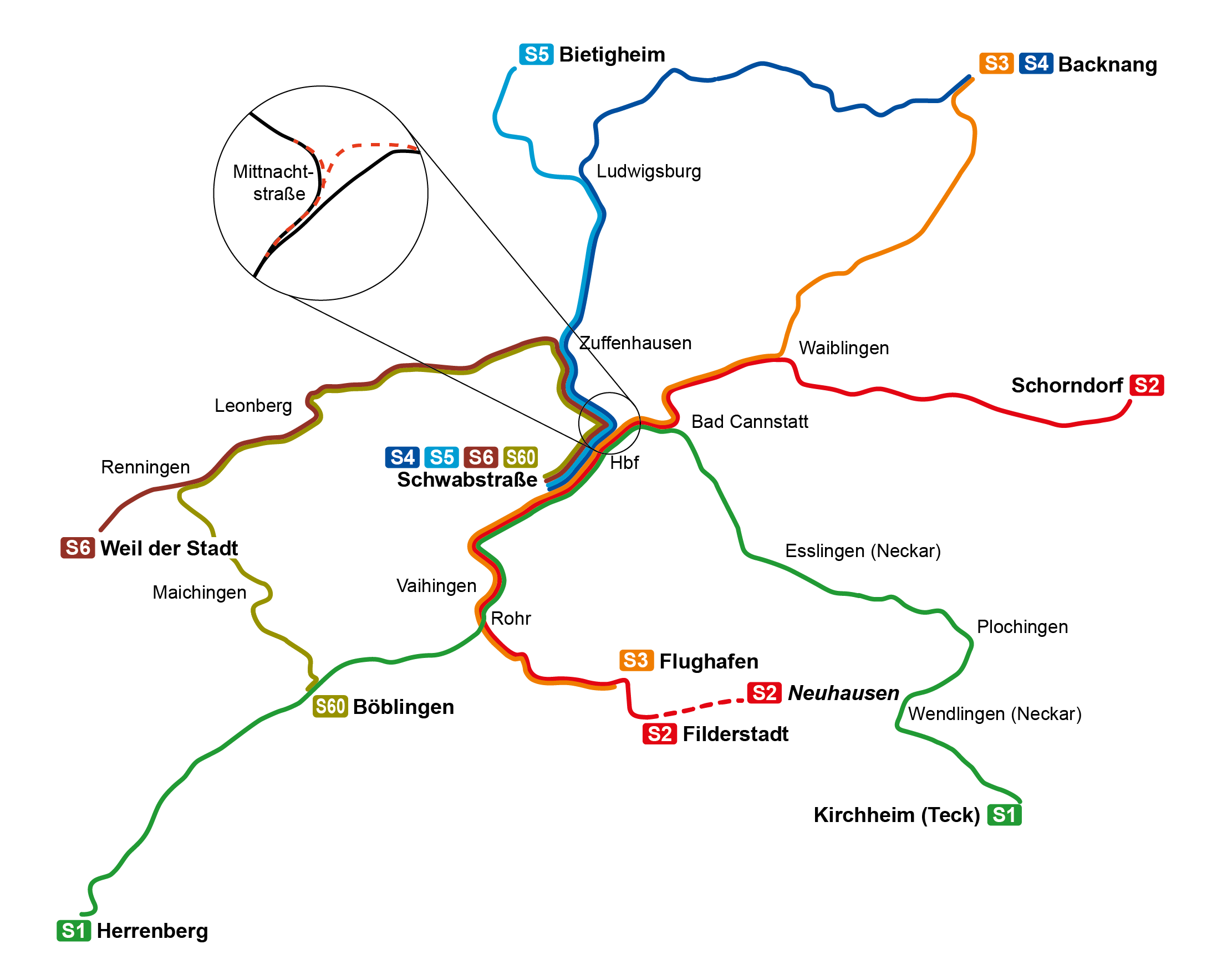
Stuttgart S-Bahn network with Schwabstraße station in the middle

Schwabstraße station is a subterranean railway station in Stuttgart, Germany. It is located west of the city centre in the district of Stuttgart-West, along Rotebühlstraße at the intersection with Schwabstraße. The station originally formed the terminus of the first section of the Connection line (German: Verbindungsbahn), the original underground section of the Stuttgart S-Bahn. Several lines of the S-Bahn terminate at the station. It is notable for a 1.5 km long loop at the end of the station to allow S-Bahn trains to turn around.

== History ==
Schwabstraße station was built in the course of the construction of the Stuttgart S-Bahn in the mid-1970s. The station was built using excavation from the surface and mining techniques for the terminal loop. Its construction proved to be very difficult. The shell was completed in December 1977 and in 1978 the first section of the Connection line began operating to Schwabstraße. In 1985, the line was extended to the southwest to Stuttgart University station at the University of Stuttgart.

== Station ==
The station is between 11 and 27 m below the street surface, lying 6 to 8 metres below the water table. It has a gradient of 1.6 per thousand. The station has an island platform with two platform edges. Platform track 1 serves trains towards University station and trains terminating at Schwabstraße. Track 2 serves trains running towards Stuttgart Central station. Accesses to the platforms are at either end of the platform. At the western end of the platform the tracks to the turning loop separate from the through tracks towards Universität.

== Terminal loop ==
The station has an unusual operational feature, a turning loop. It runs completely underground and contains a siding for a full train. The depth of the ground covering the tunnel ranges from 17 m near the platforms to 80 m at its western end near the former Stuttgart West station. Given the number of trains using the line, a return loop was found to have a higher economic return than simple terminating tracks despite the higher construction costs.

Excavation of the loop began on 7 October 1974 and the construction of the junction structures and the first 60 m sections of the two single-track tunnel tubes of the Hasenberg Tunnels towards the Stuttgart–Horb railway. The actual connection to the Stuttgart–Horb railway was built in 1979 and went into operation in 1985.

The front of the terminal loop is in leached Gipskeuper rock. Because this is fragile and the depth of rock is low, the rock above the tunnel roof was made stable by freezing it. There was a geological problem as the back of the terminal loop was situated in Gipskeuper layers containing anhydrite, which swell strongly when in contact with water, which is inevitable in a tunnel, and create strong forces on the sides of the tunnel. Accordingly, the inner shell of the tunnel is up to 1 m thick.

The tunnel section has an inner diameter of 6.70 m on single-track sections and 9.80 m on two-track sections. The radius of the loop is 190 m and its length is 1,500 m.

== Operations ==
The station's abbreviation is TSS. The station is in the fare zone of the Verkehrs- und Tarifverbund Stuttgart (transport and tariff association of Stuttgart). The station is classified by Deutsche Bahn as a category 3 station.

=== S-Bahn ===
| Line | Route |
|---|---|
| S 1 | Kirchheim (Teck) – Wendlingen – Plochingen – Esslingen – Neckarpark – Bad Cannstatt – Hauptbahnhof – Schwabstraße – Vaihingen – Rohr – Böblingen – Herrenberg |
| S 2 | Schorndorf – Weinstadt – Waiblingen – Bad Cannstatt – Hauptbahnhof – Schwabstraße – Vaihingen – Rohr – Stuttgart Flughafen/Messe – Filderstadt |
| S 3 | Backnang – Winnenden – Waiblingen – Bad Cannstatt – Hauptbahnhof – Schwabstraße – Vaihingen – Rohr – Flughafen/Messe |
| S 4 | Schwabstraße – Hauptbahnhof – Zuffenhausen – Ludwigsburg – Marbach – Kirchberg (Murr) – Burgstall (Murr) – Backnang |
| S 5 | Schwabstraße – Hauptbahnhof – Zuffenhausen – Ludwigsburg – Bietigheim |
| S 6 | Schwabstraße – Hauptbahnhof – Zuffenhausen – Leonberg – Weil der Stadt |
| S 60 | Schwabstraße – Hauptbahnhof – Zuffenhausen – Leonberg – Renningen – Magstadt – Maichingen – Sindelfingen – Böblingen |
