= Stuttgart-Vaihingen station =

Railway station in Vaihingen, Germany

Stuttgart Vaihingen
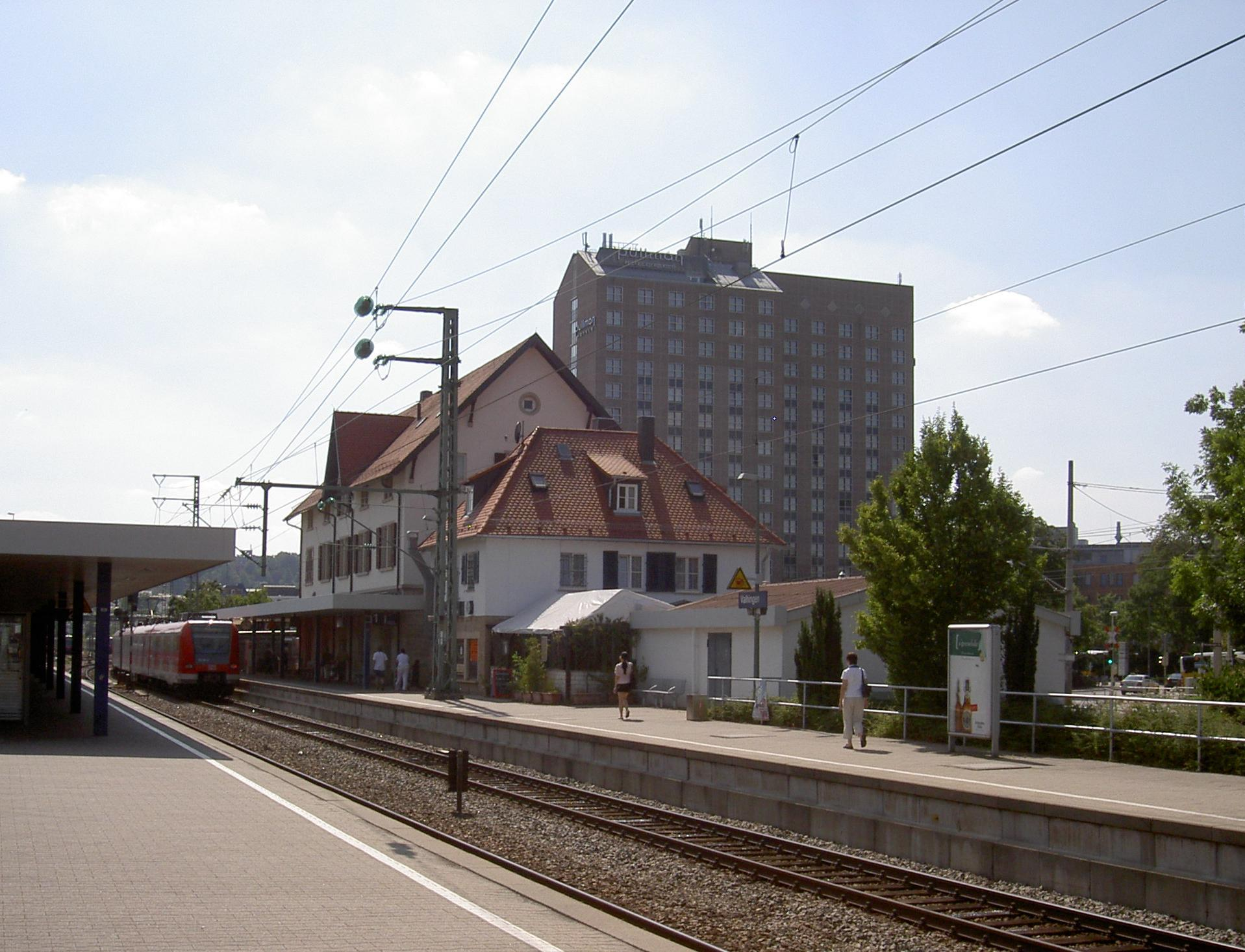

General information
- Location: Stuttgart-Vaihingen, BW; Germany
- Coordinates: 48°43′36″N 9°6′47″E
- Owner: DB Netz
- Operator: DB Station&Service
- Lines: Stuttgart–Horb (KBS 740, KBS 790.1, KBS 790.2-3); formerly: Vaihingen–Möhringen
- Platforms: 1 island platform 1 side platform
- Tracks: 7
- Train operators: S-Bahn Stuttgart
- Connections: 80, 81, 82, 84, 86

Construction
- Accessible: Yes

Other information
- Station code: 6087
- DS100 code: TSV
- IBNR: 8005776
- Category: 3
- Fare zone: : 1
- Website: www.bahnhof.de

History
- Opened: 2 September 1879

Services
Preceding station	DB Fernverkehr	Following station
Stuttgart Hbf Terminus	IC 87	Böblingen towards Schaffhausen
Preceding station	Stuttgart S-Bahn	Following station
Rohr towards Herrenberg	S1	Österfeld towards Kirchheim (Teck)
Rohr towards Filderstadt	S2	Österfeld towards Schorndorf
Rohr towards Flughafen/Messe	S3	Österfeld towards Backnang
Location

Vaihingen station is located on the Stuttgart–Horb railway in the German state of Baden-Württemberg. It is served by regional services and Stuttgart S-Bahn lines S1, S2 and S3. It is also a hub for public transport to the Filder plain.

== History ==
The Royal Württemberg State Railways opened the Stuttgart–Horb railway of part of the Gäu Railway from Stuttgart to Freudenstadt together with Vaihingen auf den Fildern station on 2 September 1879. This was then about 400 metres southeast of Vaihingen village and consisted of the existing entrance building and a freight terminal building.

In 1891, the Filder Railway Company (Filderbahn-Gesellschaft) decided to establish a line from Möhringen to Vaihingen station, which was approved by the government on 14 April 1896. The first train ran to Vaihingen on 23 December 1897. The metre gauge tracks were to the east of the State Railways' standard gauge tracks. In 1898 a Rollbock facility was built at the station to enable standard gauge freight wagons to be transferred from Vaihingen on the Filder Railway to run to Degerloch, Hohenheim and Neuhausen. In 1902, the Filder Railway replaced the metre gauge tracks with dual gauge tracks for freight. The Degerloch–Vaihingen section was electrified in 1904 and a connection was built from the Wallgraben to Schillerplatz (Vaihingen Ort station, in Vaihingen village) with the transfer of the line to the State Railways.

On 22 November 1905, a second track was completed on the line between Stuttgart West station and Böblingen. Additional tracks were built at the station during the next two years. To avoid confusion with Vaihingen (Enz) station on the Western Railway (called Vaihingen-Sersheim until 1906), Vaihingen station was changed to Vaihingen (Filderstadt) station.

The Württembergische Nebenbahnen AG ("Württemberg Local Railway Company", the successor to the Filder Railway Company) closed the connection to Vaihingen Ort station on 15 April 1915 so that its copper wire could be used for military purposes during World War I. The line was reopened on 28 October 1929 as the Urban Filder Railway (Städtische Filderbahn) and connected to the Stuttgart tramways.

With the incorporation of Vaihingen in the city of Stuttgart on 1 April 1942, the station's name was changed a second time to Stuttgart-Vaihingen.

On 15 May 1944, Stuttgart Tramways (Stuttgarter Straßenbahnen AG, SSB) commenced passenger services from Möhringen to Vaihingen station and trams stopped running to Vaihingen Ort. The track to Möhringen was still served by freight until it was closed in 1981. From then until 2008, the SSB used the line for the transfer of U-Bahn carriages, but it now ends at a buffer. The creation of a loop via Herrenbergerstraße and Emilienstraße resulted in the establishment of new tram stops in 1963. One of these was near the station in Vollmoellerstraße.

Deutsche Bundesbahn rebuilt the station between 1980 and 1985 as part of the extension of the S-Bahn. Freight handling was moved to the eastern side and the level crossing of Mitterwurzerstraße was closed. The platforms were raised to conform with S-Bahn standards. At the same time a storage area for S-Bahn trains was created south of the station. A four-track Stuttgart station was opened in the station forecourt.

With the commissioning of the Verbindungsbahn ("connection line") on 29 September 1985, S-Bahn operations began and regional trains no longer called at Stuttgart-Vaihingen.

== Operations ==
The station has three platform tracks and is served by Stuttgart S-Bahn lines S1, S2 and S3. Track 1 is served by S1 services to Böblingen. S-Bahn services to Stuttgart Flughafen/Messe stop on track 2. Services of all three lines to Stuttgart Hauptbahnhof stop on track 3. The station is classified by Deutsche Bahn as a category 3 station.

=== Long Distance ===
Line	Route	Frequency
IC 87	(Frankfurt – Heidelberg) – Stuttgart – Singen – Schaffhausen – (Zürich)	One train pair

=== S-Bahn ===
Line	Route
S 1	Kirchheim (Teck) – Wendlingen – Plochingen – Esslingen – Neckarpark – Bad Cannstatt – Hauptbahnhof – Schwabstraße – Vaihingen – Rohr – Böblingen – Herrenberg (extra trains in the peak between Esslingen and Böblingen.)
S 2	Schorndorf – Weinstadt – Waiblingen – Bad Cannstatt – Hauptbahnhof – Schwabstraße – Vaihingen – Rohr – Stuttgart Flughafen/Messe – Filderstadt (extra trains in the peak between Schorndorf and Vaihingen.)
S 3	Backnang – Winnenden – Waiblingen – Bad Cannstatt – Hauptbahnhof – Vaihingen – Rohr – Flughafen/Messe (extra trains in the peak between Backnang and Vaihingen.)

=== Stadtbahn ===
The following three Stadtbahn lines begin and end at the Stadtbahn station at Vaihingen station. The U1 served the station until 10 December 2023 when changes as part of "Netz 2024" (Network 2024) extended U14 services to the station, replacing the U1 service.

Line	Route
U1	Fellbach Lutherkirche – Bad Cannstatt – Stuttgart Hbf – Vaihingen; See Note
U3	Plieningen (Uni Hohenheim) – Möhringen – Vaihingen
U8	Vaihingen – Möhringen – Degerloch – Ruhbank/Fernsehturm – Heumaden – Ostfildern-Nellingen; Monday to Friday only from 5:30 to 19:30 at 20-minute intervals
U14	Mühlhausen – Münster – Charlottenplatz – Heslach Vogelrain – Vaihingen
