= Stuttgart-Rohr–Filderstadt railway =

Railway line in Germany

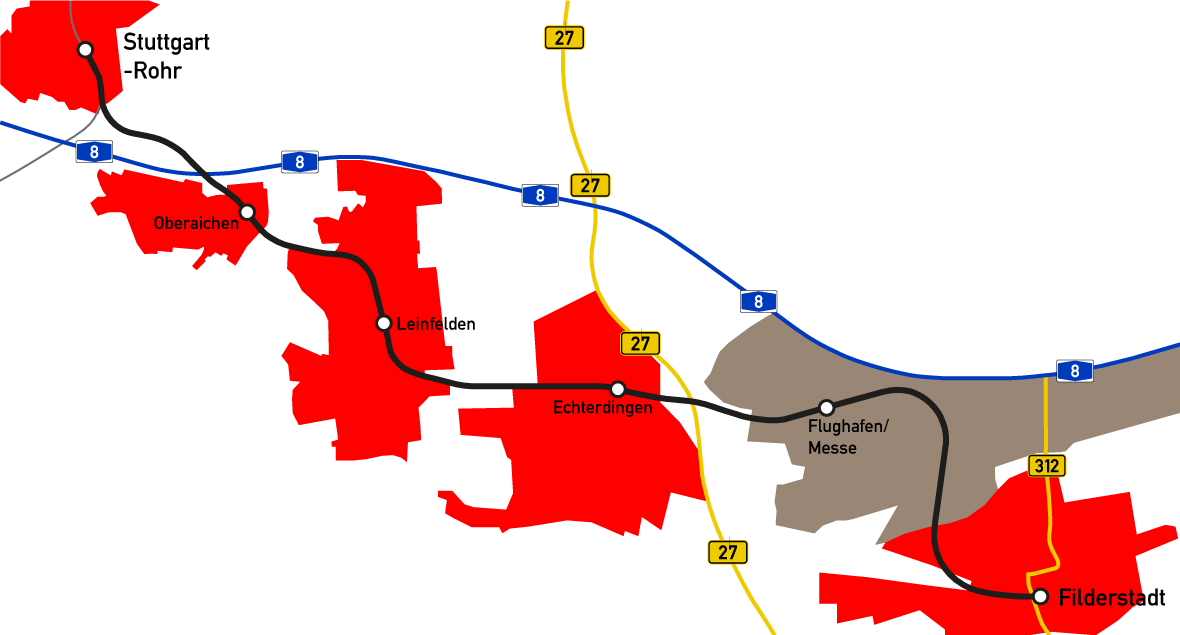

Overview
- Line number: 4861 (Stuttgart Hbf–Filderstadt); 4862 (old route, to Leinfelden)
- Locale: Baden-Württemberg, Germany

Service
- Route number: 790.2-3

Technical
- Line length: 11.0 km (6.8 mi)
- Number of tracks: 2 (Rohr–Flughafen/Messe)
- Track gauge: 1,435 mm (4 ft 8 1/2 in) standard gauge
- Electrification: 15 kV/16.7 Hz AC overhead catenary
- Operating speed: 100 km/h (62 mph)
- Maximum incline: 3.6%

The Stuttgart-Rohr–Filderstadt line is an electrified, and mostly double-track line main railway in the German state of Baden-Württemberg. It branches in the Stuttgart district of Rohr from the Stuttgart–Horb railway and runs via Oberaichen, Leinfelden, Echterdingen and Stuttgart Airport to Bernhausen, a district of Filderstadt. It is now part of the Stuttgart S-Bahn.

== History ==
The Rohr–Echterdingen section was built as an unemployment relief project in 1920 by the Deutsche Reichsbahn (DR) to connect with the Stuttgart-Möhringen–Neuhausen auf den Fildern railway, that had been built by the private Filder Railway Company (Filderbahn-Gesellschaft) to create a better link with the DR network. The line was opened on 1 October 1920, with services running through to Neuhausen. This allowed passenger trains to run through without changing in Degerloch. Services from Echterdingen to Filderstadt were operated by Stuttgart Tramways (Stuttgarter Straßenbahnen, SSB) from 1920 and the Tramways took over the ownership of the line in 1934. In 1928 a branch line was opened from Leinfelden to Waldenbuch called the Siebenmühlentalbahn (Siebenmühlen Valley Railway).

A track was laid in 1934 between Echterdingen and Bernhausen for the construction of the A8 and Stuttgart Airport. It was extended towards Denkendorf to take construction material along the autobahn as it was built and it also supplied construction materials and goods for the construction of the airport, which was completed in 1939. The route of the line was diverted to the east of Echterdingen station to Bernhausen in 1937 to run south of the airport area. The current S-Bahn route, however, largely follows the former construction siding.

In 1955, passenger services on the Stuttgart-Rohr–Echterdingen (–Neuhausen) line and on the Siebenmühlen Valley line were replaced by bus services; the line was now only used for freight traffic. The supplying of fuel and other goods to the airport by rail was abandoned by the end of the 1960s. At the same time the proposed Echterdingen link road was abandoned during the planning of the new Federal Highway 27 and the proposed use of the southern part of the military airport by the U.S. Army did not materialise due to community opposition. On 28 May 1983, freight traffic on the Leinfelden–Neuhausen section was closed and the tracks on the SSB-owned route from Echterdingen to Neuhausen were soon removed. The tracks on the Deutsche Bahn section from Leinfelden to Echterdingen were closed for rebuilding in preparation for the S-Bahn a few years later. The last train to run on the original line before the reopening for the S-Bahn was an Uerdingen railbus from Echterdingenran in September 1985 during a special trip for the inauguration of the S-Bahn to Stuttgart-Vaihingen. The remaining Rohr–Leinfelden section was still used occasionally for shunting freight until the early 1990s. It was used mainly to serve Leinfelden-based companies, but also for the transport of construction materials for the S-Bahn. The line was reconstructed for the S-Bahn from the mid-1980s, with the installation of double track, electrification and the partial undergrounding of the track. Curves were also straightened. A new line was created between Echterdingen and the airport.

The preliminary plan for the Stuttgart S-Bahn included a Filder-Schnellbahn (Filder fast railway) between Stuttgart-Vaihingen and the Airport with a calculated construction costs of DM 47 million (1966 prices). Doubling of the track, an extension to the airport and electrification from Stuttgart-Rohr was planned. The project was to be realised in two phases from 1976 to 1978.

== Current use ==
An exemption granted by Deutsche Bundesbahn in 1988 allows a particularly low contact wire height in the tunnel areas in Echterdingen and at the airport.

The Stuttgart S-Bahn ran to Oberaichen from 27 May 1989 and it was extended to the airport on 18 April 1993.

A total of DM 356.7 million was invested for the upgrade of the line to the airport. Of this amount, DM 260 million was covered by funds for the establishment of the S-Bahn.

On 29 March 1993, it was decided to extend the S-Bahn to Filderstadt-Bernhausen. On 16 August 1993, the sixth contract for establishing the S-Bahn was signed. In 1994 and 1995, during construction work at the airport, an approximately 400-metre-long tunnel section was built as cut and cover. Subsequently, the remaining 2.2 kilometres were bored from 1998. The bored tunnel cost DM 129.5 million and the adjoining railway station cost DM 47.53 million. The town of Filderstadt provided funds of DM 31.8 million. The town spent an additional DM 22.5 million on further measures, such as commuter parking and the renovation of the old station building, Overall, the S-Bahn extension thus cost DM 199.4 million.

A single-track extension was opened to Filderstadt-Bernhausen on 29 September 2001. The new station is underground but part of the roof consists of windows. Although freight traffic was originally planned between Rohr and Leinfelden, no freight traffic now operates over the line. A bridge in Leinfelden, which was built in 1993, was intended for a siding, but it was never used for this purpose; it has been used for Stadtbahn operations since October 2015.

The line's signal technology was improved in 2007 and 2008. As a result of this upgrade, which cost approximately €1.7 million, S-Bahn services on the line can now operate at five-minute intervals. These measures became necessary because passenger traffic increases to two to three times as many as usual were counted on days with public exhibitions.

== Projects ==
=== Stuttgart 21 ===
The Stuttgart 21 project will mean that, in addition to the 148 S-Bahn trains per day that run on the Stuttgart-Rohr–Filderstadt line today, 62 mainline and regional trains will be added to the line (in both cases the sum of both directions). The line will be used for the section between Stuttgart-Rohr and Stuttgart Hauptbahnhof instead of the Gäu Railway.

Under the Stuttgart 21 project, the planned Rohr curve is planned to connect the line in Stuttgart-Rohr to the Gäu Railway running south. The exemption necessary for long-distance and regional services to run through the airport tunnel is controversial.

At the eastern end of the airport station, a two-track connection is to be established to the new Stuttgart–Wendlingen high-speed railway towards Stuttgart Hauptbahnhof via the airport curve (Flughafenkurve).

Planning approval for section 1.3 of the Stuttgart 21 project, which also covered the new construction and upgraded infrastructure on the Rohr–Filderstadt railway, was sought in October 2002. Planning approval for some works in the later stages of the project is still pending.

Between 25,200 and 36,100 passengers are expected daily between the Rohr curve and the airport, depending on the section of the line (sum of both directions) in 2025. This represents an increase of 6,400 to 10,600 passengers compared to 2010. The section between the airport and Filderstadt is expected to drop by 200 to 8,100 passengers. The extension of the line to Neuhausen is not included in the forecast.

=== Extension to Neuhausen ===
There are plans to extend the S-Bahn line to Neuhausen. The two-track line will include an approximately 3.9 kilometre-long section of new construction and new stations in Filderstadt-Sielmingen (in a cutting) and Neuhausen (above ground), each with 210 metres-long and 96 centimetre-high platforms. A storage facility for four S-Bahn sets will be provided in Neuhausen. The line extension is expected to run on the route of the old Filder Railway. In Bernhausen a tunnel is provided to the outskirts of Filderstadt/Bernhausen. Commissioning is scheduled for May 2019 (as of August 2013).
