= Stuttgart S-Bahn =

Suburban railway system serving the Stuttgart Region

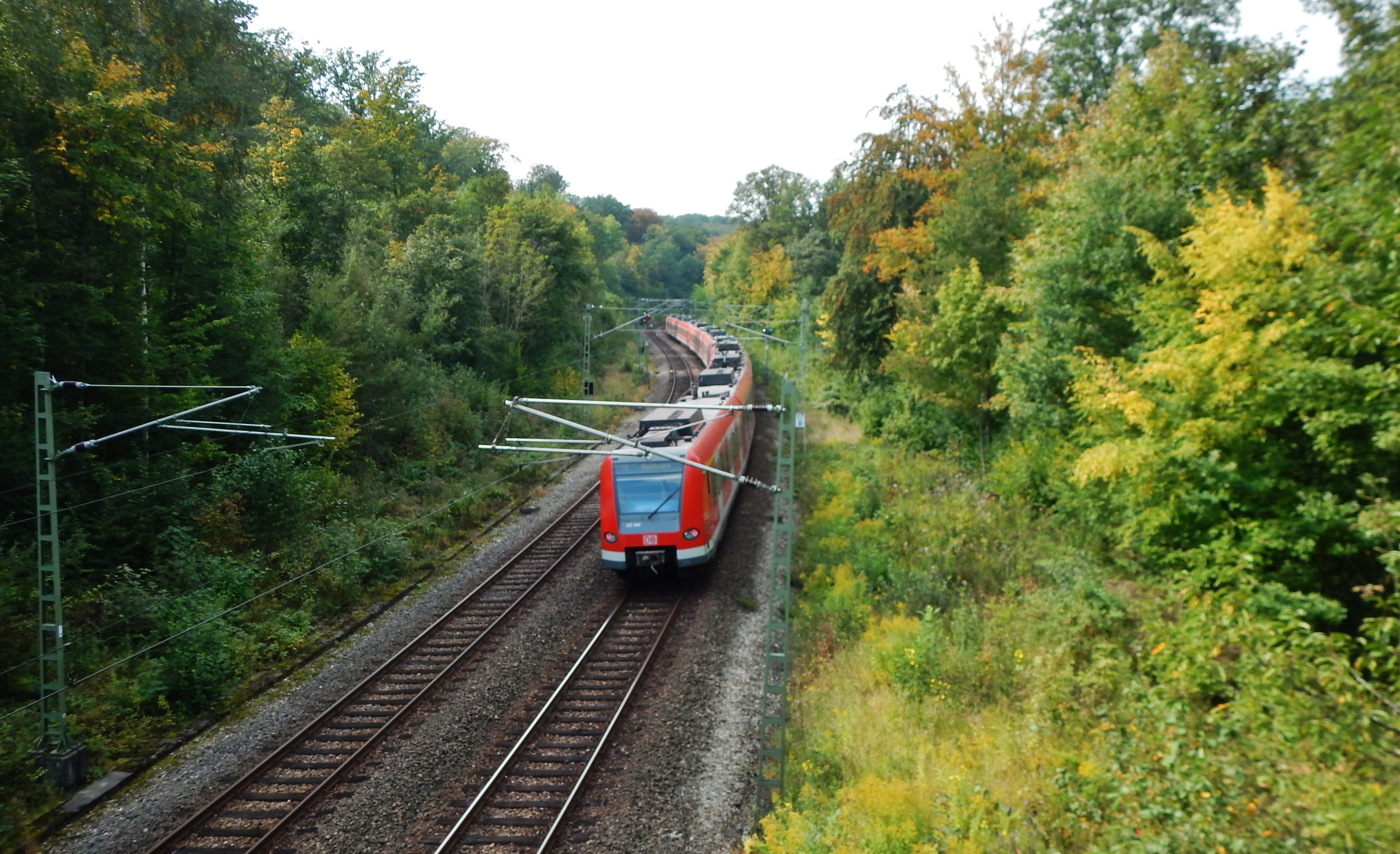

Overview
- Locale: Stuttgart Region, Germany
- Transit type: S-train
- Number of lines: 7
- Number of stations: 83 (7 underground)
- Daily ridership: 435,000 on weekdays (2018)
- Annual ridership: 128 million (2017)
- Website: http://www.s-bahn-stuttgart.de/

Operation
- Number of vehicles: 60 DBAG Class 423; 155 DBAG Class 430

Technical
- System length: 215 km (134 mi)
- Track gauge: 1,435 mm (4 ft 8 1/2 in) standard gauge
System map

The Stuttgart S-Bahn is a suburban railway system (S-Bahn) serving the Stuttgart Region, an urban agglomeration of around 2.7 million people, consisting of the city of Stuttgart and the adjacent districts of Esslingen, Böblingen, Ludwigsburg and Rems-Murr-Kreis.

The Stuttgart S-Bahn comprises seven lines numbered S1 through S6 and S60, and is operated by S-Bahn Stuttgart, a subsidiary of Deutsche Bahn. The system is integrated with the regional transport association, the Verkehrs- und Tarifverbund Stuttgart (VVS), which coordinates tickets and fares among all transport operators in the metropolitan area.

== Lines ==
All lines lead through the city centre of Stuttgart. The northeastern end of the tunnel (from the tracks near Stuttgart Hauptbahnhof through Schwabstraße) was the first part of the tunnel to open and has been used since the beginning, the southwestern end from Schwabstraße through Universität since 1985.

The main node to change for Stuttgart Stadtbahn is at Stuttgart Hauptbahnhof, but at Stuttgart Stadtmitte S-Bahn-station, you can get to some more lines of the Stadtbahn (with the station's name being Rotebühlplatz). In the outer city districts there are nodes of S-Bahn and Stadtbahn at Stuttgart-Bad Cannstatt station and Stuttgart-Vaihingen station.

Line	Route	Length	Railways used
S 1	Kirchheim (Teck) – Wendlingen – Plochingen – Esslingen – Bad Cannstatt – Hauptbahnhof – Schwabstraße – Vaihingen – Rohr – Böblingen – Herrenberg	71 km	Teck Railway – Plochingen–Immendingen railway/Fils Valley Railway – Verbindungsbahn – Stuttgart–Horb railway
S 2	Schorndorf – Waiblingen – Bad Cannstatt – Hauptbahnhof – Schwabstraße – Vaihingen – Rohr – Flughafen/Messe – Filderstadt	57 km	Stuttgart-Bad Cannstatt–Nördlingen railway – Plochingen–Immendingen railway/Fils Valley Railway – Verbindungsbahn – Stuttgart–Horb railway – Stuttgart-Rohr–Filderstadt railway
S 3	Backnang – Waiblingen – Bad Cannstatt – Hauptbahnhof – Schwabstraße – Vaihingen – Rohr – Flughafen/Messe	50 km	Waiblingen–Schwäbisch Hall railway – Stuttgart-Bad Cannstatt–Nördlingen railway – Fils Valley Railway – Verbindungsbahn – Stuttgart–Horb railway – Stuttgart-Rohr–Filderstadt railway
S 4	Schwabstraße – Hauptbahnhof – Zuffenhausen – Ludwigsburg – Marbach (Neckar) – Kirchberg (Murr) – Burgstall (Murr) – Backnang	41 km	Verbindungsbahn – Franconia Railway – Backnang–Ludwigsburg railway
S 5	Schwabstraße – Hauptbahnhof – Zuffenhausen – Ludwigsburg – Bietigheim Bissingen	26 km	Verbindungsbahn – Franconia Railway
S 6	Schwabstraße – Hauptbahnhof – Zuffenhausen – Leonberg – Weil der Stadt	35 km	Verbindungsbahn – Franconia Railway – Black Forest Railway
S 60	Schwabstraße – Hauptbahnhof – Zuffenhausen – Leonberg – Renningen – Magstadt – Maichingen – Sindelfingen – Böblingen	45 km	Rankbach Railway

== Schedule ==
The Stuttgart S-Bahn has a "memory schedule" or clock-face schedule. The basic cycle is one train per hour and line (which is only used early in the morning and late in the evening). During the day, there are usually additional trains which increases the cycle for each line to every 30 minutes (outside of rush hour) or 15 minutes (rush hour). Beginning at Schwabstraße and heading towards Hauptbahnhof, the schedule is as follows:

- xx:00 - S2 > Schorndorf
- xx:03 - S4 > Marbach
- xx:10 - S3 > Backnang
- xx:13 - S6 > Weil der Stadt
- xx:20 - S1 > Kirchheim u. Teck
- xx:23 - S5 > Bietigheim

If there are additional trains, these times repeat at 15- or 30-minute intervals (which means that during rush hour the S4 will depart on e.g. 07:03 AM, 07:18 AM, 07:33 AM and 07:48 AM). Some additional trains do not travel the full length of the track, e.g. there are some trains of line S1 that shuttle between Esslingen and Schwabstraße or Plochingen and Schwabstraße instead of continuing through to Kirchheim u. Teck.

== History ==
Suburban transport in Stuttgart has been operated since 1933, initially along electric lines from the Central Station until 1978. The primary line was from Esslingen to Ludwigsburg while changing direction in Stuttgart Central Station.

The first steps toward an S-Bahn in Stuttgart began after World War II. With the Stuttgart Central Station moved to its current location in the 1920s, the focus was shifted to construction of a downtown railway tunnel to improve access to the central city and points south. Simultaneously, the Stuttgart streetcar company was embarking on plans to build tunnels downtown for their system. Additionally, extra tracks were added to several outlying rail corridors in preparation for eventual S-Bahn service.

After financing agreements between the city, state and federal government and the state railway Deutsche Bundesbahn were reached, construction on the downtown tunnel from Stuttgart Central Station to Schwabstraße began on July 5, 1971. Work was completed in September 1978 and operation of the Stuttgart S-Bahn began with three lines (all beginning at Schwabstraße station): the S1 to Plochingen via Esslingen, the S4 to Ludwigsburg and the S6 to Weil der Stadt via Feuerbach and Leonberg.

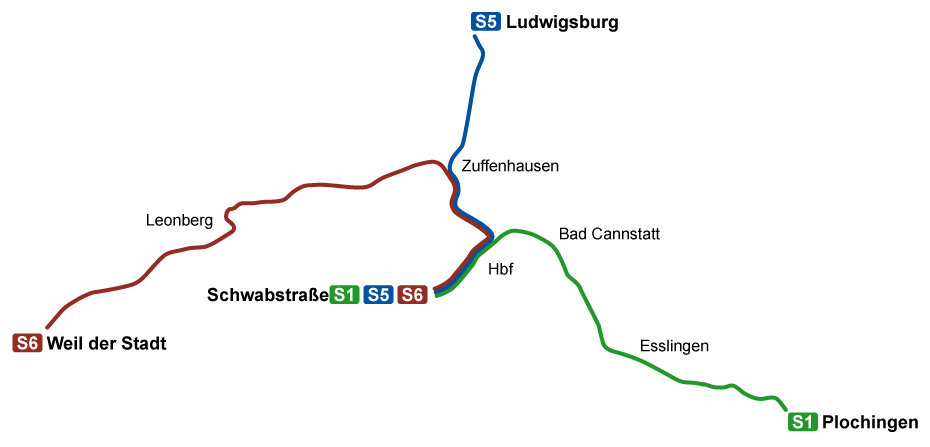
Initial Stuttgart S-Bahn network in 1978

Over the following years, the network has been extended to Bietigheim, Backnang and Schorndorf (1981) and the southern branches to Böblingen (1985), Herrenberg (1992) and Airport (1993). The S2 was then extended beyond the airport, connecting Filderstadt with the network.

The latest changes are the addition of Kirchheim unter Teck to the end of the S1 and the construction of a first tangential line S60 from Böblingen to Maichingen, Renningen and Schwabstraße (S6) and the extension of line S4 to Backnang.

Stuttgart S-Bahn development

== Operation ==
The 215 km long system has 83 stations and serves approximately 435,000 passengers every workday. The trains operate on the standard gauge tracks of the Deutsche Bahn AG (DBAG) and are powered by single phase AC at 15 kV and 16.67 hertz, taken from overhead wires.

Installation of new passenger information systems began in December 2004. These systems indicate the actual real-time status for the next three trains rather than just the scheduled departure time and route of the next train.

Stuttgart S-Bahn, Bad Cannstatt station

All seven S-Bahn lines travel under the downtown area to Schwabstraße, and three continue on to Vaihingen through a dual-track tunnel. This tunnel (Verbindungsbahn, however, presents a bottleneck that limits train headways to two and a half minutes, meaning that trains on each individual line can only run at 15-minute headways.

=== Operational improvements ===
- 1996: Introduction of 15-minute headways during morning rush hour
- June 1997: Introduction of 30-minute headways in the evening until 10:00pm on all lines
- January 2000: New S-Bahn ET 423 trainsets placed into operation on the S1
- January 2001: Improved train capacities (full-length trains) on workdays up to the end of shopping hours
- June 2001: Improved train capacities (full-length trains) on Saturdays up to the end of shopping hours
- June 2001: Introduction of 30-minute headways (except on the S3 and S4) during the late evenings through the end of service
- April 2002: Complete introduction of 30-minute headways on all lines during the late evenings through the end of service
- May 2003: 25 new ET 423 trainsets placed into service
- December 2003: Expansion of the 15-minute headways to the evening rush hours (Monday through Friday)
- Summer 2004: Pilot project of early morning service to airport
- Summer 2005: Continuation of airport early morning service pilot project
- April 2006: Introduction of two prototypes of trainsets renewed as ET 420Plus on the S1, S4 and S5 lines
- June 2010: Establishing of the first tangential line S60 from Böblingen (S1) to Maichingen
- December 2012: Extension of line S4 to Backnang and line S60 to Renningen
- May 2013: The new ET 430 trainsets, which are due to replace the aging ET 420 sets over the next years, enter into service on the southern lines (S1, and later S2 / S3). They are later indefinitely removed from service due to technical problems with the passenger doors.
- December 2014: afternoon peak period is extended to start at 15:30 (15:00 on S1) and end at 19:30
- December 2015: services are offered until 1:00 on working days
- December 2016: night services (on weekends and before holidays) are offered on an hourly basis throughout
- December 2017: afternoon peak period is extended to 15:00 and 20:30
- December 2018: morning peak period is extended to 10:00, early services to Stuttgart airport depart as early as 4:00 from all terminal stations
- December 2019: afternoon peak period begins at 12:00
- December 2020: remaining peak period gap (10:00 to 12:00) to be closed, 15-minute intervals from 6:00 to 20:30 throughout
- 2021/22: all peak-period services are delivered with full-length trains (3 units)

=== Headways ===
At first, the shortest headway (the time between vehicle arrivals at a given point) on each line was 20 minutes. Headways were subsequently improved on the S1 between Schwabstraße and Esslingen and on the S6 between Schwabstraße and Leonberg to 10 minutes. Beginning in 1996, 15-minute headways during rush hours were introduced on all lines. This was accomplished with supplemental trains and operational changes along the outlying segments. This allowed the overall headway on the central trunk section to remain at 2.5 minutes.

All lines currently converge in the central trunk section of the track. This results in steady headways to Rohr, Waiblingen, and Ludwigsburg. The section from Vaihingen to Bad Cannstatt and Zuffenhausen has an optimal 10-minute headway during the day.

As early as 2015, introducing ETCS on the core section has been considered. In early 2017, Verband Region Stuttgart (VRS), the state of Baden-Württemberg and DB Netz announced to spend a million Euros on a feasibility study on ETCS for S-Bahn Stuttgart. After a Request for tender, four offers were received and the contract concluded in October 2017. ETCS proved to be technically feasible and useful to reduce headways. The final report, published in early 2019, concluded that headways in the central core section of the network could be reduced by some 20 percent.

On January 30, 2019, the regional parliament enacted a package of measures. Based on the introduction of ETCS, the train operating contract was extended to mid 2032 and 56 further S-Bahn trainsets were to be purchased.

VRS expects to reduce 15-minute intervals to 10-minute intervals through ETCS.

=== Fleet ===
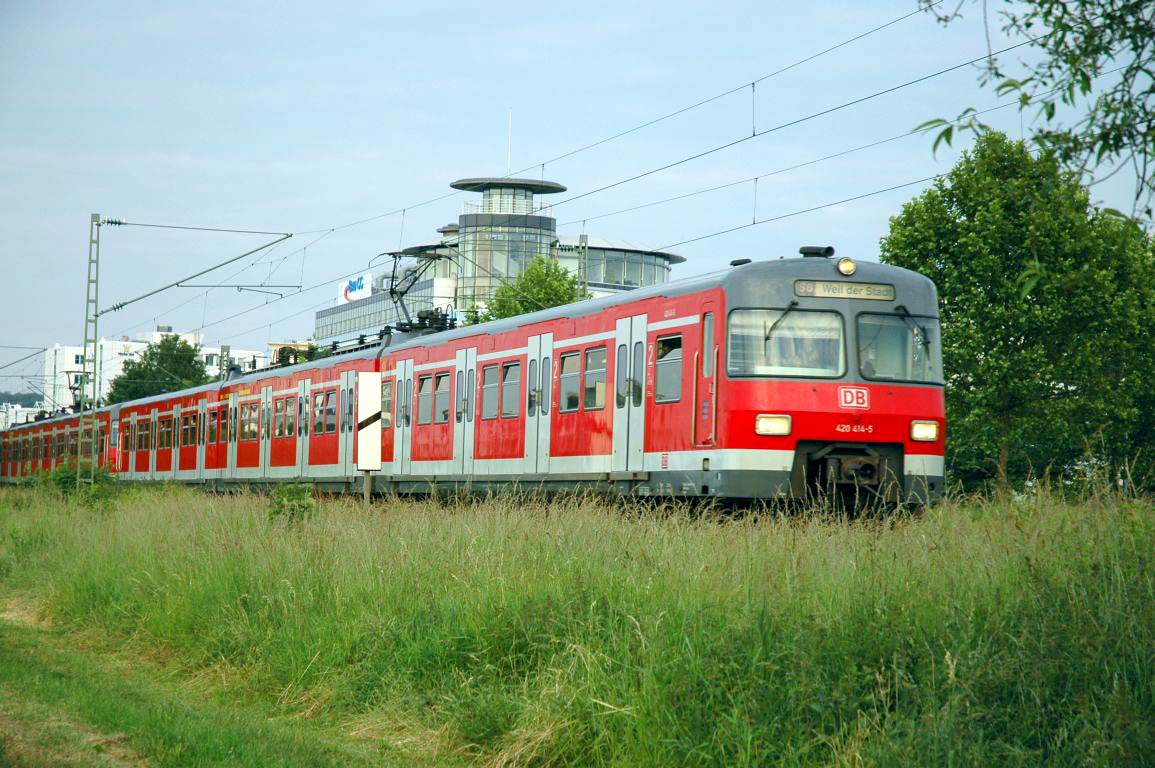
Class 420 train set on the Stuttgart S-Bahn

As of July 7, 2005, the fleet consisted of ninety Class 420 train sets and sixty Class 423 sets. The Class 423 trains ply the S1 and S3 lines, while the 420s are in use along the other lines. Maintenance of the trains and power units takes place in the S-Bahn service yard at the original eastern terminus of line S1 in Plochingen. This yard is equipped with the latest wheel lathes and washing and graffiti-cleaning equipment. About 550 employees working in three shifts keep the S-Bahn in service. On May 5, 2009, Bombardier and Alstom announced they received an order for 83 Class 430 train sets (including an option for another 83 sets) to replace the Class 420 from 2012 on.

The deployment of the Class 430 trains was delayed in July 2013 after several failures of the doors and retractable steps. These problems, along with unrelated signal failures, resulted in widespread delays on the S-Bahn system, especially on the S1, S2, and S3 lines. It was decided that the retractable step feature would be disabled and Class 430 trains will be gradually introduced beginning on December 15, 2013. By April 2014, 36 of the 430 train sets were in service with the S1 line completely converted.

== Expansion projects ==
The following expansions of the Stuttgart S-Bahn system are currently in planning or underway:

- Stuttgart 21 Project: In conjunction with Deutsche Bahn's massive plan to rebuild the Stuttgart Central Station underground and restructure rail traffic through the city, changes to the S-Bahn are planned as well. A new station ("Mittnachtstraße") along the central trunk north of the central station is scheduled to be complete in 2025. Besides serving the new residential areas to be built on the site of the former rail yard, this station would provide a transfer point between the eastern and western sections of the network and would also provide an emergency transfer location from the S-Bahn to the Stadtbahn in case an incident closes the central S-Bahn tunnel.
- Extension to Murrhardt: Studies have identified the potential for an extension of the S-Bahn to Murrhardt. Given that most passengers are headed toward Backnang, Waiblingen, and Stuttgart, an extension of the S3 is more favorable. At present, discussions are underway regarding financing.
- Extension to Neuhausen: A project to extend the S2 from Filderstadt to Neuhausen is currently being planned and financing agreement between the state, district of Esslingen, and the cities of Neuhausen and Filderstadt is being developed. This project is envisioned as part of a combined project to also extend the U6 Stadtbahn line to the airport.
- Extension to Calw: An extension of the S6 from Weil der Stadt to Calw is in planning.

Additional projects not in active planning at present:

- Airport – Plochingen connection: Due to a negative cost-benefit ratio (based on the need for a climbing tunnel), as well as regional network changes planned for Stuttgart 21, this project has been abandoned.
- Untertürkheim – Kornwestheim: At present, four regional trains make this connection every weekday. Despite this project's potential in providing a direct connection from Esslingen to Ludwigsburg, budgetary constraints and other projects in the region have caused this plan to be shelved for the time being.
- Extension to Göppingen: A 2012 study determined that an extension of the S1 to Göppingen would be operationally feasible. However, a cost-benefit analysis in 2014 showed that the project was not financially feasible at that time, mainly because of good existing regional train services. Trains between Göppingen and Stuttgart became part of the VVS cooperative pricing structure on 1 January 2014, so an updated review of the rail situation in Göppingen will be done to determine further feasibility of an S-Bahn connection. If built, this would be the first leg in a possible future extension to Geislingen.
- Northwestern extensions: Two extensions from Bietigheim-Bissingen are in early consideration. One extension to Vaihingen an der Enz is undertaking a feasibility study. The other extension, to Kirchheim am Neckar, is awaiting a regional transportation plan that will include ridership projections. In the meantime, good access via regional trains is available.
- Nordkreuz: The Stuttgart Regional government considers the improvement of transportation across the Nordkreuz (Northcross) from Bad Cannstatt to Nordbahnhof to be necessary. This idea, under consideration since the 1990s, emerged during planning from the Stuttgart 21 project and would provide relief along the central city tunnel trunk section and also allow for a bypass of the tunnel in the event of an emergency. It also would allow for new connections and travel options. While officials consider the plan to have its own merit, further consideration is on hold pending the completion of planning for the Stuttgart 21 project.

== See also ==
- List of commuter rail systems
