= Schorndorf station =

Railway station in Schorndorf, Baden-Württemberg, Germany

Schorndorf
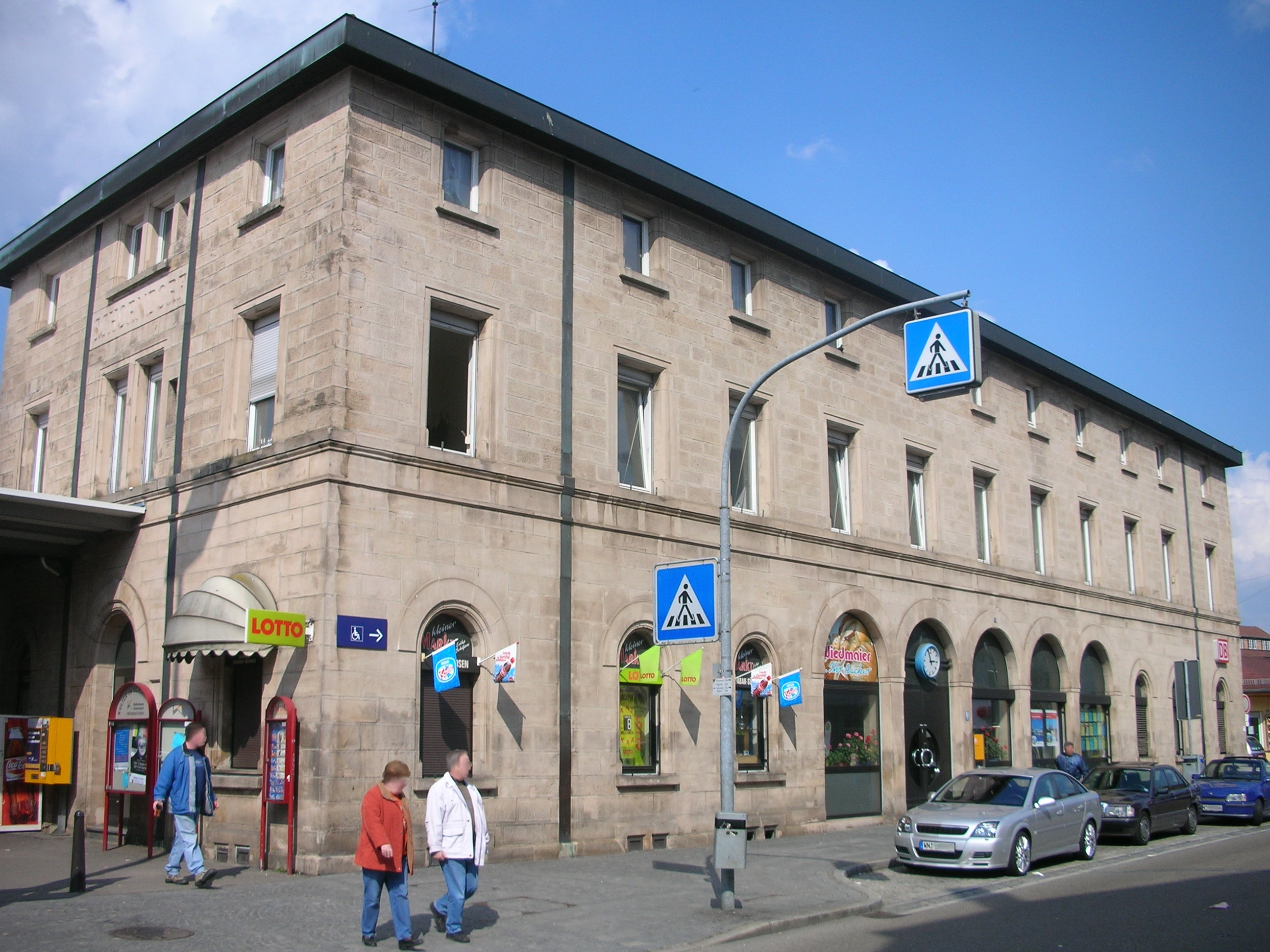

General information
- Location: Bahnhof 1, Schorndorf, Baden-Württemberg; Germany
- Coordinates: 48°48′25″N 9°31′35″E
- Lines: Stuttgart–Nördlingen; Wieslauf Valley Railway
- Platforms: 6

Construction
- Accessible: Yes

Other information
- Station code: 5682
- DS100 code: TSF
- IBNR: 8012700
- Category: 3
- Fare zone: : 4
- Website: www.bahnhof.de

History
- Opened: 23 June 1861

Passengers
- ~10,000

Services
Preceding station	DB Fernverkehr	Following station
Stuttgart Hbf towards Karlsruhe Hbf	IC 61	Schwäbisch Gmünd towards Nürnberg Hbf or Leipzig Hbf
Preceding station		Following station
Stuttgart Hbf towards Karlsruhe Hbf	RE 1	Schwäbisch Gmünd towards Aalen Hbf
Waiblingen towards Stuttgart Hbf	MEX 13	Urbach (b Schorndorf) towards Crailsheim
Preceding station	Württembergische Eisenbahn-Gesellschaft	Following station
Terminus	RB 61	Schorndorf-Hammerschlag towards Rudersberg-Oberndorf
Preceding station	Stuttgart S-Bahn	Following station
Weiler (Rems) towards Filderstadt	S2	Terminus
Location

Schorndorf station is in the city of Schorndorf in the German state of Baden-Württemberg. It was opened in 1861 along with the Stuttgart-Bad Cannstatt–Nördlingen railway from Stuttgart to Aalen. The abbreviation of the station is TSF and it is currently used by about 10,000 passengers a day.

== Location ==
The station is situated on the northern edge of the historic Altstadt of the city of Schorndorf in the centre of the city. Next to the station to its east is the central bus station, to the west was the former freight yard.

== Layout of the station ==
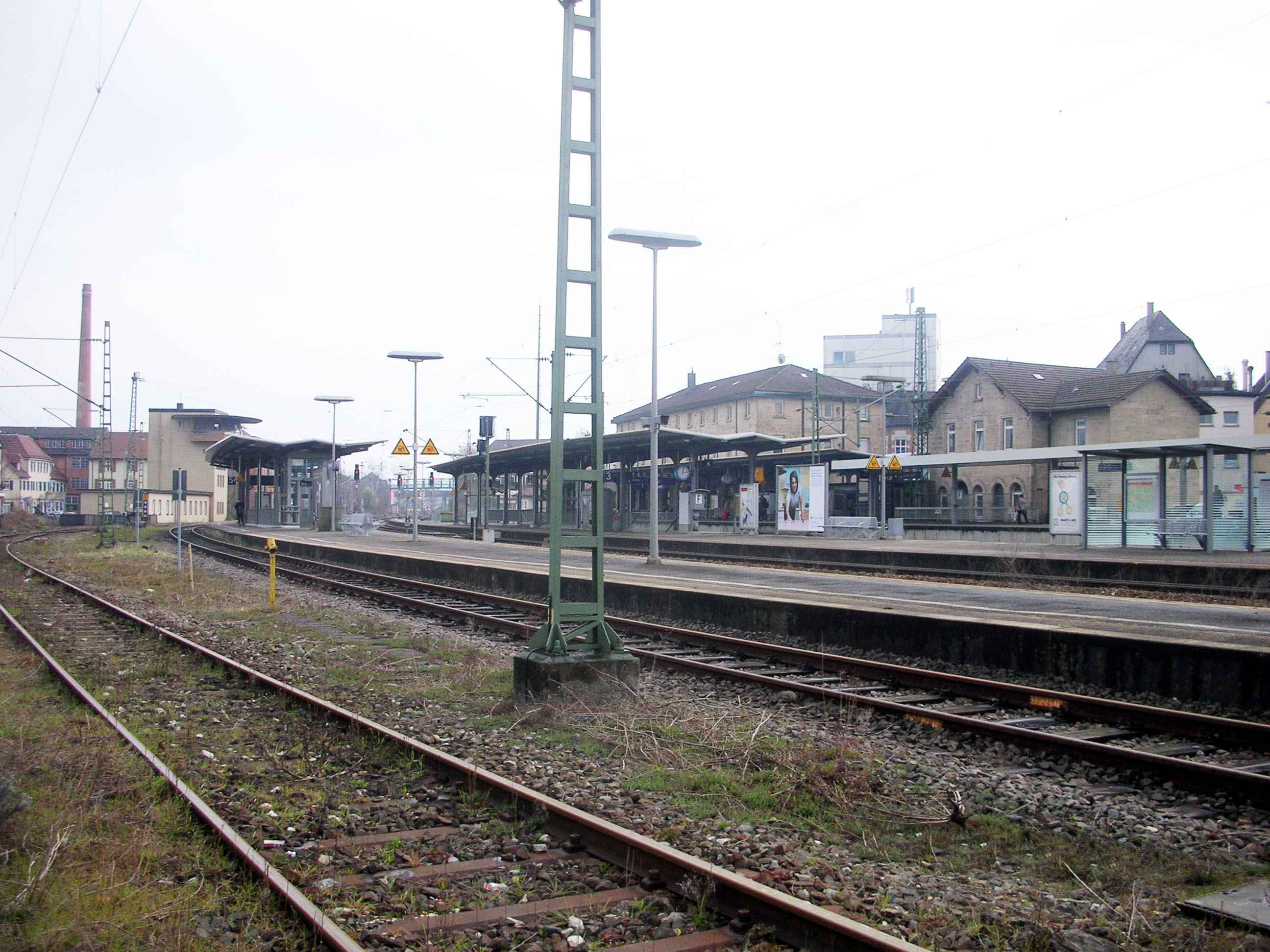
Looking over the tracks towards Aalen

The station consists of a Renaissance Revival reception building completed in 1863 with some later additions.

It has six tracks, namely platform tracks 1–5 and track 14 to the west of the station. Tracks 1–3 and track 5 are in normal use while track 14 is occasionally used for S-Bahn services. Otherwise, this track is mostly used for storing S-Bahn trains.

Track 5 is used exclusively for services of the Wieslauf Valley Railway. It is—since the removal of an eastern connection—only connected on the western side of the station to the Rems Railway.

All platforms are equipped with ramps and lifts for access for the disabled.

As part of the economic stimulus platform, the reception building was rehabilitated with energy-related measures. In addition, the platform roof on the main platform is being renovated.

== History ==
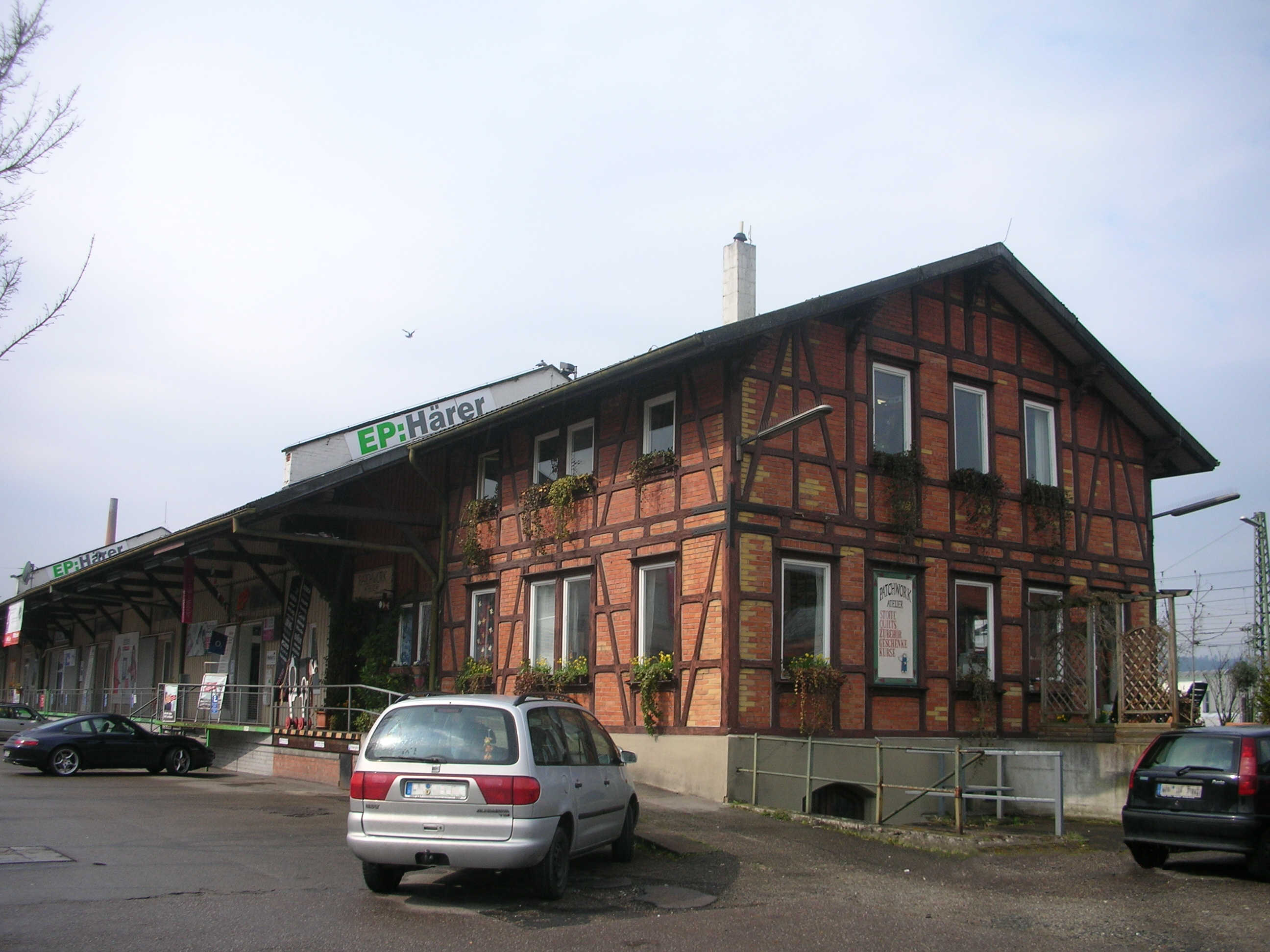
Former freight yard

With the completion of the Fils Valley Railway in 1850, construction of the Rems Railway began in 1858. The line was originally planned in 1845 to pass south of the city of Schorndorf. The local council and the citizens' committee decided in 1858 not to support this solution. Construction of the section through Schorndorf began in 1860.

The railway construction occurred at a time of great misery in Schorndorf and saved many people from starvation or emigration. The station was built between the former centre, now the Old City (Altstadt) and the suburbs. A trial run on the section from Cannstatt to Schorndorf was celebrated at the station on 23 June 1861. The station was opened on 18 July 1861. A week later, on 25 July 1861, scheduled operation started on the line from Cannstatt to Wasseralfingen (to the east of Aalen). On 3 October 1863, the line (now part of the Stuttgart-Bad Cannstatt–Nördlingen railway) was opened from Wasseralfingen to Nördlingen.

In 1873 and 1874, there were also plans for a connection from Schorndorf to Plochingen, but this project was rejected. Other plans had called for a line from Schorndorf to Ludwigsburg, but this idea was not realized.

In 1908, the Wieslauf Valley Railway opened and Schorndorf station became a junction.

Schorndorf station signal box "Sf" (s=Schorndorf, f=dispatcher) of class Sp Dr S59 (track map push-button switchboard from Siemens, class 59) was put into operation in 1962, but it was closed on 1 July 2001. Since then, Schorndorf station has been remotely controlled from Waiblingen.

== Operations ==
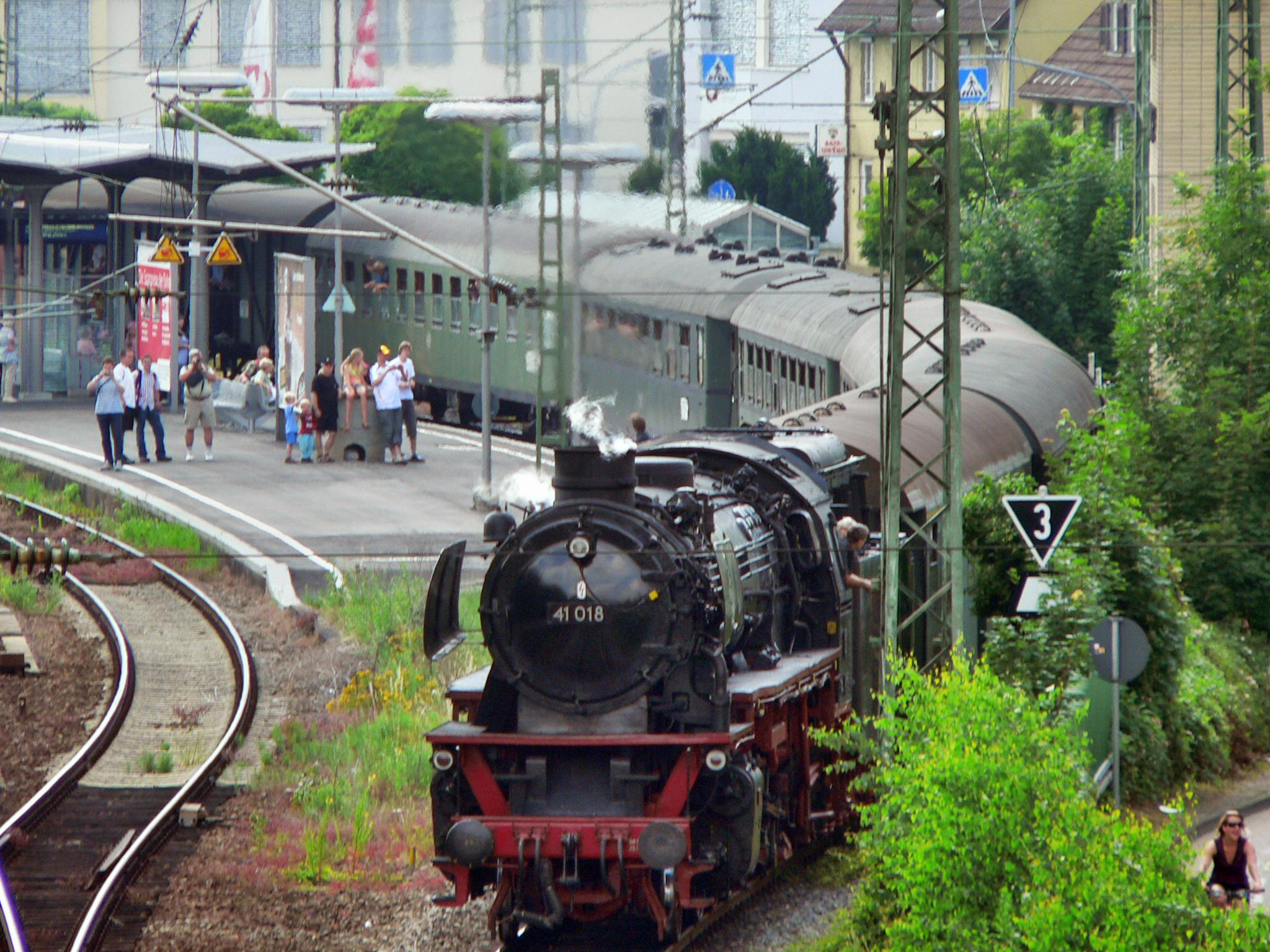
Steam train on Wieslauf Valley Railway at Schorndorf

The station is classified by Deutsche Bahn as a category 3 station.

=== Long distance ===
In the early morning and late evening some InterCity trains on the IC 61 Karlsruhe–Nuremberg–Leipzig route stop at Schorndorf station.

=== Regional transport ===
Schorndorf is an intermediate station of regional services (line RB13/R2) running every half hour from Stuttgart to Aalen. It is served every two hours by Interregio-Express trains from Karlsruhe to Aalen. Schorndorf station is the terminus of line S2 of the Stuttgart S-Bahn from Filderstadt. The Wieslauf Valley Railway, operated by the Württembergische Eisenbahn-Gesellschaft, branches off east of the station to the north to Rudersberg.

Line	Route	Frequency
RE 1	Karlsruhe – Stuttgart – Schorndorf – Schwäbisch Gmünd – Aalen	Every two hours (sometimes hourly)
MEX 13	Stuttgart – Schorndorf – Schwäbisch Gmünd – Aalen (– Ellwangen – Crailsheim)	Every half hour; to Ellwangen every hour, to Crailsheim every two hours
MEX 13	Schorndorf – Schwäbisch Gmünd – Aalen	Two connections on Fri/Sat and Sat/Sun nights and before holidays, connecting with S 2 from/to Stuttgart
RB 61	Schorndorf – Schlechtbach – Miedelsbach-Steinenberg – Rudersberg – Rudersberg Oberndorf	30 minutes
S 2	Schorndorf – Endersbach – Fellbach – Waiblingen – Nürnberger Straße – Bad Cannstatt – Hauptbahnhof – Stadtmitte – Schwabstraße – Vaihingen – Rohr – Flughafen/Messe – Filderstadt	30 minutes, 15 minutes in the peaks

=== Freight ===
West of the station is the siding of the logistics centre of the appliance manufacturer Bauknecht, owned by Whirlpool Corporation. It gets 20% of its incoming freight by rail.

There used to be an extensive industrial railway network in Schorndorf, connecting the Hammerschlag industrial area through the suburban streets to the Rems Railway. Even the Bauknecht factory had a rail connection until 2000.

== Services at the station ==
The station building has ticket counters, a bakery and a kiosk. In the neighbouring former Express freight building there is now a book and magazine store and an Internet café.
