= Leinfelden-Echterdingen =

- Town
- Coat of arms

- Location of Leinfelden-Echterdingen within Esslingen district
- Interactive map of Leinfelden-Echterdingen
- Location within Germany Location within Baden-Württemberg
- Coordinates: 48°41′34″N 9°8′34″E
- Country: Germany
- State: Baden-Württemberg
- Admin. region: Stuttgart
- District: Esslingen
- Founded: 1975
- Subdivisions: 4

Government
  - Mayor (2023–31): Otto Ruppaner

Area
  - Total: 29.89 km^{2} (11.54 sq mi)
- Elevation: 432 m (1,417 ft)

Population (2025-12-31)
  - Total: 41,448
  - Density: 1,387/km^{2} (3,591/sq mi)
- Time zone: UTC+01:00 (CET)
  - Summer (DST): UTC+02:00 (CEST)
- Postal codes: 70771
- Dialling codes: 0711
- Vehicle registration: ES
- Website: www.leinfelden-echterdingen.de

Leinfelden-Echterdingen (German pronunciation: [ˈlaɪ̯nˌfɛldn̩ ˈɛçtɐdɪŋən]; Swabian: Laefälda-Ächdordeng) is a town in the district of Esslingen, in Baden-Württemberg, Germany. It is located approximately 10 km south of Stuttgart, near the Stuttgart Airport and directly adjacent to the newly built Stuttgart Trade Fair. The town was formed on 1 January 1975 by the merging of four former municipalities: Leinfelden, Echterdingen, Musberg and Stetten auf den Fildern. Zeppelin LZ 4 caught fire and burned out in Echterdingen in August 1908.

== Twin towns – sister cities ==
Leinfelden-Echterdingen is twinned with:

- Manosque, France (1973)
- Poltava, Ukraine (1988)
- York, United States (1989)
- Voghera, Italy (2000)

== Economy ==
Daimler Truck is headquartered in the town.
