= Neuhausen auf den Fildern =

- Municipality
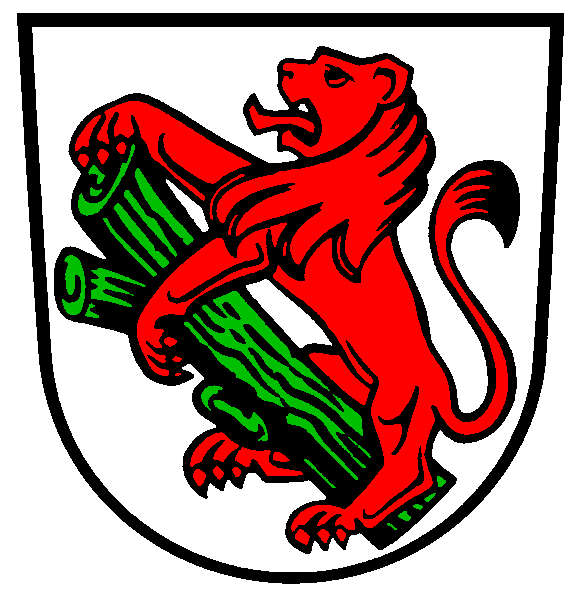
- Coat of arms

- Location of Neuhausen auf den Fildern within Esslingen district
- Interactive map of Neuhausen auf den Fildern
- Location within Germany Location within Baden-Württemberg
- Coordinates: 48°41′4″N 9°16′28″E
- Country: Germany
- State: Baden-Württemberg
- Admin. region: Stuttgart
- District: Esslingen

Government
  - Mayor (2019–27): Ingo Hacker

Area
  - Total: 12.47 km^{2} (4.81 sq mi)
- Elevation: 320 m (1,050 ft)

Population (2025-12-31)
  - Total: 12,449
  - Density: 998.3/km^{2} (2,586/sq mi)
- Time zone: UTC+01:00 (CET)
  - Summer (DST): UTC+02:00 (CEST)
- Postal codes: 73765
- Dialling codes: 07158
- Vehicle registration: ES
- Website: www.neuhausen-fildern.de

Neuhausen auf den Fildern is a municipality in the district of Esslingen in Baden-Württemberg in southern Germany. It is located 13 km southeast of Stuttgart. It is the birthplace of the Fortepiano builder Anton Walter.

== Demographics ==
Population development:

| Year | Inhabitants |
|---|---|
| 1990 | 10.851 |
| 2001 | 11.097 |
| 2011 | 11.175 |
| 2021 | 12.150 |
