= Stuttgart-Obertürkheim station =

Railway station in Germany

Stuttgart Obertürkheim
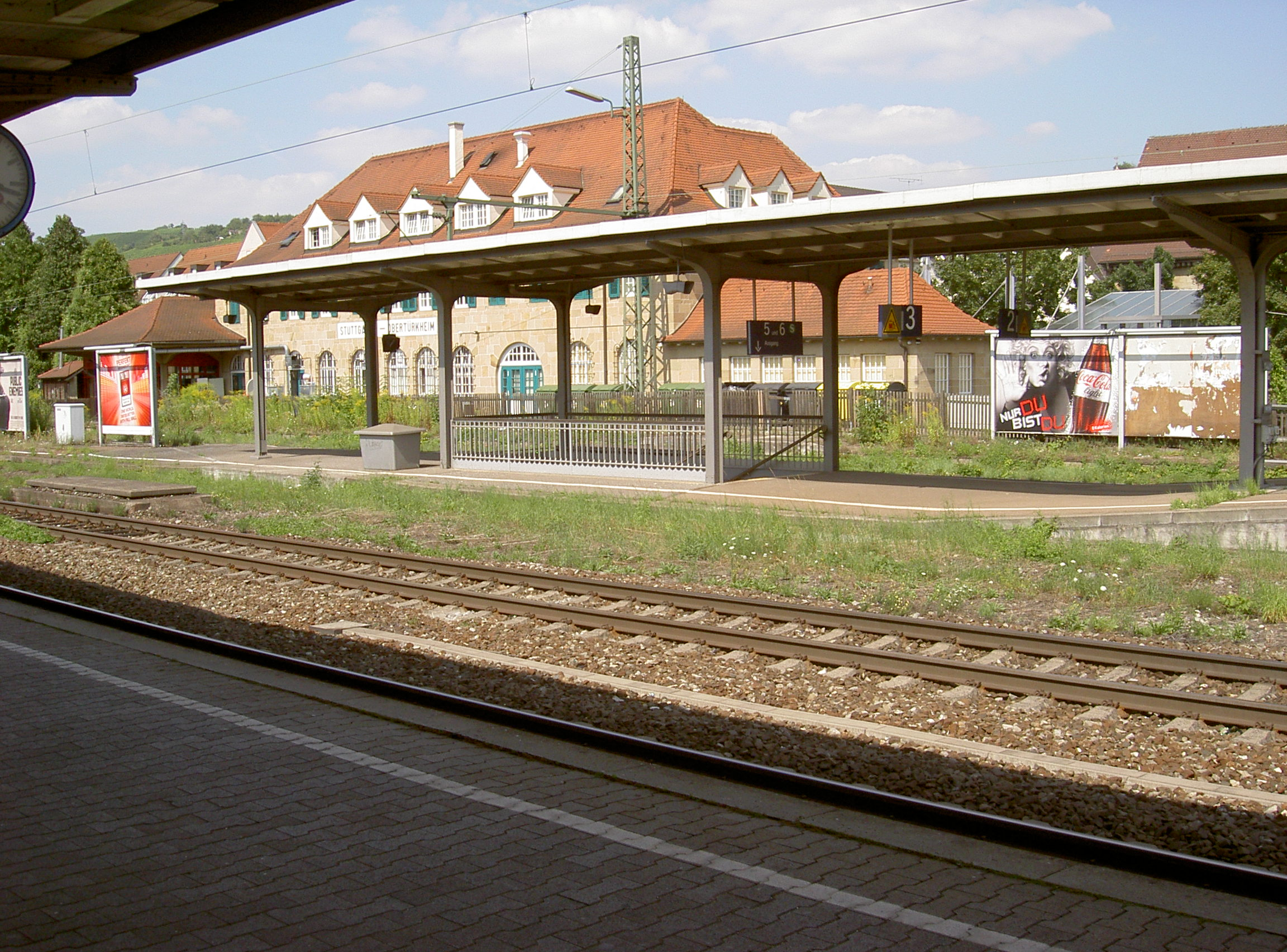

General information
- Location: Obertürkheim, Stuttgart, BW; Germany
- Coordinates: 48°45′42″N 9°16′5″E
- Lines: Fils Valley Railway (KBS 750, KBS 790.1)
- Platforms: 3

Construction
- Accessible: Yes

Other information
- Station code: 6081
- DS100 code: TSOM
- IBNR: 08005772
- Category: 4
- Fare zone: : 1 and 2
- Website: www.bahnhof.de

History
- Opened: 7 November 1845

Services
Preceding station	Stuttgart S-Bahn	Following station
Untertürkheim towards Herrenberg	S1	Esslingen-Mettingen towards Kirchheim (Teck)
Location

Obertürkheim station is located in the Stuttgart district of Obertürkheim in the German state of Baden-Württemberg. It is located at the 9.3 kilometer mark of the Fils Valley Railway and is a station on the network of Stuttgart S-Bahn.The station building is a listed building, which now houses apartments and shops.

== History ==
A station was built at Obertürkheim with the establishment of the Central Railway (German: Zentralbahn) of Württemberg from Stuttgart to Esslingen. At its opening, on 7 November 1845, it became the third station of the Royal Württemberg State Railways (Königlich Württembergische Staats-Eisenbahnen). Earth had to be brought in from Ailenberg (hill) in order to strengthen the foundation of the one-story entrance building. The building was later increased by another floor. In addition, a left and a right wing were added. The first floor was occupied by the station master and on the ground floor next to the waiting room, from 1855 to 1899, there was a post and telegraph office, which served the communities of Obertürkheim, Uhlbach and Hedelfingen.

In 1852, the State Railways duplicated the section of the Eastern Railway between Cannstatt and Plochingen. With the beginning of industrialisation in the wine community, the station gained a freight shed with a loading ramp in 1868.

From 24 May 1912, it became a tram terminus with the opening of the single line of the Esslingen tramway by the Eslingen Municipal Tramway Company (Eßlinger Städtische Straßenbahn, ESS). This ran from the station forecourt to Oberesslingen.

Increasing traffic made an enlargement of the station inevitable. The station building was no longer adequate. For the design of the new building the State Railways commissioned architect Martin Mayer, who also designed the new Bad Cannstatt station building, completed in 1915. Construction began in 1914, making it, along with the station buildings in Cannstatt and Mettingen, one of the last buildings built by the State Railways. The two-storey sandstone building is characterised by the lattice windows and green shutters on the platform side. The facade on the forecourt side with its two corner projections is very monumental. The intervening three round windows on the upper floor are similar to those at Cannstatt station. On the hip roof there are several dormers. Work was delayed by the First World War and the building was not completed until August 1918. The previous building, which was nearby, was maintained until 1929.

On 15 February 1919, the Stuttgart Tramway (Stuttgarter Straßenbahnen) extended its suburban network to Obertürkheim station forecourt, which operated as tram line 26 from Oberesslingen to Schlossplatz (palace square) in central Stuttgart.

On 1 April 1922, Obertürkheim was incorporated into Stuttgart and, on 1 December 1927, the station was renamed Stuttgart-Obertürkheim as a result.

On 14 October 1931, Deutsche Reichsbahn finished rebuilding the line from Cannstatt to Esslingen with four tracks. With the electrification of the Eastern Railway, Stuttgart suburban services began operating to Esslingen on 15 May 1933. Traffic on tram line 26 declined as a result. From 10 July 1944, the Esslingen trolleybus service replaced trams between Obertürkheim and Oberesslingen. Its route (currently numbered 101) has since connected Obertürkheim station with Lerchenäckern in Oberesslingen. By the 1950s, tram line 26 had been replaced by line 25, and by the 1970s by line 4.

In 1994, the Stuttgart tram line 4 was converted to standard gauge as Stadtbahn line 4, but it was cut back to end at Untertürkheim station. It has never been extended to Obertürkheim. Likewise an extension of the trolleybus route from Untertürkheim has received no encouragement.

== Rail services ==
The station is served by line S 1 of the Stuttgart S-Bahn. Platform track 5 is used for S-Bahn services towards Bad Cannstatt and track 6 for services towards Esslingen. Tracks 2 and 4 are used for long-distance passenger and freight traffic. Tracks 1 and 3 have been removed. The platforms can be reached through a tunnel, which runs between the main station building and the park-and-ride car park.

Obertürkheim station is classified by Deutsche Bahn as a category 4 station.

=== S-Bahn ===
Line	Route
S 1	Kirchheim (Teck) – Wendlingen – Plochingen – Esslingen – Obertürkheim – Neckarpark – Bad Cannstatt – Hauptbahnhof – Schwabstraße – Vaihingen – Rohr – Böblingen – Herrenberg (additional services in the peak between Esslingen and Böblingen)

=== Long-distance buses ===
Since 1 April 2010, one of the two bus terminals that have been established to replace the central bus station in Stuttgart as a result of the Stuttgart 21 project has been located on the west side of the station.
