= Stuttgart-Untertürkheim station =

Railway station in Stuttgart, Germany

Stuttgart Untertürkheim Pbf
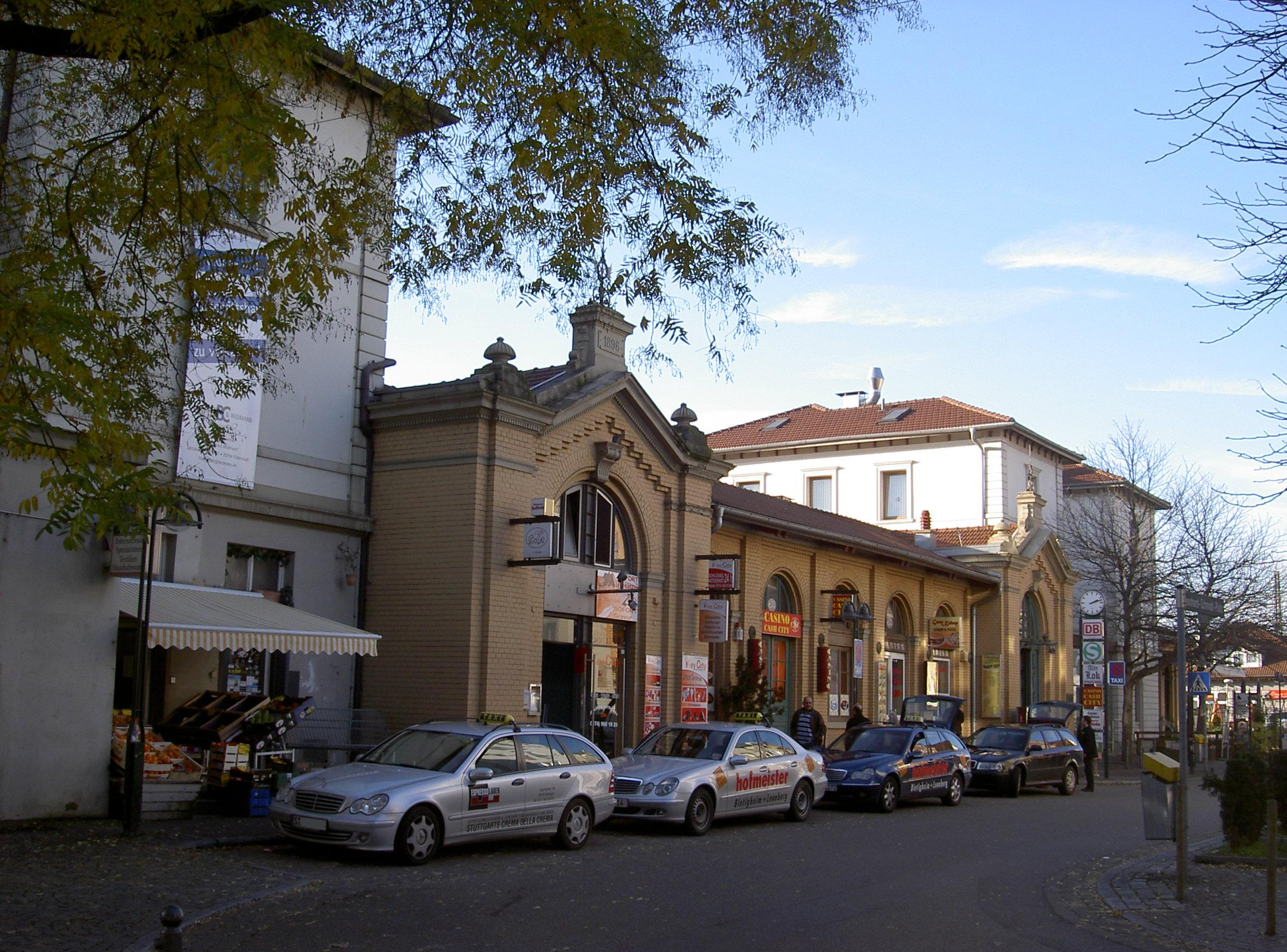

General information
- Location: Karl-Benz-Platz 15; Stuttgart, Baden-Württemberg; Germany
- Coordinates: 48°46′47″N 9°15′1″E
- Owner: Deutsche Bahn
- Operator: DB Netz; DB Station&Service
- Lines: Fils Valley Railway (KBS 750, KBS 790.1); Schuster Railway (KBS 790.11)
- Platforms: 5

Construction
- Accessible: Yes

Other information
- Station code: 6086
- DS100 code: TSU P
- IBNR: 8005775
- Category: 3
- Fare zone: : 1
- Website: www.bahnhof.de

History
- Opened: 22 October 1845

Services
Preceding station	DB Regio Baden-Württemberg	Following station
Stuttgart Ebitzweg towards Kornwestheim	RB 11	Terminus
Preceding station	Stuttgart S-Bahn	Following station
Neckarpark towards Herrenberg	S1	Obertürkheim towards Kirchheim (Teck)
Location

Untertürkheim station is a railway station in Untertürkheim, an outer district of Stuttgart, Germany, on the city's S-Bahn, or S-line. The station formerly included a freight yard and the abbreviation of the station precinct, including the yards, is TSU.

Located near Württemberg mountain, Untertürkheim is home to the headquarters of Daimler AG and the original Mercedes-Benz assembly plant.

== History ==
On 22 October 1845 the first railway line in Württemberg, the Central Railway (Zentralbahn) opened, connecting the small wine-growing community with Cannstatt, early five kilometres from Untertürkheim. On 7 November 1845 the line was extended to Obertürkheim.

The first station building was a single story and nearly identical with those in Cannstatt and Obertürkheim. Untertürkheim became a popular destination for day trippers, using the new transport system. Hikers and bathers travelled from nearby Stuttgart. The loading dock was mostly used for shipping agricultural produce to Stuttgart.

In the 1890s, the Royal Württemberg State Railways began to develop plans to reduce traffic at Stuttgart Hauptbahnhof (central station). It was proposed to create a bypass track for freight trains providing a direct link between the Eastern Railway and Northern Railway. Untertürkheim station was chosen as the starting point for the new line and as a location for a new freight yard and marshalling yard and Kornwestheim station was chosen as its end point. Construction work started in the spring of 1894. The new freight yard was built next to the street of Cannstatter Straße (Augsburger Straße since 1936) and opened in 1896, in the presence of King William II.

The length of the track field was about 2,300 metres and it was on average 125 metres wide. It included an administration building and several service buildings, loading docks for freight and military transport, five signal boxes for 162 sets of points, a separate platform for railway workers and a roundhouse with four stalls and a water tower.

At the passenger station there was the entrance building, which still exists, and an administration building, consisting of two wings and a central hall. In the southern wing there was until 1960 a post and telegraph office. In the north there was the parcel and express freight office. A residential building was added for railway staff.

Since 1 May 1897, the Rems Railway Curve (Remsbahnkurve) has provided a connection between the freight yard and the Rems Railway and the Murr Railway. Duplication of the line to Kornwestheim was completed on 23 September 1904.

After a few years, the marshalling yard was already overloaded. Planning for its expansion began in 1906. The establishment of a left-bank Neckar railway was debated between 1900 and 1907 to relieve the Eastern Railway. This project was never realised.

In 1911, a project to develop the freight yard failed due to lack of space. Instead, the railway authorities decided to build a new larger yard in Kornwestheim. Untertürkheim freight yard would in future be used only for local freight. Additional tracks to Cannstatt freight yard from this end were opened on 17 November 1912. On 13 November 1923, a connection (closed in the mid-1980s) was opened to the new freight yard in Gaisburg. Since 1958, there has been a connecting track to the station at the river port.

== Operations ==
The station is served by the line S 1 of the Stuttgart S-Bahn. Track 6 was built for the S-Bahn. Track 5 is assigned to S-Bahn services to Bad Cannstatt and track 6 to S-Bahn services to Esslingen. An individual Regionalbahn service operates on track 2, running on the Schuster Railway between Kornwestheim and Untertürkheim. Tracks 1, 3 and 4 are used by non-stopping trains. The station is classified by Deutsche Bahn as a category 3 station.

In the 1980s the yard was declared a satellite of the Kornwestheim yard and lost its importance. Freight is not loaded there. Many of its tracks are used as sidings for freight trains. Part of it is already overgrown and some of its tracks have since been dismantled. The Stuttgart 21 project involves building new sidings in the Untertürkheim track field.

=== S-Bahn ===
Line	Route
S 1	Kirchheim (Teck) – Wendlingen – Plochingen – Esslingen – Untertürkheim – Neckarpark – Bad Cannstatt – Hauptbahnhof – Schwabstraße – Vaihingen – Rohr – Böblingen – Herrenberg

=== Regional transport ===
Line	Route
RB 11	Stuttgart-Untertürkheim – Stuttgart-Münster – Kornwestheim Pbf

=== Stadtbahn ===
At Karl-Benz-Platz there are two Stadtbahn stations with the name of Untertürkheim station. One is on line U 13 and the other in Wilhelm-Wunder-Steg is the last stop on line U 4.

Line	Route
U4	Untertürkheim – Ostendplatz – Charlottenplatz – Rotebühlplatz – Hölderlinplatz
U13	Giebel – Feuerbach Pfostenwäldle – Pragsattel – Bad Cannstatt – Hedelfingen; In school holidays and outside the peak only between Feuerbach and Hedelfingen.
