= Stuttgart Nürnberger Straße station =

Railway station in Stuttgart, Germany

Nürnberger Straße
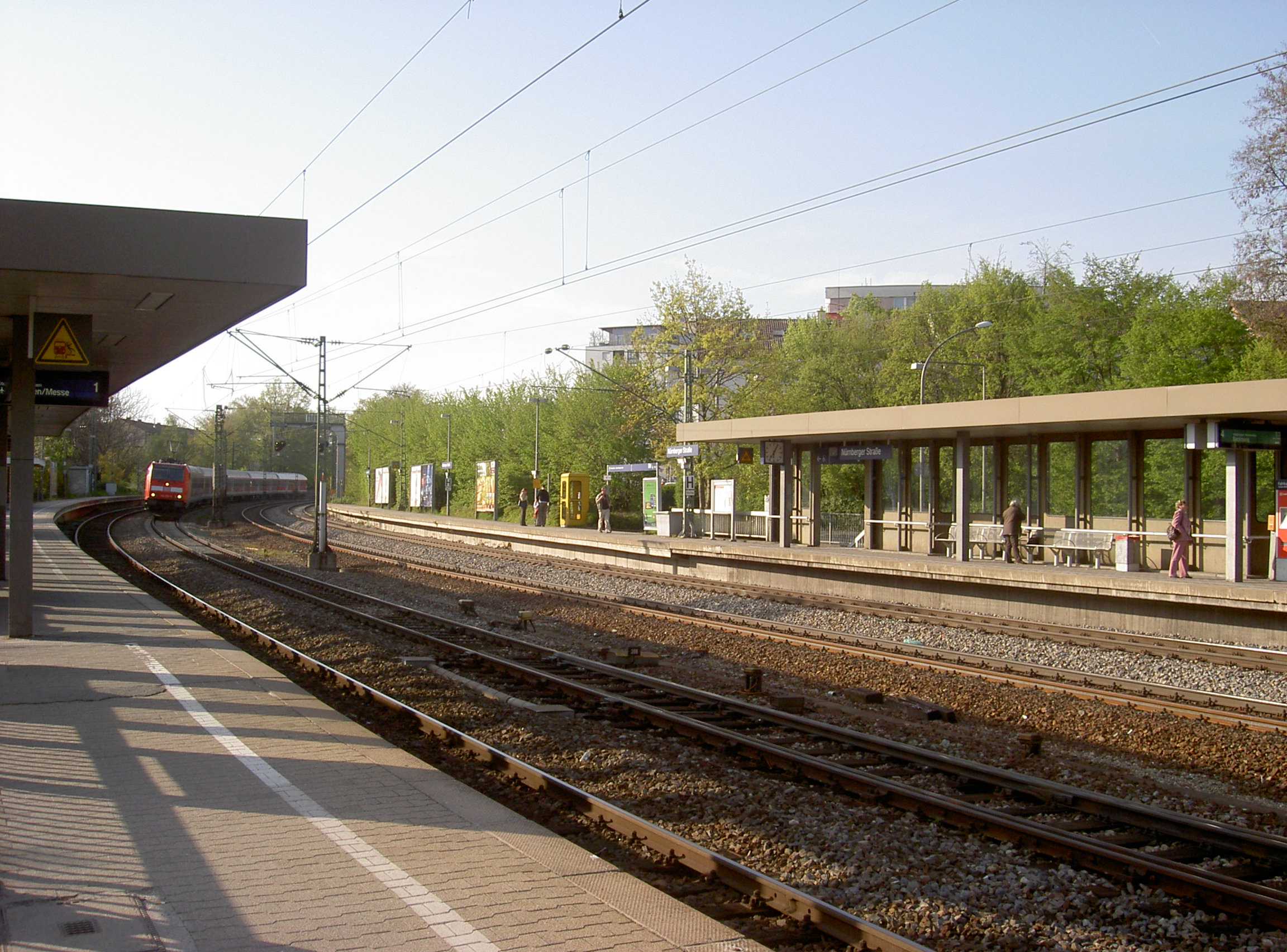

General information
- Location: Nürnberger Strasse, Stuttgart, Baden-Württemberg; Germany
- Coordinates: 48°48′22″N 9°14′5″E
- Owner: Deutsche Bahn
- Operator: DB Netz; DB Station&Service
- Lines: Stuttgart-Bad Cannstatt–Nördlingen railway (KBS 786, KBS 790.2-3); Connection from Stuttgart-Untertürkheim freight yard
- Platforms: 2 side platforms
- Tracks: 4
- Train operators: S-Bahn Stuttgart
- Connections: U1

Construction
- Accessible: Yes

Other information
- Station code: 6074
- DS100 code: TSNU
- IBNR: 08004357
- Category: 5
- Fare zone: : 1
- Website: www.bahnhof.de

History
- Opened: 27 September 1981

Services
Preceding station	Stuttgart S-Bahn	Following station
Bad Cannstatt towards Filderstadt	S2	Sommerrain towards Schorndorf
Bad Cannstatt towards Flughafen/Messe	S3	Sommerrain towards Backnang
Location

Nürnberger Strasse station is located at the 2.7 kilometre point of the Stuttgart-Bad Cannstatt–Nördlingen railway in the German state of Baden-Württemberg and is a station on the Stuttgart S-Bahn network.

== History ==
As early as 1906, there was a proposal for an additional station on the Rems Railway in Cannstatt in the vicinity of the regional hospital. As the track in this area has a slope of 1.4 percent, it was not possible to provide a station for arriving and departing passengers served by the steam locomotives of the time. The parliament of Württemberg rejected the project for this reason.

Cannstatt expanded further east in the late 1920s and into the 1930s. The residential areas of Geiger and Espan had been built along the road to Fellbach, which since 1936 had been called Nürnberger Strasse (Nuremberg Road). Tram line 1 had been extended to Fellbach in 1929, connecting its residents to Stuttgart's public transport system.

Construction, mostly of apartment buildings, continued in the 1950s. In 1957, Stuttgart City Council commissioned traffic engineer Professor Walther Lambert to develop a new transport concept for the city of Stuttgart and the surrounding districts. In May 1962, he presented his result. Lambert saw a need for a new station in Bad Cannstatt. An S-Bahn station should be built in the future at Kienbach junction, where a connecting track to the Untertürkheim freight yard branched off the Rems Railway. He called the proposed station Kienbach station after an old name for the area.

In 1978, construction began in preparation for S-Bahn operations on the Rems Railway. The double-track section between Bad Cannstatt and Waiblingen received an additional pair of tracks. The new Nürnbergerstraße station was built at the crossing of the former federal highway B 14. It was opened with the commissioning of S-Bahn lines S2 and S3 on 27 September 1981. It developed into a new transfer point between the S-Bahn and tram line 1, now Stuttgart Stadtbahn line U 1. The Stadtbahn stop is now also called Nürnberger Strasse.

== Rail operations ==
The station is served by lines S 2 and S 3 of the Stuttgart S-Bahn. Platform track 1 is used by S-Bahn services towards Bad Cannstatt and track 4 is used by services S-Bahn towards Waiblingen. Tracks 2 and 3 are used by trains that do not stop and do not have platforms.

Nürnberger Straße station is classified by Deutsche Bahn as a category 5 station.

=== S-Bahn ===
Line	Route
S 2	Schorndorf – Weinstadt – Waiblingen – Nürnberger Straße – Bad Cannstatt – Hauptbahnhof – Schwabstraße – Vaihingen – Rohr – Stuttgart Flughafen/Messe – Filderstadt (extra trains in the peak between Schorndorf and Vaihingen.)
S 3	Backnang – Winnenden – Waiblingen – Nürnberger Straße – Bad Cannstatt – Hauptbahnhof – Vaihingen – Rohr – Flughafen/Messe (extra trains in the peak between Backnang and Vaihingen).

=== Stadtbahn ===
Nürnberger Straße is also a stop on Stadtbahn line U 1.

Line	Route (1435 mm gauge)
U1	Fellbach Lutherkirche – Nürnberger Straße – Bad Cannstatt – Charlottenplatz – Heslach – Vaihingen
