= Prag Tunnel =

Coordinates: 48°48′35″N 9°10′34″E

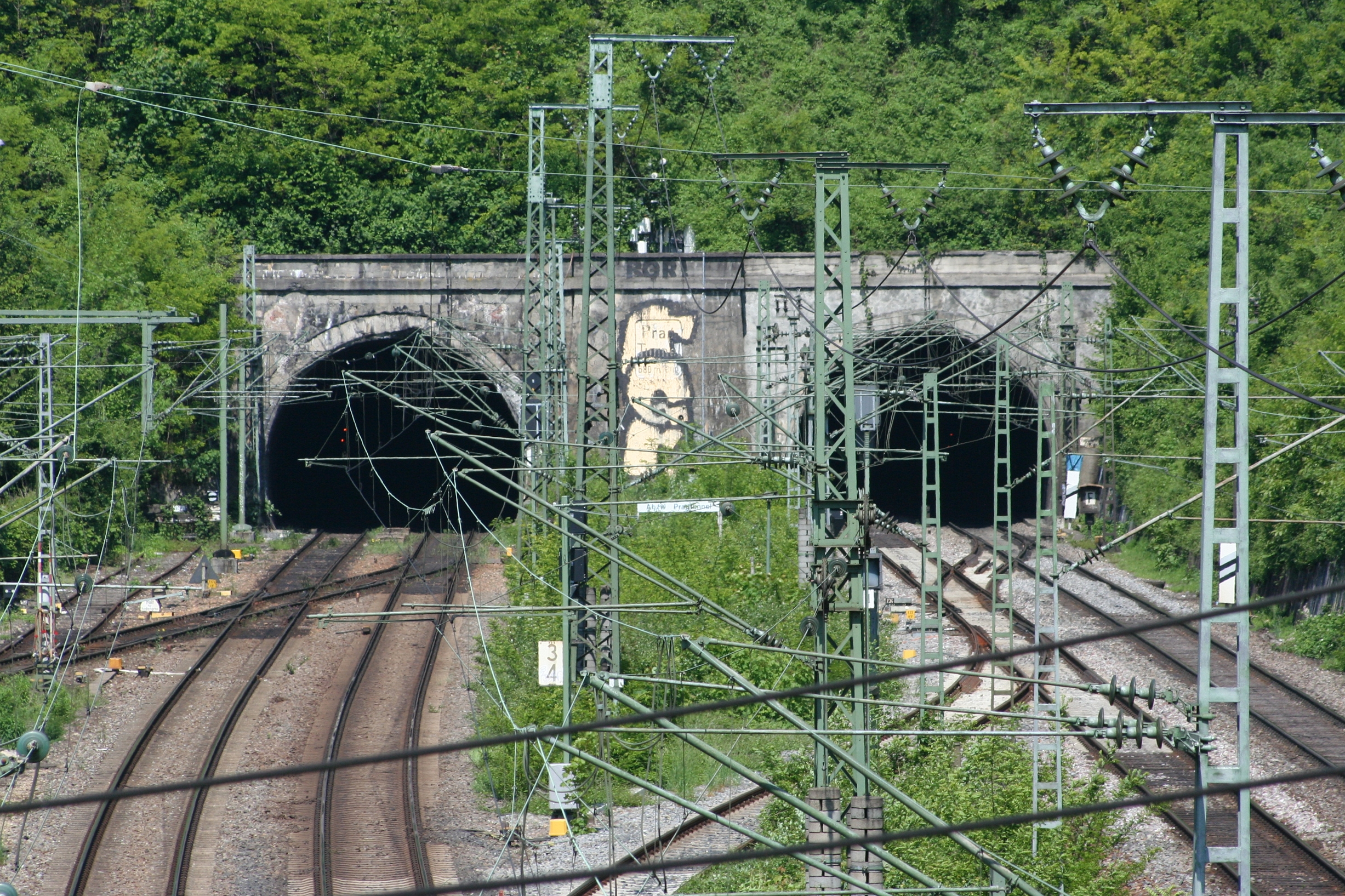
Southern portals of the Prag Tunnels

The Prag Tunnel is a railway tunnel in the German city of Stuttgart under the Prag, a ridge between the Stuttgart basin and Feuerbach. The two 680 metre-long bores of the tunnel connect Stuttgart North station with Feuerbach station. Trains from Stuttgart run through the tunnel towards Karlsruhe, Mannheim and Heilbronn on the Franconia Railway and the Mannheim–Stuttgart high-speed railway and towards Ludwigsburg and Leonberg on the Stuttgart S-Bahn.

The tunnel runs in layers of Gipskeuper rock, containing anhydrite, which swell strongly when in contact with water. The track centres in the two tubes are 3.70 and 4.00 m apart.

== History ==
The first tube of the Prag tunnel was built as part of the first railway in Württemberg, the Württemberg Central Railway between Esslingen, Stuttgart and Ludwigsburg. The first sod was turned on 26 June 1844 and marked the start of the construction of the Central Railway. Five shafts were sunk to enable the construction of the tunnel running through the Keuper layers; these were later filled in again. During a tunnel collapse 20 workers lost their lives.

The 828.65 metre-long tunnel finally broke through after two years of construction and operations began on the Central Line on 15 October 1846. The tunnel was designed from the start for two-track operations, but it initially only had a single track. The second track was built between 1858 and 1861.

Between 1911 and 1914, the tube that is now used by the S-Bahn was shortened to 680 m in order to build the freight rail link between the Gäu Railway (Gäubahn) and Stuttgart North Station.

=== Second tube ===
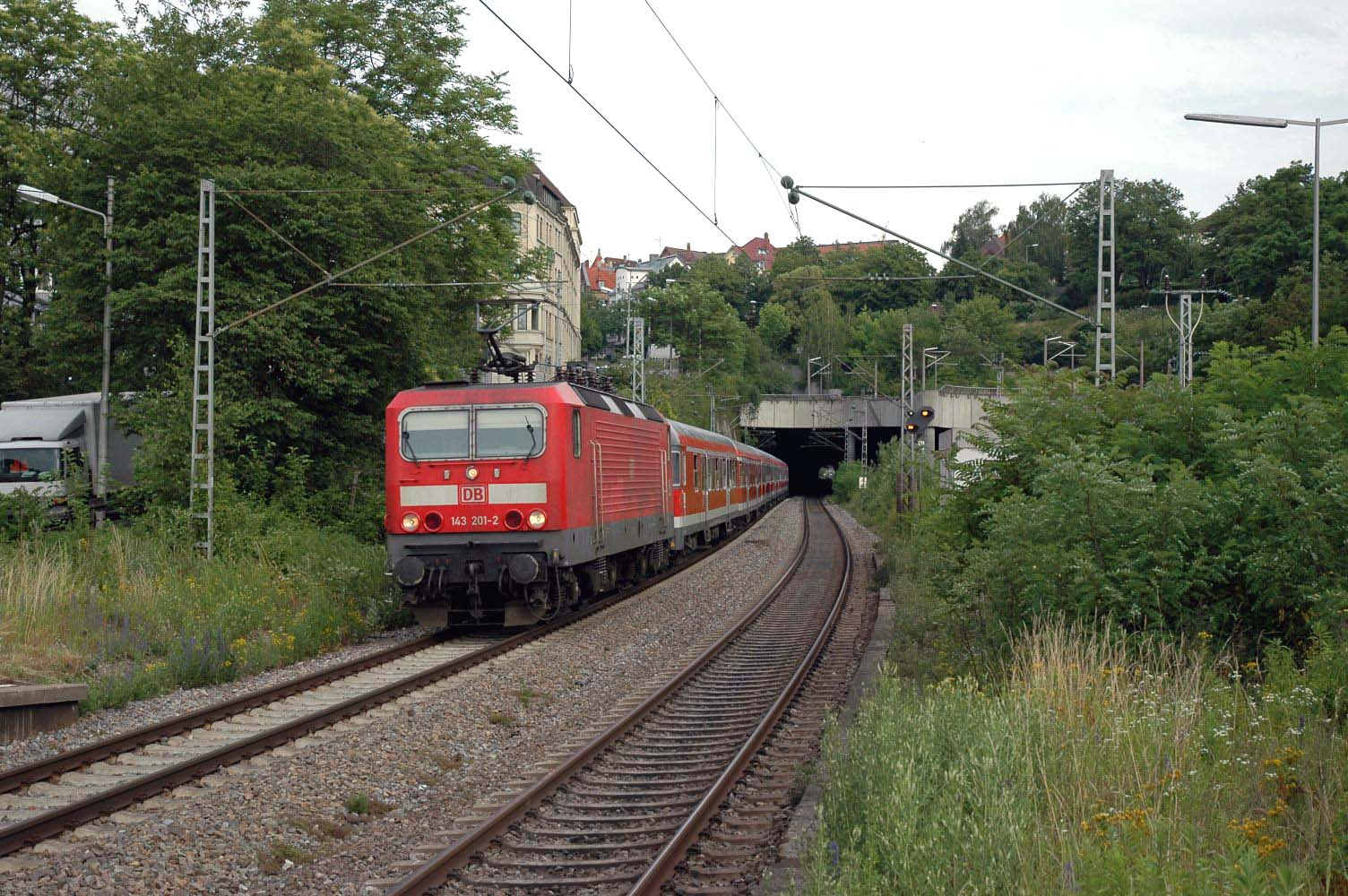
A Regionalbahn train leaving the long-distance tunnel towards the north (June 2006)

In 1907, it was decided to carry out extensive restructuring on the Stuttgart railway facilities, including upgrading the Stuttgart-Ludwigsburg line to four-tracks. From October 1908 a second, 680-metre long tunnel was built just to the northeast of the first, which accommodated two additional tracks.

The tunnel broke through on 22 June 1909, but shortly afterwards it sank over a length of 20 to 30 metres and the ground above the tunnel sunk by up to four metres. After repairing the damage, it took until August 1910 to put the new tunnel into operations. Subsequently, the old tunnel, which had probably become unstable due to the construction of the new tunnel was initially blocked and it was then renovated. On this occasion, the tunnel was shortened by additional excavations on the Stuttgart side to give it a length of 680 metres as well. The renovation was completed on 21 August 1912 and, on 21–22 November 1912, the old bore was put back into service. Since then it has been used by suburban services (now part of the S-Bahn), while the new bore has been used by long-distance trains.

Since 1981, a Stuttgart Stadtbahn (light rail) overpass has been located near the northern portals of both tubes. In this structure provision was made for the construction of a then planned additional freight track west of the S-Bahn tracks. This would have involved a third bore for the Prag Tunnel.

== Future use / Stuttgart 21 ==
After the commissioning of the Stuttgart 21 project, the bore of the Prag Tunnel that is now used for long-distance and regional train will no longer be used for this traffic. These trains will in future be routed directly through the Feuerbach Tunnel from Feuerbach station to Stuttgart Central Station (Hauptbahnhof).

Both of the old bores are to remain. The bore serving the S-Bahn network are to continue to be used by the S-Bahn. The long distance bore is also to be maintained and will be available in future to supply two additional tracks under the so-called P option of the Stuttgart 21 project.

In the course of the development of the Stuttgart 21 project the North Cross (Nordkreuz) option was developed including a third two-track tunnel to be built for the S-Bahn tracks towards Stuttgart Nord station (deep level) and Stuttgart Central Station (deep level).
