= Stuttgart Neckarpark station =

Railway station in Stuttgart, Germany

Stuttgart Neckarpark
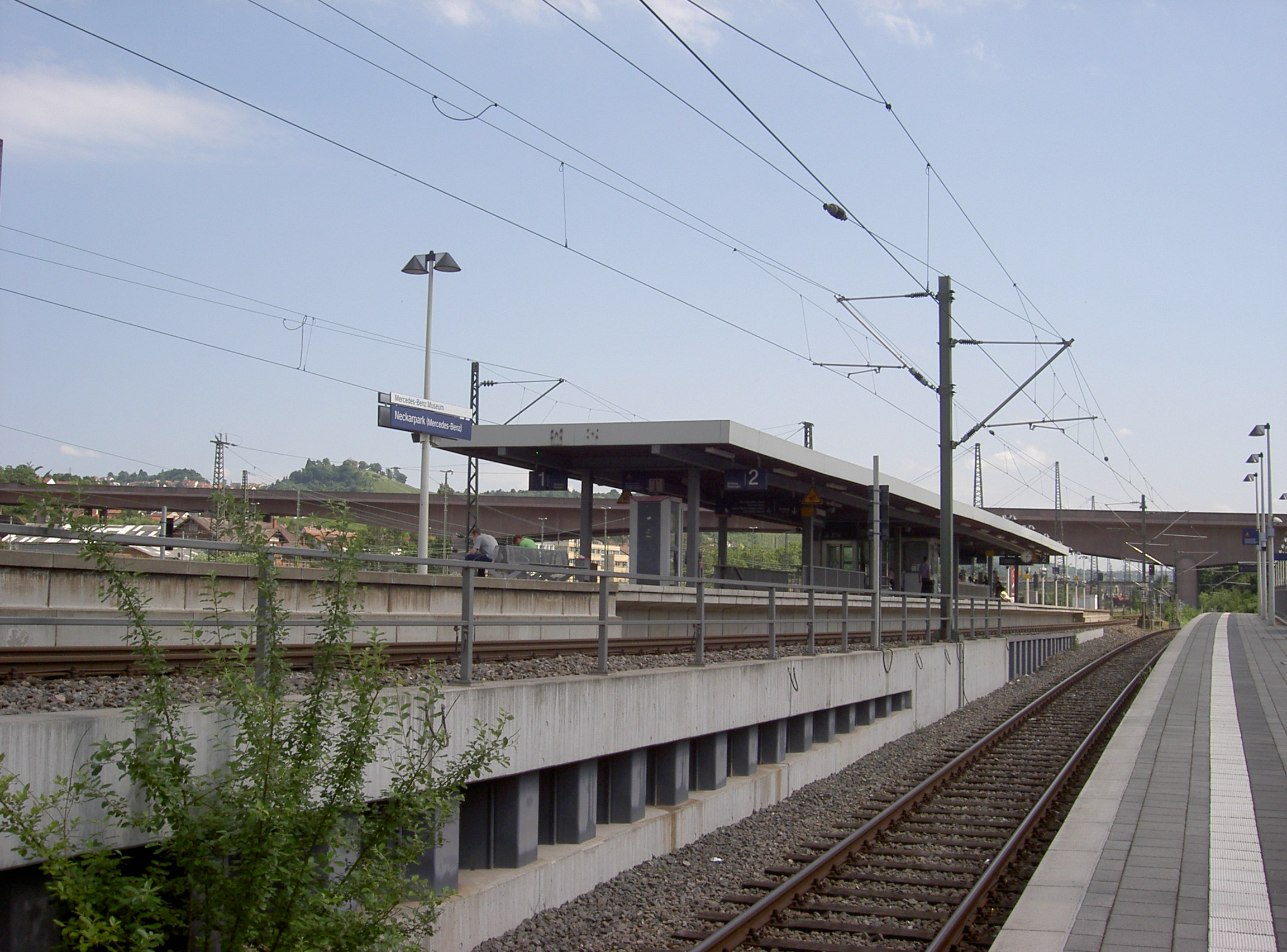

General information
- Location: Alte Untertürkheimer Strasse; Stuttgart, Baden-Württemberg; Germany
- Coordinates: 48°47′30″N 9°14′28″E
- Lines: Fils Valley Railway (KBS 750, KBS 790.1)
- Platforms: 3

Construction
- Accessible: Yes

Other information
- Station code: 6072
- DS100 code: TSNS
- IBNR: 8006743
- Category: 4
- Fare zone: : 1
- Website: www.bahnhof.de

History
- Opened: 29 September 1984
- Former names: Neckarstadion; Gottlieb-Daimler-Stadion; Neckarpark (Mercedes-Benz)

Services
Preceding station	Stuttgart S-Bahn	Following station
Stuttgart-Bad Cannstatt towards Herrenberg	S1	Stuttgart-Untertürkheim towards Kirchheim (Teck)
Location

Stuttgart Neckarpark station is in the German city of Stuttgart and is located at the chainage of 5.6 kilometres (measured from Stuttgart Hauptbahnhof) on the Fils Valley Railway and is a station on the network of the Stuttgart S-Bahn.

== History ==
The Cannstatter Wasen ("Cannstatt grass") has been a fairground and exhibition area since the 19th century. In 1928 the city of Stuttgart exchanged land on the Wasen owned by the State of Wurttemberg with land in the district of Burgholzhof in northwestern Bad Cannstatt. It intended to create a major new stadium on the site, which served as a training ground among other things. The link to the new sports facility proved to be a problem, because neither Cannstatt station nor Untertürkheim station were close enough for visitors.

Karl Schaechterle of the Railway Administration of Stuttgart (German: Reichsbahndirektion Stuttgart) planned a new station for special trains on the Fils Valley line, the Wasen station. In addition to the suburban platforms on the Fils Valley tracks, a platform would also be built on the long-distance tracks. A low platform would be built for trains running on the Schuster Railway (Schusterbahn) from Kornwestheim. Trains coming from Waiblingen would run on the Rems Railway curve towards Untertürkheim freight yard to reach the station. Another platform was later located there to provide for commuting to Stuttgart Hauptbahnhof (central station). Schaechterle could not implement his plan, however, as the Deutsche Reichsbahn rejected it.

Deutsche Bundesbahn drew up fresh plans for a station at Neckarstadion (Neckar Stadium) in the 1960s. Since planning for the Stuttgart S-Bahn was already under consideration, providing a stop for long-distance trains on the Fils Valley railway was not envisaged.

Since 1978, S-Bahn line S 1 services have run between Schwabstraße and Plochingen. The possibility of a building a new S-Bahn station near the stadium was considered. Studies conducted in 1979 by transport planners found a positive result for the proposal. The way was now clear for the establishment of Neckarstadion station on Alten Untertürkheimer Straße (street) and it was inaugurated on 29 September 1984.

In addition to the Neckarstadion, the station was near the Hanns-Martin-Schleyer-Halle (indoor arena) and the Daimler-Benz plant at Untertürkheim.

After the Neckarstadion was renamed, the station was renamed Gottlieb-Daimler-Stadion station. To handle the many visitors at major events, the station has had another track and a lift since July 2005.

The opening of the Mercedes-Benz Museum in May 2006 increased the importance of the station. A sign reading "Mercedes-Benz Museum" was added to the station sign. In 2008, the Gottlieb-Daimler-Stadion was renamed Mercedes-Benz Arena. It was decided to rename the station with its current name, not only to refer to the stadium, but to the entire events area. To distinguish it from the Stuttgart Stadtbahn station of Neckarpark (Stadion), the S-Bahn station was named Neckarpark (Mercedes-Benz) in 2008, but the advertising contract with Mercedes-Benz expired on 1 August 2014 and was not renewed, so it is now again called Stuttgart Neckarpark.

== Operations ==
The station is on line S 1 of the Stuttgart S-Bahn. Platform track 1 is used by the S-Bahn services to Bad Cannstatt. Track 2 is used by S-Bahn services to Esslingen. Track 3 is used by special services only. The station is classified by Deutsche Bahn as a category 4 station.

=== S-Bahn ===
Line	Route
S 1	Kirchheim (Teck) – Wendlingen – Plochingen – Esslingen – Neckarpark – Bad Cannstatt – Hauptbahnhof – Schwabstraße – Vaihingen – Rohr – Böblingen – Herrenberg
