= Stuttgart-Bad Cannstatt station =

Second largest station in Stuttgart

Stuttgart Bad Cannstatt
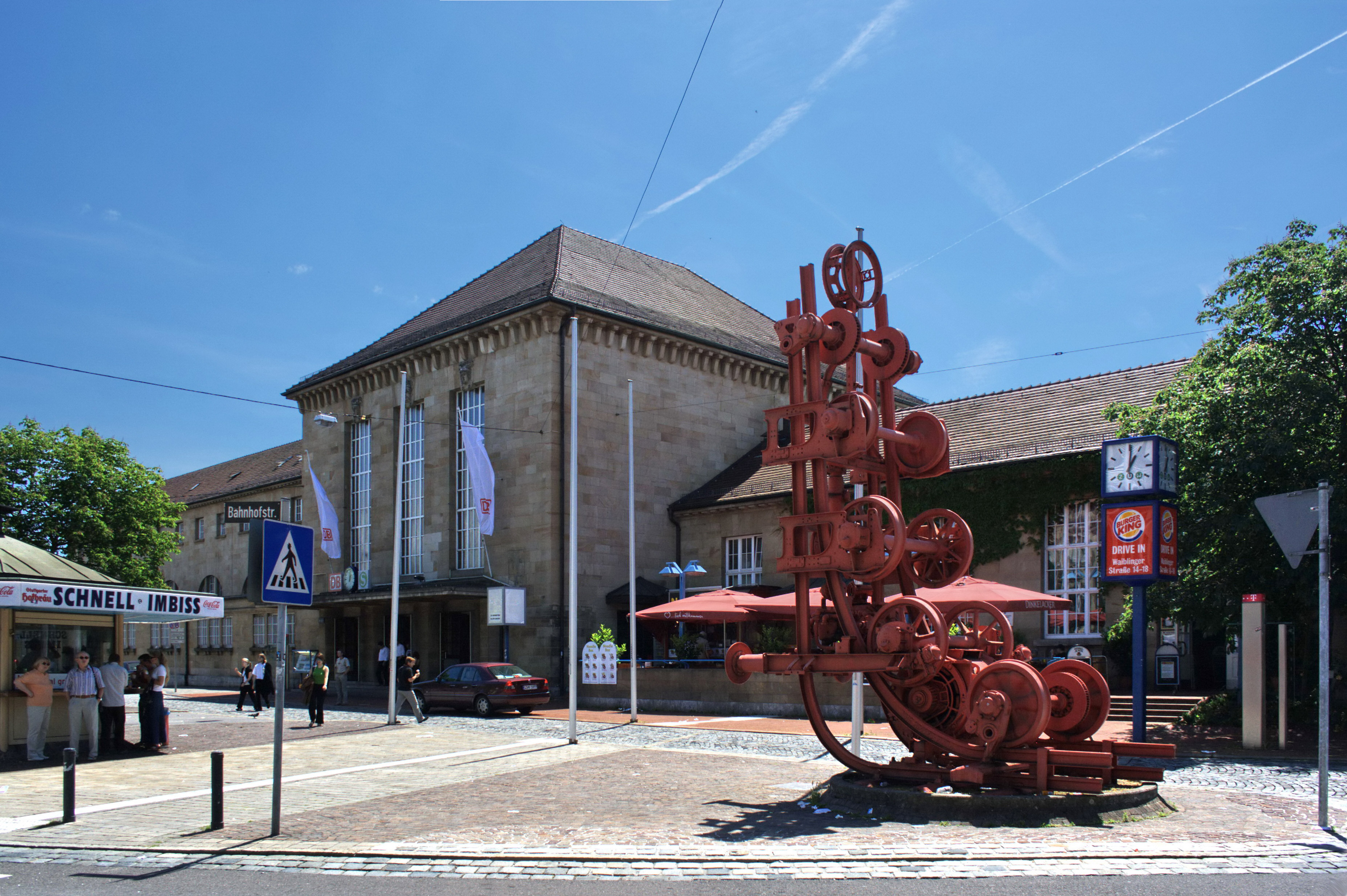

General information
- Location: Bahnhofstr. 30, Stuttgart, BW; Germany
- Coordinates: 48°48′6″N 9°13′4″E
- Owner: Deutsche Bahn
- Operator: DB Netz; DB Station&Service
- Lines: Fils Valley Railway (KBS 750, KBS 790.1); Bad Cannstatt–Nördlingen (KBS 786, KBS 790.2-3); Access line to Stuttgart-Untertürkheim freight yard
- Platforms: 8

Construction
- Accessible: Yes
- Architect: Michael Knoll (1845); Martin Meyer (1915)
- Architectural style: Rundbogenstil (1845)

Other information
- Station code: 6077
- DS100 code: TSC
- IBNR: 8005769
- Category: 3
- Fare zone: : 1
- Website: www.bahnhof.de

History
- Opened: 22 October 1845

Passengers
- 36,572 per day (2005)

Services
Preceding station		Following station
Stuttgart Hbf Terminus	RE 90	Waiblingen towards Nürnberg Hbf
Stuttgart Hbf Terminus	MEX 13	Waiblingen towards Crailsheim
Stuttgart Hbf Terminus	MEX 16	Esslingen (Neckar) towards Ulm Hbf
Preceding station	DB Regio Baden-Württemberg	Following station
Stuttgart Hbf Terminus	MEX 19	Waiblingen towards Schwäbisch Hall-Hessental or Crailsheim
Stuttgart Hbf Terminus	MEX 90	Waiblingen towards Schwäbisch Hall-Hessental
Preceding station	(Stuttgart)	Following station
Esslingen (Neckar) towards Tübingen Hbf	MEX 12	Stuttgart Hbf towards Mosbach-Neckarelz
Stuttgart-Untertürkheim towards Tübingen Hbf	MEX 18	Stuttgart Hbf towards Osterburken
Preceding station	Stuttgart S-Bahn	Following station
Hauptbahnhof towards Herrenberg	S1	Neckarpark towards Kirchheim (Teck)
Hauptbahnhof towards Filderstadt	S2	Nürnberger Straße towards Schorndorf
Hauptbahnhof towards Flughafen/Messe	S3	Nürnberger Straße towards Backnang
Location

Bad Cannstatt station is the second largest station of the German city of Stuttgart after Stuttgart Hauptbahnhof and has eight platform tracks. Together with Untertürkheim station, it is the oldest station in Württemberg.

== History ==
During the planning of the original railway in Württemberg, the Württemberg Central Railway (German: Württembergische Centralbahn), it was proposed to provide a station for the city of Cannstatt with its 5,500 inhabitants. The original proposal for the line consisted of a connection between the proposed Stuttgart Central Station to Cannstatt, where it would branch towards Esslingen and Ludwigsburg. Because of Stuttgart's geographical location, the route via Cannstatt was the only feasible route for a railway with the technology of the time.

On 5 October 1845, the first railway in Württemberg was opened from Cannstatt to Untertürkheim. Following the completion of the Rosenstein Tunnel on 4 July 1846, the first train ran into Stuttgart station on 26 September 1846.

With increasing traffic, Cannstatt needed a new station. The old district town and spa of Cannstatt and Stuttgart had grown together. The current station building was built during the First World War.

Originally there were magnificent hotels for the many guests of the spa. A plastic sculpture, called Schienenhaufen (rail piles) by Karl-Heinz Franke, was installed in the forecourt in 1985, commemorating the opening of the first railway in Württemberg 140 years earlier.

A comprehensive modernisation of the station was completed for the 2006 FIFA World Cup in May 2006, after 20 months of work. Lifts were installed to provide barrier-free access to the platforms and the platform paving was renewed, while the listed platform canopies were preserved. The underpass running under the station was rebuilt with granite and the forecourt to the south facing the Cannstatter Wasen was refurbished. The costs were around €6 million to Deutsche Bahn, with additional funds from the state's Municipal Transport Financing Act (Gemeindeverkehrsfinanzierungsgesetz), the City of Stuttgart and the Stuttgart Region.

=== Prospects ===
In the course of the Stuttgart 21 rail project, various modifications to the station are planned. The tracks at the western end of the station will be replaced by new lines being built as part of the project. Platforms 2 (tracks 2 and 3) and 3 (tracks 4 and 5) will be shortened, and according to DB information will no longer be used.

== Entrance building ==
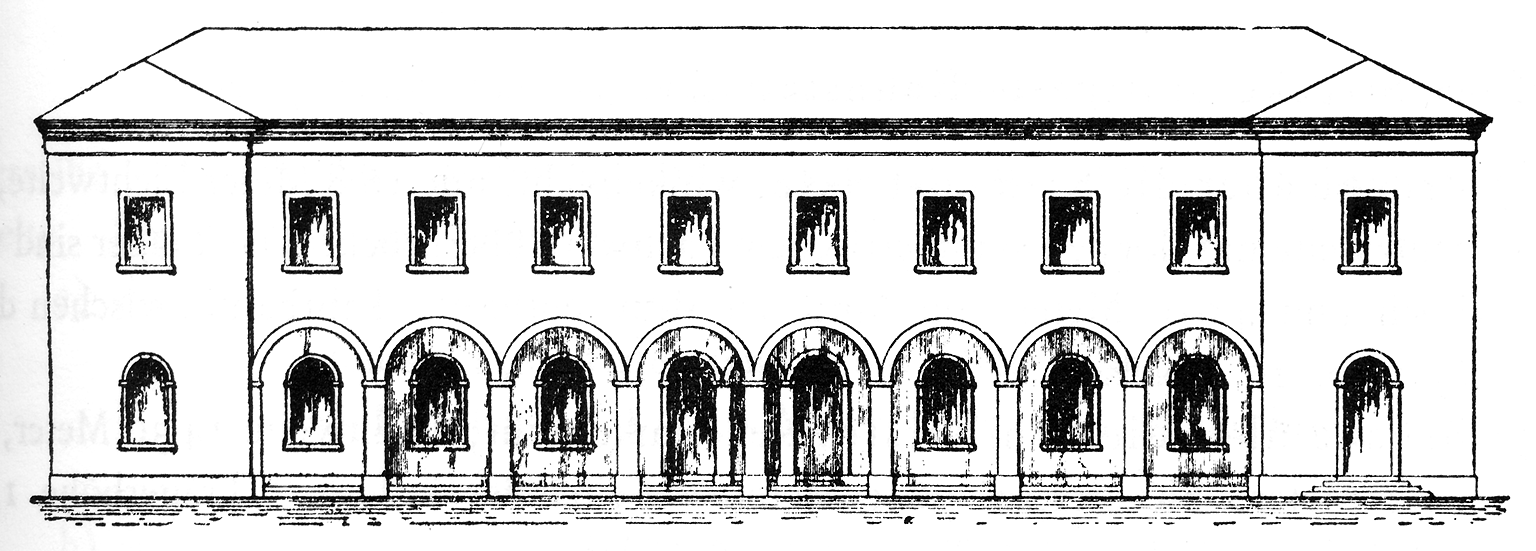
First entrance building of 1845

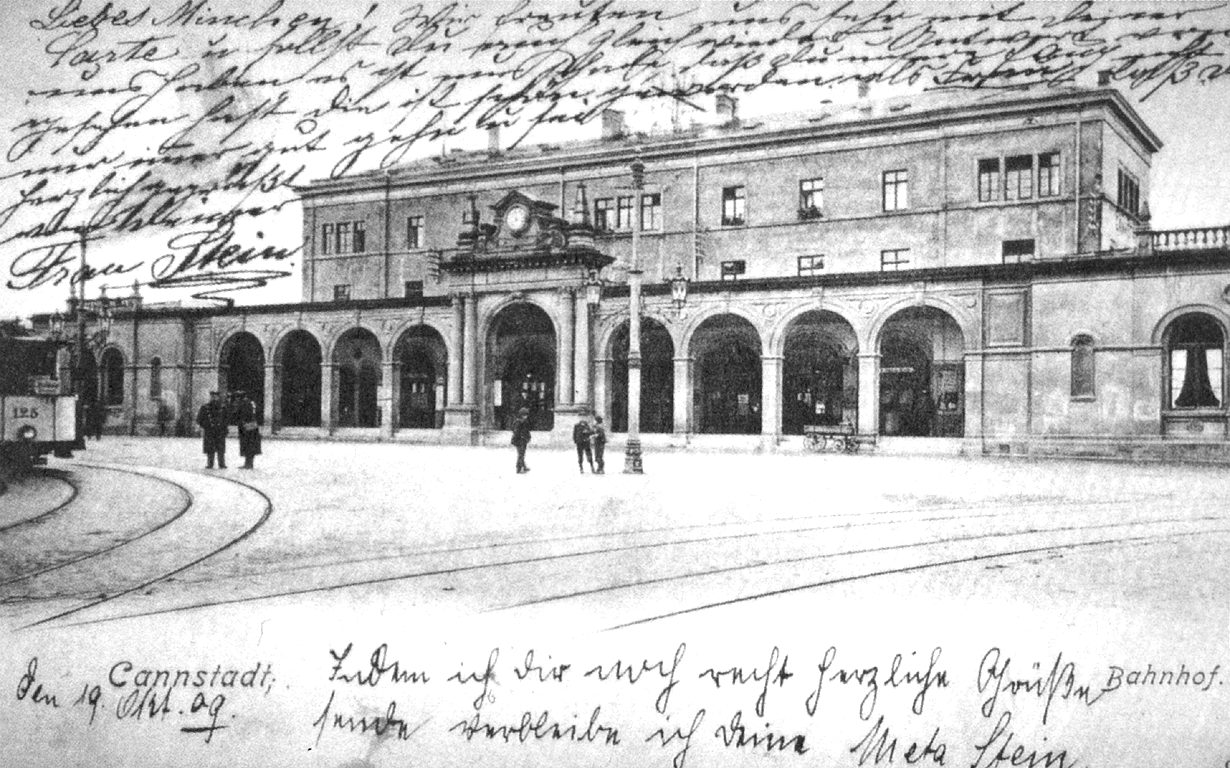
First entrance building after the extensions of 1863 and 1886 (postcard from ca. 1900)

The first station building in Cannstatt was probably designed by Michael Knoll, who developed Karl Etzel's plans for the First Stuttgart Central Station (Stuttgarter Centralbahnhof). The construction of the two-story, small building commenced in 1844 parallel with the Stuttgart station. The extremely simple, narrow building in Cannstatt had ten parallel axes and a side projection. In it, on the ground floor, were the office of the station manager, two waiting rooms, the cash room and a luggage room. On the first floor were living rooms and a conference room. Close to the station building there was a turntable. A carriage and an engine shed were arranged to the left and the right symmetrically. There was also the beginning of a freight shed.

The obligation to save money and the resulting small size of the buildings soon led to problems. The crowded station buildings in Cannstatt and Ludwigsburg were noted by the director of the Württemberg railway in 1849. In 1860 two stories added to the city side of the station building and by 1886 an arcaded porch was added.

Martin Meyer designed a new station that was completed in 1915, including an entrance building with three wings. The raised middle section is covered with a hipped roof. The main facade is divided symmetrically. Three tall windows brighten the lobby. A two-storey wing extends to the left and a one-storey wing extends to the right of the central building. The station administration is housed at the higher level of the left wing with its round windows. Also care was taken to build functionally and not in the neoclassical or Art Nouveau styles. The main entrance is decorated with the figures of Zeus, Hermes and Athena.

== Current operations ==
Bad Cannstatt station is a railway junction, where traffic from Stuttgart Hauptbahnhof on the Fils Valley Railway separates from the Rems and the Murr Railways. Here tracks 1 to 4 are used for regional traffic and tracks 5-8 are used for long-distance traffic. The tracks to and from Waiblingen run in each case between the tracks to and from Esslingen, the tracks are disentangled east of the station. Nowadays tracks 2 and 3 are used only by the S-Bahn, the other tracks are used by regional services.

Bad Cannstatt station is classified by Deutsche Bahn as a category 3 station.

=== Regional services ===
Line		Frequency
MEX 12	Heilbronn – Stuttgart – Bad Cannstatt – Esslingen – Plochingen – Nürtingen – Metzingen – Reutlingen – Tübingen	60 mins
MEX 13	Stuttgart – Bad Cannstatt – Waiblingen – Schorndorf – Schwäbisch Gmünd – Aalen (– Ellwangen – Crailsheim)	30 mins (60 mins to Ellwangen, 120 mins to Crailsheim)
MEX 16	Stuttgart – Bad Cannstatt – Esslingen – Plochingen – Göppingen – Geislingen (Steige) (– Ulm)	30 mins, 60 mins to Ulm
MEX 18	Osterburken – Heilbronn – Stuttgart – Bad Cannstatt – Esslingen – Plochingen – Wendlingen – Nürtingen – Metzingen (Württ) – Reutlingen – Tübingen	60 mins
MEX 19	Stuttgart – Bad Cannstatt – Waiblingen – Backnang – Gaildorf West (– Schwäbisch Hall-Hessental – Crailsheim)	60 mins (Mon–Fri only, afternoons to Schwäbisch Hall, some trains to Crailsheim)
MEX 90	Stuttgart – Bad Cannstatt – Waiblingen – Backnang – Gaildorf West – Schwäbisch Hall-Hessental (– Crailsheim)	120 mins (in the peak to Crailsheim)
RE 90	Stuttgart – Bad Cannstatt – Waiblingen – Backnang – Schwäbisch Hall-Hessental – Crailsheim – Ansbach – Nuremberg	120 mins

=== S-Bahn ===
Line	Route
S 1	Kirchheim (Teck) – Wendlingen – Plochingen – Esslingen – Neckarpark – Bad Cannstatt – Hauptbahnhof – Schwabstraße – Vaihingen – Rohr – Böblingen – Herrenberg (additional services in peaks between Esslingen and Schwabstraße as well as Böblingen.)
S 2	Schorndorf – Weinstadt – Waiblingen – Bad Cannstatt – Hauptbahnhof – Schwabstraße – Vaihingen – Rohr – Flughafen/Messe – Filderstadt (additional services in peaks between Schorndorf and Vaihingen.)
S 3	Backnang – Winnenden – Waiblingen – Bad Cannstatt – Hauptbahnhof – Schwabstraße – Vaihingen – Rohr – Flughafen/Messe (Since the opening of the new Messe, late night services on weekends to Flughafen (Airport)/Messe operate from Vaihingen; additional services in peaks between Backnang and Vaihingen.)

=== Stadtbahn ===
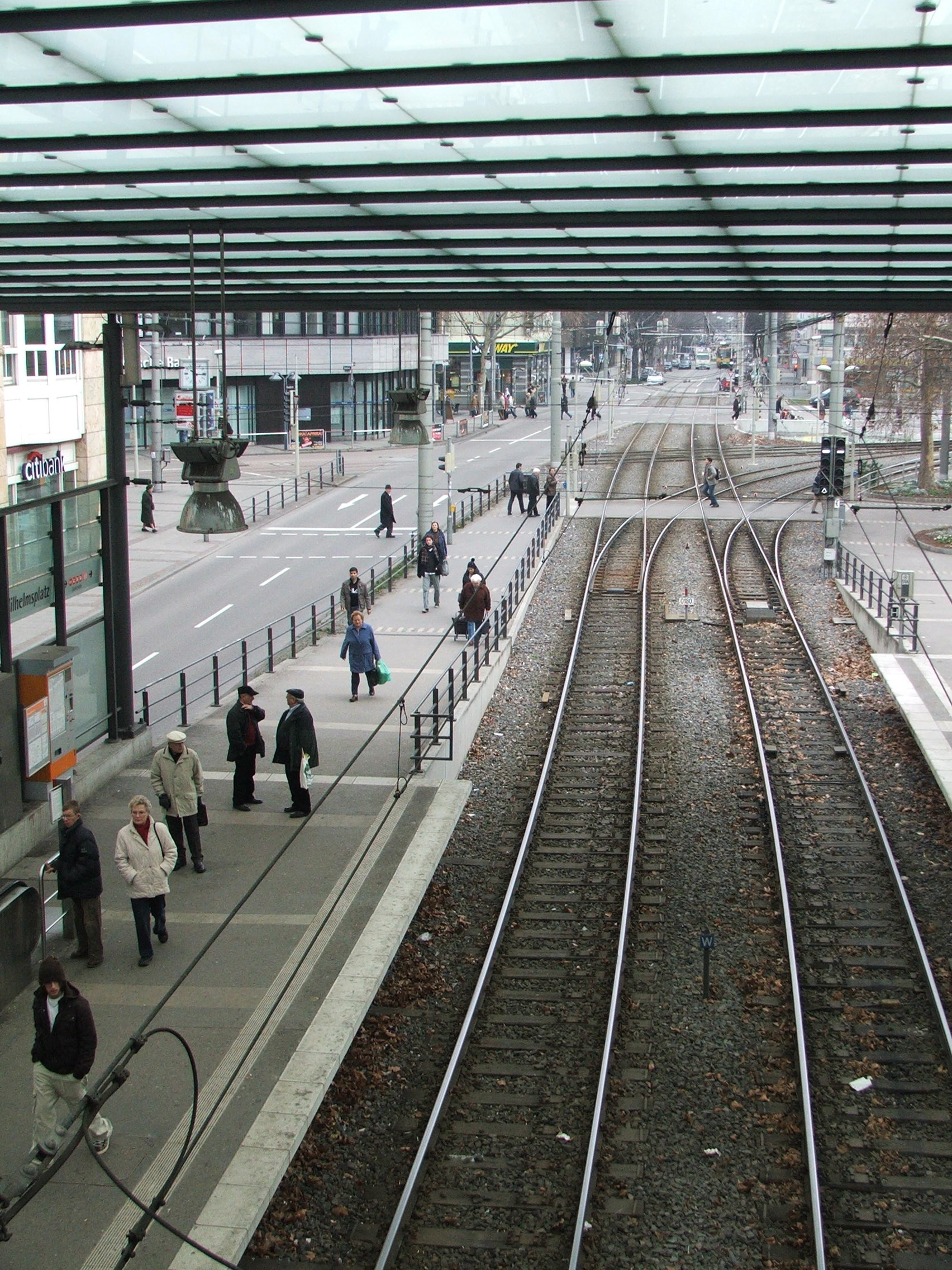
Wilhelmsplatz Stadtbahn station

The station has no direct links to the Stuttgart Stadtbahn. However, it is only 200 metres from the station on Wilhelmsplatz station on the following lines:

Line	Route
U1	Fellbach Lutherkirche – Bad Cannstatt Wilhelmsplatz – Charlottenplatz – Heslach – Vaihingen
U2	Neugereut – Bad Cannstatt Wilhelmsplatz – Charlottenplatz – Botnang
U13	(Giebel –) Feuerbach Pfostenwäldle – Pragsattel – Bad Cannstatt (Wilhelmsplatz) – Hedelfingen; In school holidays and outside the peak only between Feuerbach and Hedelfingen.
U19	Bad Cannstatt Wilhelmsplatz – Neckarpark (Stadium); Only for events at Neckarpark (MHPArena, Schleyer-Halle, Porsche Arena, Carl Benz Center).
