= Kornwestheim station =

Railway station in Kornwestheim, Germany

Kornwestheim Pbf
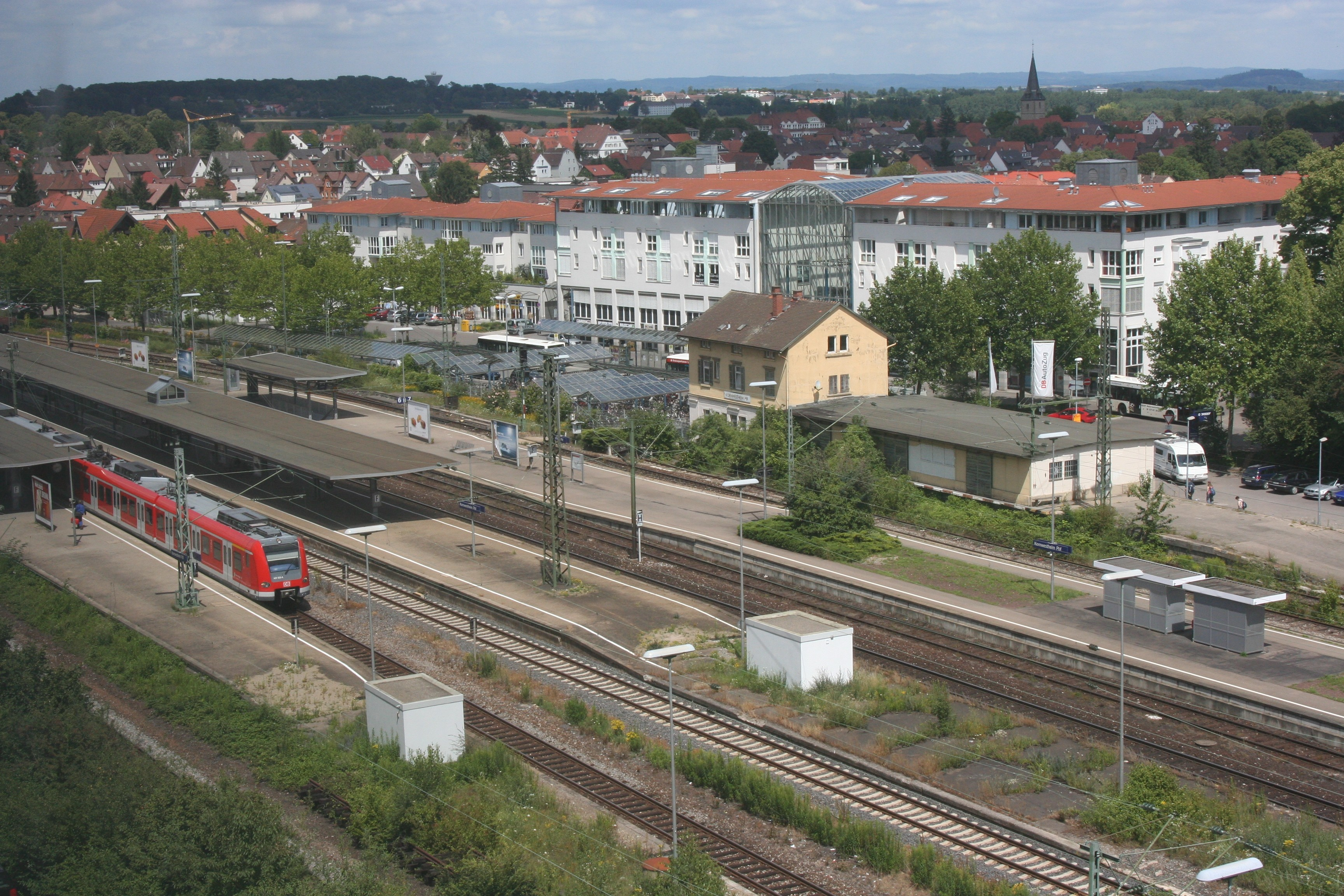

General information
- Location: Bahnhofstraße 85, Kornwestheim, Baden-Württemberg; Germany
- Coordinates: 48°51′44″N 9°10′48″E
- Owner: Deutsche Bahn
- Operator: DB Netz; DB Station&Service
- Lines: Franconia Railway (KBS 780, KBS 790.4-5); Schuster Railway (KBS 790.11)
- Platforms: 7 (3 in regular use)

Construction
- Accessible: Yes (except platform 7)

Other information
- Station code: 3379
- DS100 code: TKH
- IBNR: 8003411
- Category: 3
- Fare zone: : 2
- Website: www.bahnhof.de

History
- Opened: 15 October 1846; 179 years ago
- Electrified: 1 June 1933; 93 years ago

Services
Preceding station	DB Regio Baden-Württemberg	Following station
Terminus	RB 11	Stuttgart-Zazenhausen towards Stuttgart-Untertürkheim
Preceding station	Stuttgart S-Bahn	Following station
Zuffenhausen towards Schwabstraße	S4	Ludwigsburg towards Backnang
Zuffenhausen towards Schwabstraße	S5	Ludwigsburg towards Bietigheim-Bissingen
Location

Kornwestheim station is located in the Ludwigsburg district of Kornwestheim in the German state of Baden-Württemberg. It is located on the Franconia Railway (German: Frankenbahn) and is a station on the network of the Stuttgart S-Bahn. It is near the junction of the Untertürkheim–Kornwestheim line (Schusterbahn) freight bypass. Kornwestheim passenger station was the site of a Deutsche Bahn car train loading facility until December 2007.

== History ==
With the establishment of the Central Railway (Zentralbahn) of Württemberg from Stuttgart to Ludwigsburg Kornwestheim also received a station. On 15 October 1846, the station was opened about a kilometre away from the village it served. At first passengers used the Seegasse (roughly today's Bahnhofstraße and Güterbahnhofstraße) to reach the station.

Initially it had a one-storey station building, but another floor was added later. On the ground floor there was a waiting room and an area for providing services. Upstairs was the home of the station master, who was also in charge of the community's postal services until 1891.

In 1852, the Northern Railway between Stuttgart and Bietigheim was duplicated, as traffic in the region of the station increased towards Stuttgart. Because of the increasing freight traffic a freight shed was completed at the station in 1865.

=== First marshalling yard at Kornwestheim ===
To relieve the Stuttgart Central Station (Zentralbahnhof), the Royal Württemberg State Railways (Königlich Württembergischen Staats-Eisenbahnen) planned a freight bypass that provided a direct link between the Eastern and Northern Railways, the Untertürkheim–Kornwestheim line. Two marshalling yards were provided at each end of the line. The terrain at the Zuffenhausen end was unsuitable, but the flat ground in Kornwestheim proved to be ideal.

The first yard was 1,700 metres long and had 15 tracks. The old station building was demolished and rebuilt a few metres further east, where it still remains. At that time, it served as an office for the dispatch of freight and as accommodation for railway staff. A new brick entrance building was built on the west side for rail administration and for the handling of passengers, because most waiting rail passengers were bound for Stuttgart. Two new residential blocks were also built on the west side for rail workers. A locomotive shed and a military loading ramp for the Ludwigsburg regiments were built on the eastern track field.

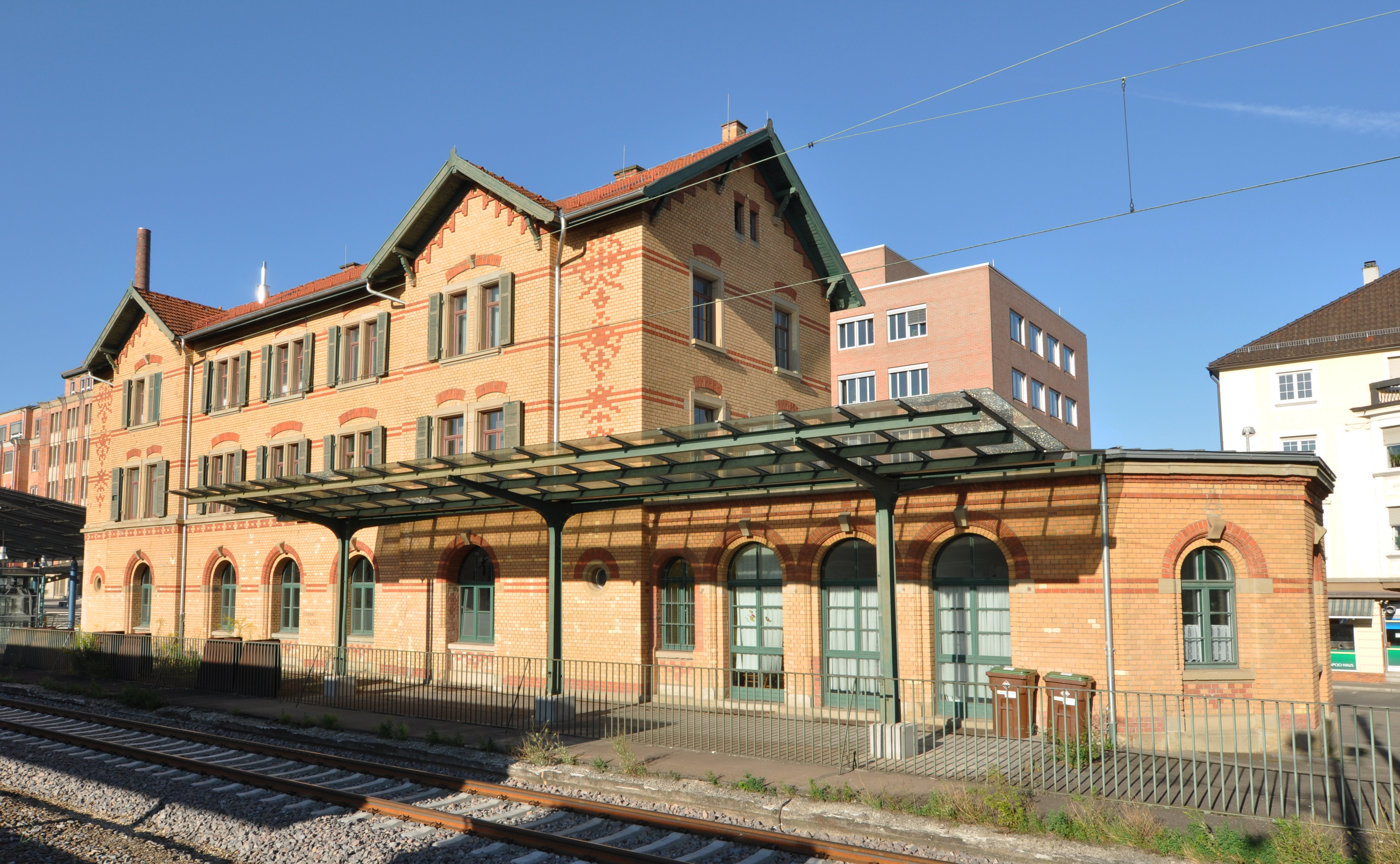
Former entrance building on the west side

The inauguration of the Untertürkheim–Kornwestheim line and the enlarged station was held on 30 September 1896. Even King William II of Württemberg attended the opening ceremony. The townscape of the community gradually changed as the influx of many railway workers and other workers increased the population.

The yard was soon overloaded. In 1907, the state railway considered enlarging the yard, but it found that the construction of a new yard elsewhere was required. As a result, the new Kornwestheim marshalling yard was opened on 29 July 1918. In the future, the two stations were distinguished by the suffixed abbreviations Rbf (Rangierbahnhof, marshalling yard) and Pbf (Personenbahnhof, passenger station).

=== Deutsche Reichsbahn ===
In 1929, Deutsche Reichsbahn completed the upgrade to four tracks between Post 12 (south of Kornwestheim station) and Ludwigsburg. With the electrification of the Northern Railway between Stuttgart and Ludwigsburg, Kornwestheim received its first Stuttgart suburban service on 15 May 1933. In 1935, Mayor Kercher called for a new entrance building, as Kornwestheim had recently been proclaimed a city. This would have been on the east side of the tracks, but nothing came of this proposal.

=== Deutsche Bundesbahn period ===
In the 1960s, the volume of motorail services was increasing. Therefore, Deutsche Bundesbahn decided to build a car loading dock. The first motorail services ran in 1962 between Kornwestheim and Villach.

The new station building was inaugurated on 10 October 1992. It houses shops, offices and apartments. It consists of two five-storey buildings, built perpendicularly, which were painted white. Especially impressive is the large glass roof that connects the buildings. There is an eastern entrance to the subway connecting the platforms.

== Rail services ==
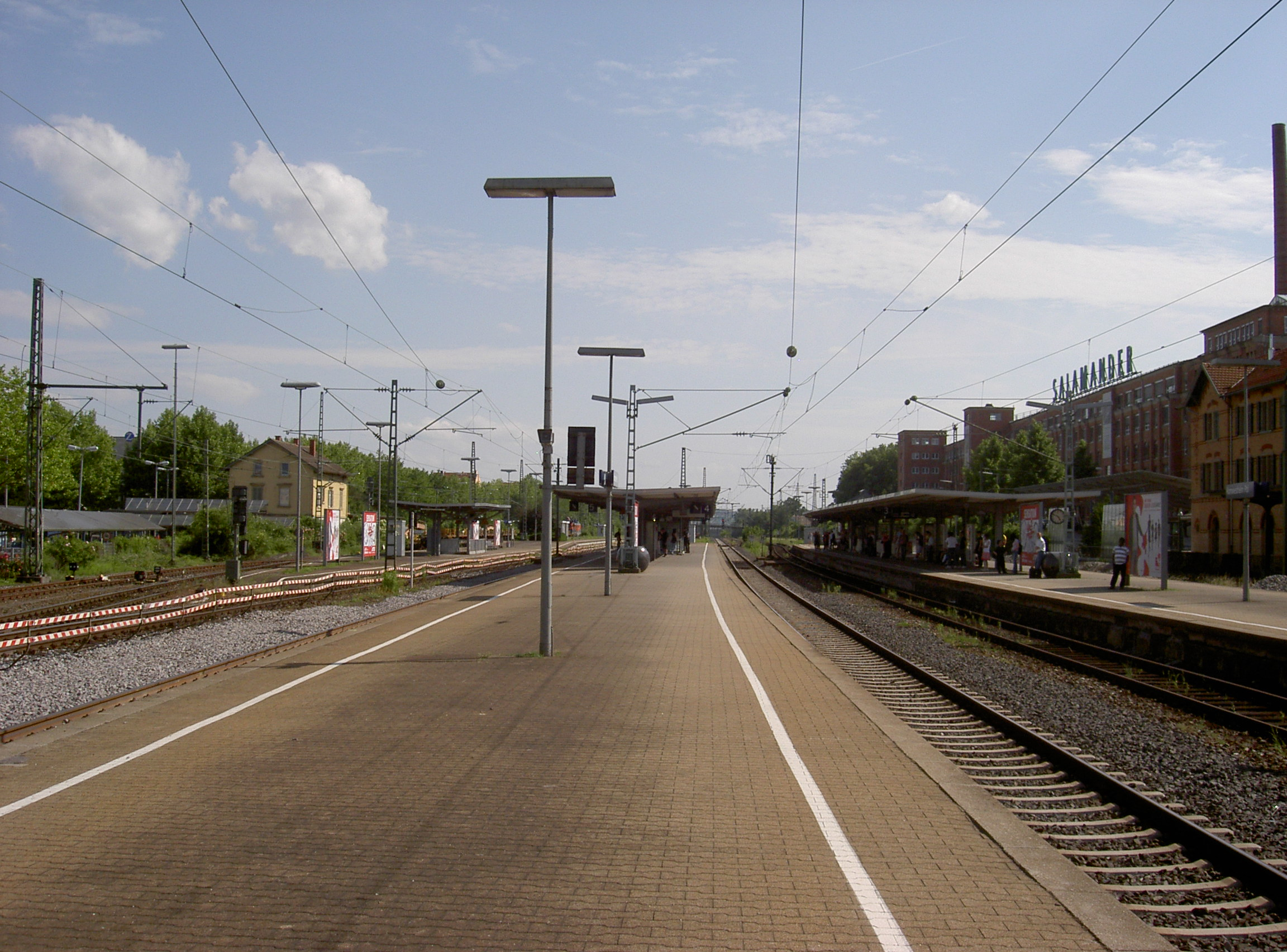
View along platform 4/5 to the south

The station is served by lines S 4 and S 5 of the Stuttgart S-Bahn. Kornwestheim station is classified by Deutsche Bahn as a category 4 station.

Track 1 is used by trains running to Stuttgart, but it is no longer accessible for passengers. Track 2 has been dismantled. S-Bahn services towards Zuffenhausen stop on track 3 and S-Bahn services towards Ludwigsburg stop on track 4. Tracks 5 and 6 are used by non-stopping trains towards Ludwigsburg. A few Regionalbahn services start or finish on track 7; it is also by freight trains running towards the railway bypass towards Untertürkheim. The track and signaling equipment are controlled by a relay interlocking, controlled remotely from Zuffenhausen station.

=== S-Bahn ===
Line	Route
S 4	Backnang – Marbach – Ludwigsburg – Kornwestheim – Zuffenhausen – Hauptbahnhof – Schwabstraße
S 5	Bietigheim – Ludwigsburg – Kornwestheim – Zuffenhausen – Hauptbahnhof – Schwabstraße

=== Regional services ===
Line	Route
RB 11	Stuttgart-Untertürkheim – Stuttgart-Münster – Kornwestheim
