= Plochingen station =

Railway station in Plochingen, Germany

Plochingen
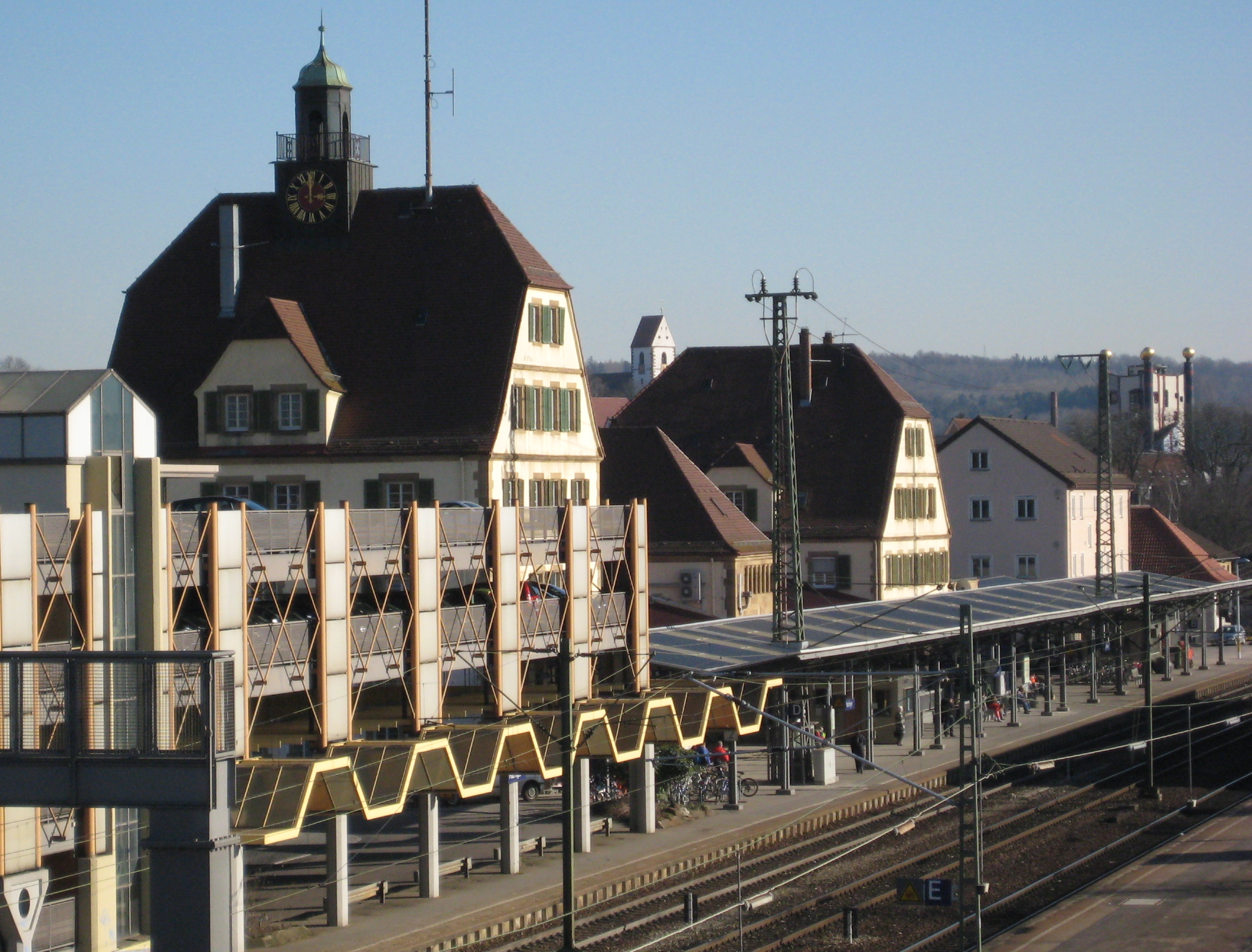
- Plochingen station

General information
- Location: Am Bahnhof 1 Plochingen, Baden-Württemberg; Germany
- Coordinates: 48°42′47″N 9°24′42″E
- Lines: Fils Valley Railway (KBS 750, KBS 790.1); Plochingen–Immendingen railway (KBS 760, KBS 790.1); Plochingen Port Railway
- Platforms: 8

Construction
- Accessible: No
- Architect: Theodor Fischer
- Architectural style: Art Nouveau

Other information
- Station code: 4967
- DS100 code: TP
- IBNR: 8000302
- Category: 2
- Fare zone: : 3
- Website: www.bahnhof.de

History
- Opened: 14 December 1846; 179 years ago
- Electrified: 1 June 1933; 93 years ago
Services
Preceding station	DB Fernverkehr	Following station
Stuttgart Hbf towards Dortmund Hbf	IC 55 Allgäu	Göppingen towards Oberstdorf
Preceding station	SVG Stuttgart	Following station
Stuttgart Hbf Terminus	FEX Südbahn	Ulm Hbf towards Singen (Hohentwiel)
Preceding station	DB Regio Baden-Württemberg	Following station
Esslingen (Neckar) towards Stuttgart Hbf	RE 5	Göppingen towards Lindau-Reutin
Preceding station	(Stuttgart)	Following station
Esslingen (Neckar) towards Stuttgart Hbf	MEX 12	Wendlingen (Neckar) towards Tübingen Hbf
Esslingen (Neckar) towards Stuttgart Hbf	MEX 18	Wendlingen (Neckar) towards Tübingen Hbf
Preceding station		Following station
Esslingen (Neckar) towards Stuttgart Hbf	MEX 16	Reichenbach (Fils) towards Ulm Hbf
Preceding station	Stuttgart S-Bahn	Following station
Altbach towards Herrenberg	S1	Wernau (Neckar) towards Kirchheim (Teck)
Location

Plochingen station is the only station in the town of Plochingen in the German state of Baden-Württemberg and the most important railway junction of the Esslingen district. It is located 22.8 kilometres from Stuttgart Hauptbahnhof on the Fils Valley Railway and at the beginning of the Plochingen–Immendingen railway.

== History ==
In the planning of the Fils Valley Railway (German: Filstalbahn) from Stuttgart to Ulm the chief engineer Michael Knoll foresaw a station southeast of Plochingen. At that time, approximately 1,900 people lived in the market town and its vineyards. On 14 December 1846, the Royal Württemberg State Railways (Königlich Württembergische Staats-Eisenbahnen) officially opened the Esslingen–Plochingen line. The completion of the next section to Süßen took place on 11 October 1847. The first station building, which no longer exists, was a two-storey sandstone building. In 1852, a second track was completed on the Fils Valley line from Cannstatt to Plochingen. On 20 September 1859, the station became a junction station with the opening of the line then called the Upper Neckar Railway (Oberen Neckarbahn) to Tübingen.

In 1900, the Royal Württemberg State Railways planned to build a railway on the south bank of the Neckar from Stuttgart to Plochingen to relieve the Fils Valley line of the transport of freight. The planners revised their concepts several times. In 1909, they decided that the line should end in Esslingen, but this variant was not realised and the plan was abandoned. Proposals for a railway link between Neuhausen and Plochingen were rejected by the State Railways.

The growth of rail traffic made an extension of the railway facilities inevitable. These included the laying of many new tracks, the widening of platforms, the installation of new signal boxes and the inauguration of a new roundhouse and water tower. The current station building was built in 1905–1907, according to a design by the famous architect Theodor Fischer in the Art Nouveau style. The workers' houses along the line were built to his plans.

On 1 June 1913, Plochingen suffered major damage from a tornado and the station was affected, particularly the platform canopies.

On 1 June 1933, the line between Stuttgart and Ulm was electrified. This linked Plochingen for the first time with the Stuttgart suburban railway services—most services from Stuttgart, however, ended in Esslingen.

Because of the dense traffic on the line and the planned Stuttgart S-Bahn, Deutsche Bundesbahn rebuilt the Esslingen–Plochingen line as four tracks. This was completed on 27 September 1970; the related upgrading of the station lasted until 1974.

The first S-Bahn line, S1 was launched to Plochingen on 1 October 1978. Plochingen took a major role in the S-Bahn, since a train depot is located there. As part of the construction, Deutsche Bundesbahn demolished the old roundhouse and the water tower.

== Track layout ==
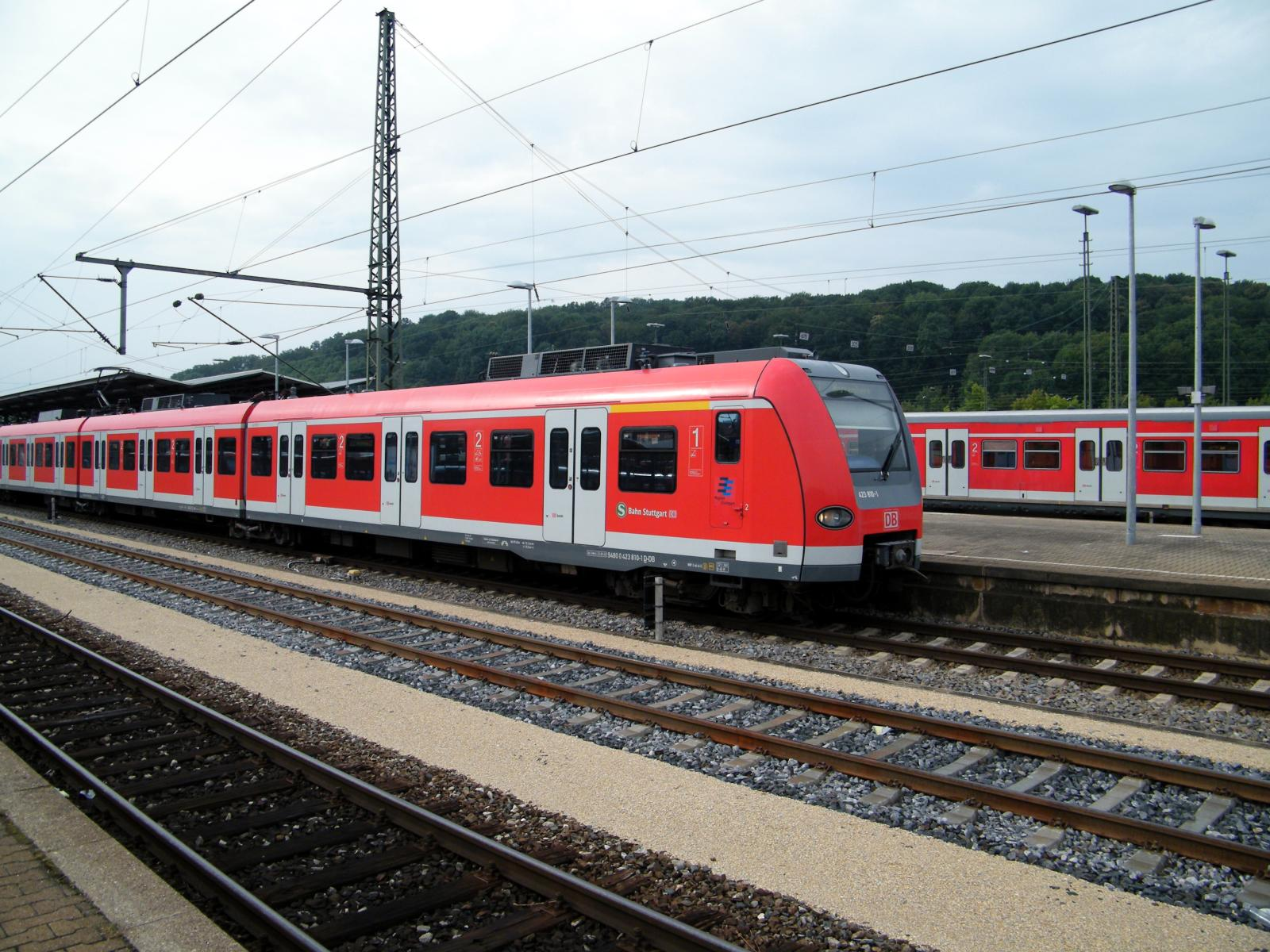
A class 423 S-Bahn train on track 9 of Plochingen station

Track 1 is adjacent to the entrance building. The through tracks, 3/4, 6/7 and 9/10, are on three central platforms, which are accessed by an underpass. In the south direction of the platform 9/10 is the bay platform 59. At the southern end of the middle platform (3/4) are two more bay platforms, tracks 52 and 53, which are only used as depot tracks. Tracks 2, 5 and 8 do not have platforms and therefore they are only used by trains running through the station without stopping. West of the platforms, there are several storage tracks for S-Bahn and freight trains. North of the station is a depot for the maintenance of electric multiple units of the Stuttgart S-Bahn. The central bus station is next to the entrance building.

== Entrance building ==
The station building of 1907 is very spacious. In its symmetry, it differs from the traditional station buildings of Württemberg. It has a long central block with a two-storey central section with a hipped roof, and the two wings with different hipped roofs. While the eastern extension has four floors, its western counterpart has a fifth floor and a clock tower on the ridge of its copper roof. The total length of the building is 96 metres.

== Rail services ==
In the 2026 timetable, the following services stopped at the station:

=== Long distance ===
Line	Route	Frequency
IC 55	Dortmund – Düsseldorf – Cologne – Bonn – Koblenz – Mainz – Mannheim – Heidelberg – Stuttgart – Plochingen – Ulm – Memmingen – Kempten – Oberstdorf	1 train towards Oberstdorf

In addition, the Schienenverkehrsgesellschaft mbH (SVG) operates FEX services on Saturday/Sunday and during holidays.

Line	Route	Frequency	Operator
FEXSüdbahn	Singen (Hohentwiel) – Radolfzell – Überlingen Therme – Friedrichshafen Stadt – Ravensburg – Aulendorf –Ulm – Plochingen – Stuttgart	limited service	SVG Stuttgart

=== Regional services ===
Line		Frequency
RE 5	Stuttgart – Esslingen – Plochingen – Göppingen – Geislingen – Ulm – Ravensburg – Friedrichshafen – Lindau-Reutin	60 min
MEX 12	(Mosbach) – Heilbronn – Stuttgart – Stuttgart-Bad Cannstatt – Esslingen – Plochingen – Wendlingen – Nürtingen – Metzingen – Reutlingen – Tübingen	60 min
MEX 16	Stuttgart – Stuttgart-Bad Cannstatt – Esslingen – Plochingen – Göppingen – Süßen – Geislingen (– Ulm)	30 min (core route); 60 min (whole route)
MEX 18	Osterburken – Stuttgart – Stuttgart-Bad Cannstatt – Esslingen – Plochingen – Wendlingen – Nürtingen – Metzingen – Reutlingen – Tübingen	60 min

=== S-Bahn ===
Line	Route
S 1	Kirchheim (Teck) – Wendlingen – Plochingen – Esslingen – Neckarpark – Bad Cannstatt – Hauptbahnhof – Schwabstraße – Vaihingen – Rohr – Böblingen – Herrenberg
