= Esslingen (Neckar) station =

Railway station in Germany

Esslingen (Neckar)
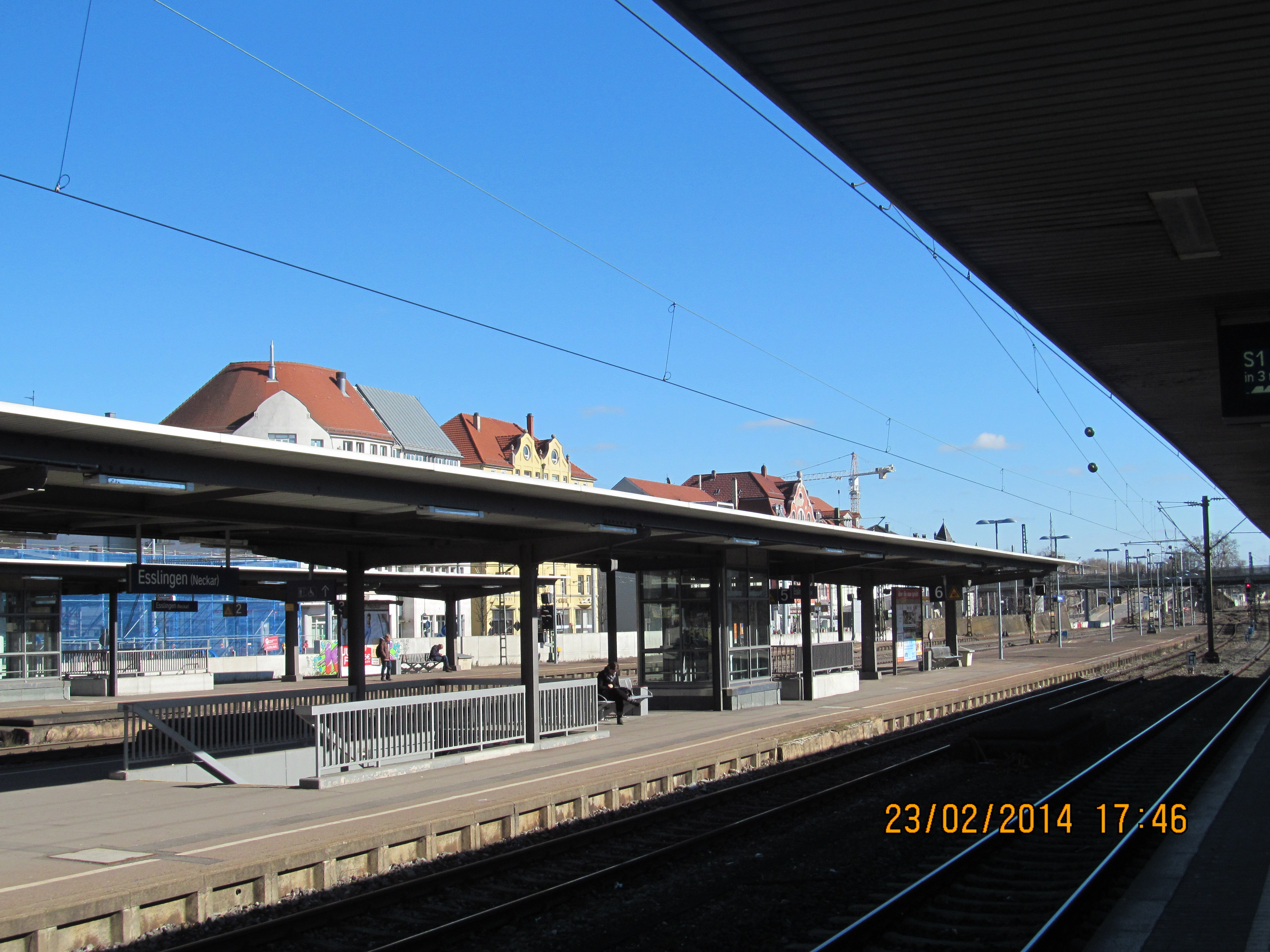
- Esslingen station

General information
- Location: Bahnhofsplatz 1, Esslingen am Neckar, Baden-Württemberg; Germany
- Coordinates: 48°44′19″N 9°18′0″E
- Lines: Fils Valley Railway (KBS 750, KBS 790.1)
- Platforms: 7

Construction
- Accessible: Yes
- Architect: Michael Knoll (1846)
- Architectural style: Rundbogenstil (1846); Renaissance Revival (1882/83)

Other information
- Station code: 1716
- DS100 code: TE
- IBNR: 8001920
- Category: 3
- Fare zone: : 2
- Website: www.bahnhof.de

History
- Opened: 20 November 1845; 180 years ago
- Electrified: 15 May 1933; 93 years ago

Services
Preceding station	DB Regio Baden-Württemberg	Following station
Stuttgart Hbf Terminus	RE 5	Plochingen towards Lindau-Reutin
Preceding station	(Stuttgart)	Following station
Stuttgart-Bad Cannstatt towards Stuttgart Hbf	MEX 12	Plochingen towards Tübingen Hbf
Stuttgart-Bad Cannstatt towards Stuttgart Hbf	MEX 18	Plochingen towards Tübingen Hbf
Preceding station		Following station
Stuttgart-Bad Cannstatt towards Stuttgart Hbf	MEX 16	Plochingen towards Ulm Hbf
Preceding station	Stuttgart S-Bahn	Following station
Mettingen towards Herrenberg	S1	Oberesslingen towards Kirchheim (Teck)
Location

Esslingen (Neckar) station is the most important station in the town of Esslingen am Neckar in the German state of Baden-Württemberg and is located 13.2 kilometres (8.2 mi) from Stuttgart Hauptbahnhof on the Fils Valley Railway.

== History ==
The former imperial city of Esslingen (then spelt Eßlingen) was at the end of the first railway line in Württemberg, the Württemberg Central Railway (German: Württembergischen Centralbahn), connecting Esslingen, Stuttgart and Ludwigsburg. Benefitting from the flat route along the Neckar, the work went forward quickly and Eßlingen station was opened to traffic on 20 November 1845. It had a two-storey entrance building and a locomotive depot. Later a residence for railway officials was added.

Not all members of the district's council saw the new transport mode as an advantage. It was the end of the line, but it was not long before construction of the Fils Valley line continued. They feared that Eßlingen station would become a minor maintenance station on the Eastern Railway between Stuttgart and Ulm. Due to the geographical location in the valley between the Filder plateau and Schurwald range, there was no question of it becoming a railway junction. Nevertheless, Eßlingen subsequently industrialised along with the rest of Germany. The numerous old factory buildings in the western part of Esslingen still bear witness to the industrialisation in the late 19th and early 20th century.

In 1852 the Royal Württemberg State Railways (Königlich Württembergische Staats-Eisenbahnen, KWStE), built a second track on the Fils Valley line between Cannstatt and Plochingen.

The station was overloaded and had to be enlarged. This resulted in a shift of the entire complex to the west. The KWStE constructed of a new entrance building on Friedrichstraße (now called Berliner Straße). Now there were ten tracks and four platforms. The freight yard had several sheds. In 1884, the city built the Bahnhofsplatz (“railway forecourt”) in front of the station. The depot premises at 2 Bahnhofsplatz 1899 is obliquely across from the post office that was built in the neo-Gothic style in 1901 and demolished in 2001. In 1909 the customs house in Eisenbahnstraße (now Fleischmannstraße) was added in the Art Nouveau style.

At the beginning of the 20th century a new railway was proposed to relieve the busy Fils Valley line, especially of freight traffic. The line would run along the south bank of the Neckar through Esslingen with a station south of the Neckar in the Pliensauvorstadt district. In 1909, decided the Württemberg State Railways decided for cost reasons not to build the new line as far as Plochingen, but only up to the existing Eßlingen station, running over a 260-metre-long bridge over the Neckar. Since the proposed railway line was always in competition with proposals to quadruplicate the Fils Valley line, it was postponed and ultimately never built.

In 1912, the Esslingen Tramway (Eßlinger Städtische Straßenbahn) was opened. The tram stop on Bahnhofsplatz served both of its lines: the through line from Obertürkheim to Oberesslingen and the city line, running on a ring through the old town. The latter ran only until 1915. Trams ran on the through line until 1944, when it was replaced by the Esslingen am Neckar trolleybus system.

The Esslingen–Nellingen–Denkendorf Tramway (Straßenbahn Esslingen–Nellingen–Denkendorf GmbH, END) terminated at a return loop in the Bahnhofsplatz from 1926 to 1978. The interurban tramway linked the communities on the Filder plateau, Nellingen and Denkendorf with Esslingen. In 1929, a branch to Scharnhausen and Neuhausen auf den Fildern was added.

From 14 October 1931, the Fils Valley line between Stuttgart Hauptbahnhof and Esslingen was made four-track. Electrification was inaugurated on the line on 15 May 1933 and suburban services were subsequently established to Stuttgart; these later developed into the Stuttgart S-Bahn. On 15 May 1939 Eßlingen station was renamed Eßlingen (Neckar) station. The station was renamed Esslingen (Neckar) station on 27 September 1965, after the city had similarly changed its spelling in the previous year.

It appears that the statement of the skeptical city officials in the mid-19th century has become true in part. Although Esslingen station is now a transfer point between the S-Bahn and regional trains, all long-distance trains pass by without stopping. Nevertheless, it is not an insignificant station.

== Entrance building ==
Construction of the first single-storey station building in 1846 was probably led by George Morlok to a design by Michael Knoll. Knoll's design was in a simple style and a slim, eight-axis construction with a gable roof. On the city side there was an entranceway through an arcade.

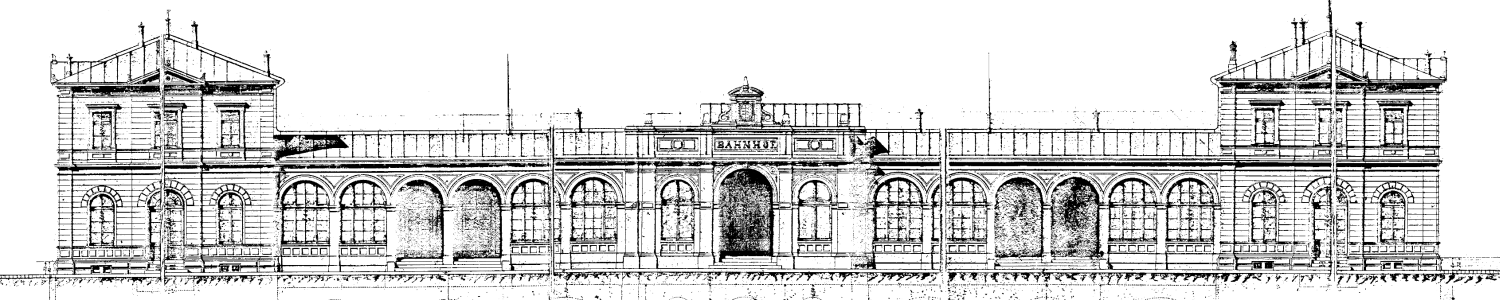
Entrance building in 1882/83, city side

In the 1880s, Esslingen had over 20,000 inhabitants and was the fourth largest city in Württemberg. Therefore, the state railway built a magnificent new entrance building in response to the otherwise frugal station. It was built from 1882 to 1883 in an Italian renaissance style. The building consists of an elongated 15-axis, single-story central building and two two-story wing buildings. The central section is preceded by a portico.

For the design of the entrance portal in the centre of the middle section, the architect was probably inspired by a Roman triumphal arch. The Württemberg coat of arms surrounded by oak leaves and laurels is clearly visible above the entrance. Above that is inscribed MDCCCLXXXIII (1883). On the buttress below is inscribed in large letters the word Bahnhof (station). The old station building, which stood at the end of the street of Bahnhofstraße was closed. Part of it was acquired by the Friedr. Dick Company, which rebuilt it on its factory premises as an office building. It were demolished in the late 1980s.

The entrance building was rehabilitated with energy-saving measures under the 2009 economic stimulus package. In addition to the platforms were made more accessible by lifts.

== Rail services ==
The station is served by regional trains and line S 1 of the Stuttgart S-Bahn. Track 1 and the main platform no longer exist. No trains are scheduled to stop on track 2. Track 3 is used by regional trains running to Bad Cannstatt. Track 4 has no platform, and is used by fast-moving long-distance and freight trains. Tracks 5 and 6 are used by regional trains running towards Plochingen. Track 7 is used by regional and S-Bahn trains towards Bad Cannstatt and track 8 is used for services towards Plochingen. Tracks 9 and 10 are used by freight and terminate at a buffer in the Plochingen direction.

Esslingen (Neckar) station is classified by Deutsche Bahn as a category 3 station.

=== Regional services ===
Line		Frequency
RE 5	Stuttgart – Bad Cannstatt – Esslingen (Neckar) – Plochingen – Göppingen – Geislingen (Steige) – Ulm – Aulendorf – Friedrichshafen (– Lindau-Reutin)	60 minutes
MEX 12	Heilbronn – Stuttgart – Bad Cannstatt – Esslingen – Plochingen – Nürtingen – Metzingen – Reutlingen – Tübingen	60 mins
MEX 16	Stuttgart – Bad Cannstatt – Esslingen – Plochingen – Göppingen – Geislingen (Steige) (– Ulm)	30 mins, 60 mins to Ulm
MEX 18	Osterburken – Heilbronn – Stuttgart – Bad Cannstatt – Esslingen – Plochingen – Wendlingen – Nürtingen – Metzingen (Württ) – Reutlingen – Tübingen	60 mins

=== S-Bahn ===
Line	Route
S 1	Kirchheim (Teck) – Wendlingen – Plochingen – Esslingen – Neckarpark – Bad Cannstatt – Hauptbahnhof – Schwabstraße – Vaihingen – Rohr – Böblingen – Herrenberg
