= Freiberg (Neckar) station =

Railway station in Germany

Freiberg (Neckar)
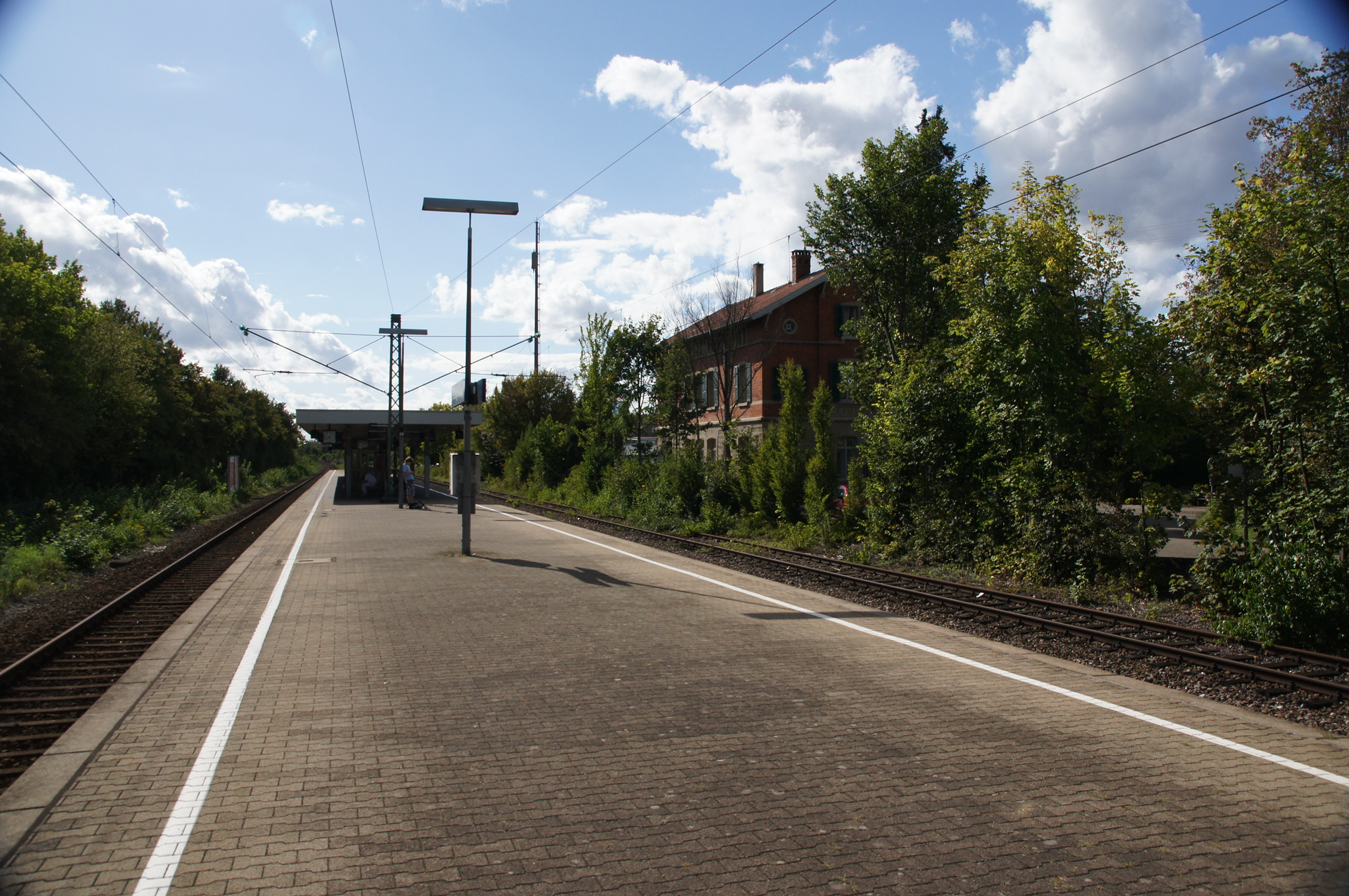

General information
- Location: Freiberg am Neckar, Baden-Württemberg; Germany
- Coordinates: 48°55′47″N 9°11′51″E
- Lines: Backnang–Ludwigsburg railway (KBS 790.4)
- Platforms: 2

Construction
- Accessible: Yes

Other information
- Station code: 1890
- DS100 code: TFG
- IBNR: 8002065
- Category: 5
- Fare zone: : 3
- Website: www.bahnhof.de

History
- Opened: 8 December 1879
Location

Freiberg (Neckar) station (called Beihingen-Heutingsheim until 31 May 1975) is located at 19.4 kilometre point of the Backnang–Ludwigsburg railway and is a station of the Stuttgart S-Bahn. Until the end of World War II it was connected by a line to Bietigheim, which was formally closed on 15 January 1958.

== History ==
=== Planning and Construction ===
In the mid-1860s, the Royal Württemberg State Railways planned the Murr Valley Railway from Backnang to Bietigheim, the starting point of the Western Railway, for through traffic from Bavaria to Baden. It would run via Kirchberg, Steinheim, Pleidelsheim and Großingersheim.

After the Franco-Prussian War of 1870/71, the railways administration amended these plans because, among other things, the Imperial Railway Office (Reichseisenbahnamt) in Berlin saw this east–west connection as having value for military strategy. It was now regarded as the fastest way for military trains to deploy troops from Middle Franconia to the French border. At that time, it was envisaged that all trains would need to reverse in Bietigheim, which would have led to delays. To avoid this, it was then decided to build the southern section to reach Bietigheim station from the southeast. It was finally decided on 23 March 1873 to build a station in the village of Beihingen am Neckar. At a later stage a branch would be built to Ludwigsburg.

=== State Railways period ===
On 8 December 1879, the State Railways commenced operations on the line from Backnang to Bietigheim and opened Beihingen station. The original station building still exists. The ground floor consists of sandstone, the floor and the Kniestock (“knee jamb”, which raises the base of a pitched roof to give more usable space) is built of brick.

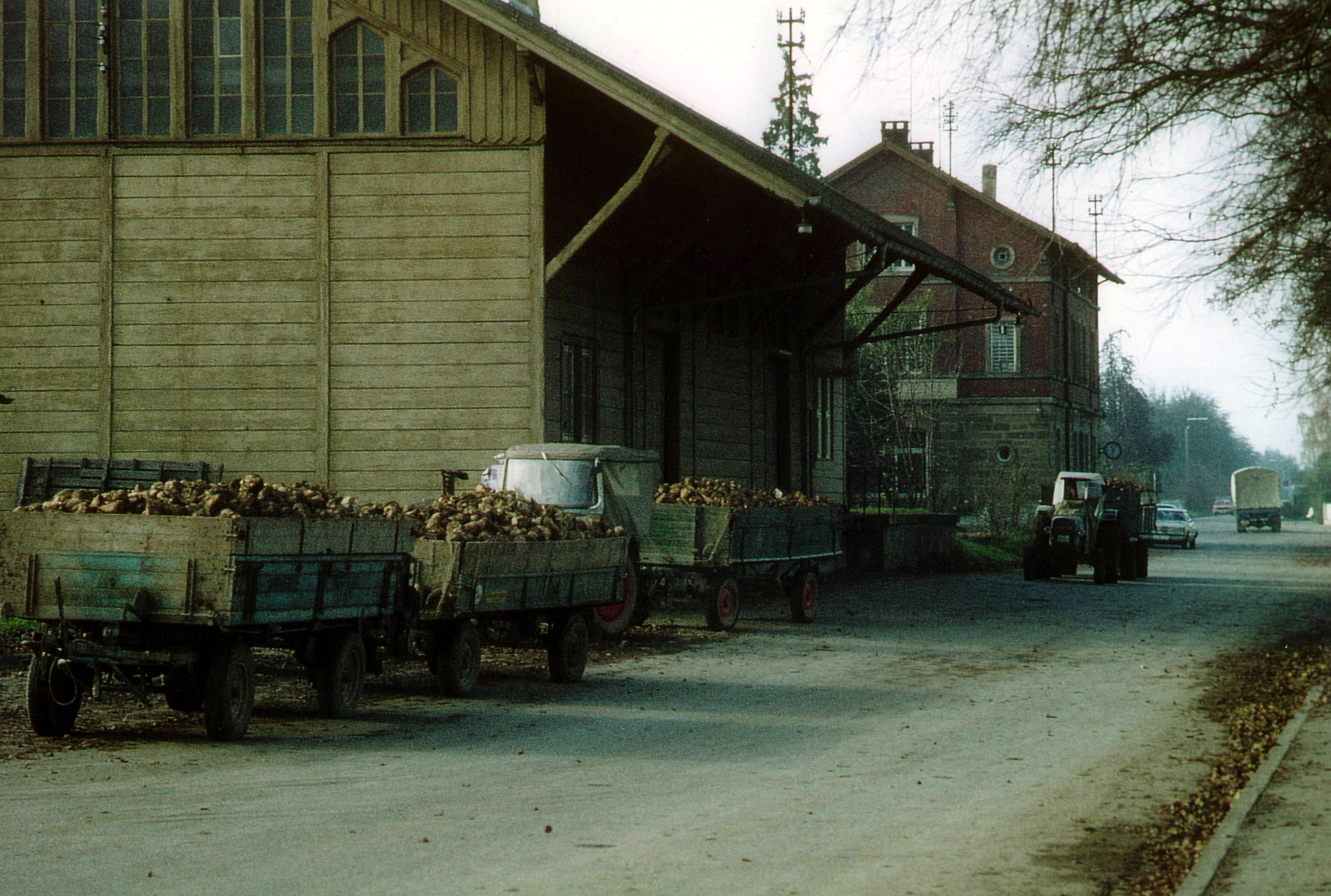
Shipment of sugar beet in the spring of 1974

The freight shed is also still preserved to the east of the station building. In addition to agricultural products—mainly sugar—gravel from the Neckar river was also loaded as a building material.

On 25 August 1879, the Württemberg Parliament approved the construction of the branch line to Ludwigsburg. Its commissioning on 15 October 1881 made Beihingen into a railway junction, albeit of little significance. Beihingen had been selected as a possible starting point of the proposed Bottwar Valley Railway, but the experts ultimately decided to build it from Marbach.

In the 19th century, the State Railways called the station Beihingen-Heutingsheim. At that time, it gradually changed the way of life of the two villages. The citizens, who had previously farmed or practiced a craft looked further afield for factory jobs. To improve the economics of the gravel loading, a cable car was built in 1905 to transport the material from the Neckar to the station, but in 1922, it was closed.

=== Beihingen-Heutingsheim during the Second World War ===
After the outbreak of war on 1 September 1939, the importance of the Backnang–Bietigheim route rose again for the transport of troops between the fronts. The station, the line and nearby trains were the targets of Allied air raids from 1944. On 20 April 1945 retreating Wehrmacht units blew up all the railway bridges around Beihingen-Heutingsheim.

=== Bundesbahn period ===
Commuter operations ran towards Ludwigsburg after the war and the Beihingen-Heutingsheim–Bietigheim section was abandoned. Deutsche Bundesbahn officially closed it on 15 January 1958.

On 1 January 1972, the municipalities of Beihingen am Neckar, Heutingsheim and Geisingen am Neckar joined together as the municipality of Freiberg am Neckar. Deutsche Bundesbahn left the station name as Beihingen-Heutingsheim for the time being, but changed it on 1 June 1975 to Freiberg (Neckar).

Deutsche Bundesbahn modernised the line between Ludwigsburg and Marbach for future S-Bahn traffic. Besides electrification, it built a second track between Favoritepark and Freiberg. S-Bahn line S4 commenced operations on 28 September 1980.

== Rail operations ==
The station is served by Stuttgart S-Bahn line S 4. Track 1, the former home platform (next to the station building) is no longer used. S-Bahn services towards Ludwigsburg stop on platform track 2. Track 3 is used by services towards Backnang. Freiberg (Neckar) station is classified by Deutsche Bahn as a category 5 station.

Line	Route
S 4	Backnang – Marbach – Freiberg (Neckar) – Ludwigsburg – Zuffenhausen – Stuttgart North – Hauptbahnhof – Schwabstraße
