= Schwaikheim station =

Railway station in Germany

Schwaikheim
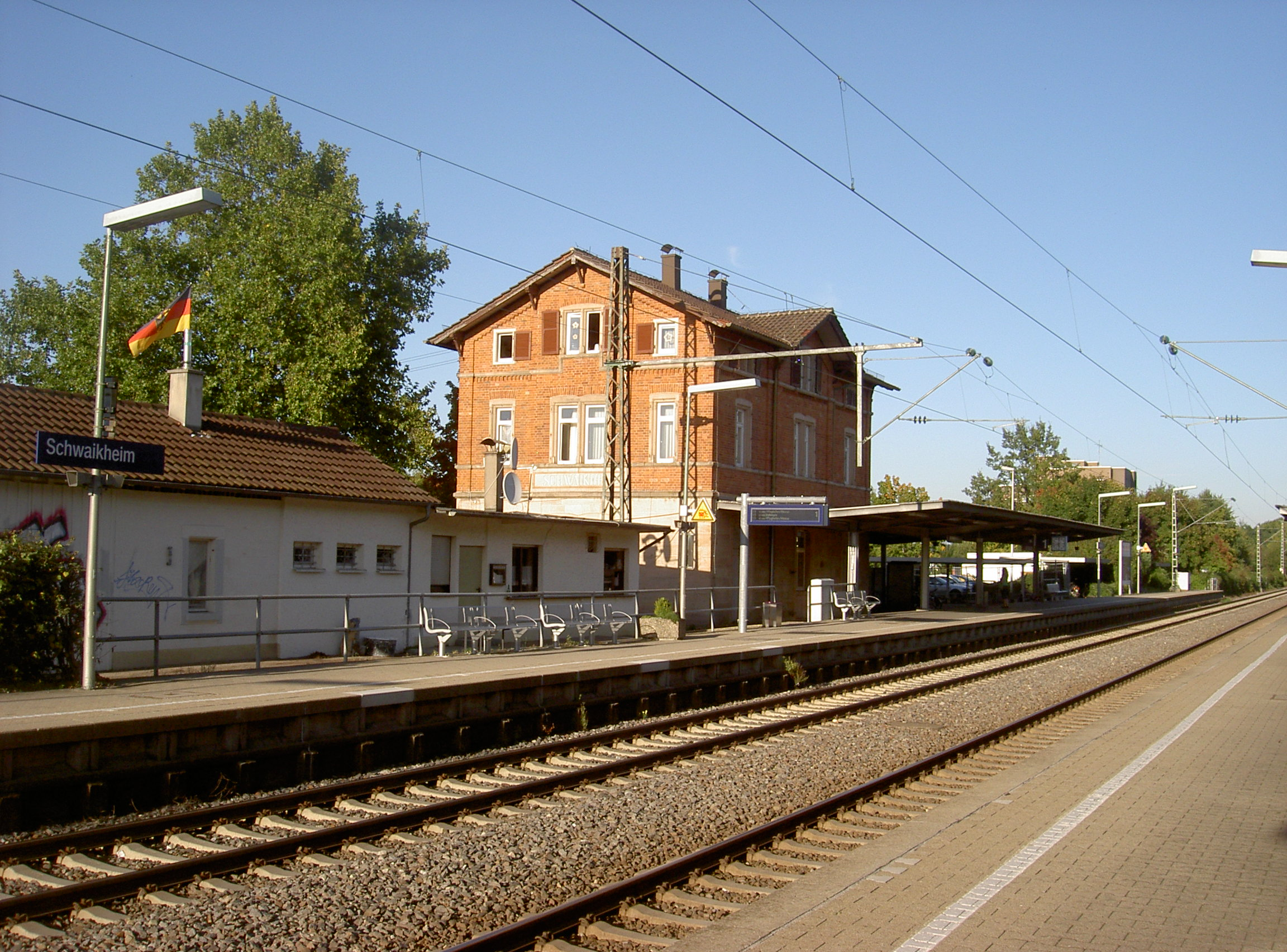

General information
- Location: Fritz-Müller-Allee 4, Schwaikheim, Baden-Württemberg; Germany
- Coordinates: 48°52′5″N 9°21′16″E
- Lines: Waiblingen–Schwäbisch Hall railway (KBS 785, KBS 790.3)
- Platforms: 2

Construction
- Accessible: Yes

Other information
- Station code: 5707
- DS100 code: TSWK
- IBNR: 8005454
- Category: 5
- Fare zone: : 3
- Website: www.bahnhof.de

History
- Opened: 26 October 1876

Services
Preceding station	Stuttgart S-Bahn	Following station
Neustadt-Hohenacker towards Flughafen/Messe	S3	Winnenden towards Backnang
Location

Schwaikheim station is located in Schwaikheim at the 6.8 kilometre point of the Waiblingen–Schwäbisch Hall railway in the German state of Baden-Württemberg and is a station on the Stuttgart S-Bahn network.

== History ==
In the 1860s, engineers were planning a railway line from Waiblingen to Backnang. They worked initially on two proposals. The first would have meant a line running via Korb to Winnenden. The second proposal was to extend the line as far as possible through the Rems valley, leaving it near Großheppach to turn north. Ultimately, the decision was made to build a viaduct over the Rems at Neustadt and use the current route, which runs on a lower and more westerly alignment than either of the original proposals. Schwaikheim Schultheiß (mayor) Gebhard Friedrich Simon, who at that time sat as a deputy in the Württemberg parliament, campaigned strongly for a rail connection for his home town.

Some earthworks were necessary in the Schwaikheim district. The Royal Württemberg State Railways had to dig a tunnel for the railway line to climb from the Erbach valley to Winnenden. A straight course to the east was created by building a railway embankment over the Lohwiesenbach.

The station was a kilometre south of Schwaikheim. The State Railway asked the local council to build a broad road to the station. But this was refused and it built a road that was only as wide as a pedestrian path.

The station building has been preserved. It is a two-storey building with a gable roof that is 15 metres long and nine metres wide. The ground floor consists of sandstone and the upper floor is built of brick. The ground floor initially had a post office with a telegraph office.

=== Opening and development ===
Schwaikheim station was officially opened on 26 October 1876. The State Railway took the first section of the Waiblingen–Schwäbisch Hall railway (Murr Valley Railway) between Waiblingen and Backnang into operation on that day.

The council built the Bahnhofstrasse (station road). Initially, however, it was only a dirt road. It was not upgraded until 1907, when it was extended; it is now Kreisstraße (county road) 1911 from Waiblingen to Winnenden.

Schwaikheim grew in the direction of the railway station and evolved from a farming village into a commuter suburb. Farming is now only a sideline for many.

=== Modernisation ===
Between 1962 and 1965, the tracks were duplicated and electrified on the Waiblingen–Backnang section. On either side of the station the line was slightly realigned. A pedestrian underpass was built at the station. Deutsche Bundesbahn planned it with a width of two metres, but the council insisted on a width of three metres.

As a further improvement to local services, Deutsche Bundesbahn took S-Bahn line S 3 into operation between Backnang and Schwabstraße on 27 September 1981.

== Infrastructure ==
Until 1965, the station had a single-track passing line. There has been no alternative tracks since the duplication of the Murr Valley Railway. The two main lines have platforms on the outsides of the line since the duplication of the Murr Valley Railway. Until the 1990s, there was still a freight loading track to the east of the station building, which has since been dismantled and replaced by a parking lot.

== Rail operations ==
The station is served by line S 3 of the Stuttgart S-Bahn. Platform track 1 (next to the station building) is used by S-Bahn services towards Waiblingen. Track 2 is used by S-Bahn services towards Backnang. The station is classified by Deutsche Bahn as a category 5 station.

=== S-Bahn ===
Line	Route
S 3	Backnang – Winnenden – Schwaikheim – Waiblingen – Bad Cannstatt – Hauptbahnhof – Schwabstraße – Vaihingen – Rohr – Stuttgart Flughafen/Messe (extra trains in the peak between Backnang and Vaihingen).
