= Fellbach station =

Railway station in Fellbach, Germany

Fellbach
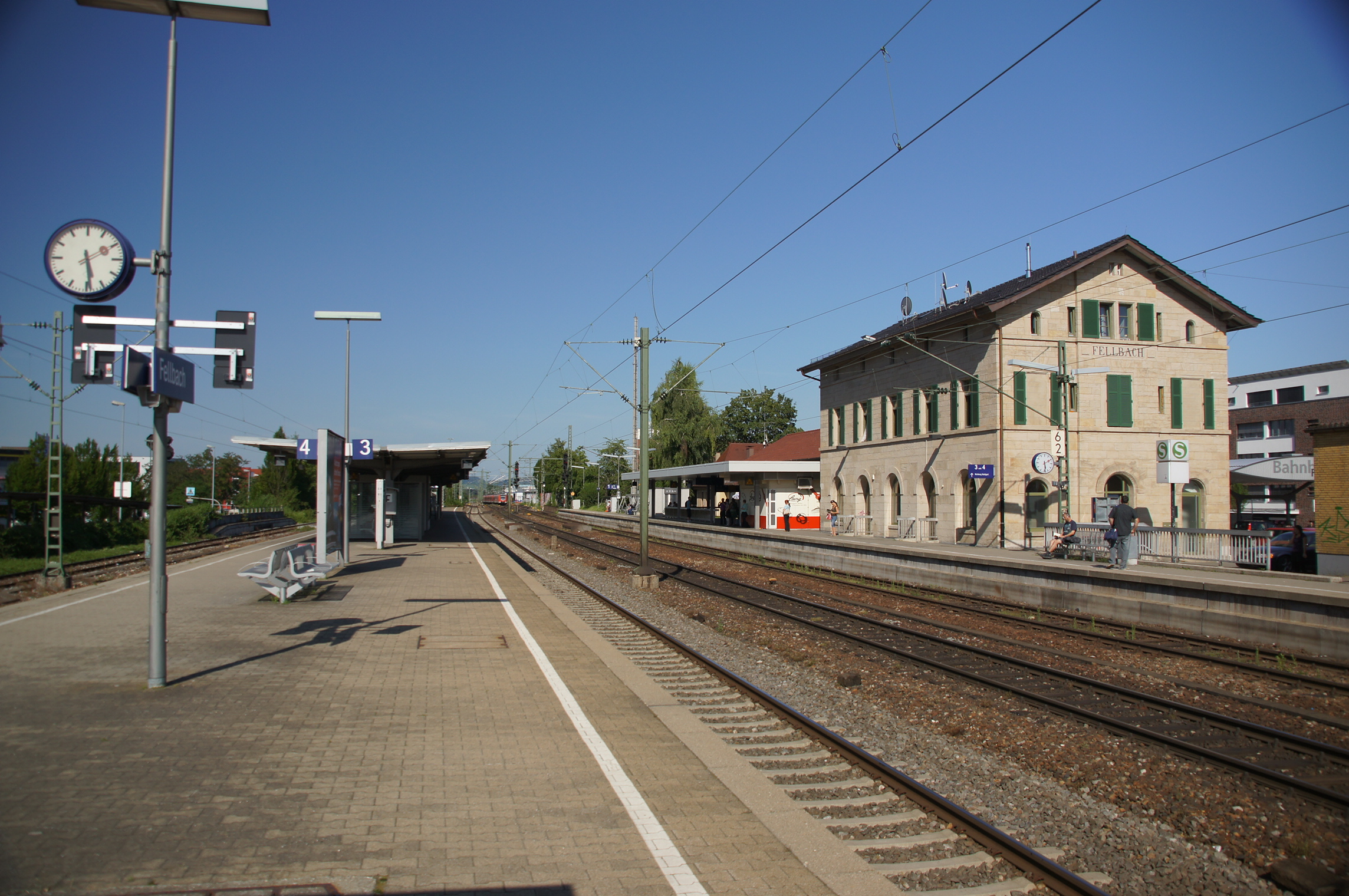

General information
- Location: Eisenbahnstr. 14, Fellbach, Baden-Württemberg; Germany
- Coordinates: 48°49′12″N 9°16′12″E
- Lines: Stuttgart-Bad Cannstatt–Nördlingen railway (KBS 786, KBS 790.2-3)
- Platforms: 3

Construction
- Accessible: Yes

Other information
- Station code: 5085
- DS100 code: TFE
- IBNR: 8001974
- Category: 3
- Fare zone: : 1 and 2
- Website: www.bahnhof.de

History
- Opened: 25 July 1861

Services
Preceding station	Stuttgart S-Bahn	Following station
Sommerrain towards Filderstadt	S2	Waiblingen towards Schorndorf
Sommerrain towards Flughafen/Messe	S3	Waiblingen towards Backnang
Location

Fellbach station is located in Fellbach on the Stuttgart-Bad Cannstatt–Nördlingen railway in the German state of Baden-Württemberg and is a station on the Stuttgart S-Bahn network.

== History ==
During the construction of the Stuttgart–Nördlingen railway by the Royal Württemberg State Railways in 1861, it built a station for Fellbach on the fields of the village of Schmiden as the only station between Cannstatt and Waiblingen. It was at that time about one kilometre north of Fellbach and one and a half kilometres south of Schmiden at the boundary of the two villages. Even before the construction of the railway, Fellbach had almost 3,000 inhabitants and was one of the largest villages in Württemberg.

The railway was opened on 25 July 1861. The station building has been preserved and is still used as such. It was built of light sandstone and has two full floors and a Kniestock ("knee jamb", which raises the base of a pitched roof to give more usable space). Windows and doors on the ground floor have rounded arches.

Between 1862 and 1869 the newly established post office operated from the building. Then it was transferred to Cannstatter Straße. In 1864, the State Railways opened a second main line track from Cannstatt to Fellbach.

The volume of traffic rose steadily, as did the number of inhabitants of Fellbach and Schmiden, which both grew towards the station.

=== Deutsche Reichsbahn ===
Deutsche Reichsbahn enlarged the station between 1923 and 1925. It created a platform underpass for passengers.

In the late 1920s the city of Stuttgart proposed to incorporate Fellbach. On 4 May 1929, services on the Stuttgart tramway were extended to Fellbacher Lutherkirche. This meant that some commuters no longer had to walk to the station. This affected Deutsche Reichsbahn: in the annual accounts of 1928, the number of passengers was 337,868, by 1932 this figure had dropped to 228,417.

In October 1931, the council negotiated with a representative of the Stuttgart City Council. As conditions for agreeing to be incorporated, the local council's requests included the extension of the tram line to the station, the closure of the level crossing on Bahnhofstraße, next to the station, in favour of an underpass and a commuter service between Stuttgart and Fellbach.

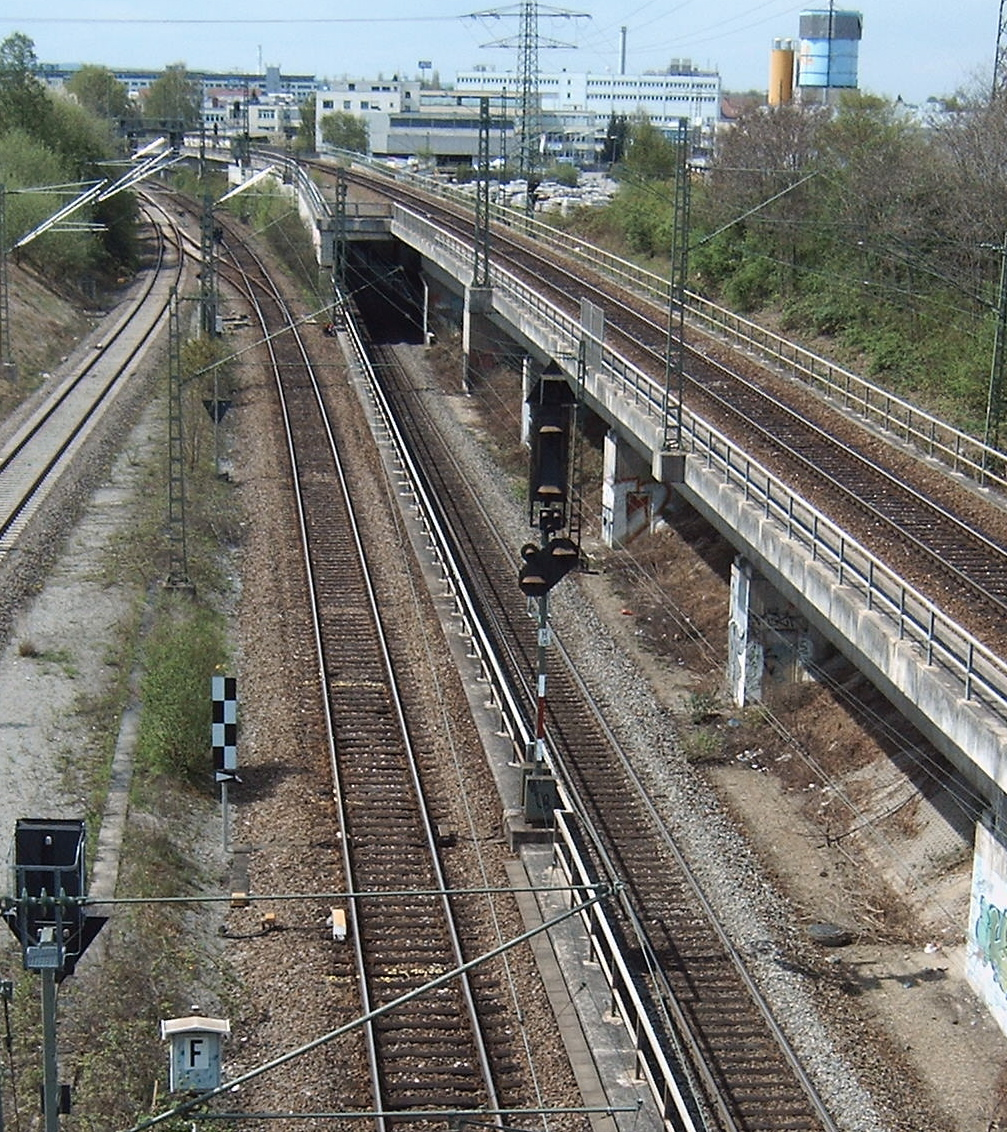
Flying junction between Fellbach and Waiblingen, completed in 1981

As a result of these and other demands, the Stuttgart City Council rejected the draft agreement of incorporation of 8 March 1932 on 1 April 1932. Fellbach thus remained independent and was then known as "the largest village in Württemberg " as it then had more than 11,000 inhabitants. On 29 October 1933, it received its own charter as a town.

=== Deutsche Bundesbahn period ===
On 2 October 1949, Deutsche Bundesbahn completed electrification of the Bad Cannstatt–Waiblingen stretch and electric suburban services began operating between Stuttgart and Waiblingen. In 1959, the wait at the level crossing on Bahnhofstraße also became a thing of the past when an underpass was completed.

On 1 January 1973, Schmiden was incorporated in Fellbach as the two towns had grown together over the decades around the station.

In the course of the development of the line for the Stuttgart S-Bahn between 1979 and 1981, there were comprehensive alterations of the track at the station, including the upgrading of the line between Bad Cannstatt and Waiblingen to four tracks. At the east end of the station a traffic control centre was built and, further towards Waiblingen, a flying junction was built to separate traffic from Bad Cannstatt and running towards the Murr Railway from traffic coming from the Murr Railway.

== Rail operations ==
The station is served by lines S 2 and S 3 of the Stuttgart S-Bahn. Platform track 1 (next to the station building) is used by S-Bahn services towards Waiblingen. Track 2 is used by trains that do not stop running towards Waiblingen. Track 3 used to be used by trains running to the east. Track 4 is used by S-Bahn services towards Bad Cannstatt. Track 5, which has no platform, is the fast track towards Bad Cannstatt.

Nürnbergerstraße station is classified by Deutsche Bahn as a category 3 station. It has a relay interlocking of class DRS60, which is now operated from Wailblingen.

=== S-Bahn ===
Line	Route
S 2	Schorndorf – Weinstadt – Waiblingen – Fellbach – Bad Cannstatt – Hauptbahnhof – Schwabstraße – Vaihingen – Rohr – Stuttgart Flughafen/Messe – Filderstadt (extra trains in the peak between Schorndorf and Vaihingen.)
S 3	Backnang – Winnenden – Waiblingen – Fellbach – Bad Cannstatt – Hauptbahnhof – Vaihingen – Rohr – Flughafen/Messe (extra trains in the peak between Backnang and Vaihingen).
