= Winnenden station =

Railway station in Winnenden, Germany

Winnenden
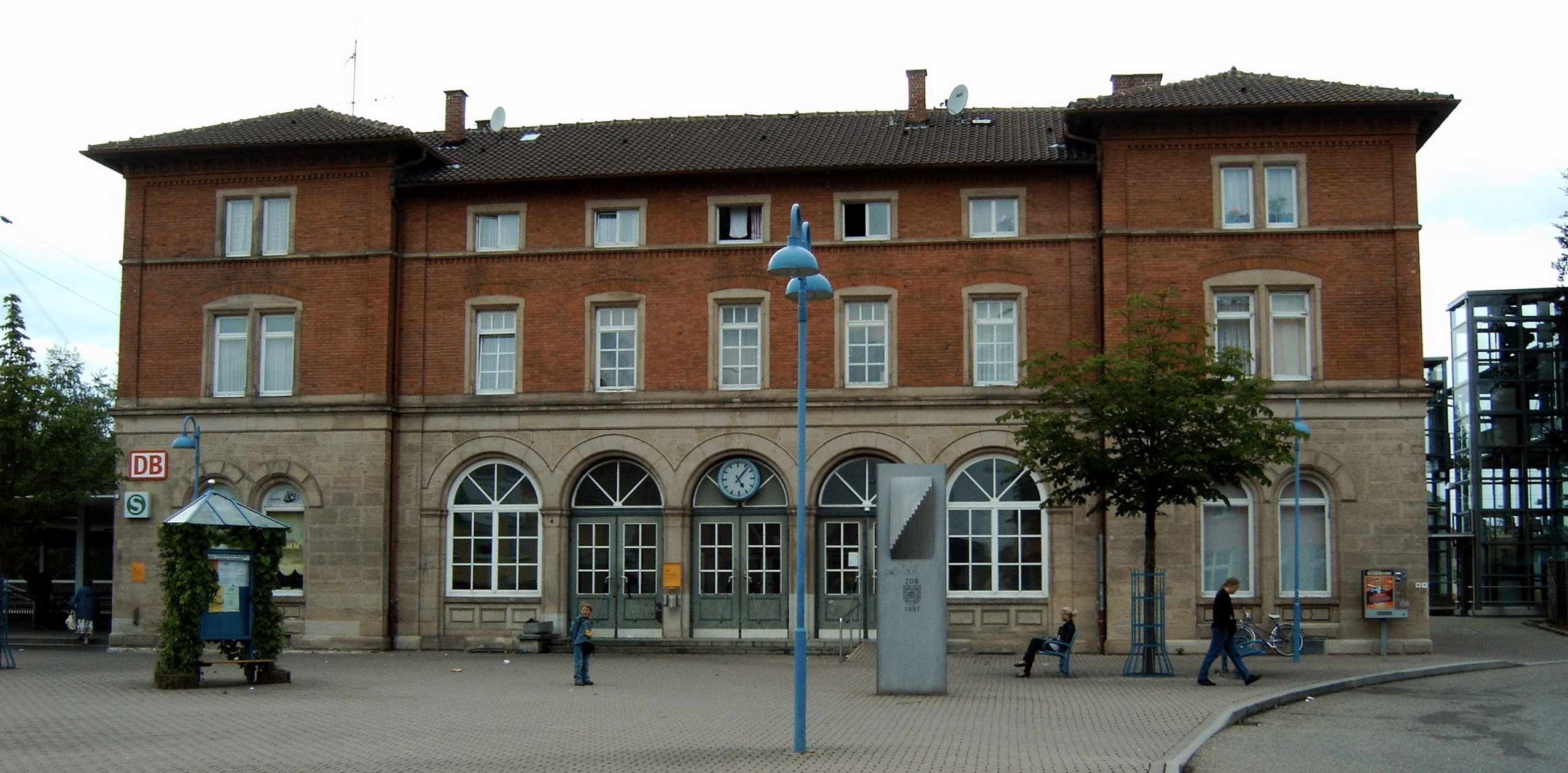
- Station building

General information
- Location: Bahnhofstr. 4, Winnenden, Baden-Württemberg; Germany
- Coordinates: 48°52′46″N 9°23′33″E
- Elevation: 287 m (942 ft)
- Line: Waiblingen–Schwäbisch Hall railway (km 9.9)
- Platforms: 3

Construction
- Accessible: Yes

Other information
- Station code: 6801
- DS100 code: TWI
- IBNR: 8006479
- Category: 3
- Fare zone: : 3
- Website: www.bahnhof.de

History
- Opened: 26 October 1876

Services
Preceding station		Following station
Waiblingen towards Stuttgart Hbf	RE 90	Backnang towards Nürnberg Hbf
Preceding station	DB Regio Baden-Württemberg	Following station
Waiblingen towards Stuttgart Hbf	MEX 19	Backnang towards Schwäbisch Hall-Hessental or Crailsheim
Waiblingen towards Stuttgart Hbf	MEX 90	Backnang towards Schwäbisch Hall-Hessental
Preceding station	Stuttgart S-Bahn	Following station
Schwaikheim towards Flughafen/Messe	S3	Nellmersbach towards Backnang
Location

Winnenden station is a station in Winnenden in Baden-Württemberg, Germany. It lies on the Waiblingen–Schwäbisch Hall railway a few hundred metres northwest of the town centre and about one kilometre south of Leutenbach. The station is served by Regional-Express and Stuttgart S-Bahn trains. DB designates it as a class 3 station.

== History ==
The station was opened with the construction of the line, which was opened on 26 October 1876. At that time, platform 1 (next to the station building) was on a through track. With the duplication of the Waiblingen–Schwäbisch Hall railway from 1962 to 1965, major changes were made to the station tracks, which were electrified and integrated into the Stuttgart suburban rail network. The tracks were shifted slightly on both sides of the station, since then tracks 2 and 3 have been the through tracks. With the upgrade for the S-Bahn around 1980, the platforms were raised to a height of 96 cm. The freight sidings north of the entrance building have been replaced by a park + ride area. The fourth track, which had no platform, was also dismantled.

== Forecourt ==
In front of the station there are several park and ride parking spaces, a station kiosk, bicycle parking spaces and a taxi rank. A Deutsche Bahn Travel Center and toilets are located on the ground floor of the entrance building. Rental apartments are provided on the upper floors.

== Platforms ==
The station has three platform faces, including platform 1 next to the station building and an island platform (platforms 2 and 3). Platform 1 is no longer used in scheduled passenger traffic, platform 2 is used by Regional-Express and S-Bahn trains towards Backnang, while platform 3 is used for services to Stuttgart. The station is located in fare zone 3 of the Verkehrs- und Tarifverbund Stuttgart (VVS) area.

Platform	Platform height	Platform length	Accessibility
Platform 1	76 cm	301 m	Not normally used for passenger traffic
Platform 2	96 cm	305 m	Accessible via a lift
Platform 3	96 cm	305 m	Accessible via a lift

== Train services ==
Services as of 2023:

Route		Frequency
MEX 19	Stuttgart – Bad Cannstatt – Waiblingen – Winnenden – Backnang – Gaildorf West (– Schwäbisch Hall-Hessental – Crailsheim)	60 mins (Mon–Fri only, afternoons to Schwäbisch Hall, some trains to Crailsheim)
MEX 90	Stuttgart – Bad Cannstatt – Waiblingen – Winnenden – Backnang – Gaildorf West – Schwäbisch Hall-Hessental (– Crailsheim)	120 mins (in the peak to Crailsheim)
RE 90	Stuttgart – Bad Cannstatt – Waiblingen – Winnenden – Backnang – Schwäbisch Hall-Hessental – Crailsheim – Ansbach – Nuremberg	120 mins
S 3	Airport/Trade Fair – Rohr – Vaihingen – Hauptbahnhof – Bad Cannstatt – Waiblingen – Winnenden – Backnang	Half-hourly (quarter-hourly in the peak, with additional trains between Vaihingen and Backnang)

== Bus services ==
Bus routes 210, 310, 330, 331, 332, 334, 335, 336, 337, 340 and 456 connect the station with the surrounding area, running from the Winnenden central bus station, which is located directly in front of the station.
