= Backnang–Ludwigsburg railway =

Railway line in Germany

Overview
- Line number: 4830 (ehem. Ludwigsburg–Freiberg); 4931 (Backnang–Ludwigsburg); 4902 (Freiberg–Bietig.-Bi.)
- Locale: Baden-Württemberg, Germany

Service
- Route number: 790.4-5 (Marbach–Ludwigsburg)

Technical
- Line length: Backnang–Ludwigsburg: 24.5 km (15.2 mi); Freiberg–Bietigh.-Bi.: 6.3 km (3.9 mi)
- Number of tracks: Freiberg–Ludwigsburg: 2
- Minimum radius: 400 m (1,312 ft)
- Maximum incline: 1%

The Backnang–Ludwigsburg railway is a line on the northern edge of the Stuttgart region in the German state of Baden-Württemberg, linking Backnang and Ludwigsburg. The Backnang–Bietigheim line was opened in 1879 as a branch of the Murr Valley Railway from Waiblingen to Hessenthal and left the current route at Beihingen-Heutingsheim (now part of Freiberg am Neckar). The section between Beihingen-Heutingsheim and Bietigheim (now called Bietigheim-Bissingen) was damaged during the Second World War and was never returned to operation.

Between Ludwigsburg and Marbach the line has been part of the Stuttgart S-Bahn network since 1980. The Marbach–Backnang section is currently being rebuilt so that it can be integrated into the S-Bahn. The Ludwigsburg–Backnang line is sometimes referred to as the Kleine Murrbahn ("Little Murr Railway"). The fully electrified and partially double track line is of considerable importance for freight transport as a link between the Kornwestheim marshalling yard (Kornwestheimer Rangierbahnhof) and Nuremberg.

== Route ==
=== Backnang–Ludwigsburg line ===
The line starts in the heights above the Murr at Backnang station. While the Murr Railway runs to the southwest and, after separating from the Little Murr line to Ludwigsburg under the B 14 highway, leaves the Murr valley, swinging south towards Waiblingen. The Little Murr line follows the twisting valley of the Murr to Kirchberg. Thereafter, the line leaves the floor of the valley and after Erdmannhausen runs through a 2 km long and up to 11 m deep cutting through the watershed between the Murr and the Neckar. After Marbach station a siding branches off to the north of the line and runs to Marbach power station—until 1989 there was a remnant here of the former 750 mm gauge Bottwar Valley Railway (Bottwartalbahn).

After crossing the 335 m long Neckar Viaduct over a loop of the Neckar it reaches Benningen. From Freiberg the line is now double-track. The line passes through Favoritepark and crosses the B 27 highway to reach Ludwigsburg station. The line runs over a flying junction over the tracks of the Stuttgart–Bietigheim-Bissingen line and ends at Ludwigsburg's S-Bahn platforms.

=== Freiberg Bietigheim–Bissingen line ===
The now abandoned northern route of the Little Murr railway ran from Freiberg further to the west. The A 81 autobahn now crosses over the line on a bridge and near Bietigheimer Wilhelmshof and the line runs for 4 km through deposits of glacial debris in cuttings up to 13 m deep. These cuttings were at the time of its construction the deepest of their kind in Württemberg. After crossing the line from Stuttgart, the Little Murr line ended on the west side of Bietigheim station.

== History ==
=== Background and Planning ===
After the opening of the Württemberg railway lines in the internal expansion of the 1860s (see History of railways in Württemberg), the cities of Stuttgart, Heilbronn, Crailsheim and Aalen were connected by a railway that spanned the northern part of the country. In 1853, the first east–west route through Württemberg was completed as the Western and Eastern Railways. Additional connections to Bavaria were added with the Rems Railway in 1863 and the Kocher Railway to Crailsheim in 1867, which was connected to the Bavarian railways in 1875. To improve links through the area spanned by the square of lines that had been opened, a line was proposed from Waiblingen on the Rems Railway to Schwäbisch Hall on the Kocher Railway. Together with the Gäu Railway, this would create a northeast–southwest line through Württemberg, running through Stuttgart.

In a speech the Württemberg Minister of Transport, Karl von Varnbüler announced on 28 April 1865 that the Murr Valley Railway would be built from Waiblingen to Schwäbisch Hall with a branch from Backnang to Bietigheim. The Backnang–Bietigheim line came to have a high strategic importance as a through route. The plan was welcomed in many petitions from the communities on the route, but the town of Marbach in 1864 and 1865 called for a railway connection from Marbach to Bietigheim or Ludwigsburg.

After the Franco-Prussian War of 1870-1871 and the subsequent Unification of Germany, construction of the Backnang-Bietigheim line was sought by the national government for military-strategic reasons. In Bietigheim a connection had previously been planned north of the station, which would have meant that trains running in an east–west direction would have had to reverse in the station. To allow troops to be speedily transported in the east–west direction from northern Bavaria to the French border, the plans were adjusted so that the line ran in a curve from the south to reach Bietigheim station via an underpass under the railway from Stuttgart. Since the entrance building was built on an island between the tracks of the Northern and Western Railway, a complete renovation of Bietigheim station was considered.

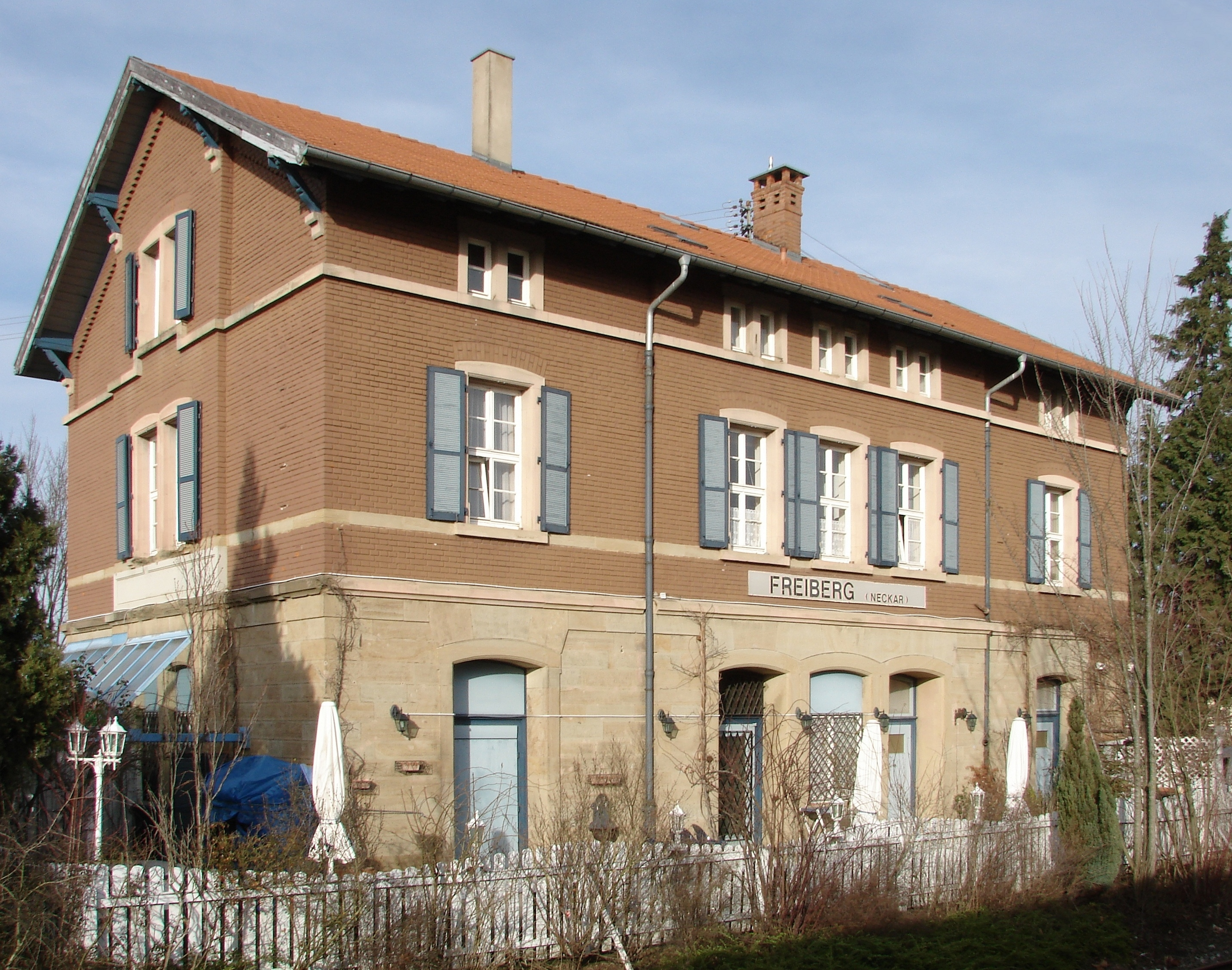
Freiberg station (Jan 2008)

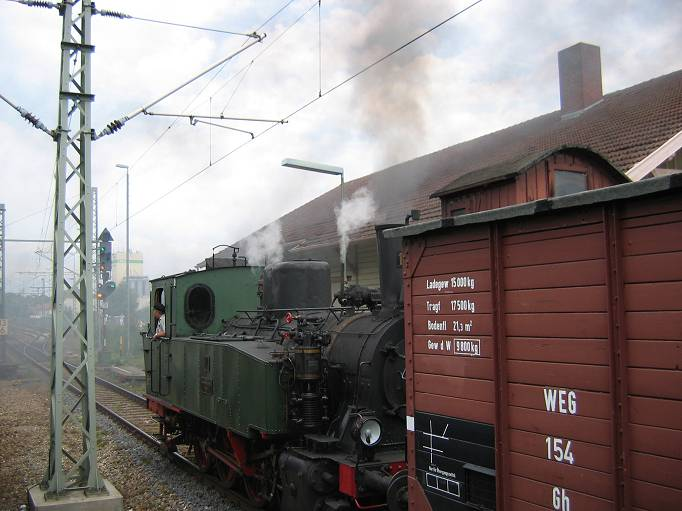
Locomotive 11 of the GES with a museum train in Marbach (June 2004)

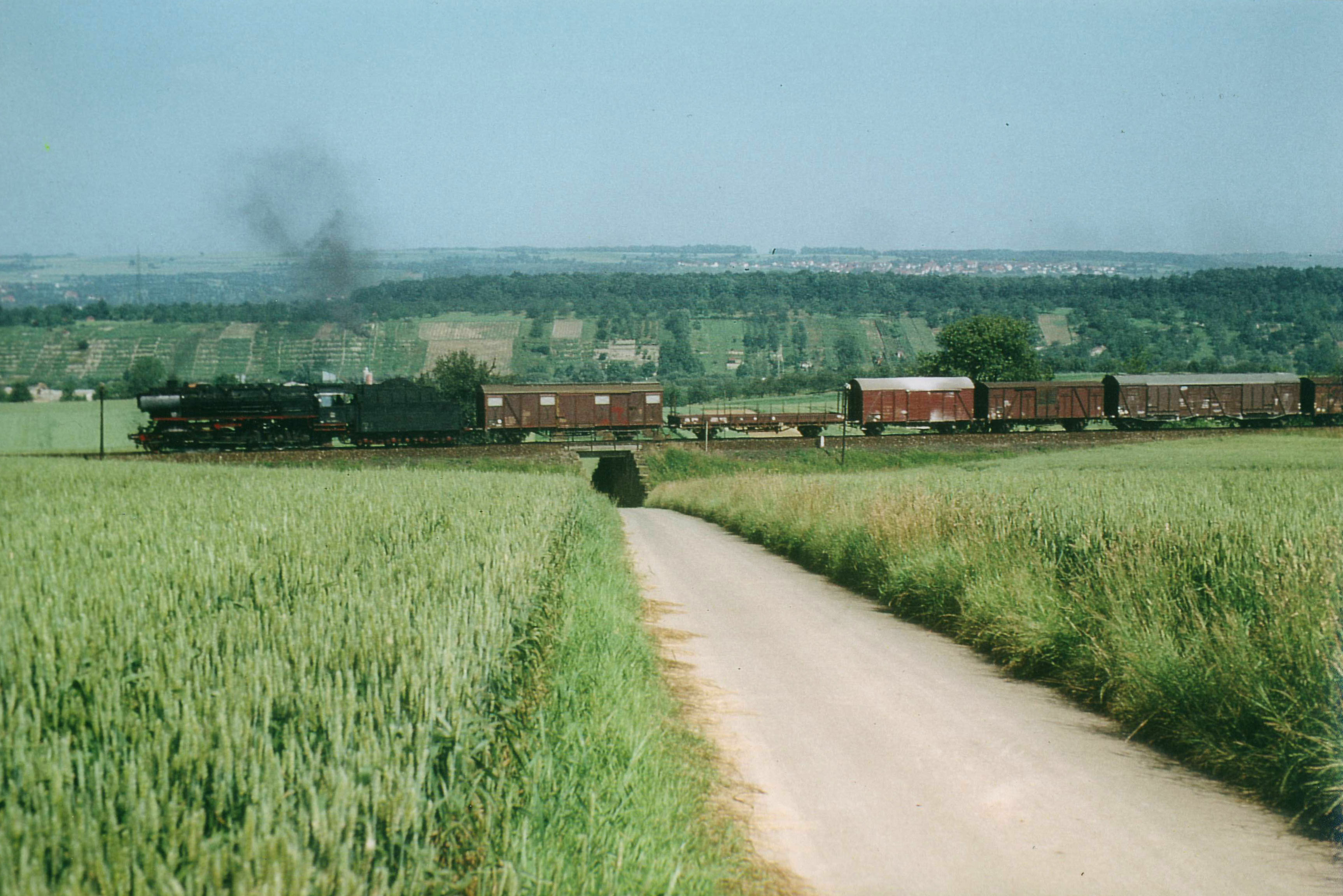
Steam freight train between Freiberg am Neckar and Benningen, 1972

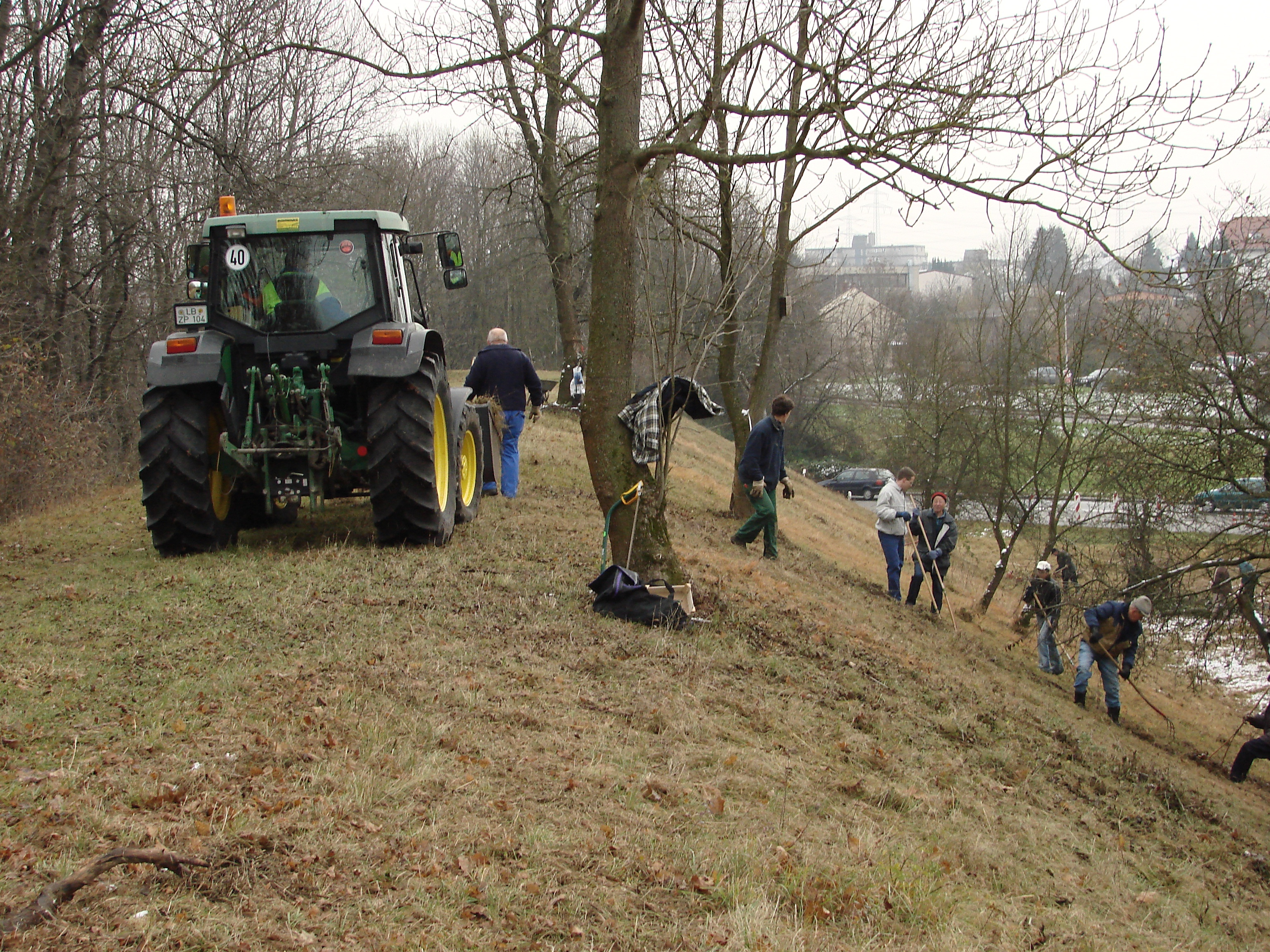
Maintenance of old embankment on abandoned Freiberg–Bietigheim line in Freiberg

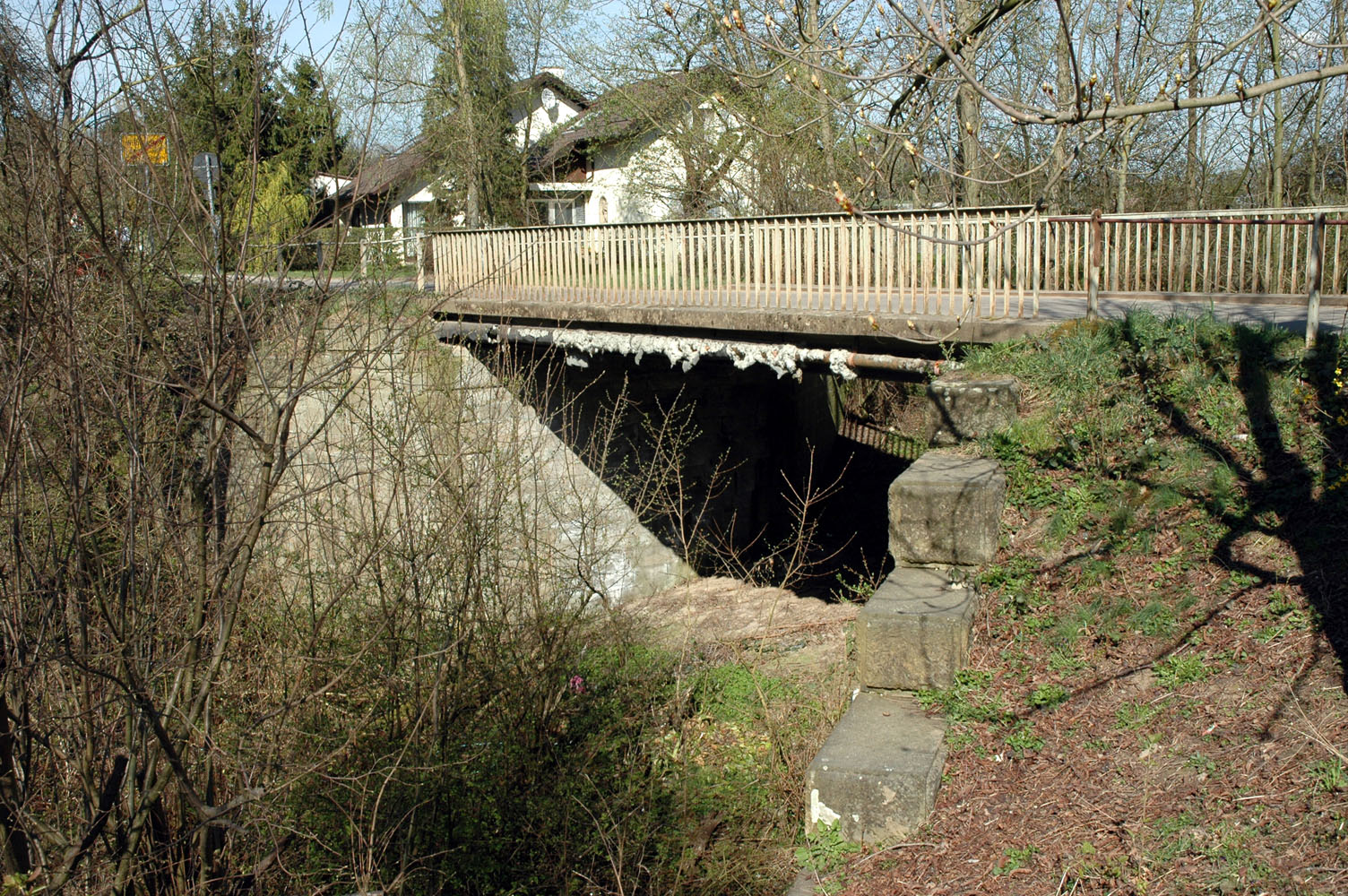
Road bridge over the former route in Bietigheim-Bissinger Wilhelmshof (April 2007)

With the impending agreement to build the Kraichgau Railway between Eppingen and Heilbronn, Württemberg was faced with an unfavourable situation in that the Kraichgau and the Kocher Railway were emerging as a new transport corridor between the Rhine and Bavaria, with only a relatively short section through Württemberg. The planned Murr Valley Railway would be competitive with this route if an additional northern bypass was built around the highly congested Stuttgart station, connecting the Murr and the Western Railways. An alternative bypass route with access to the Western Railway would have been the Untertürkheim–Kornwestheim freight bypass, which had not yet been built; it was planned from 1890 and opened in 1896.

In addition, to the west of the proposed crossing of the Neckar, a 5 km long branch line would be built to Ludwigsburg to improve connections between Marbach and the Bottwar Valley to Ludwigsburg and Stuttgart. Construction of the Murr Valley Railway from Hall to Backnang with the two branches to Waiblingen and to Bietigheim were authorised under an order of 22 March 1873. A few months later, on 29 December 1873, the Württemberg and Baden governments signed an agreement for the construction of the Kraichgau Railway to Heilbronn.

=== Construction of the Backnang–Bietigheim line ===
An order of 19 June 1874 released funds that enabled the construction of the Backnang–Bietigheim line to begin. Construction camps were established in Backnang, Marbach and Bietigheim and a construction headquarters was established in Marbach. The entire route was built as a single-track main line, but the line was prepared for eventual duplication.

During the construction of the line there were some significant problems: cuttings of up to 13 m deep—the deepest in Württemberg—were needed through glacial moraine between Beihingen-Heutingsheim and Bietigheim. The moraine was highly saturated and was subject to water seepage and landslides. Three fountains were built to dispose of the water and were used to supply Bietigheim station. Some animal remains ablated by Ice Age glaciation was found in the excavated earth. The most complex structure in the stretch was the Neckar Viaduct at Marbach, which was built as a five-span steel truss bridge with a total length of 345 m.

Trains began running on the Backnang–Bietigheim line on 8 December 1879. The rebuilding of Bietigheim station made it the second largest in Württemberg. The Murr Valley Railway was completed on 5 May 1880, so this new east–west axis was open before the completion of the Kraichgau Railway on 7 August 1880.

=== Construction of the Beihingen Heutingsheim-Ludwigsburg line ===
The construction of the Beihingen–Heutingsheim–Ludwigsburg branch line was authorised in 1870, but construction was delayed first due to Württemberg's difficult financial situation, increasing wages for construction workers as a result of skill shortages and the lack of profitability of the Württemberg Railways. An order of 25 August 1879 made available the necessary funds, which could also be used for a partial reconstruction of Ludwigsburg station. The only station on the line is at Favoritepark halt. The single track railway was opened on 15 October 1881 and the reconstruction of Ludwigsburg station was completed in 1883.

=== Further development ===
Although the Ludwigsburg line was opened later, its role grew significantly in the following years: in 1894, the opening of the Bottwar Valley Railway (Bottwartalbahn) produced passenger traffic from the Bottwar Valley to Stuttgart and in 1918 the opening of the marshalling yard in Kornwestheim meant that freight traffic ran on the Franconia–Hessental–Backnang–Kornwestheim route.

After Deutsche Reichsbahn took over the facilities of the Royal Württemberg State Railways in 1921, the original constrained stations at Backnang, Burgstall, Marbach and Ludwigsburg were expanded. This was accompanied by the duplication of the Favoritepark–Ludwigsburg line.

Due to its strategic importance as an east–west axis, the line was the repeated target of Allied air attacks at the end of the Second World War. On a Sunday morning in the spring of 1945, a freight train running towards Bietigheim through Beihingen (now part of Freiberg am Neckar) was covered with bombs by a fighter-bomber and destroyed. The deep cuttings near Bietigheim were also badly damaged by bombs. On 20 April 1945 all railway and road bridges over the Neckar and the Neckar canal were destroyed by retreating German troops. In addition, on 20 April 1945 German troops blew up the bridge over the Reichsautobahn (now the A 81 autobahn). The Neckar Viaduct at Marbach was repaired and reopened in 1947. Deutsche Bundesbahn occasionally considered the reconstruction of the Freiberg–Bietigheim line, but decided against it because of low traffic forecasts, caused particularly by the shift of the primary traffic flow from east–west to north–south. After the route had previously been partially dismantled, it was formally closed on 15 January 1958.

The formation of the town of Freiberg am Neckar from the communities of Beihingen, Heutingsheim and Geisingen led to Beihingen-Heutingsheim station being renamed Freiberg (Neckar) on 1 June 1975.

=== Electrification and integration into the S-Bahn network ===
Two years after operations commenced on Stuttgart S-Bahn lines S1, S5 and S6 in 1978, the Backnang–Ludwigsburg line experienced a significant upswing with the extension of the S-Bahn line on 27 September 1980. Since then, line S4 services have operated between Ludwigsburg and Marbach. Extensive construction work was required ahead of the introduction of regular-interval timetables. The Neckar Viaduct at Marbach was replaced by a modern bridge, part of the Benningen–Favoritepark section was duplicated, a flying junction was built in Ludwigsburg and the section was electrified. Passenger services between Marbach and Backnang continued to be operated with diesel-hauled trains.

With the financial support of the state of Baden-Württemberg, which provided half of the cost, electrification of the remaining section of the Backnang–Ludwigsburg line and the Murr line between Backnang and Crailsheim began on 12 September 1994. After the completion of the work it on 2 June 1996, it was possible for electrically hauled freight trains to run directly from Kornwestheim marshalling yard to Nuremberg. Compared to the existing route via the Schuster Railway to Untertürkheim yard, where trains had to reverse (with the locomotive running around) in order to continue on the Rems line, the new route accelerated freight trains by 35 minutes.

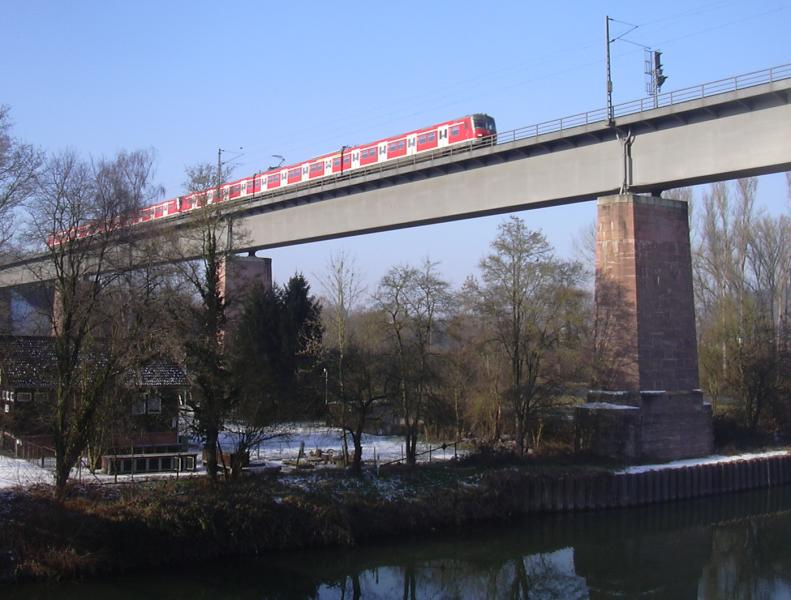
S-Bahn EMU on the Marbach Neckar Viaduct (January 2006)

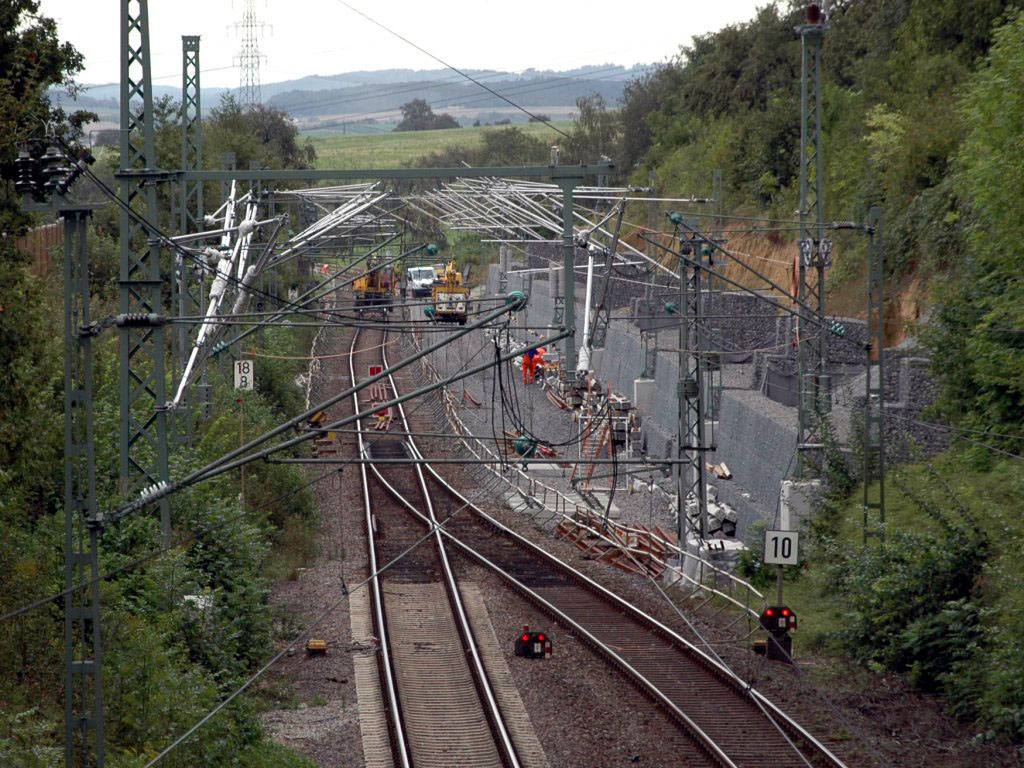
Work on the duplication in Freiberg (September 2009)

S-Bahn line S4 has been extended from Marbach to Backnang, replacing Regionalbahn services. To create this S-Bahn ring, the Freiberg–Benningen section needed to be duplicated. This work began in December 2005.

In July 2008 the participating municipalities and districts signed an agreement to finance the extension between Marbach and Backnang. This allowed the S-Bahn extension to open on 8 December 2012. The total estimated cost of the works for the extension of the S-Bahn amounted to almost €40 million.

== Operations ==
The Backnang–Bietigheim route was originally built as part of an east–west axis for freight transport. To a much lesser extent there were also long-distance passenger services on the east–west route: for example, in the summer 1914 timetable an express train (D-Zug, a fast and luxurious express using carriages with compartments and having a corridor) ran from Cheb (then a largely German speaking city called Eger) to Bietigheim with some of its coaches running from Nuremberg to Paris and a fast train (S-Zug, slower and less luxurious than a D-Zug and using carriages with compartments but having no corridor) from Hof to Bietigheim, with through coaches from Nuremberg to Luxembourg and Trier. These trains use this line to bypass Stuttgart Hauptbahnhof. From 1931, an express service ran for two years on this line between Nuremberg and Strasbourg with through coaches from Prague to Paris.

Until the early 1960s, passenger trains were hauled by steam locomotives of class 75.0 (Württemberg T 5) and 93.5 (Prussian T 14.1). After the phasing out of these locomotives they were replaced by Einheitsdampflokomotive ("standard steam locomotives") of class 64 and 86 based in Stuttgart until the mid-1960s. These were replaced by class 212 diesel locomotives based at Kornwestheim.

In September 1980, the S-Bahn S4 opened between Marbach and Stuttgart-Schwabstraße. The original 20-minute interval service was increased to a 15-minute interval service in 1996. The S-Bahn service uses class 420 electric multiple units.

Until 8 December 2008, services on the eastern section Regionalbahn ran from Marbach to Backnang during peak hours at 30-minute interval and hourly at other times. On Saturdays Regionalbahn trains ran hourly. These used a class BR 426 electric multiple unit. The additional service in the peaks used a class BR 110.3 with three Silberling carriages. On Sundays the places between Marbach and Backnang were served only by bus.

Since 8 December 2012, S-Bahn line S 4 has served the whole route on weekdays until 8 pm at 30-minute intervals. After 8 pm and on weekends, it operates hourly.

Since the electrification of the route in 1996, freight services have also run between Kornwestheim and Nuremberg and it is now not necessary for electrically hauled freight trains to run via the Schuster line and reverse in Untertürkheim yard.
