= Marbach (Neckar) station =

Railway station in Marbach am Neckar, Germany

Marbach (Neckar)
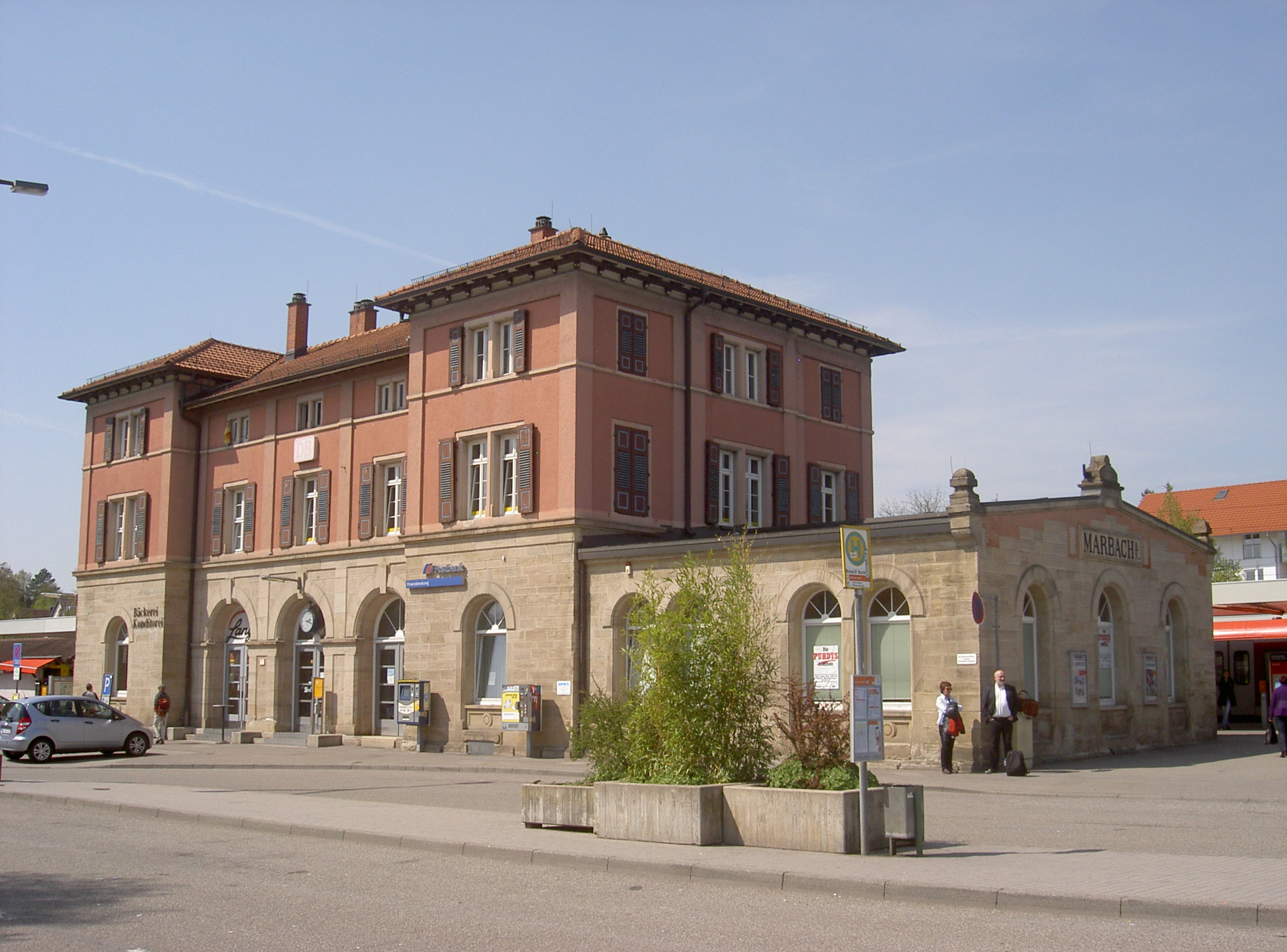

General information
- Location: Bahnhofstr. 13, Marbach am Neckar, Baden-Württemberg; Germany
- Coordinates: 48°56′37″N 9°15′52″E
- Owner: DB Netz
- Operator: DB Station&Service
- Lines: Backnang–Ludwigsburg railway (KBS 790.31, KBS 790.4); Bottwar Valley Railway (mostly closed)
- Platforms: 1 island platform 1 side platform
- Tracks: 3
- Train operators: S-Bahn Stuttgart

Construction
- Accessible: Yes

Other information
- Station code: 3941
- DS100 code: TMB
- IBNR: 8003853
- Category: 4
- Fare zone: : 3 and 4
- Website: www.bahnhof.de

History
- Opened: 8 December 1879

Services
Preceding station	Stuttgart S-Bahn	Following station
Benningen (Neckar) towards Schwabstraße	S4	Erdmannhausen towards Backnang
Location

Marbach (Neckar) station serves the town of Marbach in the German state of Baden-Württemberg. It is the terminus for line S 4 of the Stuttgart S-Bahn and Regionalbahn trains from Backnang. Until 1966, this was the starting point of the Bottwar Valley Railway (Bottwartalbahn), which ran all the way to Heilbronn Süd station.

== History ==
The Backnang–Bietigheim line was built by the Royal Württemberg State Railways as part of a new east–west link from the Bavarian border at Crailsheim to the Baden border at Mühlacker. The town council of Marbach had long petitioned the government for a connection to the railway network, which the new line would provide. Construction began in 1875. A huge iron truss viaduct with sandstone pillars was built over the Neckar valley between Marbach and Benningen. The station was built about half a kilometre northeast of the centre of the town. The station building, which is still preserved, was more impressive than the others on the line. The central building and its two side projections are three storeys high. The walls of the ground storey are built of sandstone and the upper storeys are brick. The freight shed, built at that time, also still exists.

On 8 December 1879, the railway line was taken into operation along with Marbach station. A short time later, the station was renamed Marbach (Neckar) to distinguish it from the station of Marbach (now in Villingen-Schwenningen) in Baden on the Black Forest Railway.

Passenger traffic on the line was initially moderate, but increased in 1881 with the completion of the connection between Beihingen (now part of Freiberg am Neckar) and Ludwigsburg. Beihingen-Heutingsheim was considered as a possible starting point of the Bottwar Valley Railway, but Marbach's advantages prevailed. The tracks of the narrow-gauge railway were on the northern side of the station. Its equipment included a turntable, a goods shed and a Rollbock facility for transferring standard gauge freight wagons. In 1894 the first trains ran to Beilstein and in 1900 the line was extended to Heilbronn Süd station. In 1906, a single storey extension was added to the station building on the eastern side to accommodate additional premises.

The largest crowd at the station was in June 1934 for the celebration of the 175th birthday of the poet and dramatist, Friedrich Schiller, who was born in the town. A special train, called the Schiller-Zug, brought thousands of visitors to the festival, theatrical events and parades. It was a major part of the National Socialist solstice celebrations, as Schiller was born on 10 November.

In the last days of World War II retreating troops of the Wehrmacht blew up the Neckar River viaduct. Air strikes inflicted heavy damage to the Beihingen-Heutingsheim–Bietigheim section of the line. The Marbach–Bietigheim line was never restored to operation, as its reconstruction was not considered worthwhile. On 29 September 1966, Deutsche Bundesbahn closed passenger services on the Bottwar Valley Railway. Although this line had once been one of the most heavily used narrow gauge railways in south western Germany, the trains were now replaced by buses. From 1968 freight traffic was abandoned north of Steinheim. The line to Steinheim and the branch line to Marbach power station were standardised.

In order to connect Marbach to the Stuttgart S-Bahn, the station was rebuilt and the line was electrified for the time being to Marbach. On 28 September 1980, S-Bahn line S 4 opened, allowing a direct connection to Stuttgart. In 1989, freight traffic was abandoned to Steinheim. Although the last section of the Bottwar Valley Railway to the junction with the line to the power station has never officially been closed, it is now overgrown by trees and shrubs.

From the end of 2012, Backnang replaced Marbach as the terminus of line S 4, making the Backnang–Ludwigsburg line passable again without changing trains. Deutsche Bahn rebuilt the line and the stations between Marbach and Backnang for this project from December 2005. A plan to reactivate the Bottwar Valley Railway from Marbach to Beilstein that emerged in the 1990s is opposed by the state of Baden-Wuerttemberg and the municipalities due to its high estimated cost and uncertain revenue.

== Operations ==
The station has two through tracks and a terminating track and is served by Stuttgart S-Bahn line S 4. S-Bahn services towards Ludwigsburg start on platform track 1. Track 2 is used by services towards Backnang. Marbach station is classified by Deutsche Bahn as a category 4 station.

Line	Route
S 4	Backnang – Marbach – Ludwigsburg – Zuffenhausen – Stuttgart North – Hauptbahnhof – Schwabstraße
