= Waiblingen station =

Railway station in Waiblingen, Germany

Waiblingen
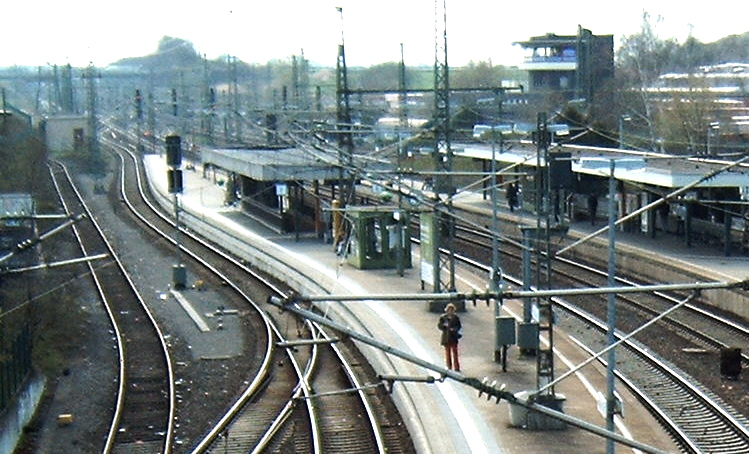
- Looking at the Rems line to the west.

General information
- Location: Neuer Bahnhof, Waiblingen, Baden-Württemberg; Germany
- Coordinates: 48°49′34″N 9°18′2″E
- Owner: Deutsche Bahn
- Operator: DB Netz; DB Station&Service
- Lines: Stuttgart–Nördlingen; Waiblingen–Schwäbisch Hall
- Platforms: 5

Construction
- Accessible: Yes

Other information
- Station code: 6471
- DS100 code: TWN
- IBNR: 8000180
- Category: 3
- Fare zone: : 2
- Website: www.bahnhof.de

History
- Opened: 25 July 1861

Services
Preceding station		Following station
Stuttgart-Bad Cannstatt towards Stuttgart Hbf	RE 90	Winnenden towards Nürnberg Hbf
Stuttgart-Bad Cannstatt towards Stuttgart Hbf	MEX 13	Schorndorf towards Crailsheim
Preceding station	DB Regio Baden-Württemberg	Following station
Stuttgart-Bad Cannstatt towards Stuttgart Hbf	MEX 19	Winnenden towards Schwäbisch Hall-Hessental or Crailsheim
Stuttgart-Bad Cannstatt towards Stuttgart Hbf	MEX 90	Winnenden towards Schwäbisch Hall-Hessental
Preceding station	Stuttgart S-Bahn	Following station
Fellbach towards Filderstadt	S2	Rommelshausen towards Schorndorf
Fellbach towards Flughafen/Messe	S3	Neustadt-Hohenacker towards Backnang
Location

Waiblingen station is a railway station in the city of Waiblingen in the German state of Baden-Württemberg. The station is located at the junction of the Stuttgart-Bad Cannstatt–Nördlingen railway and the Waiblingen–Schwäbisch Hall railway.

== History ==
=== The first station building ===
The first station in Waiblingen was built in 1861 during the construction of the Rems Railway. This building still exists; it is about 200 m east of the present station and serves as a residence. Immediately east of it there was a level crossing of Mayenner Straße over the Rems Railway; this was replaced by an underpass at the end of the 1960s.

=== Second station building ===
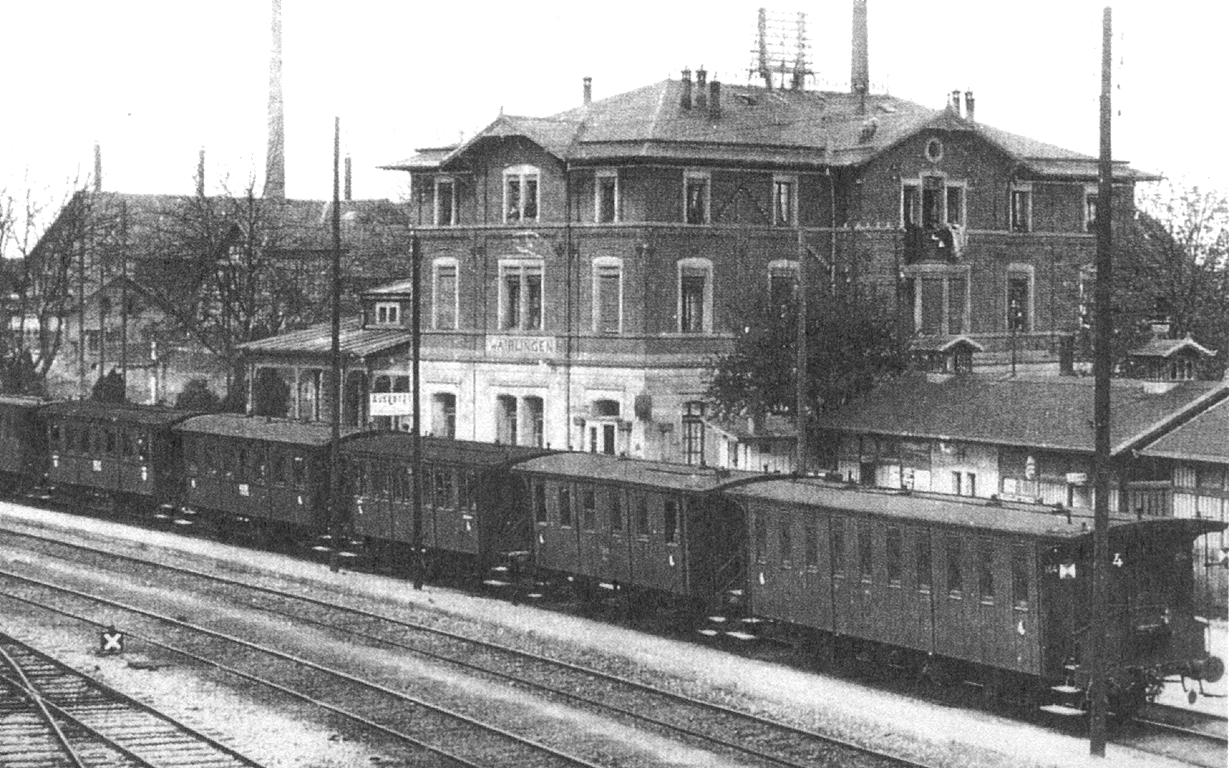
Second station building, ca. 1900

With the construction of the Murr Railway in 1876, the station had to be completely rebuilt at the junction of the lines as a Keilbahnhof ("wedge station"). The station building was located slightly east of the current station. It was a two-story building, similar in style to Winnenden station. It was demolished in preparation for the extension of the Stuttgart S-Bahn in 1979.

=== Third station building ===
The current entrance building was opened in 1980 in preparation for the opening of S-Bahn lines S2 and S3 in 1981. This building no longer had direct access to the platforms; instead a busway with stops for city and regional bus services runs next to the platforms. Also, the station forecourt was reduced to provide a large park-and-ride space. Along with the entrance buildings at Stuttgart-Zuffenhausen (opened in 1982) and Ludwigsburg (opened in 1992), it is one of only a few new station buildings that replaced an old station building in Württemberg once the reconstruction of damaged stations after World War II had been completed.

Its last major modernisation was carried out in early 2008, when the kiosk and restaurant facilities built in 1980 were replaced by a modern kiosk and a bakery. In 2009, the station was adapted for disabled access.

== Station layout ==
Waiblingen station includes the following platform tracks:

- track 1: Murr line to Stuttgart
- track 2: for freight/through traffic (cambered track)
- track 3: Murr line to Schwäbisch Hall,
- track 4: a former terminating track for suburban services to Stuttgart, closed in 1980
- track 5: Rems line to Stuttgart,
- track 6: Rems line to Stuttgart or Aalen (reversible) and through traffic
- track 7: Rems line to Aalen. The platform between track 6 and track 7 is designed as an island platform.

== Operations ==
Waiblingen station is served by S-Bahn trains on lines S2 and S3 of the Stuttgart S-Bahn and regional services. Long-distance services generally do not stop in Waiblingen.

=== Regional services ===
MEX 13	Stuttgart Hbf – Waiblingen – Schorndorf – Schwäbisch Gmünd – Aalen (– Ellwangen – Crailsheim)	30 mins (60 mins to Ellwangen, 120 mins to Crailsheim)
MEX 19	Stuttgart – Waiblingen – Backnang – Gaildorf West (– Schwäbisch Hall-Hessental – Crailsheim)	60 mins (Mon–Fri only, afternoons to Schwäbisch Hall, some trains to Crailsheim)
MEX 90	Stuttgart – Waiblingen – Backnang – Gaildorf West – Schwäbisch Hall-Hessental (– Crailsheim)	120 mins (in the peak to Crailsheim)
RE 90	Stuttgart – Waiblingen – Backnang – Schwäbisch Hall-Hessental – Crailsheim – Ansbach – Nuremberg Hbf	120 mins

=== S-Bahn ===
Line	Route
S 2	Schorndorf – Weinstadt (Endersbach)– Waiblingen – Bad Cannstatt – Hauptbahnhof – Schwabstraße – Vaihingen – Rohr – Stuttgart Flughafen/Messe – Filderstadt (extra trains in the peak between Schorndorf and Vaihingen.)
S 3	Backnang – Winnenden – Waiblingen – Bad Cannstatt – Hauptbahnhof – Vaihingen – Rohr – Flughafen/Messe (extra trains in the peak between Backnang and Vaihingen).
