= Ludwigsburg station =

Railway station in Ludwigsburg, Germany

Ludwigsburg
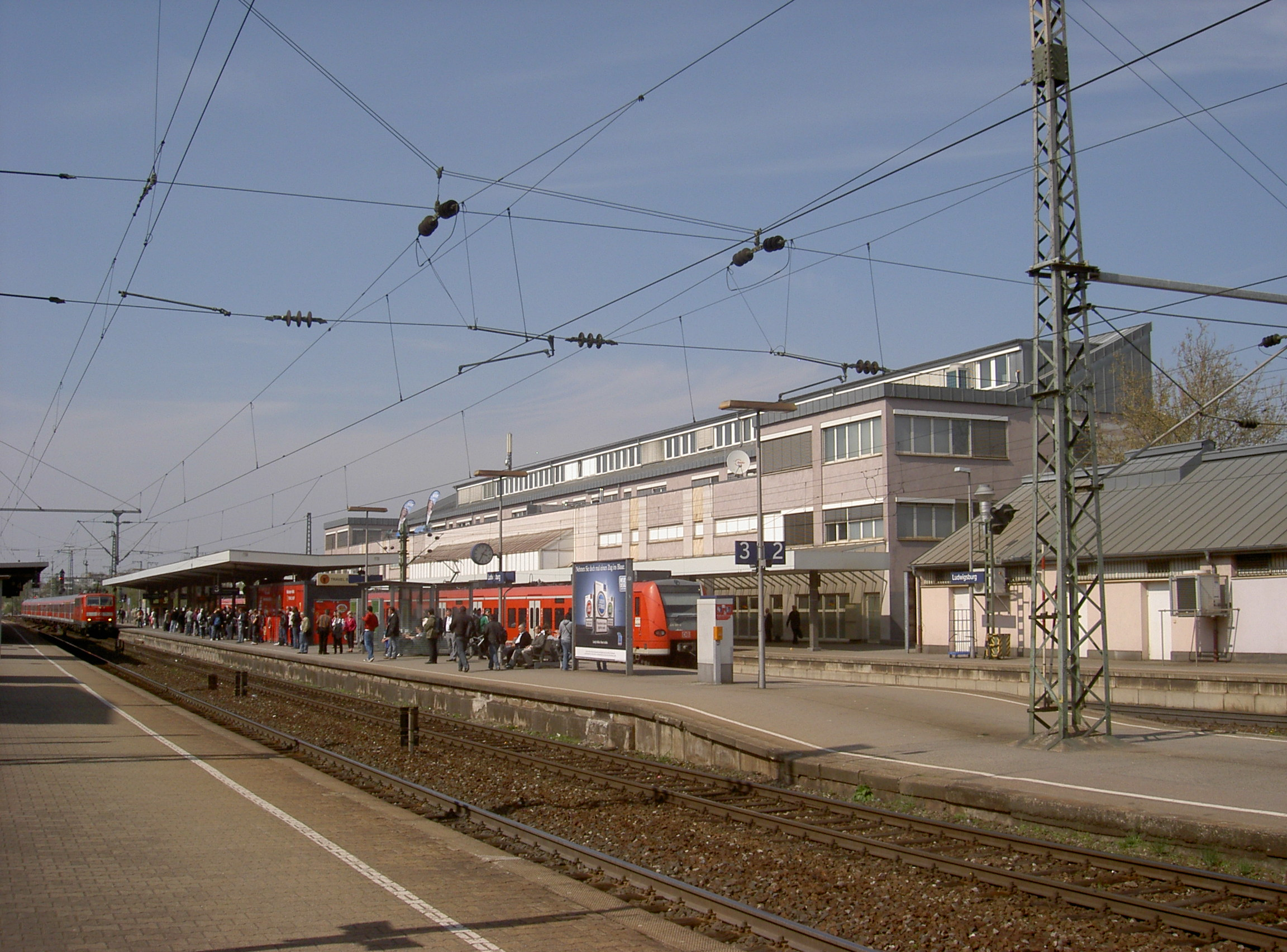

General information
- Location: Bahnhofstr.10; Ludwigsburg, Baden-Württemberg; Germany
- Coordinates: 48°53′32″N 9°11′7″E
- Owner: DB Netz
- Operator: DB Station&Service
- Lines: Franconia Railway (KBS 780, KBS 790.5); Backnang–Ludwigsburg railway (KBS 790.4); access track to Kornwestheim marshalling yard; Ludwigsburg–Markgröningen railway (closed)
- Platforms: 5

Construction
- Accessible: Yes

Other information
- Station code: 3833
- DS100 code: TLU
- Category: 3
- Fare zone: : 2
- Website: www.bahnhof.de

History
- Opened: 15 October 1846; 179 years ago
- Electrified: 15 May 1933; 93 years ago

Services
Preceding station		Following station
Stuttgart Hbf Terminus	RE 8	Bietigheim-Bissingen towards Würzburg Hbf
Preceding station	(Stuttgart)	Following station
Stuttgart Hbf towards Tübingen Hbf	MEX 12	Bietigheim-Bissingen towards Mosbach-Neckarelz
Bietigheim-Bissingen towards Karlsruhe Hbf or Bad Wildbad	MEX 17a	Stuttgart Hbf Terminus
Bietigheim-Bissingen towards Bruchsal	MEX 17c	Stuttgart Hbf Terminus
Stuttgart Hbf towards Tübingen Hbf	MEX 18	Bietigheim-Bissingen towards Osterburken
Preceding station	Stuttgart S-Bahn	Following station
Kornwestheim towards Schwabstraße	S4	Favoritepark towards Backnang
Kornwestheim towards Schwabstraße	S5	Asperg towards Bietigheim-Bissingen
Location

Ludwigsburg station is in Ludwigsburg in the German state of Baden-Württemberg on the Franconia Railway and the Backnang–Bietigheim line. It is served by regional trains and the Stuttgart S-Bahn. Until 2005 the Ludwigsburg–Markgröningen line also connected to the station. In addition, it has a direct link with Stuttgart's main marshalling yard at Kornwestheim.

== History ==
From the beginning of the planning for the Central Railway (German: Centralbahn), a station was planned for the Residenzstadt (city with a royal palace) of Ludwigsburg. Construction began in 1844 and affected several parts of the Ludwigsburg district. A portion of the Lerchenholz hill had to be removed. The site of the former Schafhofseen (lake) had to be filled in. Ludwigsburg station had a two-storey entrance building and a locomotive depot.

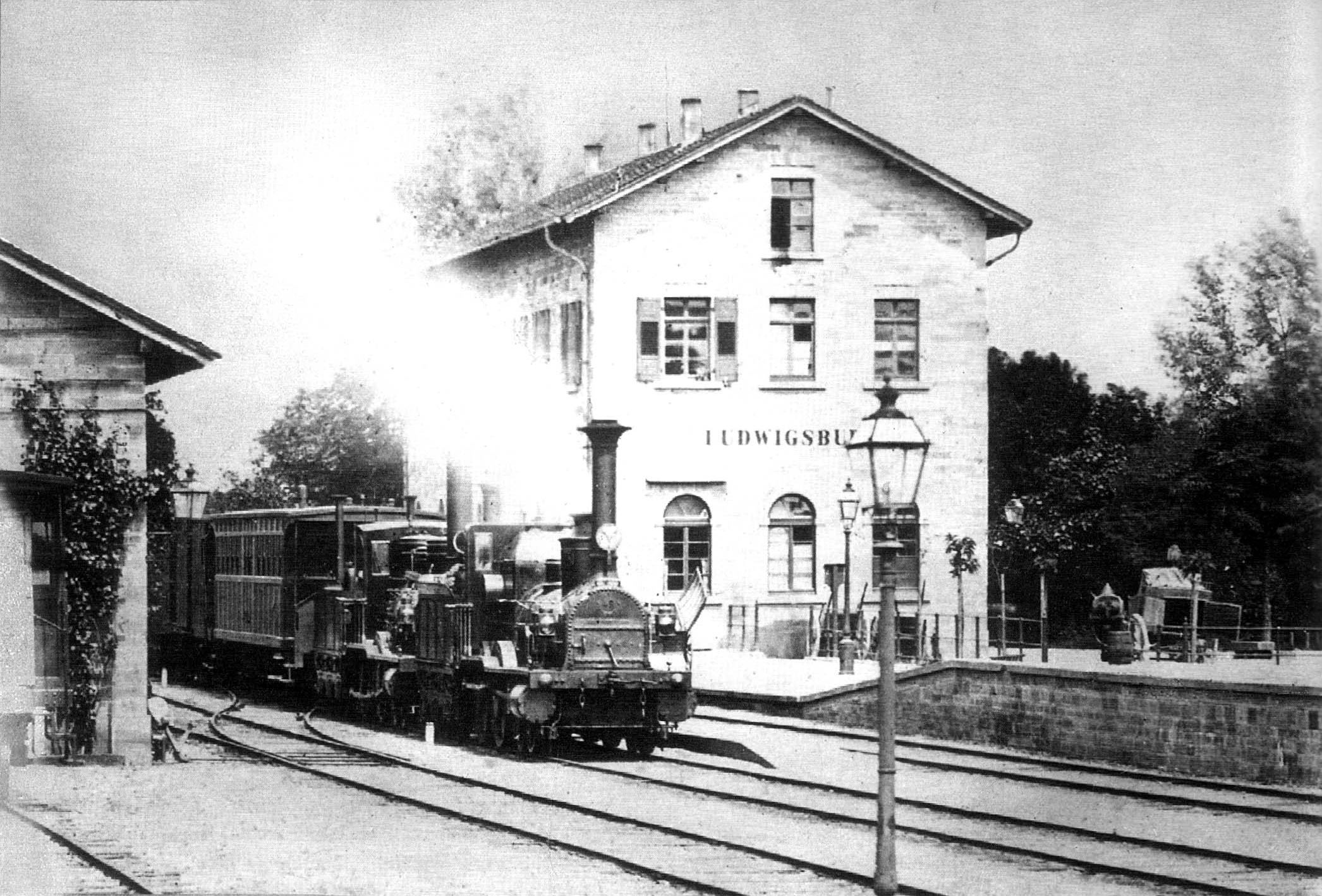
Ludwigsburg station in 1860

On 5 October 1846 the first train ran to Ludwigsburg. The stops between Stuttgart and Ludwigsburg were not served by the Royal Württemberg State Railways until ten days later. The inauguration ceremony for the new line was held in Stuttgart. The Ludwigsburg city council took no part in it.

Unfortunately for the locals the station was in a very unfavourable position. Due to the swampy area around the Feuersee (lake) there was only a narrow track that was very difficult to use in rain or snow. Carts could only approach the station via Solitudestraße and Leonbergerstraße. A direct road link had to be created as soon as possible. But the Government did not have the finances to achieve this.

The construction continued on the Northern Railway. A year later, on 11 October 1847, the next section was completed and trains ran to Bietigheim. In 1852 the State Railways opened a second track on the line from Stuttgart to Bietigheim. In the 1860s another floor was added to the station building along with two wings. The southern wing was a building for mail handling, the north one was a waiting room. A loading dock existed for freight and military traffic. At the time there were five tracks running through the station. A sixth track was added as siding in 1868 to serve the factory of Heinrich Franck & Sons, which produced a coffee substitute from chicory.

After ten years of construction, the road between Wilhelmsplatz (now Schillerplatz) and the station was completed in 1869. Eisenbahnstraße (railway street) was a short time later renamed Myliusstraße after General Ferdinand von Mylius who was considered the founder of the costly street. Stately buildings were built along the street and Bahnhofsvorplatz (station forecourt) such as the railway hotel (1870s), the general post office (1886) and the music hall (1890).

On 15 October 1881 the State Railway opened the railway line between Ludwigsburg and Beihingen (now part of Freiberg am Neckar), connecting to the Backnang–Bietigheim line. Three terminating tracks were built on the north side of the entrance building to cater for the resulting traffic.

From 1910 to 1926 the station forecourt was the starting point of the Ludwigsburg Overhead Line Railway (Ludwigsburger Oberleitungs-Bahn), an early trolleybus operation. A branch line to Markgröningen was opened on 4 December 1916. The building of two additional tracks between Stuttgart and Ludwigsburg was completed in 1929. On 15 May 1933, electrification of two tracks to Stuttgart was completed and suburban services began to operate on the line.

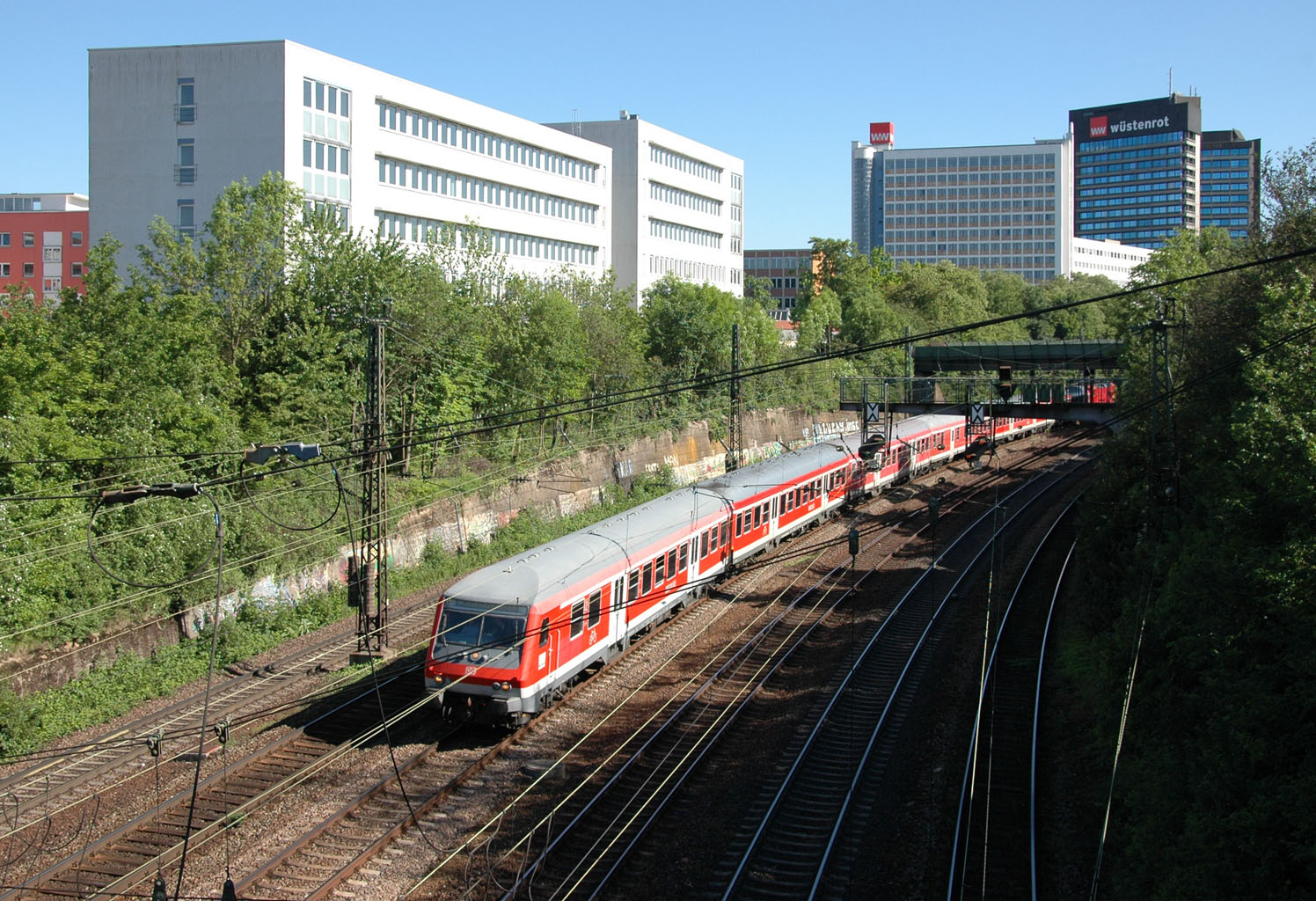
South end of Ludwigsburg station with the Wüstenrot Tower in the background

On 28 September 1975 Deutsche Bundesbahn closed passenger operations on the line to Markgröningen due to lack of passengers. From the mid-1970s tracks in the station area were modified as part of the introduction of Stuttgart S-Bahn operations. The junction between the Northern Railway and the line to Backnang is now grade separated. The terminating tracks north of the station were built over.

Despite an extensive renovation of the station and the waiting room in the 1950s, the station was outdated and still unpopular with some of the population. Its demolition in favour of a new building began in October 1987. It was one of a small number of stations that had survived World War II to be demolished and replaced in Württemberg. After several planning delays the groundbreaking ceremony for a new building took place in June 1991. The new building combines the station with a shopping centre. It was opened on 19 November 1992.

== Operations ==
The station has five platform tracks. Regional trains stop at track 1 running towards Bietigheim. Track 2 is used by S-Bahn services to Bietigheim or Marbach. S-Bahn services towards Zuffenhausen run on track 3. Track 4 is used by regional trains to Stuttgart. Track 5 is not used by scheduled services.

Long-distance services do not stop at Ludwigsburg. The station is classified by Deutsche Bahn as a category 3 station.

=== Regional services ===
Line		Operator	Frequency
RE 1	Stuttgart – (Ludwigsburg – Bietigheim –) Vaihingen – Mühlacker – Pforzheim – Karlsruhe-Durlach – Karlsruhe	Go-Ahead BW	2 train pairs
RE 8	Stuttgart – Ludwigsburg – Bietigheim – Heilbronn – Bad Friedrichshall – Osterburken – Lauda – Würzburg	Go-Ahead BW	Hourly
MEX 12	Tübingen – Reutlingen – Plochingen – Esslingen – Stuttgart – Ludwigsburg – Bietigheim – Heilbronn (– Mosbach-Neckarelz)	SWEG Bahn Stuttgart	Hourly
MEX 17a	Stuttgart – Ludwigsburg – Bietigheim – Vaihingen (Enz) – Mühlacker – Pforzheim	SWEG Bahn Stuttgart	Hourly (together RB17C to Mühlacker)
MEX 17c	Stuttgart – Ludwigsburg – Bietigheim – Vaihingen (Enz) – Mühlacker – Bretten – Bruchsal	SWEG Bahn Stuttgart	Hourly (together with RB17A to Mühlacker)
MEX 18	Stuttgart – Ludwigsburg – Bietigheim – Heilbronn – Neckarsulm – Bad Friedrichshall – Möckmühl – Osterburken	SWEG Bahn Stuttgart	Hourly

=== S-Bahn ===
Line	Route
S 4	Backnang – Marbach – Ludwigsburg – Zuffenhausen – Hauptbahnhof – Schwabstraße
S 5	Bietigheim – Ludwigsburg – Zuffenhausen – Hauptbahnhof – Schwabstraße
