= Schwaikheim =

- Municipality
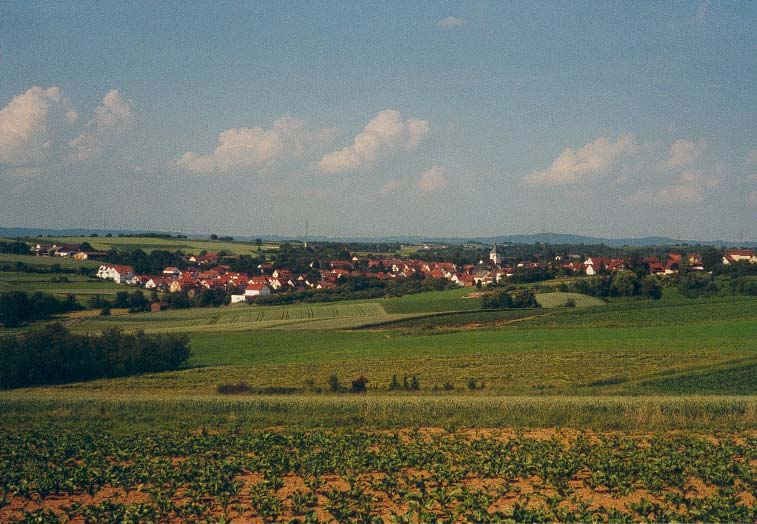
- View of the town

- Coat of arms

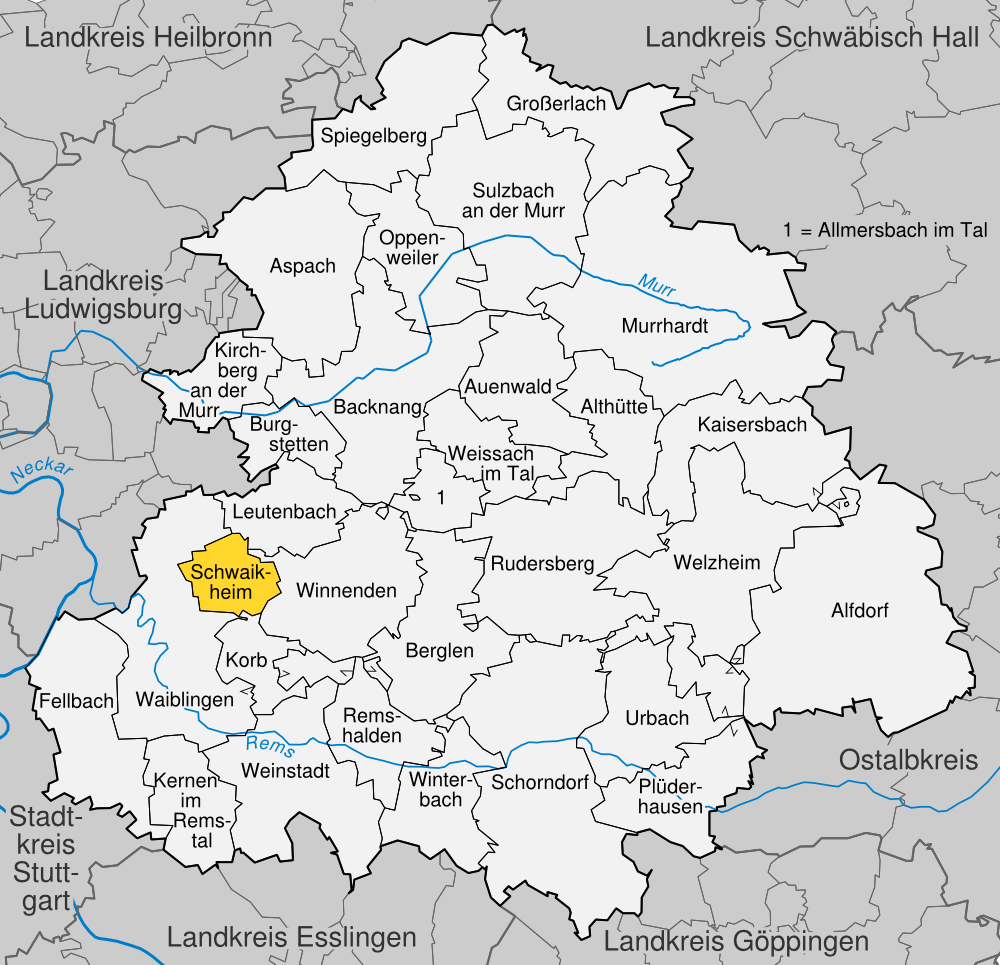
- Location of Schwaikheim within Rems-Murr-Kreis district
- Interactive map of Schwaikheim
- Location within Germany Location within Baden-Württemberg
- Coordinates: 48°52′17″N 09°21′11″E
- Country: Germany
- State: Baden-Württemberg
- Admin. region: Stuttgart
- District: Rems-Murr-Kreis

Government
  - Mayor (2021–29): Astrid Loff

Area
  - Total: 9.22 km^{2} (3.56 sq mi)
- Elevation: 276 m (906 ft)

Population (2025-12-31)
  - Total: 9,934
  - Density: 1,080/km^{2} (2,790/sq mi)
- Time zone: UTC+01:00 (CET)
  - Summer (DST): UTC+02:00 (CEST)
- Postal codes: 71409
- Dialling codes: 07195
- Vehicle registration: WN / BK
- Website: www.schwaikheim.de

Schwaikheim is a municipality in the district of Rems-Murr in Baden-Württemberg in Germany.
