= Waiblingen–Schwäbisch Hall railway =

Railway line in Germany

Waiblingen–Schwäbisch Hall-Hessental railway or Murr Railway
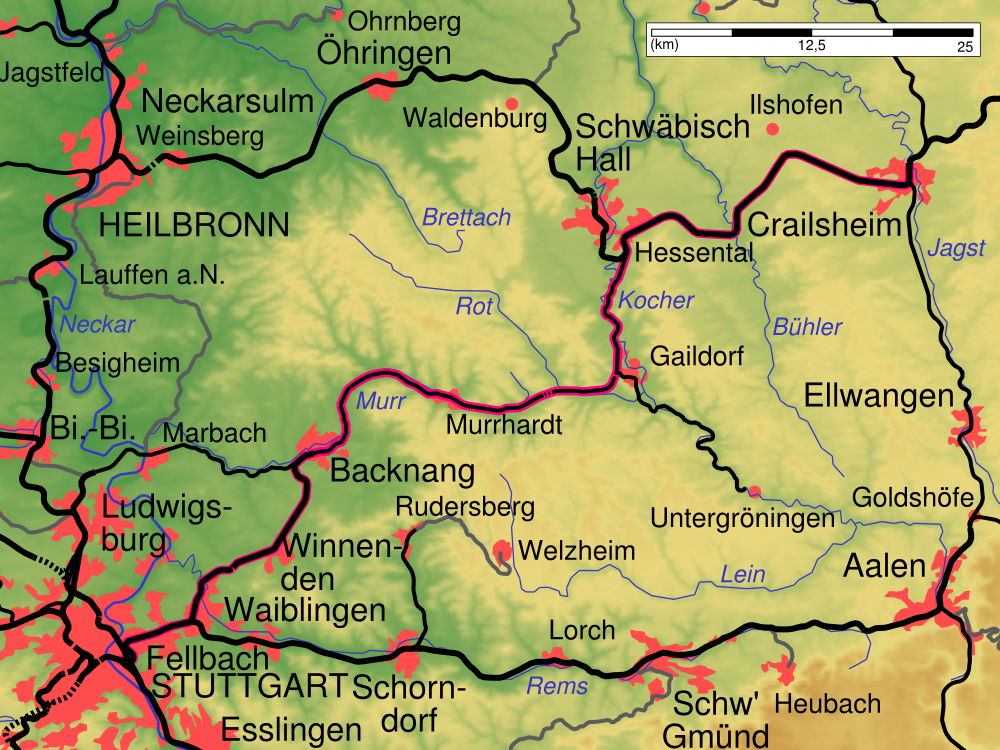

Overview
- Native name: Murrbahn
- Line number: 4930
- Locale: Baden-Württemberg, Germany

Service
- Route number: 785 (784 until 2007); 790.3 (S-Bahn)

Technical
- Line length: 60.696 km (37.715 mi)
- Number of tracks: 2 (Waiblingen–Backnang)
- Track gauge: 1,435 mm (4 ft 8 1/2 in) standard gauge
- Electrification: 15 kV/16.7 Hz AC; Overhead catenary

The Waiblingen–Schwäbisch Hall railway (also known in German as the Murrbahn—Murr Railway—or the Murrtalbahn—Murr Valley Railway) is a major railway in the German state of Baden-Württemberg and the shortest rail link between Stuttgart and Nuremberg.

It starts at Waiblingen and runs between Backnang and Fornsbach through the upper valley of the Murr. The Backnang–Ludwigsburg railway, known as the Kleine Murrbahn ("Little Murr Railway"), runs through the lower part of the Murr valley. The Murr Railway continues to Gaildorf on the Rot river, then to Schwäbisch Hall on the Kocher. There it connects with the Hohenlohe Railway from Crailsheim to Heilbronn.

The first section of the Murr Railway to Backnang is integrated with the Stuttgart S-Bahn as line S3. The section to Backnang is double track and the remaining line to Schwäbisch Hall-Hessental is single track.

== History ==
The Royal Württemberg State Railways built the Murr Valley Railway (Murrtalbahn) and the Gäu Railway (Gäubahn) from Stuttgart to Freudenstadt simultaneously, creating a diagonal line through Württemberg. Construction supervisor (Oberbaurat) Carl Julius Abel was responsible for planning and construction of the line. With it, the existing routes between Nuremberg and Stuttgart via Aalen or Heilbronn were shortened.

On 26 October 1876, the Waiblingen–Backnang section was opened, followed by the section Backnang–Murrhardt section on 11 April 1878 and the Hessental–Gaildorf section on 1 December 1879. On 15 May 1880, the gap between Murrhardt and Gaildorf was closed, which required the construction of two tunnels.

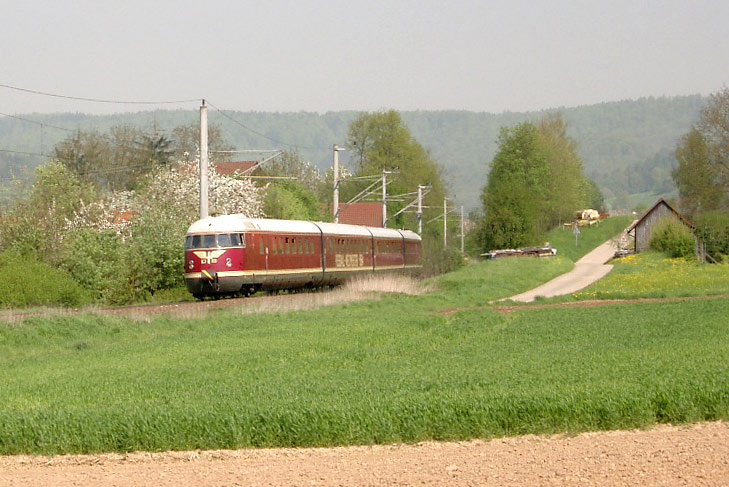
Train carrying German team for the 1954 World Cup near Oppenweiler-Zell

The original station in Waiblingen on the Murr line was closed and replaced by one just to the west as a junction station. The chosen route had a disadvantage for the city of Schwäbisch Hall, since the connection for the line between Stuttgart and Nuremberg had to be made at Hessental, now a suburb of Schwäbisch Hall, on the Hessental–Crailsheim section of the Hohenlohe Railway (then called the Kocherbahn), which opened in 1867. The majority of trains running from Crailsheim to Hessental proceed to Backnang and Stuttgart, missing the lower part of the Hohenlohe line through Schwäbisch Hall.

A branch line was built from Backnang via Marbach to Bietigheim in 1879 in order to provide a bypass of the Stuttgart node for long-distance transport. It is sometimes called the Little Murr Railway (Kleine Murrbahn).

The line was single track and after the First World War France prohibited its duplication for strategic reasons under the Treaty of Versailles. On the Rems Railway, in contrast, the line had been duplicated by 1910 to Gmünd. In 1926, its duplication was completed to Aalen and Goldshöfe.

Trains on the Murr line were mainly hauled after the First World War, with the establishment of Deutsche Reichsbahn, until 1975, by the famous Prussian P 8 locomotives, which had replaced the Royal Württemberg State Railways's class 38 locomotives.

On 22 December 1934 there was a major accident caused by a signalling error between Murrhardt and Sulzbach on the ridge at Schleißweiler. Two trains collided on the single track and ten people died.

In 1937 the Flying Stuttgart (Fliegende Stuttgarter), which was similar to the Flying Hamburger, ran on the line.

At the end of World War II the SS intended to blow up the Schanz Tunnel between Fornsbach and Fichtenberg. This plan was prevented just before its execution, however, by the courageous intervention of the mayor of Gaildorf, who feared the economic isolation of his region.

The Waiblingen–Backnang section was electrified and duplicated from 1962 to 1965. This included the duplication of the viaduct over the Rems. A new two-way tunnel was built next to the old single-track Schwaikheim Tunnel. This was lined completely with concrete rather than brick and was the first tunnel in Germany to be built this way. At first electrification only benefited local trains, which were mainly operated as push-pull trains, hauled by class 141 locomotives. Long-distance trains and most regional trains to Stuttgart continued to be hauled by steam and later diesel locomotives, since a change of locomotive in Backnang would have largely negated any saving in travel time.

In 1976 the era of steam ended on the line and diesel locomotives were used, with class 211/212 hauling local services. In the case of long-distance and regional services, class 220, later class 221 were used for long-distance trains and class 215 for regional trains. Later class 218 locomotives were used both for long-distance and regional trains, sometimes using double header operation before long trains.

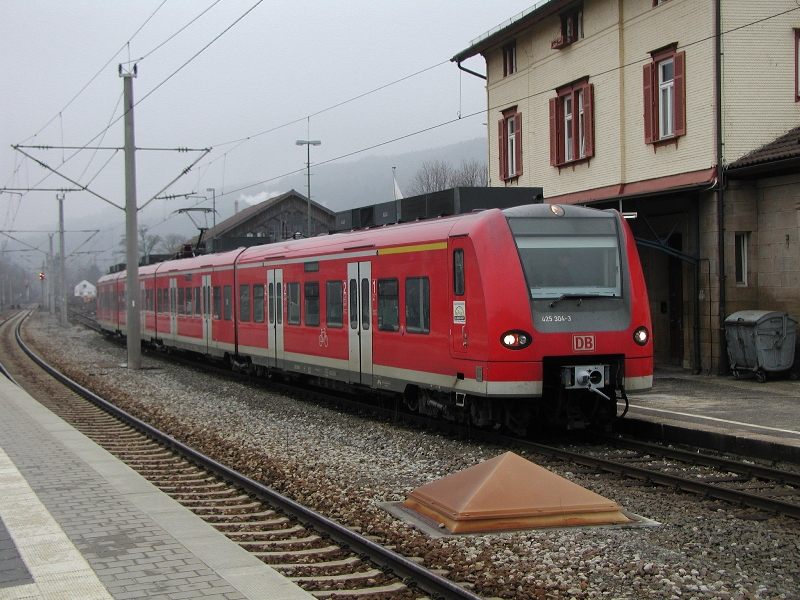
Multiple unit 425 304–3 in Murrhardt station

In the 1970s, various restoration measures began to be carried out on the Murr line, as on other German lines. Sidings for freight were built at several stations on the section between Backnang and Crailsheim. At the same time local services were thinned out, so that it was served almost exclusively by regional trains. With the electrification of the line from Goldshöfe via Crailsheim to Ansbach in 1985, the Murr line also lost all of its long-distance services, which now ran via the longer Rems line via Aalen.

In the autumn of 1981, Stuttgart S-Bahn services on line S3 began between Backnang and Stuttgart. This was accompanied by the introduction of a regular interval service to Backnang and extra services.

In 1996, the Marbach–Backnang line, the Backnang–Schwäbisch Hall-Hessental section of the Murr line and the Schwäbisch Hall-Hessental–Crailsheim section of the Hohenlohe line were electrified. Subsequently, all platforms at Fornsbach station were renovated. Since the upgrading of the line for regional services, long-distance services occasionally operate on the line.

=== Upgrades ===
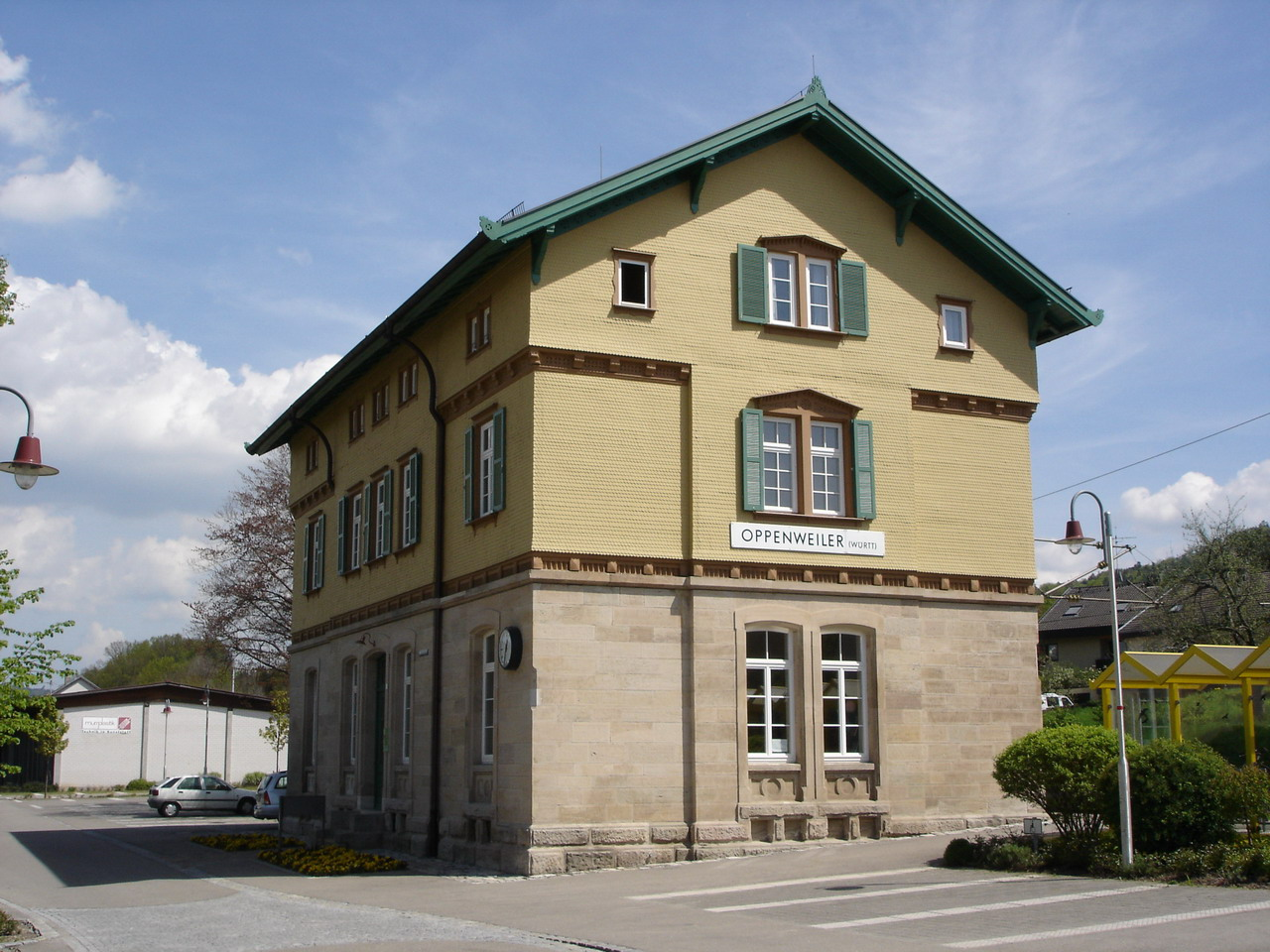
Oppenweiler station

In 2004, Deutsche Bahn announced that there would be further upgrading of the line with an additional track on the Oppenweiler–Sulzbach section, a section of double track at Fornsbach and the upgrading of signalling. This would have shortened the travel time between Schwäbisch Hall and Stuttgart by 10 minutes (especially by eliminating waiting time in Murrhardt). As a result of the reduction in funding for regional rail services in response to the Koch-Steinbrück Report, the proposed upgrade between Oppenweiler and Sulzbach was withdrawn at the end of 2004.

The Verband Region Stuttgart, which coordinates public transport investment in the Stuttgart regions, is examining the idea of extending S-Bahn operations to Murrhardt. This proposal is in competition with a proposal to improve Regional-Express and Regionalbahn services on this route.

The upgrade at Fornsbach station to improve passing opportunity involves a shift in the location of the platform 120 m closer to the town, two new platforms outside the tracks with an underpass and the installation of a passing track. The aim is that the single track line from Backnang to Schwäbisch Hall-Hessental with passing places at Murrhardt and Fornsbach would save about 10 minutes of waiting time and allow a coordinated timetable. The hearing procedures for the planning approval has been completed and construction of the €12 million project began in the summer of 2011. The project was commissioned on 9 December 2012, as expected.

=== Structures ===
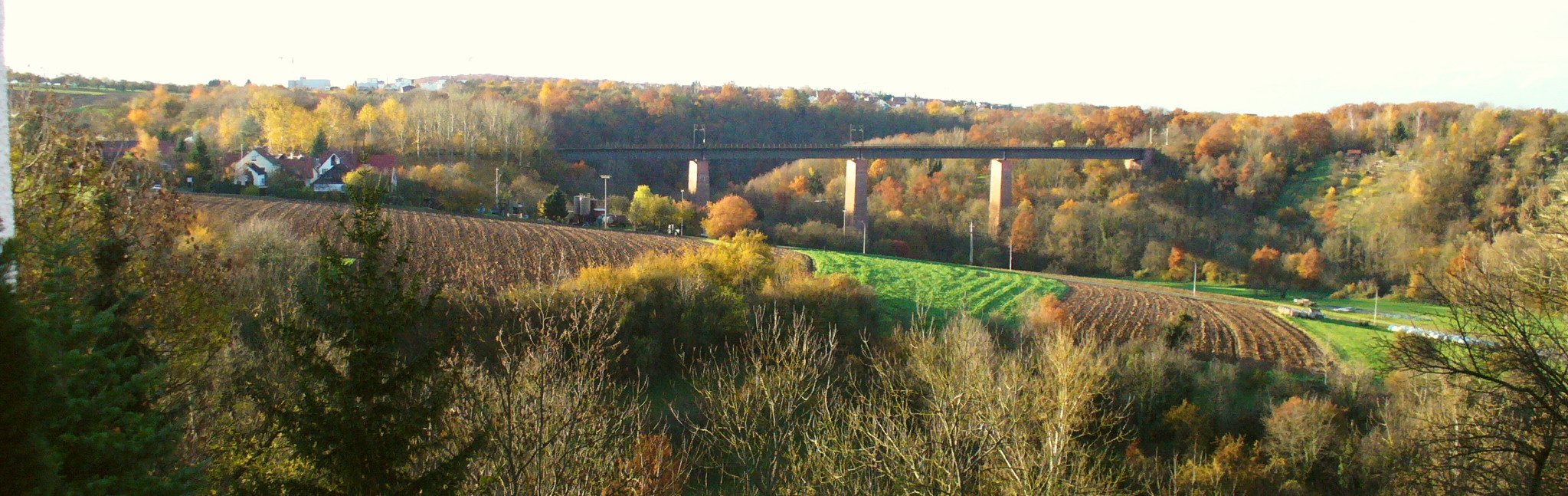
Rems Viaduct near Neustadt

- Rems Viaduct at Neustadt
- Schwaikheim Tunnel at Schwaikheim: built for the duplication and the electrification of the Waiblingen–Backnang section for the S-Bahn, replacing a single-track tunnel. It was built between 1963 and 1964 and was the first application of the New Austrian Tunnelling method on a railway in Germany. The old tunnel still exists and is walled up.
- Viaduct over the Weißach in Backnang
- Schanz Tunnel at Fichtenberg, 860 m long. The Schanz tunnel was the third longest tunnel in the network of the Royal Württemberg State Railways after the Hochdorf Tunnel on the Nagold Valley Railway and the Weinberg Tunnel on the Hohenlohe Railway. Because the inside of the mountain is composed of Gipskeuper rock containing anhydrite, which swells strongly when in contact with water, the tunnel floor has lifted by about four metres.
- Kappelesberg Tunnel at Gaildorf
- Viaduct over the Bühler at Vellberg

== Operations ==
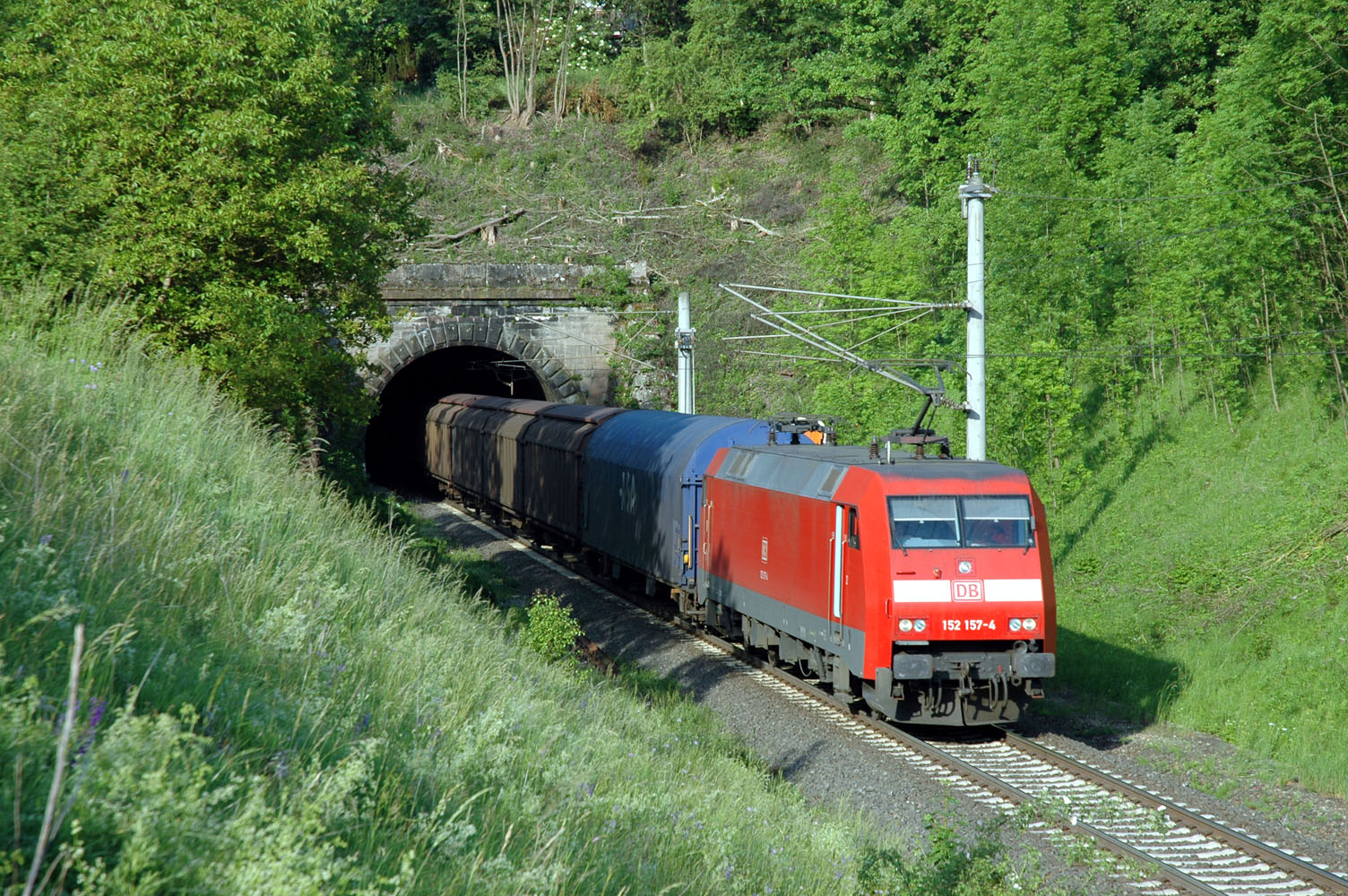
Freight train running to Kornwestheim near the exit from Schanz Tunnel near Fornsbach (May 2007)

The following types of rail services currently operate on the Murr Railway on working days:

- S-Bahn services on line S3 from Stuttgart Airport via Stuttgart and Waiblingen to Backnang
- hourly Regional-Express (RE) services from Stuttgart to Backnang, stopping only at Bad Cannstatt, Waiblingen and Winnenden. Their final destination alternates between Hessental or Nuremberg via Crailsheim.
- a pair of Interregio-Express (IRE) services between Stuttgart and Crailsheim via Backnang

The IRE and RE services use Silberling carriages, exclusively of the oldest build.

On the weekend Regionalbahn traffic between Backnang and Schwäbisch Hall is operated with class ET 425 electrical multiple units.

On 9 December 2006 the last long-distance train ran on the Murr line (with the exception of diverted traffic): an express from Nuremberg to Stuttgart (with coaches from Dresden and Prague).
