= Backnang station =

Railway station in Germany

Backnang
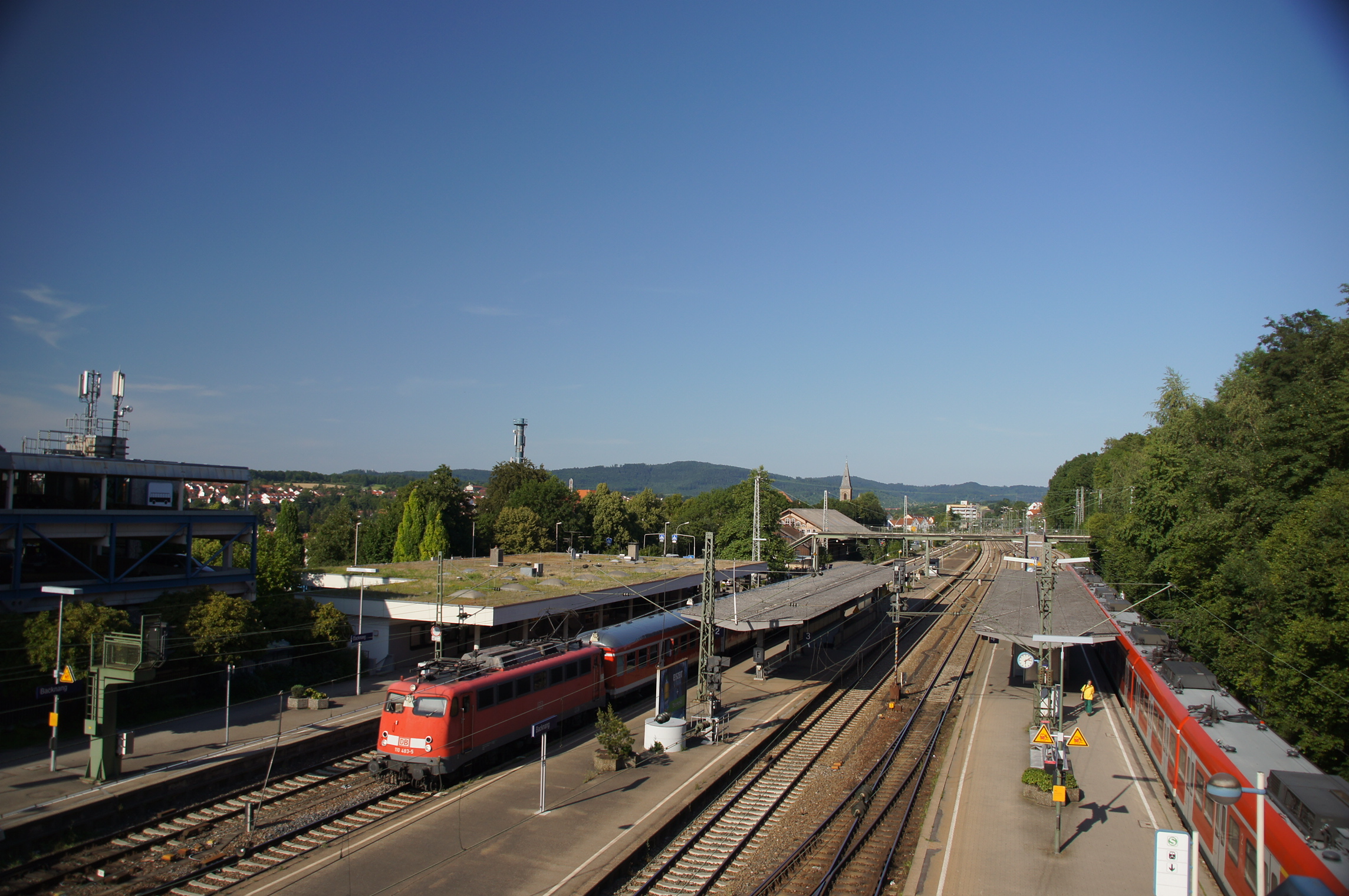

General information
- Location: Obere Bahnhofstr. 1, Backnang, Baden-Württemberg; Germany
- Coordinates: 48°56′33″N 9°25′34″E
- Owner: Deutsche Bahn
- Operator: DB Netz; DB Station&Service
- Lines: Murrbahn (KBS 785) S 3; Backnang–Ludwigsburg (KBS 790.4) S 4
- Platforms: 5

Construction
- Accessible: Yes (regularly used platforms)

Other information
- Station code: 244
- DS100 code: TB
- IBNR: 8000016
- Category: 3
- Fare zone: : 4
- Website: www.bahnhof.de

History
- Opened: 26 October 1876

Services
Preceding station		Following station
Winnenden towards Stuttgart Hbf	RE 90	Oppenweiler (Württ) towards Nürnberg Hbf
Preceding station	DB Regio Baden-Württemberg	Following station
Winnenden towards Stuttgart Hbf	MEX 19	Oppenweiler (Württ) towards Schwäbisch Hall-Hessental or Crailsheim
Winnenden towards Stuttgart Hbf	MEX 90	Oppenweiler (Württ) towards Schwäbisch Hall-Hessental
Preceding station	Stuttgart S-Bahn	Following station
Maubach towards Flughafen/Messe	S3	Terminus
Burgstall (Murr) towards Schwabstraße	S4	Terminus
Location

Backnang station is located on the Waiblingen–Schwäbisch Hall railway and is the starting point of the Backnang–Ludwigsburg railway in the city of Backnang in the German state of Baden-Württemberg. It is served by Regional-Express services. It is the terminus of lines S 3 and S 4 of the Stuttgart S-Bahn. It is classified by Deutsche Bahn as a category 3 station.

== History ==
In the 1860s, the citizens of the Oberamt (district) of Backnang sought a connection to the rail network. In 1863, the Backnang trade association, together with trade associations in other towns, wrote a petition to the Württemberg ministry of foreign affairs, which was then in charge of railway construction. By the autumn engineers had travelled to the area to make surveys.

=== State Railways and Deutsche Reichsbahn periods ===
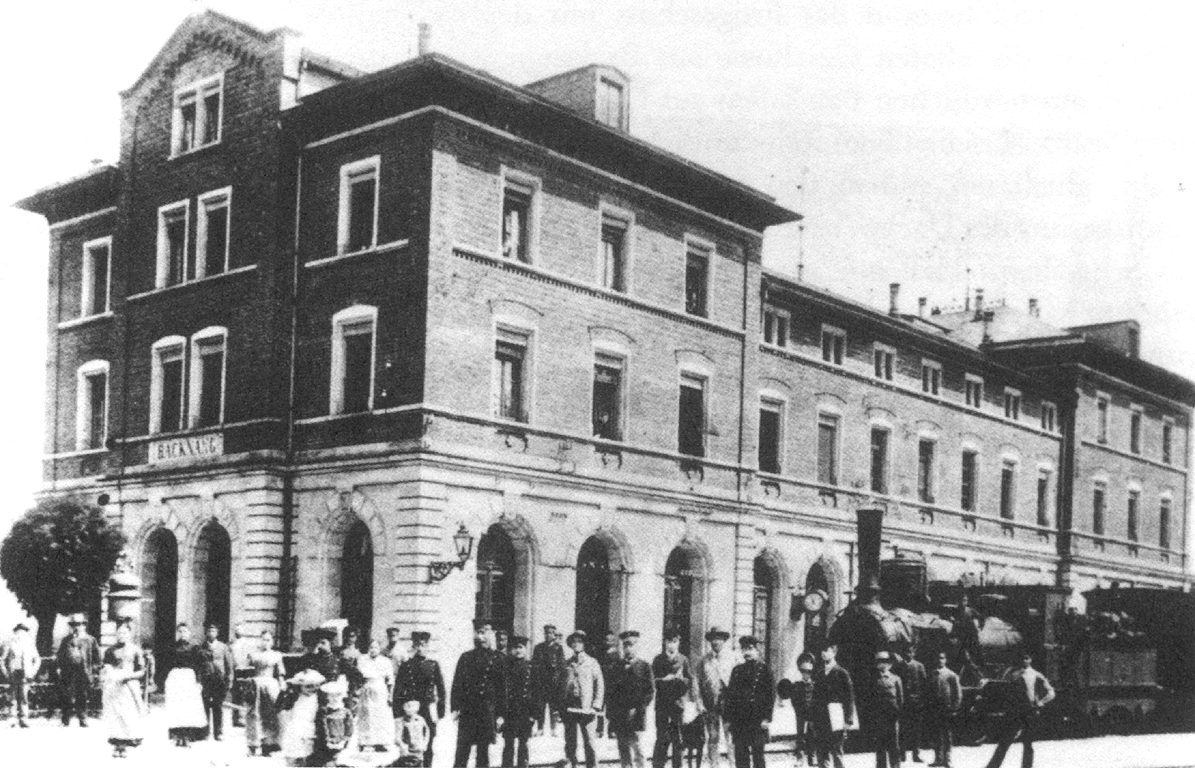
Backnang station in 1900

On 26 October 1876, the Royal Württemberg State Railways (German: Königlich Württembergischen Staats-Eisenbahnen) opened the Murr Valley Railway between Waiblingen and Backnang. The station is located on a slope above the old town and a temporary entrance building was built. In 1877, work began on the permanent station building, made of sandstone and brick. On 18 October 1877, a restaurant was opened in the partially completed building. The temporary building was demolished in November 1877. The new station building was inaugurated along with the opening of the Backnang–Murrhardt section on 18 April 1878. It was a long two and a half storeys high central block with two three-story wings, which were covered with a hipped roof. The ground floor was made of sandstone. The doors and windows were built with round arches. The upper floors were made of brick, with the lintels and cornices built of sandstone as a contrast.

Since 1873, it had been clear that a branch line from the Murr Railway to the Northern Railway was necessary to relieve the railway junction at Stuttgart. This project was realised when the State Railway opened the Backnang–Bietigheim railway on 8 December 1879. This line branches off from the southern end of the station and descends from there into the Murr valley.

The town council built the Hexenstäffele, a new footpath from Kalten Wasser (now called Eduard Breuninger-Straße) to the station, which was opened on 19 July 1879. The original route was altered in 1928. On 12 September 1888, Dillensiusstraße was renamed Untere Bahnhofstraße (“lower station street”, called Bahnhofstraße since 1929) and Güterbahnhofstraße ("freight yard street") was renamed Obere Bahnhofstraße (“upper station street”).

During the Second World War, Backnang was the target of several air raids. A fighter-bomber attack on 22 February 1944 damaged 59 buildings, including the station building.

=== Deutsche Bundesbahn and Deutsche Bahn periods ===
Deutsche Bundesbahn duplicated and electrified the Waiblingen–Backnang section from 1962 to 1965. Nevertheless, the locomotives of most trains were not changed in Backnang, which would have led to an extension of running times.

On 20 March 1973, demolition began of the nearly a century-old station building to make room for a new building. The new one-story building was opened on 20 August 1975.

Since the start of planning of an S-Bahn for Stuttgart and the surrounding area in the 1960s, a terminus at Backnang was planned. On 27 September 1981, S-Bahn line S 3 opened between Backnang and Schwabstraße.

On 31 May 1996, the lines to Marbach and Crailsheim were electrified. This ended diesel operation in Backnang. On 8 December 2012, the extension of the S-Bahn line S 4 between Marbach and Backnang was opened.

== Rail operations ==
The station is a railway junction where the Backnang–Ludwigsburg railway branches off the Waiblingen–Schwäbisch Hall railway. Platform track 1 is used by trains on line 4 of the S-Bahn to/from Stuttgart Schwabstraße via Marbach and Ludwigsburg. Some regional trains at the end of the day stop on track 3. Regional trains towards Schwäbisch Hall-Hessental stop on track 4. Line S 3 S-Bahn services to/from Waiblingen stop on track 5. It is classified by Deutsche Bahn as a category 3 station.

=== Regional Transport ===
Route		Frequency
RE 90	Stuttgart – Bad Cannstatt – Waiblingen – Backnang – Gaildorf West – Schwäbisch Hall-Hessental	120 mins (alternating with MEX 90)
MEX 90	Stuttgart – Bad Cannstatt – Waiblingen – Backnang – Gaildorf West – Schwäbisch Hall-Hessental – Crailsheim – Ansbach – Nuremberg	120 mins (alternating with RE 90)
MEX 19	Stuttgart – Bad Cannstatt – Waiblingen – Backnang – Gaildorf West	60 mins

=== S-Bahn ===
Line	Route
S 3	Backnang – Winnenden – Waiblingen – Bad Cannstatt – Hauptbahnhof – Schwabstraße – Vaihingen – Rohr – Flughafen/Messe (additional services run in peaks between Backnang and Vaihingen)
S 4	Backnang – Marbach – Ludwigsburg – Zuffenhausen – Stuttgart North – Hauptbahnhof – Schwabstraße
