= Stuttgart North station =

Railway station in Germany

Stuttgart Nord
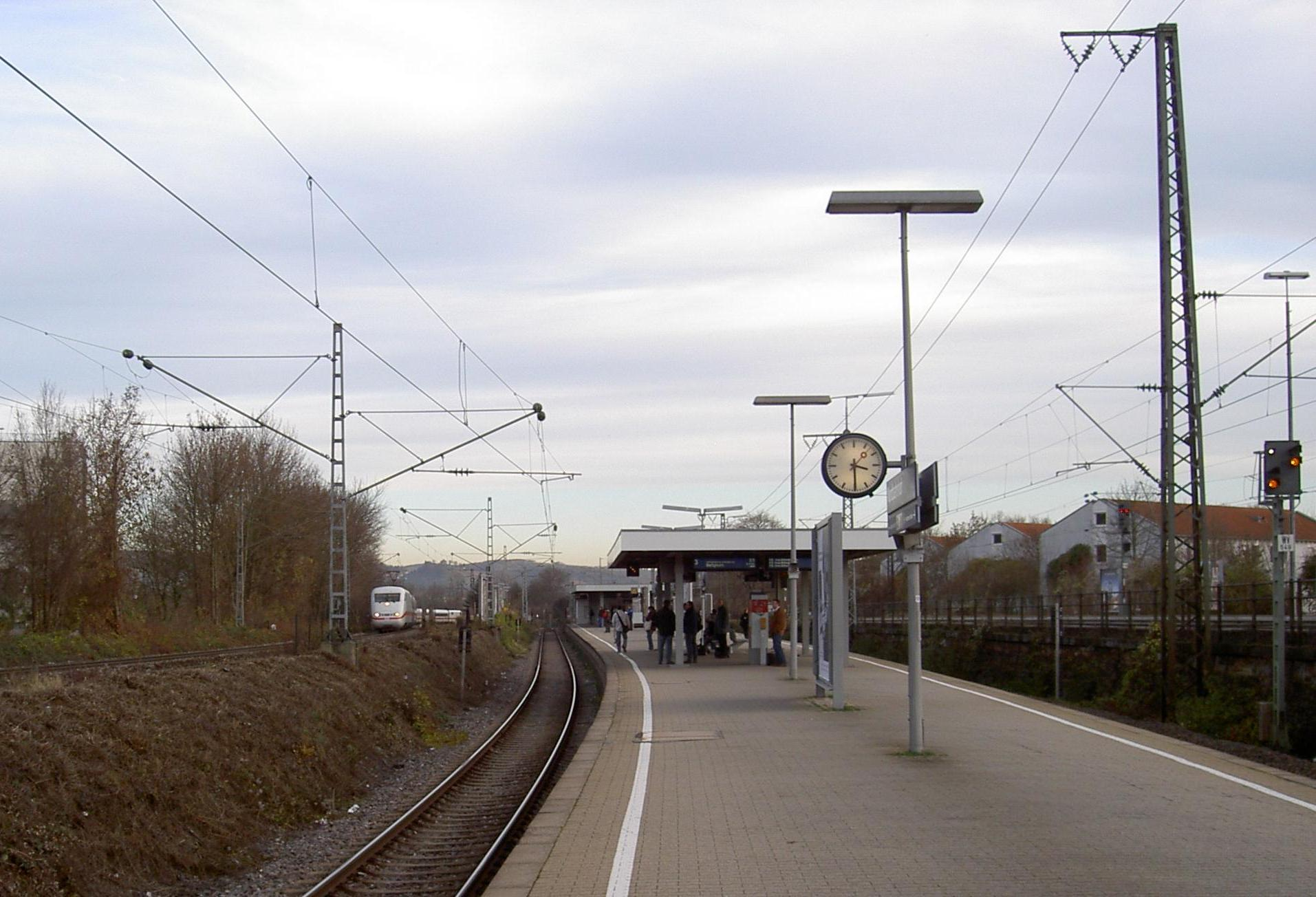

General information
- Other names: Nordbahnhof
- Location: Stuttgart, Baden-Württemberg; Germany
- Coordinates: 48°48′13″N 9°11′16″E
- Owner: DB Netz
- Operator: DB Station&Service
- Lines: Franconia Railway (KSB 780, 790.4-5); Connecting curve to Stuttgart–Horb railway
- Platforms: 2 (1 island platform)
- Tracks: 4
- Train operators: S-Bahn Stuttgart
- Connections: U12

Construction
- Accessible: Yes

Other information
- Station code: 6073
- DS100 code: TSN
- IBNR: 8005767
- Category: 5
- Fare zone: : 1
- Website: www.bahnhof.de

History
- Opened: 1 October 1896

Services
Preceding station	Stuttgart S-Bahn	Following station
Hauptbahnhof towards Schwabstraße	S4	Feuerbach towards Backnang
Hauptbahnhof towards Schwabstraße	S5	Feuerbach towards Bietigheim-Bissingen
Hauptbahnhof towards Schwabstraße	S6	Feuerbach towards Weil der Stadt
Hauptbahnhof towards Schwabstraße	S60	Feuerbach towards Böblingen
Location

Stuttgart North station (German: Stuttgart Nordbahnhof) is a railway station in Stuttgart, Germany, serving the North area of the city. It consists of a passenger railway station on the Stuttgart S-Bahn and a goods yard.

== History ==
Owing to the increasing volume of traffic, the Royal Württemberg State Railways (Königlich Württembergische Staats-Eisenbahnen) required further locomotives. In 1891, the railways acquired land for a new yard in the district of Prag at the junction of the Stuttgart–Horb railway (then considered part of the Gäu Railway) and the Northern Railways (Frankenbahn) with a locomotive depot with 59 locomotive stalls and a freight yard. Two years later, in 1893, construction began. The aim was to relieve the old Stuttgart Central Station. Tracks were also laid from Feuerbach for freight trains running towards the Gäu Railway.

In April 1894, the railway depot was inaugurated. On 1 November 1895, operations started at the Prag goods yard (Prag-Güterbahnhof). It also had a military loading ramp and a loading dock for the discharge of sewage.

The Prag area developed into a suburb with new homes built for the staff of the Royal Railway administration (königliche Eisenbahnverwaltung) that was established in 1894. It also decided to build a railway station for passengers in the Cannstatt district on Ludwigsburg road (called Nordbahnhofstraße since 1936). This was opened as Prag station on 1 October 1896. It was soon renamed as Stuttgart North to avoid confusion with the Czech capital, also called Prag in German. The entrance building with a service and a waiting room was built on the track towards Feuerbach, with a larger waiting room built on the track towards Stuttgart Central Station. An iron footbridge was built across the goods yard.

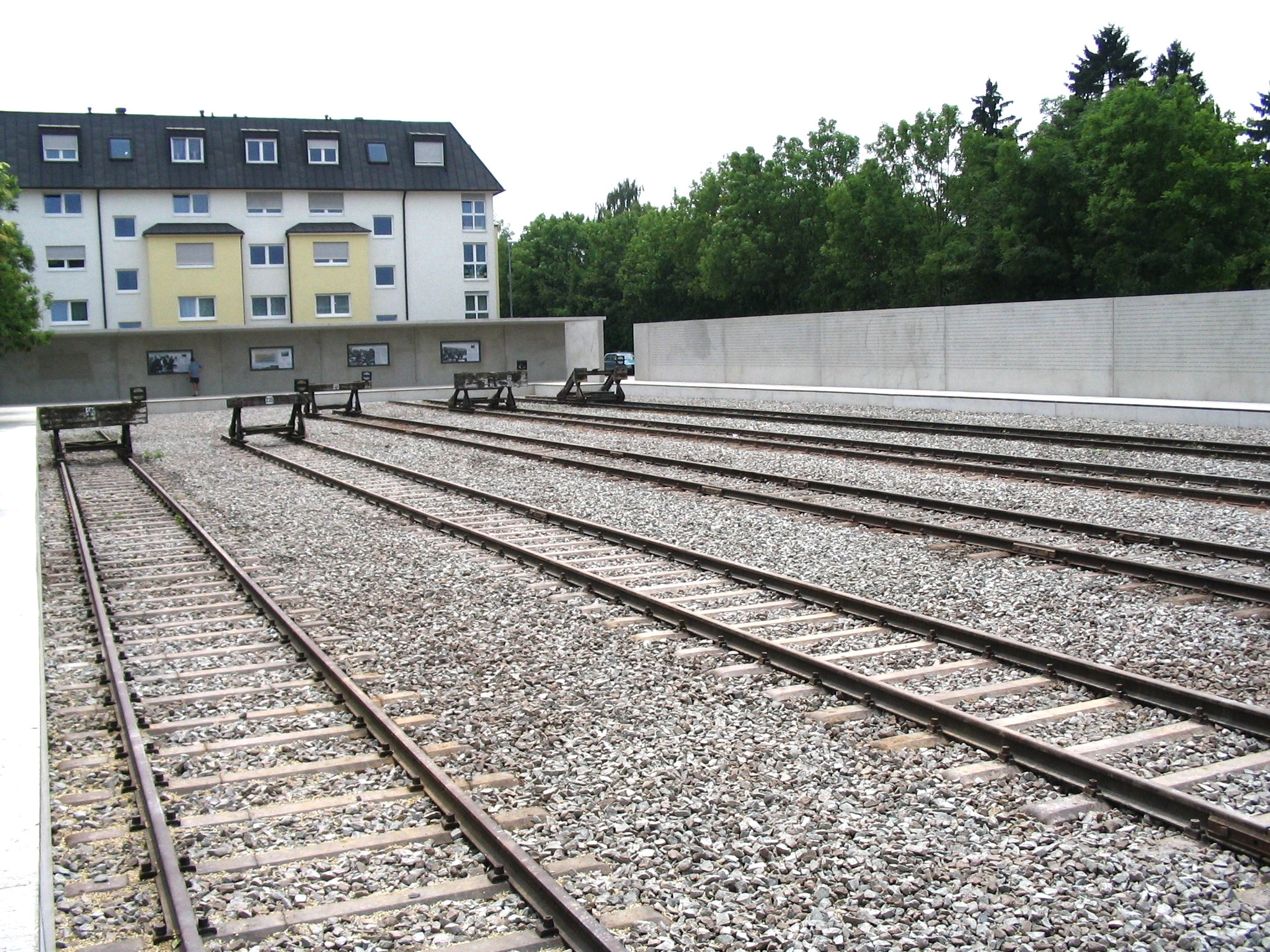
The memorial to the Jewish deportations is located at the old North station

In 1908, quadruplication began on the line between Stuttgart Central Station and Ludwigsburg, which led to the nearly complete rebuilding of the tracks and the station. The commissioning of the Rankbach Railway in 1915 and the marshalling yard in Kornwestheim in 1918 relieved the new freight yard, which from that time was called Stuttgart Nord Gbf (Stuttgart North freight yard). Suburban services commenced in November 1926. The passenger station was rebuilt over the newly built passage crossing Ludwigsburg road. The depot was given a new role as the main workshop and after the Second World War as a repair shop.

Between 1941 and 1945 the loading tracks of the inner North Station goods yard were used for the deportation of more than 2,200 Jews from all over Württemberg to Theresienstadt, Auschwitz, Riga and Izbica. Since 2006, a memorial at the station commemorates these events.

=== Outlook ===
During the Stuttgart 21 project, the station will be reduced to a passenger halt with all trackage being removed except for the S-Bahn tracks. A distant signal for the proposed Mittnachtstraße station will be established at the southern end of the platform. Long-distance and regional trains will run between Central Station and Feuerbach through the Feuerbach Tunnel.

In addition, as part of the project, the option of constructing an S-Bahn route designated as the T-Spange (T-Brace) is to be kept open. This would provide a direct connection from North station to Bad Canstatt, enabling journeys between these stations without needing to transfer at Stuttgart Hauptbahnhof. The route would branch off at Feuerbach and run underground until meeting the existing S-Bahn tracks to Bad Canstatt, with an underground island platform being constructed at North station.

In conjunction with this, the so-called Nordkreuz (north cross) option is to be implemented in the future if sufficient potential traffic can be demonstrated. This would consist of a track connection to the Stuttgart–Horb railway, allowing S-Bahn trains to bypass the main S-Bahn tunnel and creating an additional north-south link. This was developed as an option during the regional planning process for the project. It is unnecessary to implement structural measures for the option during the Stuttgart 21 project.

== Rail services ==
The passenger station consists of an island platform with access from Nordbahnhofstraße and the Brünner footbridge and is served by the lines S4, S5 and S6 of the Stuttgart S-Bahn.

Platform track 3 is used by S-Bahn services towards Zuffenhausen and platform track 4 is used by S-Bahn services towards Stuttgart Central Station (Hauptbahnhof). The slightly higher tracks 1 and 2 are used for long-distance traffic and do not have platforms.

The station is classified by Deutsche Bahn as a category 5 station.

The station's signalling systems can be remotely controlled from the SpDr-L60 interlocking in Zuffenhausen, which went into operation in 1973. The only rarely used freight yard has a variety of track layouts with multiple terminal tracks. An unused signal box called Stuttgart Nord R1 is the transition to the Franconia Railway. The building of the train depot still exists today and is now used as a conference centre.

=== S-Bahn ===
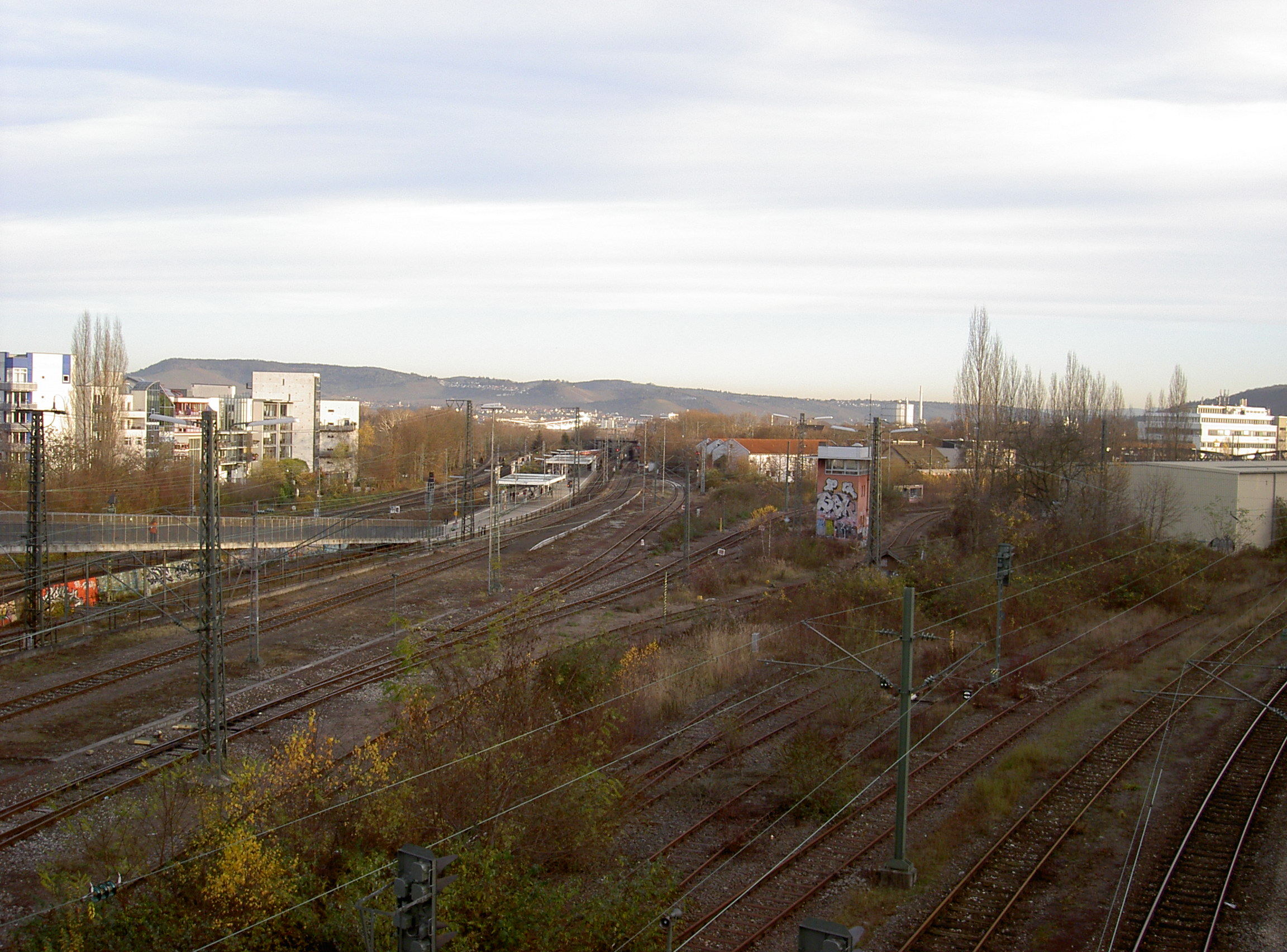
View of the exterior of North station (November 2009)

Line	Route
S 4	Backnang – Marbach – Ludwigsburg – Zuffenhausen – Stuttgart North – Hauptbahnhof – Schwabstraße
S 5	Bietigheim – Ludwigsburg – Zuffenhausen – Stuttgart North – Hauptbahnhof – Schwabstraße
S 6	Weil der Stadt – Renningen – Leonberg – Zuffenhausen – Stuttgart North – Hauptbahnhof – Schwabstraße (additional services in the peak between Leonberg and Schwabstraße)
S 60	Schwabstraße – Hauptbahnhof – Stuttgart North – Zuffenhausen – Leonberg – Renningen – Magstadt – Maichingen – Sindelfingen – Böblingen

=== Stadtbahn ===
North station was served by Stadtbahn line U15 for many years. In 2013 this was changed to line U12. The Löwentorbrücke stop in Heilbronner Strasse can also be reached via footbridges, called Brno bridge and Bombay bridge. It is served by Stadtbahn lines U6, U7 and U15.
