= Stuttgart Neuwirtshaus station =

Railway station in Germany

Neuwirtshaus (Porscheplatz)
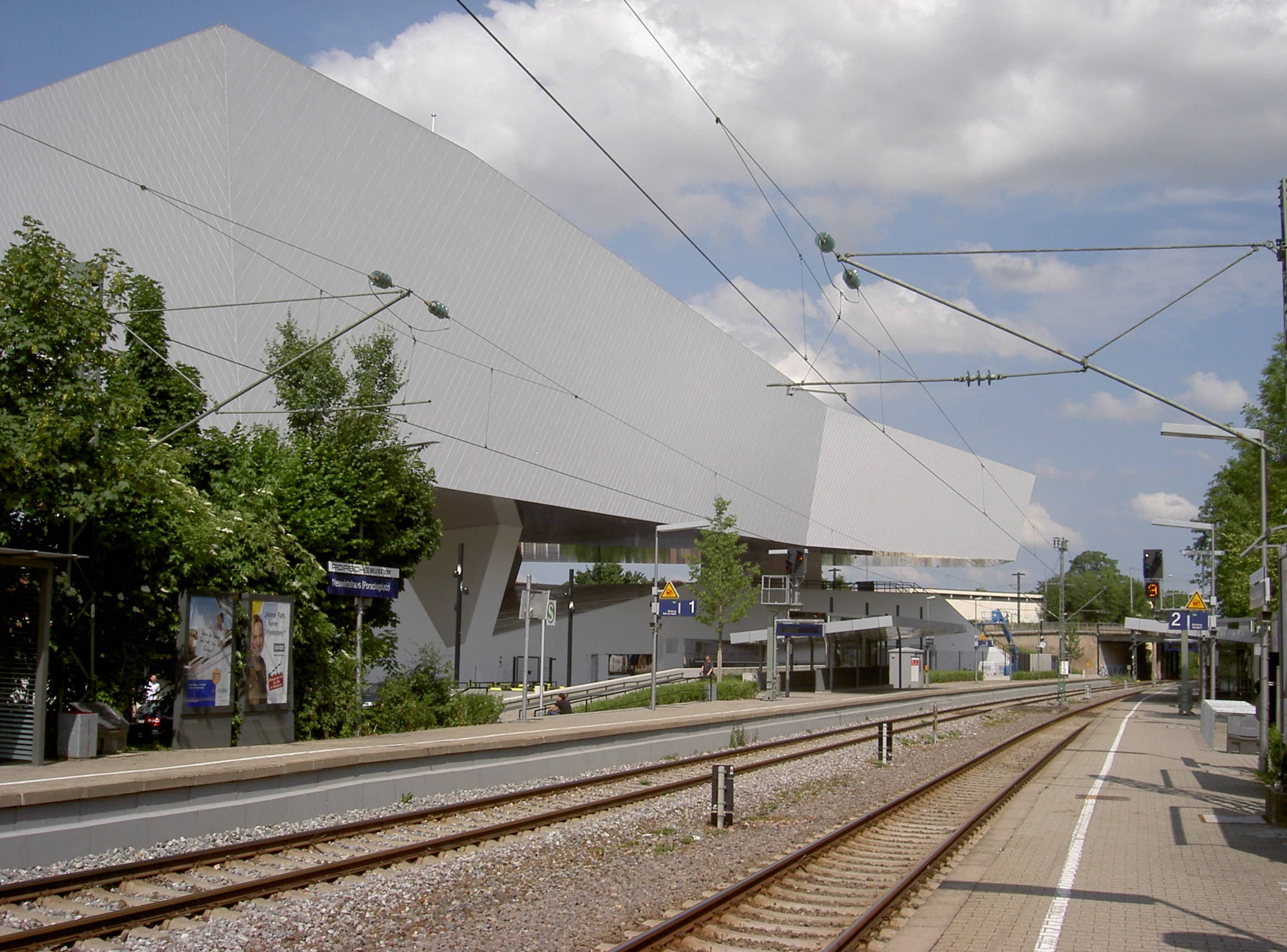

General information
- Location: Porscheplatz, Stuttgart, Baden-Württemberg; Germany
- Coordinates: 48°50′02″N 9°09′09″E
- Line: Black Forest Railway (KSB 790.6)
- Platforms: 2

Construction
- Accessible: Yes

Other information
- Station code: 4467
- DS100 code: TNW
- IBNR: 8004338
- Category: 4
- Fare zone: : 1
- Website: www.bahnhof.de

History
- Opened: 22 May 1937

Services
Preceding station	Stuttgart S-Bahn	Following station
Stuttgart-Zuffenhausen towards Schwabstraße	S6	Korntal towards Weil der Stadt
Stuttgart-Zuffenhausen towards Schwabstraße	S60	Korntal towards Böblingen
Location

Neuwirtshaus (Porscheplatz) station is on the Stuttgart S-Bahn in the Stuttgart district of Zuffenhausen in the German state of Baden-Württemberg.

== History ==
Between 1933 and 1937 the settlement of Neuwirtshaus was built in northern Zuffenhausen. Deutsche Reichsbahn built a station on the Württemberg Black Forest line for the approximately 1,500 residents southeast of the settlement on Schwieberdinger Straße, the former route of national route (Reichsstraße) 10 (now federal highway 10). The opening was held on 22 May 1937. A wooden station building that no longer exists consisted of a service room and a waiting room. From 1932 to 1939 the Reichsbahn duplicated the Black Forest Railway between Zuffenhausen and Renningen. On 1 December 1937, the second track was opened from Neuwirtshaus station towards Zuffenhausen. In 1940, electrical operations commenced between Stuttgart Central Station (Hauptbahnhof) and Weil der Stadt.

After World War II, an important industrial centre developed in the area around Schwieberdinger Straße. In 1950, Porsche KG, which had re-established itself after the war in Gmünd, Austria, returned to Stuttgart by establishing its headquarters in Zuffenhausen. As a result, commuter traffic volumes rose at the station. The residents of Neuwirtshaus preferred to use buses after Stuttgarter Straßenbahnen (the Stuttgart tram and bus company) added a bus stop to its route network in the district at Nordseestraße.

On 10 June 2001, Porscheplatz was added to the station's name. In October 2005, construction began on the new Porsche Museum in the immediate vicinity. The sports car manufacturer called for a reorganisation of the now rundown station. The continuing importance of the station increased with the opening of the museum on 31 January 2009. The modernised station was officially inaugurated on 2 June 2009 after six months of reconstruction. Deutsche Bahn, the city of Stuttgart and Porsche shared the costs equally. The architecture and the colour the roofs in the area of stairs and lifts are aligned to the museum and an additional plate on the station sign also advertises the existence of the museum. The underpass lighting is also designed in bright silver to reflect the museum's walls. All the railings contrast with the museum with their black colour.

== Rail services ==
The station is served by line S 6 and S 60 of the Stuttgart S-Bahn and in the peak hour by services of the Württemberg Railway Company (Württembergische Eisenbahn-Gesellschaft, WEG). It has two through tracks. Track 1 is used for services to Korntal and track 2 is used for services to Zuffenhausen.

The station is classified by Deutsche Bahn as a category 4 station.

=== S-Bahn ===
Line	Route
S 6	Weil der Stadt – Renningen – Leonberg – Neuwirtshaus – Zuffenhausen – Hauptbahnhof – Schwabstraße (additional services in the peak between Leonberg and Schwabstraße)
S 60	Böblingen – Sindelfingen – Magstadt – Renningen – Leonberg – Neuwirtshaus – Zuffenhausen – Hauptbahnhof – Schwabstraße

=== Regional transport ===
Linie	Strecke
WEG R61	Feuerbach – Zuffenhausen – Korntal – Hemmingen – Heimerdingen – Weissach
