= Black Forest Railway =

Black Forest Railway (German: Schwarzwaldbahn) is the name of two railway lines in the German federated state of Baden-Württemberg:

- The Black Forest Railway (Baden) from Offenburg to Singen (Hohentwiel)
- The Black Forest Railway (Württemberg) from Stuttgart via Weil der Stadt to Calw
