= Black Forest Railway (Württemberg) =

Railway line in Germany

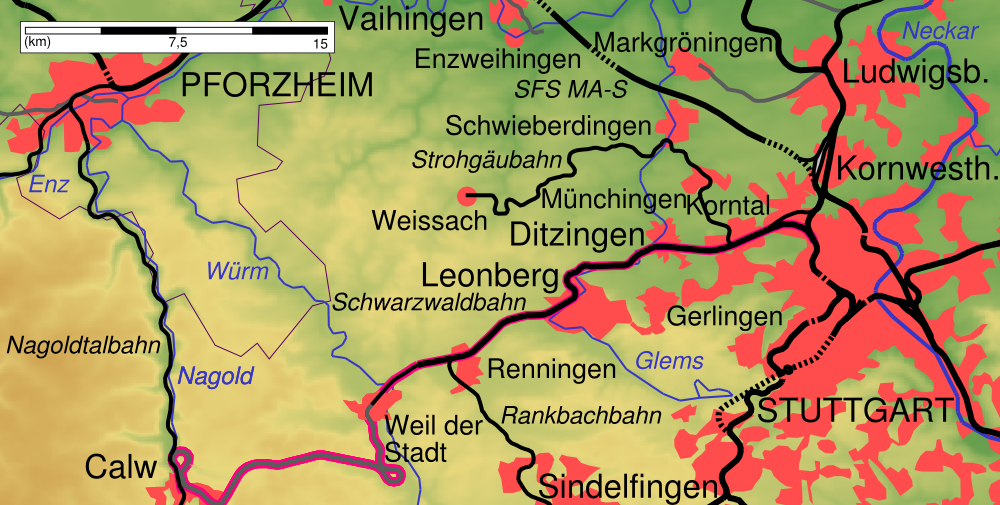

Overview
- Native name: Schwarzwaldbahn (Württemberg)
- Line number: 4810
- Locale: Baden-Württemberg, Germany
- Termini: Stuttgart-Zuffenhausen; Weil der Stadt
- Website: Hermann-Hesse-Bahn

Service
- Services: Stuttgart S-Bahn: S 6 (to Weil der Stadt); S 60 (to Renningen); SWEG: Hermann-Hesse-Bahn (Renningen to Calw)
- Route number: 790.6

Technical
- Line length: 48.52 km (30.15 mi)
- Track gauge: 1,435 mm (4 ft 8 1/2 in) standard gauge
- Minimum radius: 335 m (1,099 ft)
- Electrification: 15 kV/16.7 Hz AC overhead catenary
- Operating speed: 120 km/h (75 mph)
- Maximum incline: 1.8%

The Black Forest Railway (German: Schwarzwaldbahn)—also known as the Württembergische Schwarzwaldbahn ("Württemberg Black Forest Railway") to distinguish it from the railway of the same name in Baden—is a railway line in southern Germany from Stuttgart to Calw, passing through the foothills of the Black Forest, that was opened in stages between 1868 and 1872.

The Stuttgart–Weil der Stadt section was electrified in the 1930s and has been operated as part of the Stuttgart S-Bahn network since 1978.

The section from Weil der Stadt to Calw was closed to passenger services in 1983 and goods traffic ceased in 1988. This section has been reactivated as the SWEG Hermann-Hesse-Bahn from 1 February 2026. This train currently runs from Calw to Weil der Stadt, with plans to extend services to Renningen in the summer after infrastructural improvements.

== History ==
In 1865, the parliament of Württemberg determined to build the Black Forest Railway from Stuttgart via Leonberg and Weil der Stadt to Calw. Planning and construction of the line was directed by Carl Julius Abel. The Black Forest Railway was planned and built as a main line railway, that is with few curves, large radius curves and few level crossings. Moreover, the civil engineering of the line—the two tunnels and the bridgedecks of all the bridges—was designed to allow the construction of a second track. The formation of the line was however generally built as a single-track line, except for the Althengstett–Calw section, which was built as two tracks, so that operations on the 10.5-kilometre-long Calw–Althengstett ramp could run smoothly. This was the first two-track section built on a line in Württemberg during its initial construction.

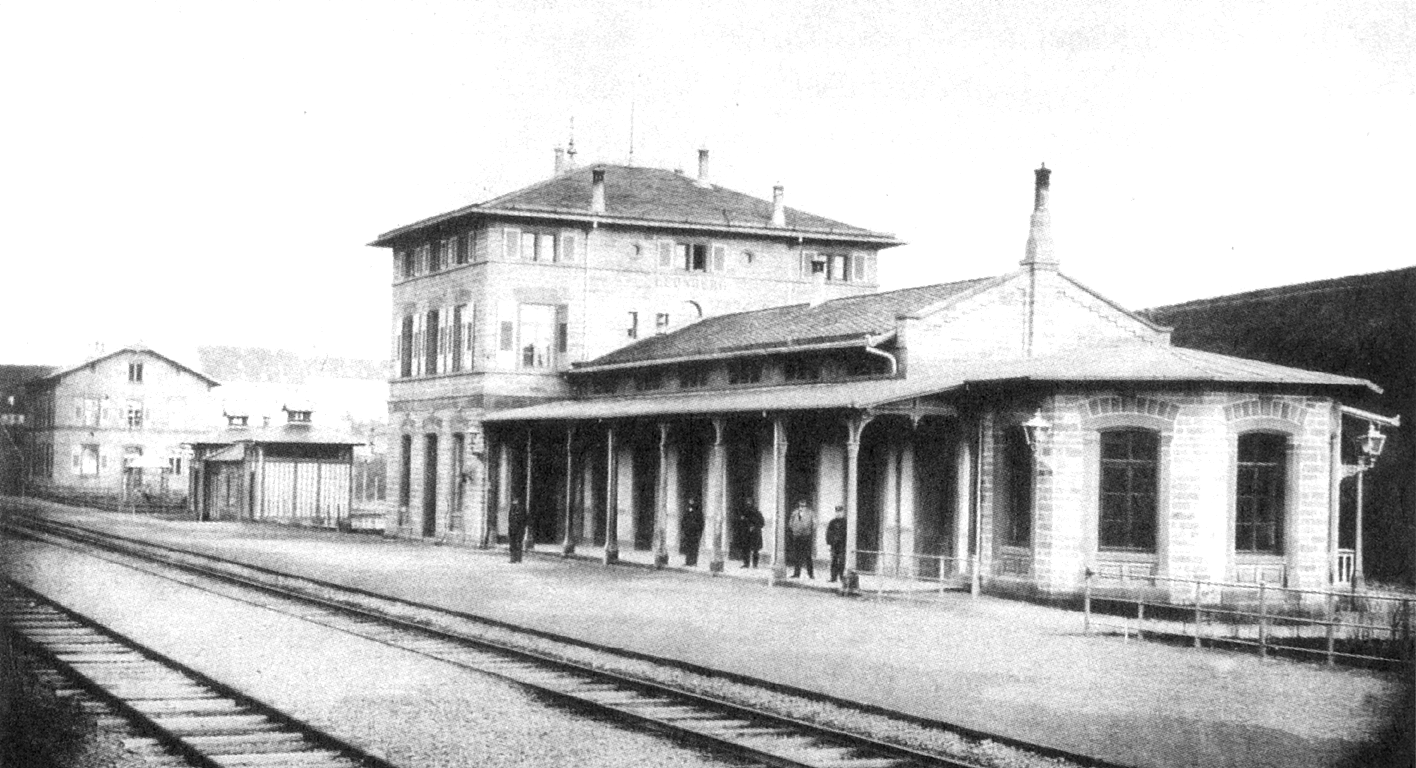
First Leonberg station (about 1870)

The Royal Württemberg State Railways completed the section from Zuffenhausen to Ditzingen in 1868 and a year later the section to Weil der Stadt. The last and hardest part of the line between Weil der Stadt and Calw was not completed until 1872. It included a tight loop with a radius of 335 metres to pass by Hackenberg (hill) near Schafhausen. A loop built on a similar principle was built at the end of the line at Hirsau. Here it was necessary to overcome the large height difference between Calw and Althengstett by extending the line. The line runs through the valley of the Tälesbach, a tributary of the Nagold in an extended loop and then turns back and runs through the Hirsau Tunnel to the flank of the Nagold valley. That meant that trains running from Calw towards Althengstett, initially ran to the north and then looped around on the eastern slope of the Nagold valley to run parallel on the same hillside but a lot higher and now running south. The model for this type of alignment was the Brenner Railway in Austria.

Apart from the Hirsau Tunnel, the planners considered it necessary to create two more tunnels in this last phase of construction due to the topographical conditions, but only one was built, the 696-metre-long Forst Tunnel. The other, which was originally to be built between Althengstett and Calw, could not be built because of geological problems. Instead, the Feldhütte cutting, which was 1,150 metres long and up to 38 metres deep was built.

The Calw maintenance shop (Bahnbetriebswerk Calw) was completed at the end of the track in Calw in 1872.

=== Since 1932 ===
==== Stuttgart-Weil der Stadt: upgrade and integration into the S-Bahn ====
A second track was laid between Stuttgart and Renningen in 1932–1939. Electrification on the section from Stuttgart-Zuffenhausen to Leonberg was completed on 15 May 1939 and on the section from Leonberg to Weil der Stadt on 18 December 1939. Class E 44 electric multiple units were used on the electrified section; after the Second World War, class E 52 sets were used.

Since 1978, the Stuttgart–Weil der Stadt section has been integrated as line S 6 of the network of the Stuttgart S-Bahn. At first DMUs continued to Calw as feeders to the S-Bahn. As part of the establishment of the S-Bahn, a 1 kilometre-long flying junction was built in Zuffenhausen station for the line to Weil der Stadt with an elevated platform and ramps with a 3.0 percent grade.

On 3 December 1988, Stuttgart-Weilimdorf station was opened at a cost of just under DM five million. In October 2003, a second track was put in operation between Renningen and Malmsheim. This allows S-Bahn services to operate with longer travel times, but greater stability, with train now scheduled to cross in Malmsheim rather than in Weil der Stadt. The longer travel time results from the need for trains to stop in Renningen to meet S-Bahn trains on line S 60, which commenced in December 2012.

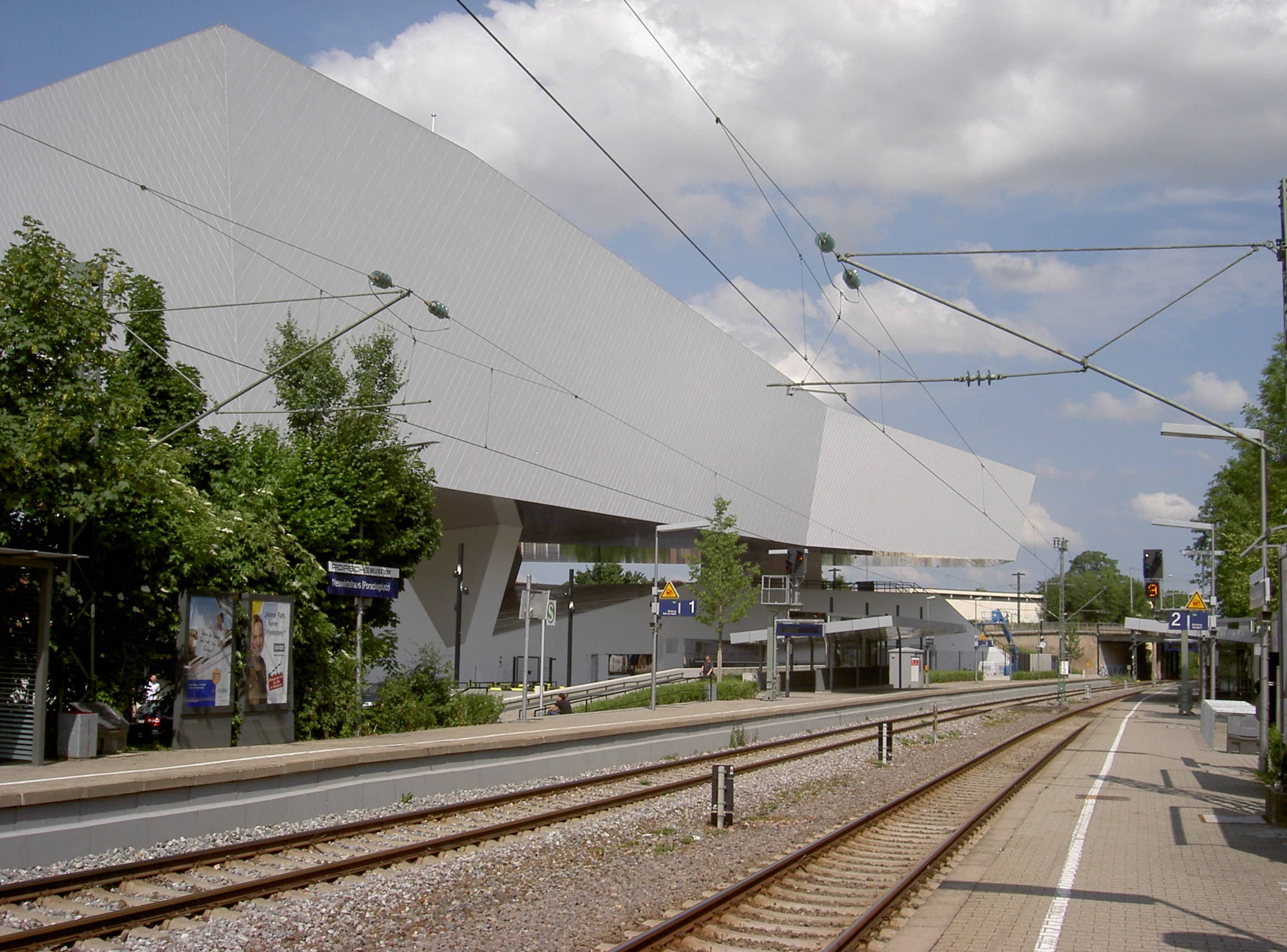
Neuwirtshaus (Porscheplatz) station

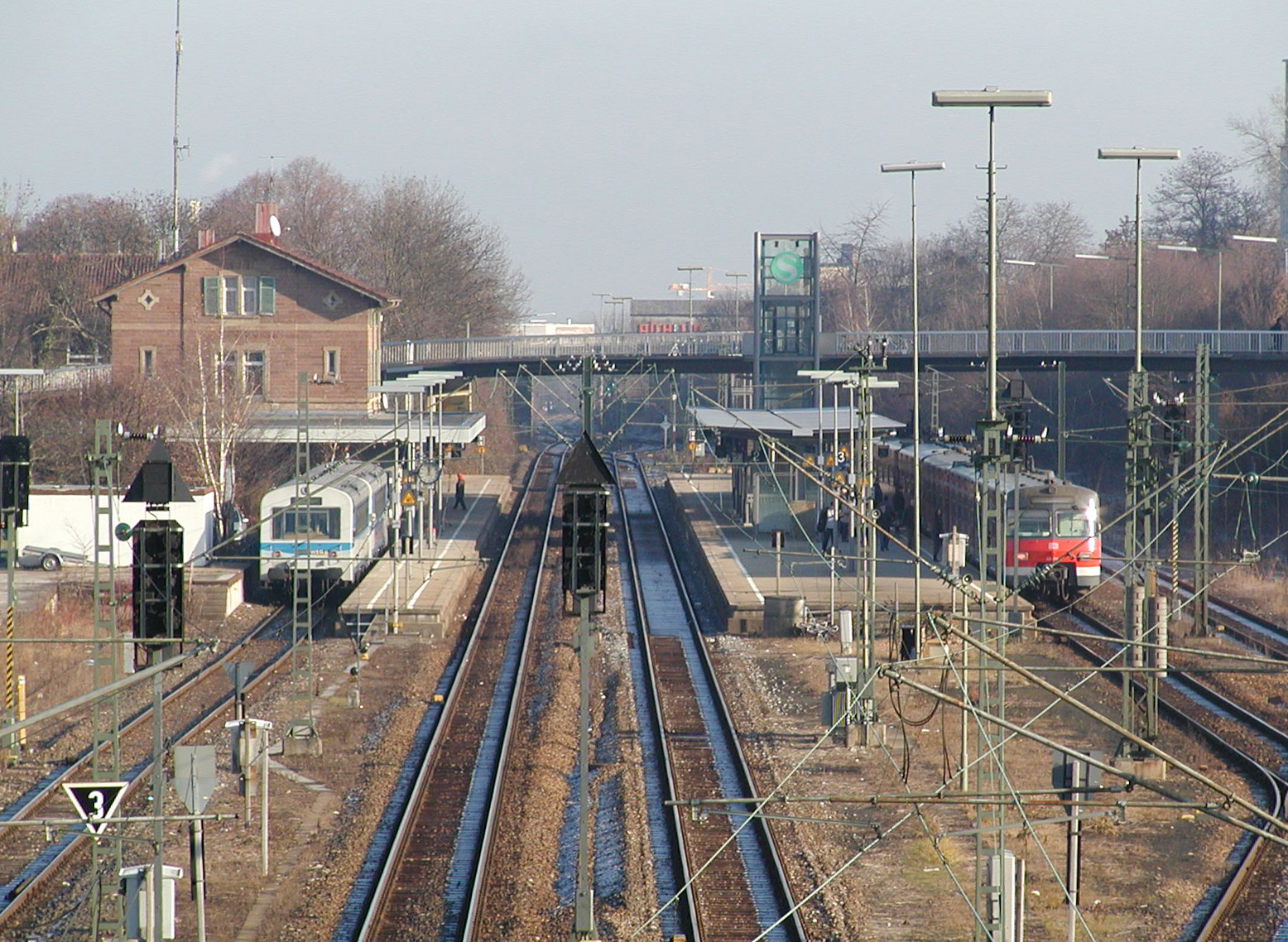
Korntal station

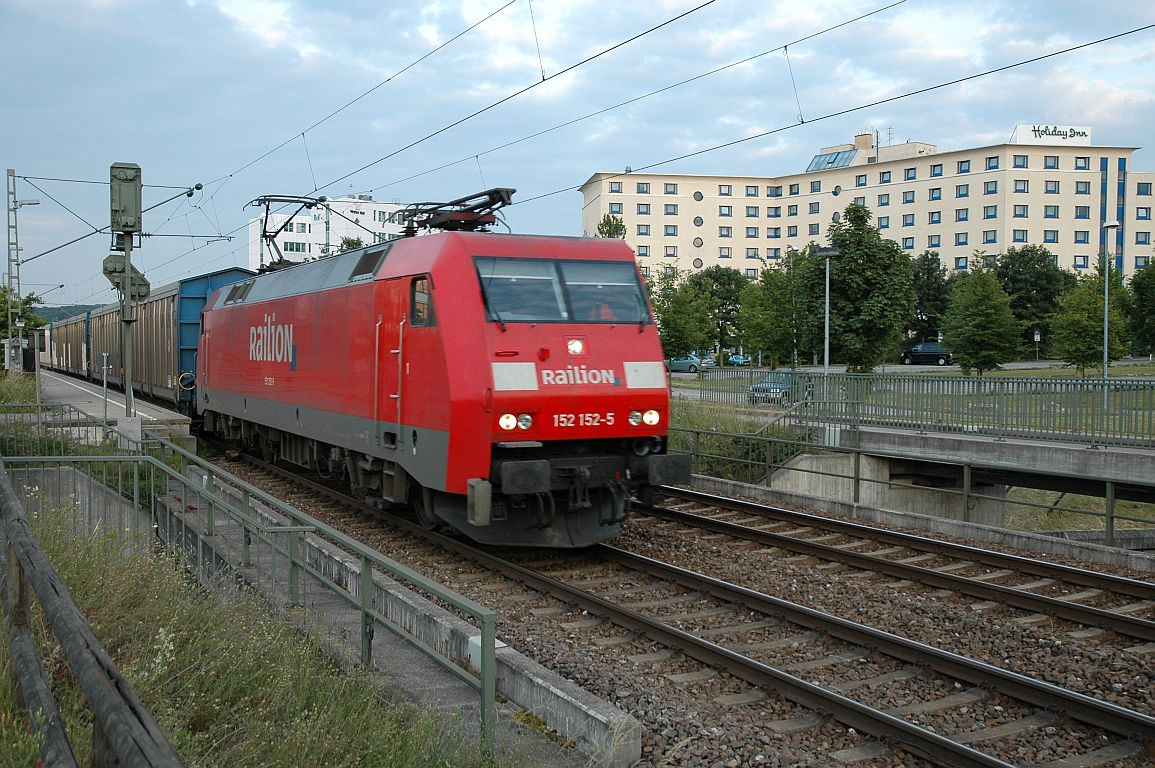
A freight train passes through Weilimdorf station

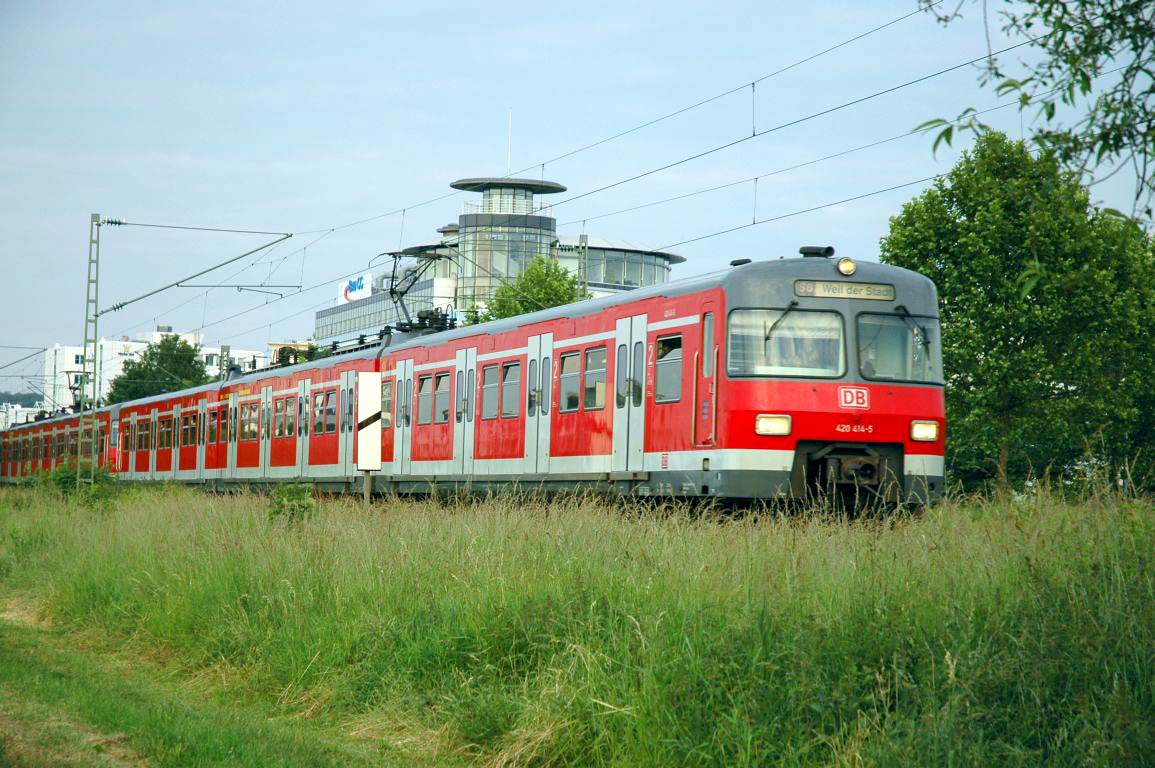
S-Bahn train running towards Weil der Stadt just after Stuttgart-Weilimdorf halt

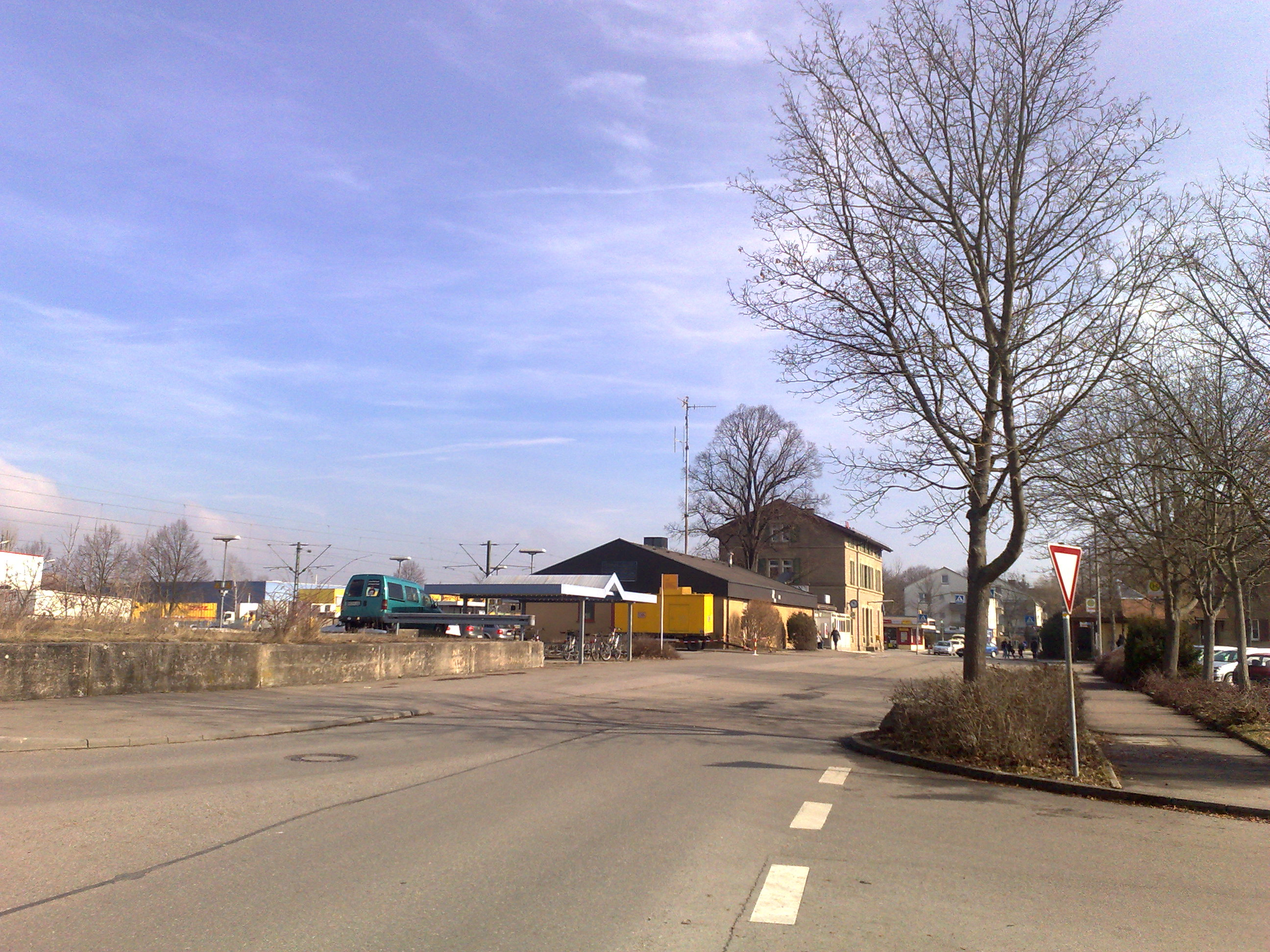
Renningen station

==== Weil der Stadt–Calw: stagnation and closure ====
After the electrification of the Stuttgart-Weil section of the city, steam locomotives were initially used on the remaining section between Weil der Stadt and Calw. Class VT 98 rail buses, which are similar to Uerdingen railbuses, were also used from 1953 and these took over all the services on the line a few years later. The second track was removed between Calw and Althengstett in 1963.

Passenger traffic ended in 1983. Deutsche Bundesbahn sought legal permission to close freight operations on this section on 16 July 1986. The volume of traffic was estimated at that time to be 220 wagons per year, while the investment required to maintain operations on the line was approximately DM 1 million. In 1988, freight traffic was closed as the result of a landslide in the Forst Tunnel near Althengstett. The track work fell into disrepair, and the line was formally closed, with effect from 1 September 1995. The track work of this section is protected as a monument and is still dedicated to operation as a railway.

The efforts of a society founded in December 1987, Verein zur Erhaltung der Württembergischen Schwarzwaldbahn ("Association for the preservation of the Württemberg Black Forest Railway", WSB, called since 2009 Verein Württembergische Schwarzwaldbahn Calw–Weil der Stadt, "Association for the Württemberg Black Forest Railway Calw-Weil der Stadt") led to the purchase of the section through the Calw district in 1994. In order to legalise the transfer of the line, Deutsche Bahn abandoned it for public transport purposes on 31 August 1995 and it appears in the list of disused lines of the Federal Railway Authority (Eisenbahnbundesamt). With the same date of effect (1 September 1995), the state of Baden-Württemberg granted the Calw district, at its request, a concession for the operation of a non-public access railway for 20 years (a decision of the state Ministry of Transport, dated 22 August 1995). As a result, rail operations can be formally resumed as soon as the line is made operational.

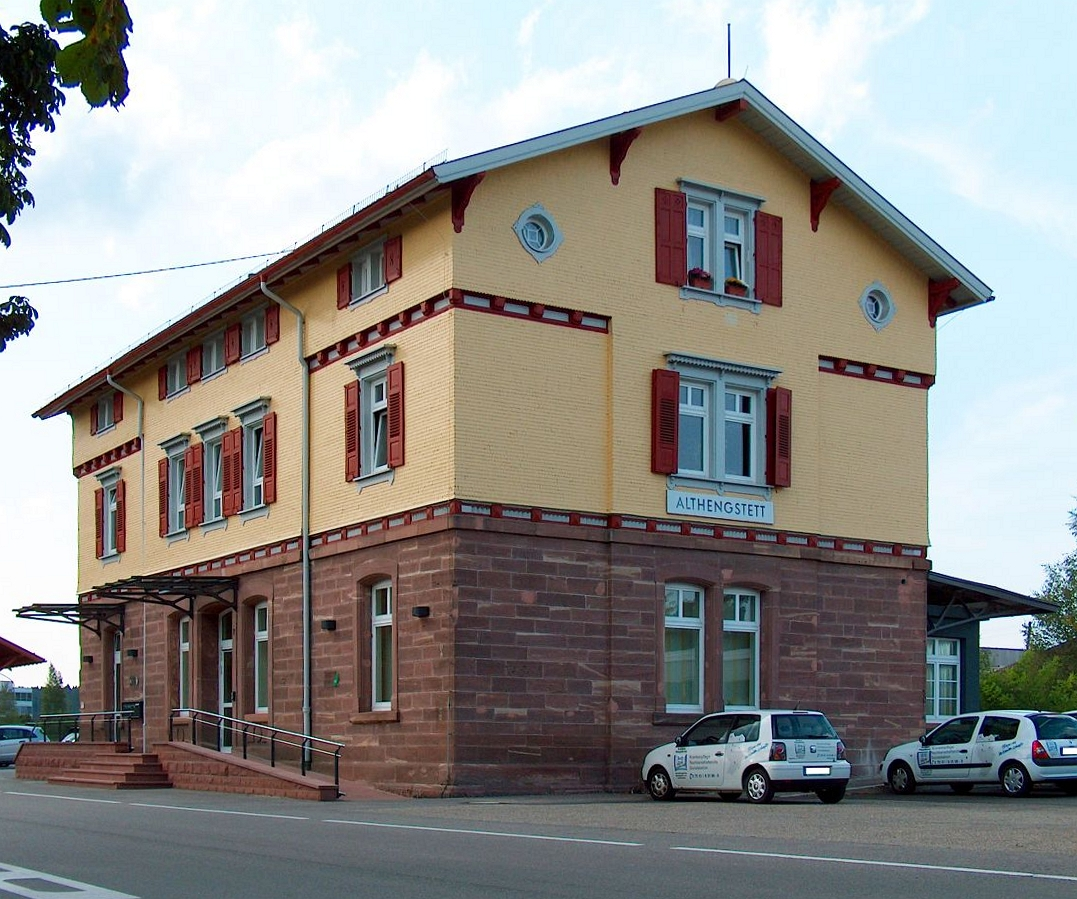
Althengstett station

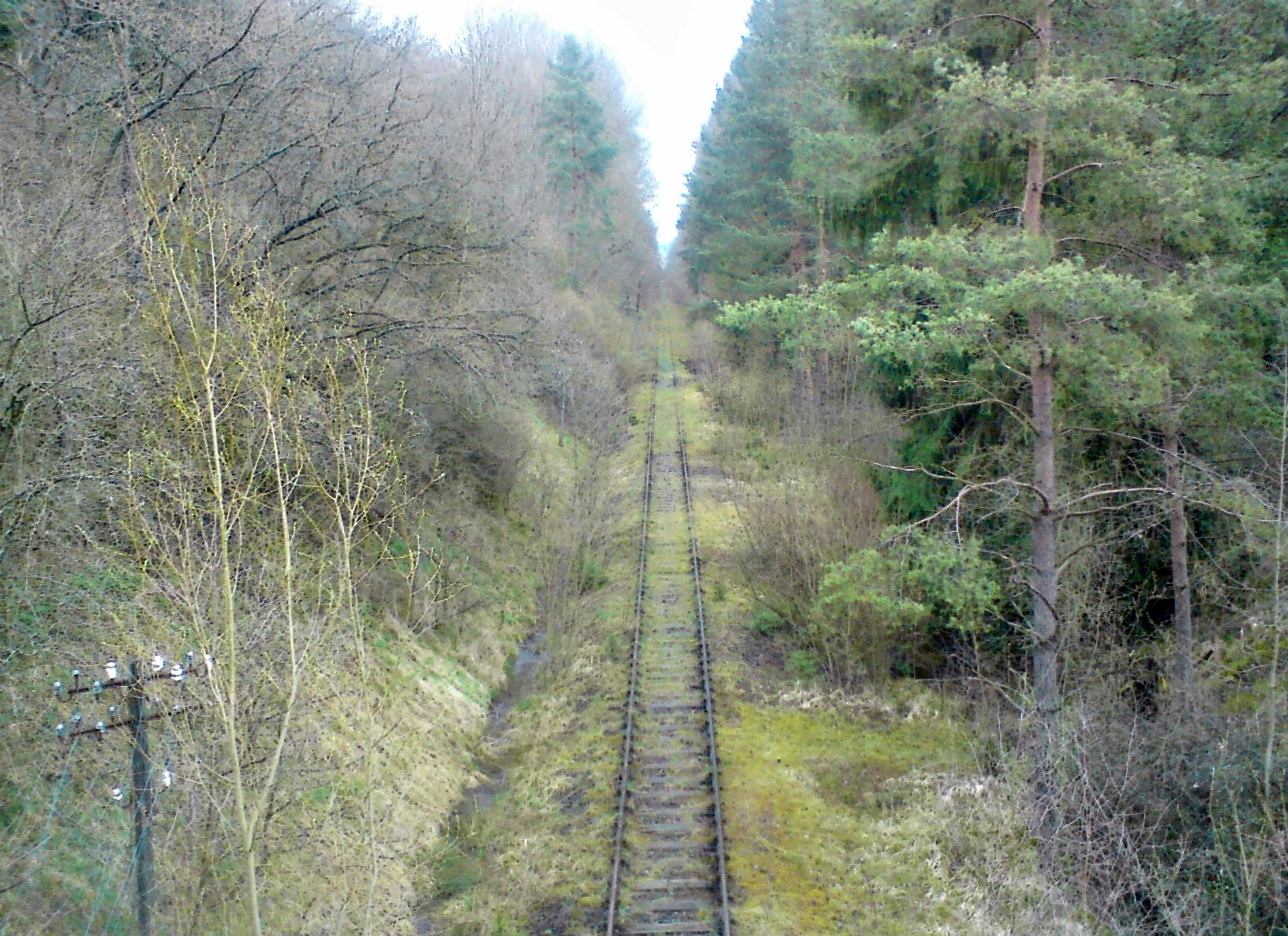
The Feldhütte cutting between Althengstett and Calw

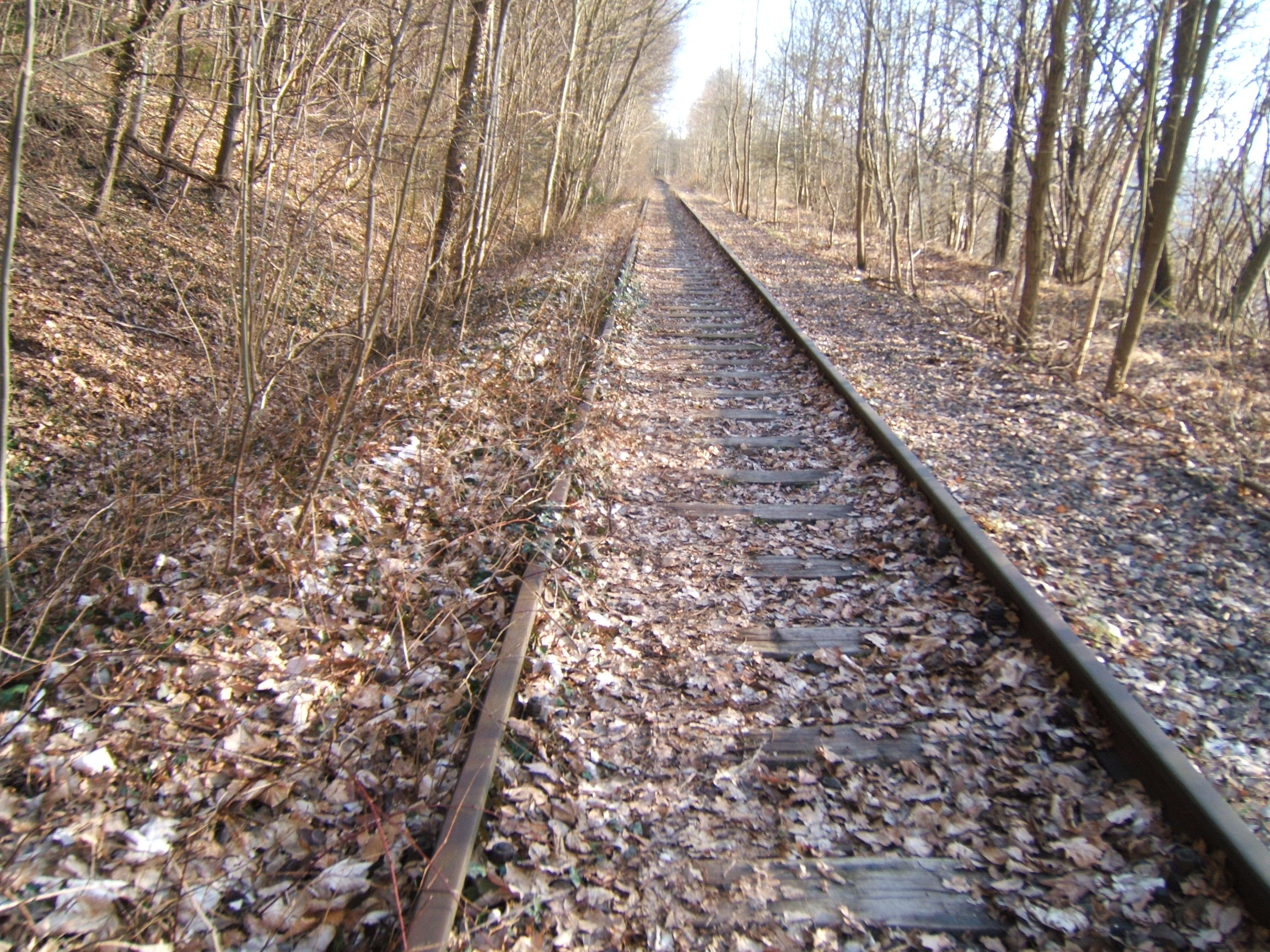
Route above Calw

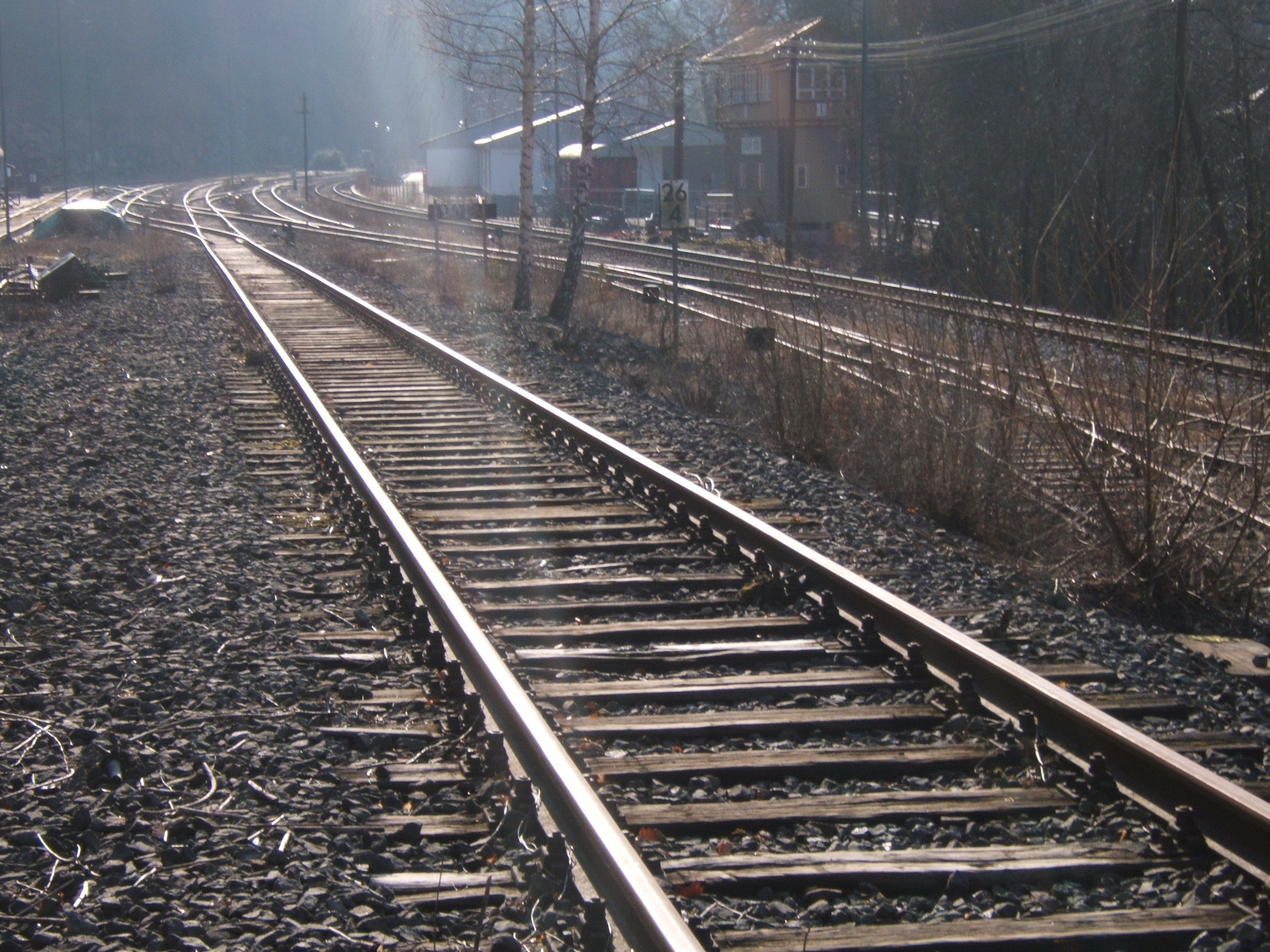
End of the Black Forest Railway in old Calw station

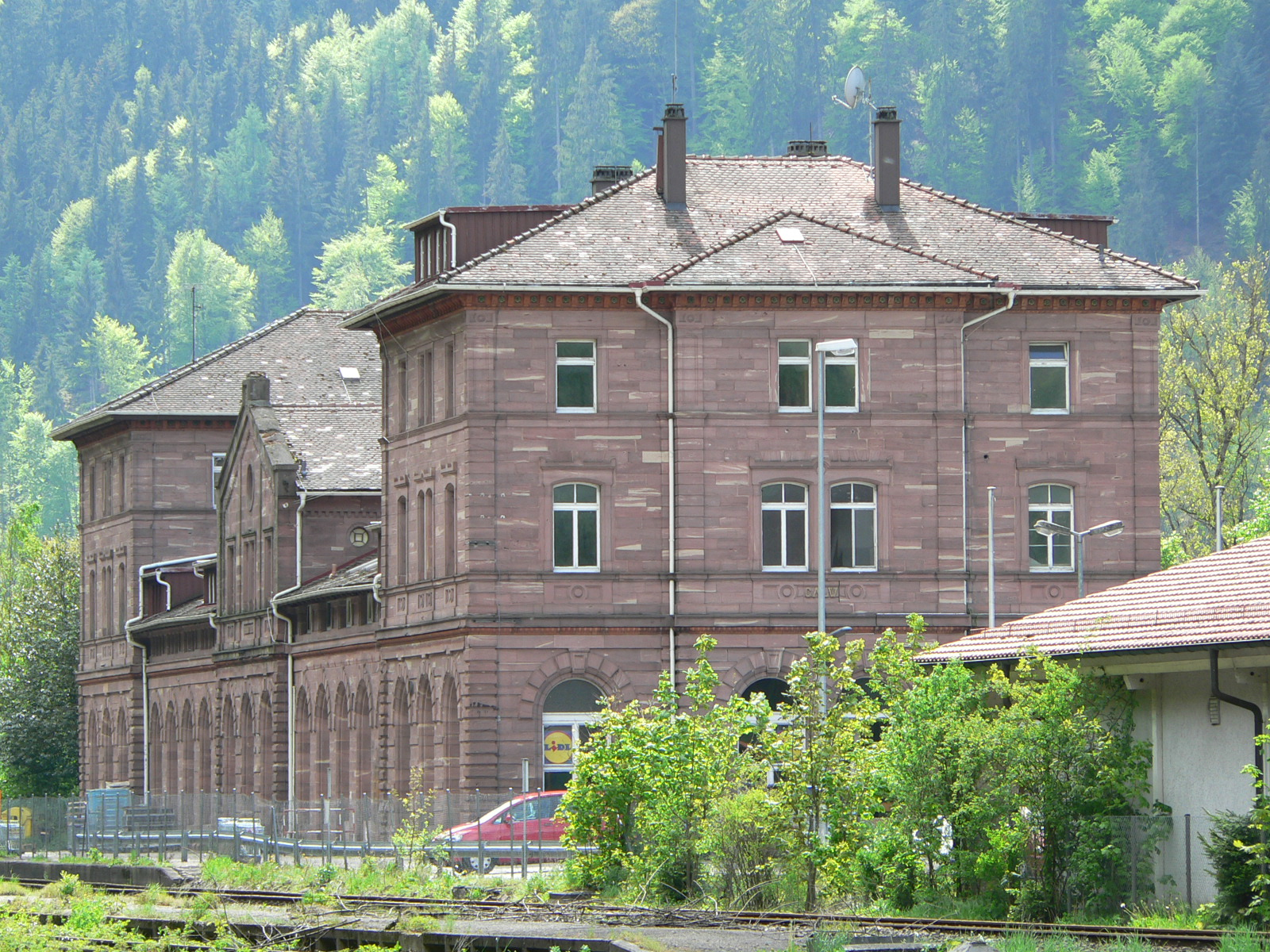
Old entrance building in Calw

== Planning ==
=== Line planning by Heimerl ===
In 1988, the Stuttgart traffic scientist Gerhard Heimerl, in response for a request for an expert opinion, designed several route studies for a Stadtbahn connection between Calw and Böblingen. This would have used the western section of the Black Forest Railway to Schafhausen and the southern section of Rankbach Railway, linked by a new section. The Rankbach Railway would have been reached in the northern route option I at Magstadt and in the middle option II at Maichingen. The southern route option III would have passed through Darmsheim and Dagersheim to Sindelfingen.

=== Campaign for the reactivation of the Weil der Stadt–Calw section ===
After the purchase of the line in 1994, the district of Calw considered the reactivation of passenger traffic and found support in the district of Böblingen. Various studies on behalf of the district of Calw (a feasibility study, a benefit-cost analysis and a consequential costs study) turned out positive. In 2008, both bodies decided to proceed with further planning for the reactivation of the line, with the goal of commissioning it in 2015.

An updated benefit-cost analysis, this time involving the possible extension of the Stuttgart S-Bahn from Weil der Stadt on the disused section to Calw was tested as an alternative to diesel or light rail options, resulted in the extension of the S-Bahn system having by far the highest benefit cost ratio BCR of 2.01, followed by the option of an isolated operation with light rail vehicles with a benefit cost factor of 1.45 and the diesel-powered railway with a BCR of 1.22. Subsequently, therefore, the option of an S-Bahn extension was pursued in particular.

A re-examination in May 2011 showed the project would have poor cost-effectiveness. However, the project's supporters doubt these numbers.

In June 2012, the district of Calw took the decision that only a shuttle service to the S-Bahn would run from Calw to Weil der Stadt to Renningen under the name of Hermann-Hesse-Bahn. According to a press release, further research has shown that the first threshold, a positive cost-benefit ratio, would be met. The investments would amount to about €50 million. The district of Calw hopes for support from the state government with funding of up to 75 percent, but under current policy, state funding rate is limited to 50 percent. Currently, a concept is being developed to show how the district can raise its own share of at least €10 million. It is planned to run a service every half-hour until at least 20:00.

The Hermann-Hesse-Bahn would run from Calw via the stations of Calw ZOB, Calw Heumaden, Althengstett, Ostelsheim, Weil der Stadt and Renningen. This would not only provide a direct connection to the S 6 towards Stuttgart, but would also make possible interchange with the S 60 to Böblingen in Renningen. So far, however, the district of Calw has not presented any concrete figures for the cost-benefit calculation. An upgrade to allow S-Bahn operations would cost about 50 percent more than provided in this concept and so the benefit-cost ratio would be below the eligibility limit of 1.0.

Integration into the fare system of the VVS is planned, but with a separate ticket, which should also be valid for the Stuttgart S-Bahn network.

After completion of the "standardised evaluation", the Calw district released funds for the tendering of the required planning services amounting to an estimated €2.4 million in October 2013. The aim was to obtain the formal planning approval by the end of 2014, with completion scheduled for 2019 at the latest. In May 2014, Winfried Hermann announced on behalf of the "green/red" state government that the state would fund 50% of the costs of re-activating the Hermann-Hesse-Bahn to the district of Calw.

The re-commissioning would take place in two stages: first, starting in 2018, diesel railcars are to be operated between Calw and Renningen. In a second stage of operation, fuel cell vehicles (LINT) would be used or the S 6 would be extended from Weil der Stadt to Calw. A benefit-cost analysis for the S-Bahn extension is being funded by the VRS and the districts of Böblingen and Calw, with each providing a third.

For the management of operations, the Albtal-Verkehrs-Gesellschaft (AVG) won a Europe-wide tender with the cheapest bid. For 15 years, the AVG, as railway infrastructure provider, will control the signals of the Hermann-Hesse-Bahn and maintain the state's own infrastructure. It was to assume actual operations when the Hermann-Hesse-Bahn starts operation in December 2018. Until then, the AVG would advise the district on the planning.

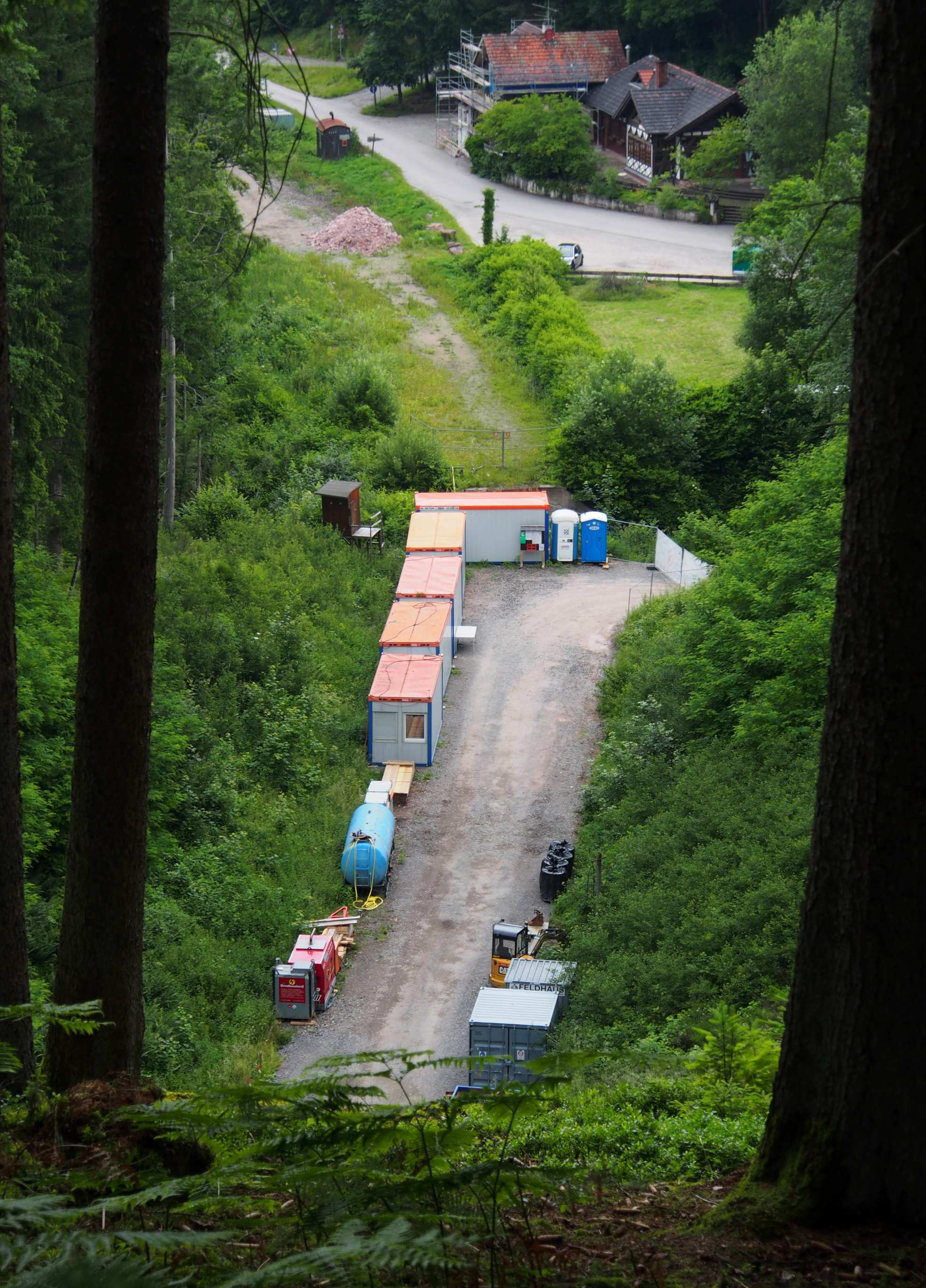
In 2021, rebuilding the Tälesbach section has just commenced.

In September 2017, it was announced that the reopening would be postponed until December 2020 because of many legal disputes, especially in relation to nature conservation.

In February 2026, the section was finally reopened as regional rail route RB76.

=== Route realignment ===
In order to be able to run in the peak hours at 30-minute intervals, the construction of a double-track section is provided at Ostelsheim so that trains can meet on the otherwise single-track route. At Schafhausen, the line is to run through the Hacksberg (mountain) in a new tunnel, in order to avoid the detour via the loop there and thus shorten the travel time. The construction of such a tunnel, however, makes a steep ramp with an incline of around 4.0% in the area of the tunnel inevitable and only high-powered trains will be able use the reactivated part of the line. This section will then not be usable by freight trains.

=== Testing of ETCS for the S-Bahn ===
On 27 January 2017, the University of Stuttgart, Thales and DB Netz AG submitted a funding application to the Federal Ministry of Transport and Digital Infrastructure to test the suitability of ETCS Level 2 between Renningen and Weil der Stadt. At least 50 percent of the project costs of €2.6 million must be raised by the applicants. For this purpose an S-Bahn train and a diesel railcar from Thales (NE 81) are to be converted. A decision on whether to equip the Stuttgart S-Bahn with ETCS was expected to be taken in 2017.
