= Stuttgart-Zuffenhausen station =

Railway station in Stuttgart, Germany

Stuttgart Zuffenhausen
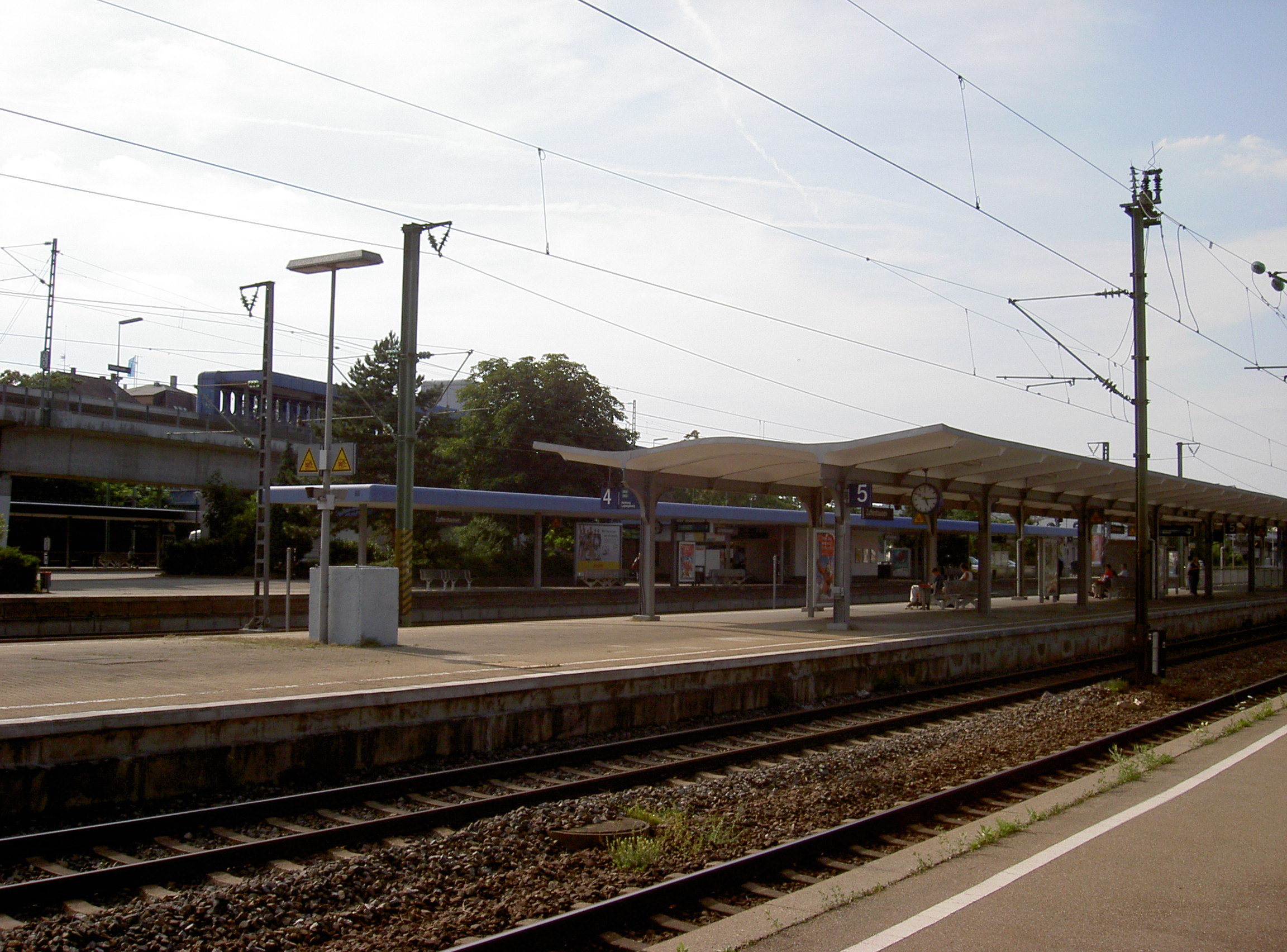

General information
- Location: Am Bahnhof 1, Zuffenhausen, BW; Germany
- Coordinates: 48°49′45″N 9°10′0″E
- Lines: Franconia Railway (KBS 780, KBS 790.4-5); Black Forest Railway (KBS 790.6, KBS 790.61); Mannheim–Stuttgart (KBS 770, KBS 771); access track to Kornwestheim marshalling yard; Feuerbach Industrial Railway
- Platforms: 6

Construction
- Accessible: Yes

Other information
- Station code: 6090
- DS100 code: TSZ
- IBNR: 8005778
- Category: 3
- Fare zone: : 1
- Website: www.bahnhof.de

History
- Opened: 15 October 1846; 179 years ago
- Electrified: 15 May 1939; 87 years ago

Services
Preceding station	Stuttgart S-Bahn	Following station
Stuttgart-Feuerbach towards Schwabstraße	S4	Kornwestheim Pbf towards Backnang
Stuttgart-Feuerbach towards Schwabstraße	S5	Kornwestheim Pbf towards Bietigheim-Bissingen
Stuttgart-Feuerbach towards Schwabstraße	S6	Neuwirtshaus (Porscheplatz) towards Weil der Stadt
Stuttgart-Feuerbach towards Schwabstraße	S60	Neuwirtshaus (Porscheplatz) towards Böblingen
Location

Zuffenhausen station is a railway station of the Stuttgart S-Bahn in Zuffenhausen in the city of Stuttgart, in the German state of Baden-Württemberg. With its six platform tracks, it is one of the largest stations in Stuttgart.

== History ==
Zuffenhausen station was opened by the Royal Württemberg State Railways on 15 October 1846. It was built as part of the Central Railway (Centralbahn) between Stuttgart and Ludwigsburg and had a one-story station building. Apart from passengers from Zuffenhausen, it was used especially for travellers to the neighbouring village of Korntal. In 1852 the State Railways, built a second track on the Northern Railway between Stuttgart and Bietigheim.

From the early 1860s, the State Railways planned a line from Stuttgart to the Northern Black Forest. After long controversy over a route via Böblingen or via Zuffenhausen, the Württemberg parliament (Landtag) approved on 13 August 1865 a route for the Black Forest Railway that branched off the Northern Railway in Zuffenhausen and ran via Leonberg and Weil der Stadt to Calw. The first section was opened between Zuffenhausen and Ditzingen on 23 September 1868. It took almost four years for the line to be completed. In 1868, Carl Julius Abel built a new, larger station building adequate for the increased ridership. It had a three-story front building connected to a two-storey extension. At its southern end was single-story waiting room. A restaurant was established for passengers waiting to transfer between trains. In addition, a freight shed, a locomotive shed and workshop were added.

Meanwhile, the town began to industrialise. In 1868 it had a cotton factory, a brick factory and an oil mill. Later Zuffenhausen became known for its furniture manufacturing. The town rapidly increased in population to over 10,000, and it was proclaimed a city on 23 April 1907.

In 1907, the parliament approved the upgrade of the line to four tracks between Stuttgart Hauptbahnhof and Ludwigsburg. In May 1925, the section between Feuerbach and the 12 km post (south of Kornwestheim station) was completed. The Great Depression hit Zuffenhausen particularly hard and led to a sharp decline in tax revenues. The city agreed to be annexed by Stuttgart, with effect from 1 April 1931. A month later, the station was renamed Stuttgart-Zuffenhausen.

Electrification of two tracks for suburban railway services began on 15 May 1933 between Stuttgart and Ludwigsburg.

In 1973 the new SpDr-L60 signal box became operational.

Deutsche Bundesbahn rebuilt the station for the Stuttgart S-Bahn. Its remaining 19th century buildings disappeared. In 1980 the old station building was demolished and replaced by the current station opened in 1982. It was one of a small number of stations in Württemberg that had survived World War II to be later demolished and replaced.

== Railway operations ==
Zuffenhausen station is a railway junction. The Black Forest Railway branches off the Franconia Railway here. The Franconia Railway tracks are platform tracks 2 to 6. S-Bahn trains towards Stuttgart Hauptbahnhof use track 2. S-Bahn trains towards Ludwigsburg use track 4. Tracks 3, 5 and 6 are used by mainline trains.

Platform 11 is an elevated platform located on a bridge running above the station and is connected by a path to Schwieberdinger Straße. Platform 11 is used by S-Bahn trains towards Leonberg. Track 12 serves S-Bahn services towards Stuttgart. It also served individual services of the Württemberg Railway Company (Württembergische Eisenbahn-Gesellschaft) running between Feuerbach and Weissach until 2012.

Zuffenhausen station is classified by Deutsche Bahn as a category 3 station.

The Zuffenhausen interlocking is a relay interlocking of class DrL60.

=== S-Bahn ===
Line	Route
S 4	Backnang – Marbach – Ludwigsburg – Zuffenhausen – Hauptbahnhof – Schwabstraße
S 5	Bietigheim – Ludwigsburg – Zuffenhausen – Hauptbahnhof – Schwabstraße
S 6	Weil der Stadt – Renningen – Leonberg – Zuffenhausen – Hauptbahnhof – Schwabstraße (additional services in the peak between Leonberg and Schwabstraße)
S 60	Böblingen – Sindelfingen – Magstadt – Renningen – Leonberg – Zuffenhausen – Hauptbahnhof – Schwabstraße
