= Stuttgart-Feuerbach station =

Railway station in Stuttgart, Germany

Stuttgart Feuerbach
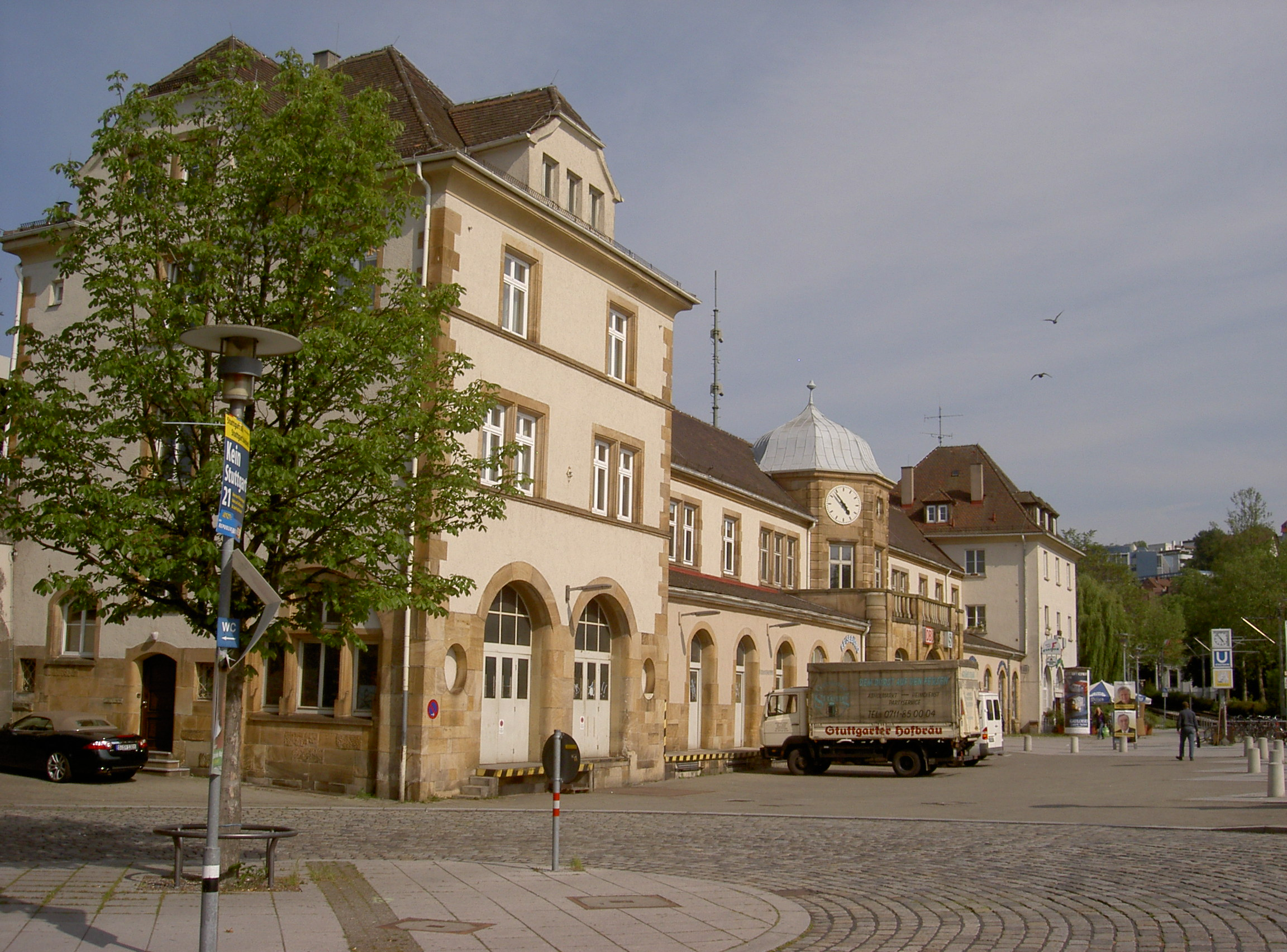

General information
- Location: Wiener Platz 2, Feuerbach, BW; Germany
- Coordinates: 48°48′49″N 9°10′8″E
- Owner: DB Netz
- Operator: DB Station&Service
- Lines: Franconia Railway (KBS 790.4–6)
- Platforms: 1 island platform 1 side platform
- Tracks: 4
- Train operators: S-Bahn Stuttgart
- Connections: U6 U13

Construction
- Accessible: Yes

Other information
- Station code: 6078
- DS100 code: TSFE
- IBNR: 8005770
- Category: 4
- Fare zone: : 1
- Website: www.bahnhof.de

History
- Opened: 15 October 1846

Services
| Preceding station | Stuttgart S-Bahn | Following station |
|---|---|---|
| Nord towards Schwabstraße | S4 | Zuffenhausen towards Backnang |
| Nord towards Schwabstraße | S5 | Zuffenhausen towards Bietigheim-Bissingen |
| Nord towards Schwabstraße | S6 | Zuffenhausen towards Weil der Stadt |
| Nord towards Schwabstraße | S60 | Zuffenhausen towards Böblingen |
Location

Feuerbach station is an S-Bahn station in the Stuttgart borough of Feuerbach in the German state of Baden-Württemberg. It is on the Franconia Railway. The station is classified by Deutsche Bahn as a category 4 station and is classified as a haltepunkt (halt) because it now has no operable sets of points.

== History ==
Feuerbach station was opened by the Royal Württemberg State Railways (German: Königlich Württembergische Staatsbahn) along with the Central Railway (Centralbahn) from Stuttgart to Ludwigsburg on 15 October 1846. It is one of the oldest stations in Württemberg. At that time it was about a kilometre outside the village, along the road towards Cannstatt. The old one-story station building was erected about 200 metres from the Prag Tunnel.

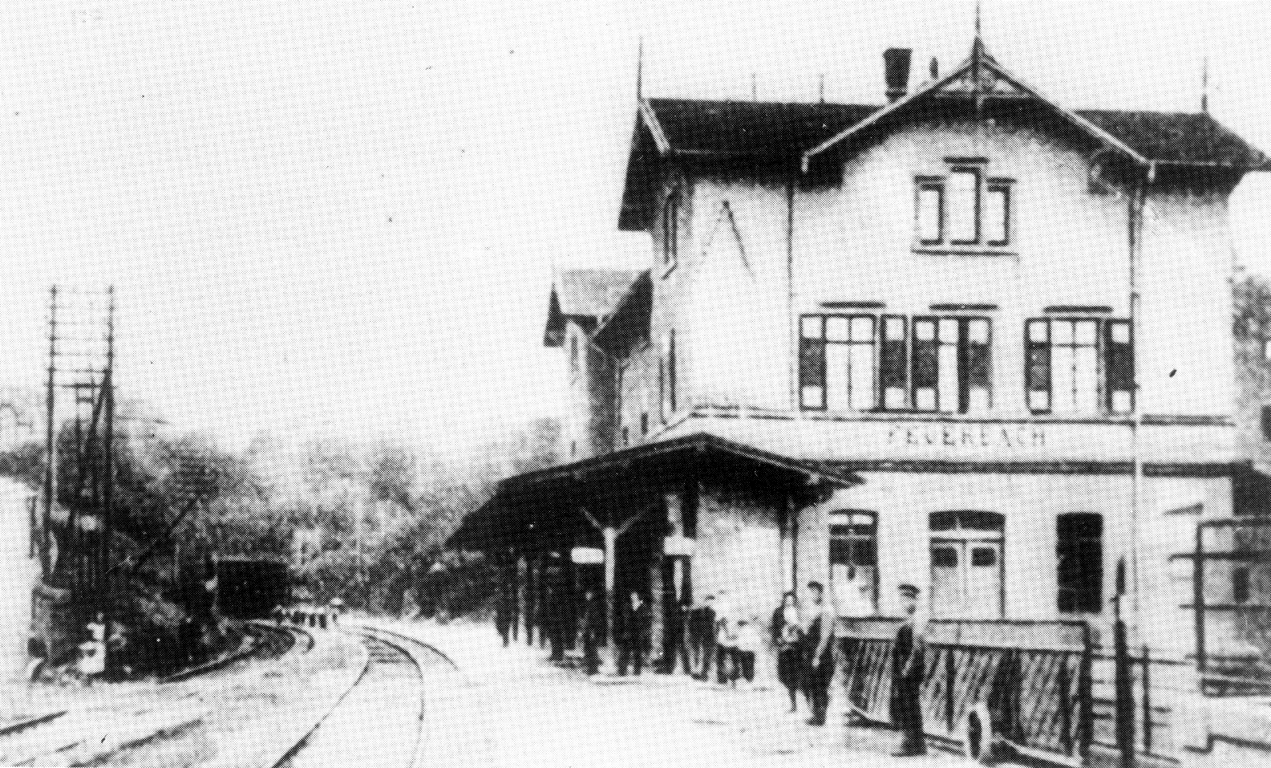
Feuerbach station after reconstruction in 1871–1872 with the Prag Tunnel in the background

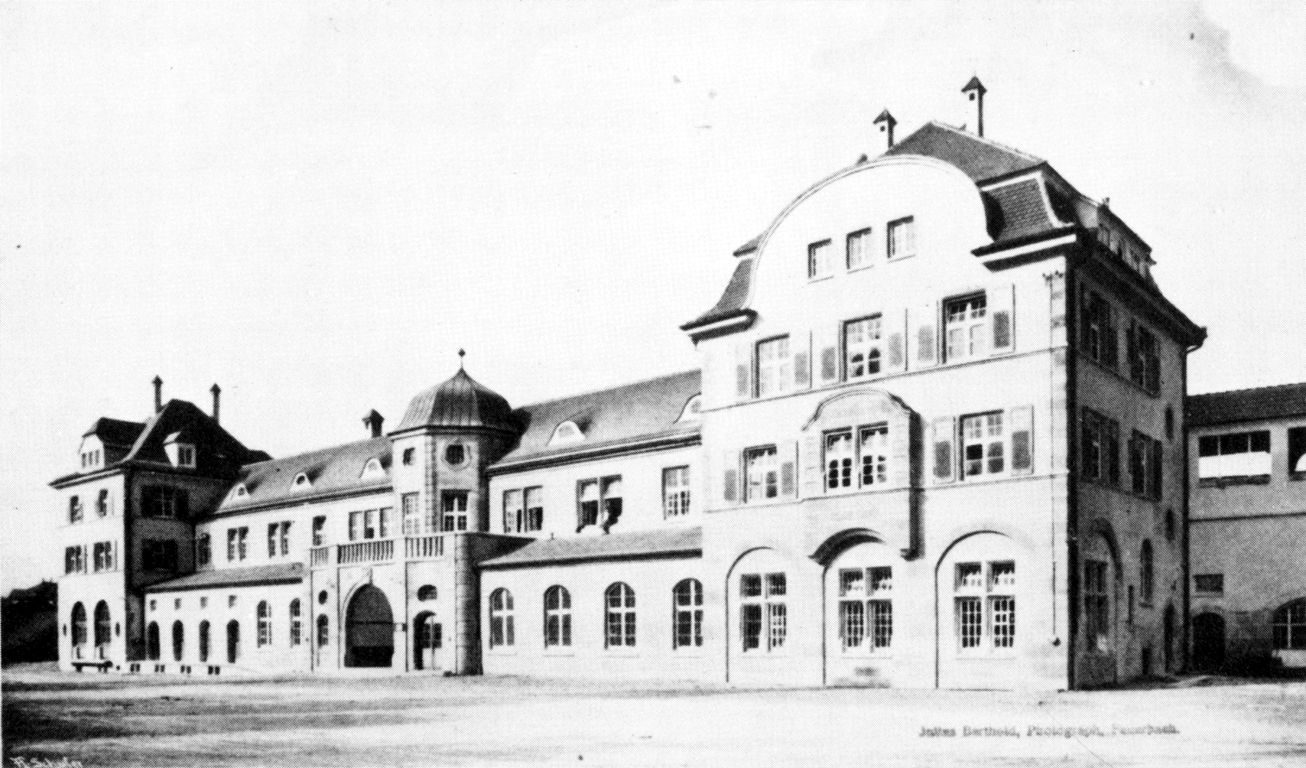
Station building from 1909, town side

In 1852, a second track was completed on the Northern Railway between Stuttgart and Bietigheim. Industrialisation had begun in the former wine-growing community of Feuerbach. In 1864, the Jobst company established its first major plant for the production of quinine. In 1871 and 1872 the first extensions were added to the station. Another floor was added to the entrance building and a large freight yard was built. In the late 19th century the station was one of the busiest in Württemberg.

The volume of passenger and freight traffic continued to grow. More large companies, such as Leitz and Bosch (1910), were established. On 15 March 1907, the government gave Feuerbach a charter as a city as its population had risen to about 12,000. The little station could no longer cope with its traffic and needed alterations. A larger entrance building and freight yard were required. The planning and management of construction were provided by the administration of the State Railways, while the Stuttgart-based architects firm of Bihl & Woltz was commissioned to design the facade. In 1909, the modern station building was inaugurated. The building was planned so that passengers could enter from the station forecourt at ground level. The platforms were raised to the first floor level. This design was new in Württemberg.

The building consists of a long two-storey central building with two three-story wings. In the middle is the entrance and above it there is a small tower with two clocks.

On 26 May 1929, Deutsche Reichsbahn completed the quadruplication of the line between Stuttgart Central Station and Feuerbach. On 1 May 1933, Feuerbach was annexed by the city of Stuttgart. The electrification of two tracks for suburban operations between Stuttgart Central Station and Ludwigsburg began on 15 May 1933. The station was renamed Stuttgart-Feuerbach on 1 June 1933.

=== Restructuring as part of Stuttgart 21 ===
As part of the Stuttgart 21 project the Feuerbach tunnel will be built to the south of the station, surfacing near Kruppstraße. The new line will rise up a ramp in the station and connect to the mainline tracks to its north. During construction the two long-distance platform tracks and the eastern outer platform will be demolished. A new pedestrian underpass will be built to a new platform. Then the new tracks will be built through the station. Rail operations will be maintained throughout the work.

== Rail operations ==
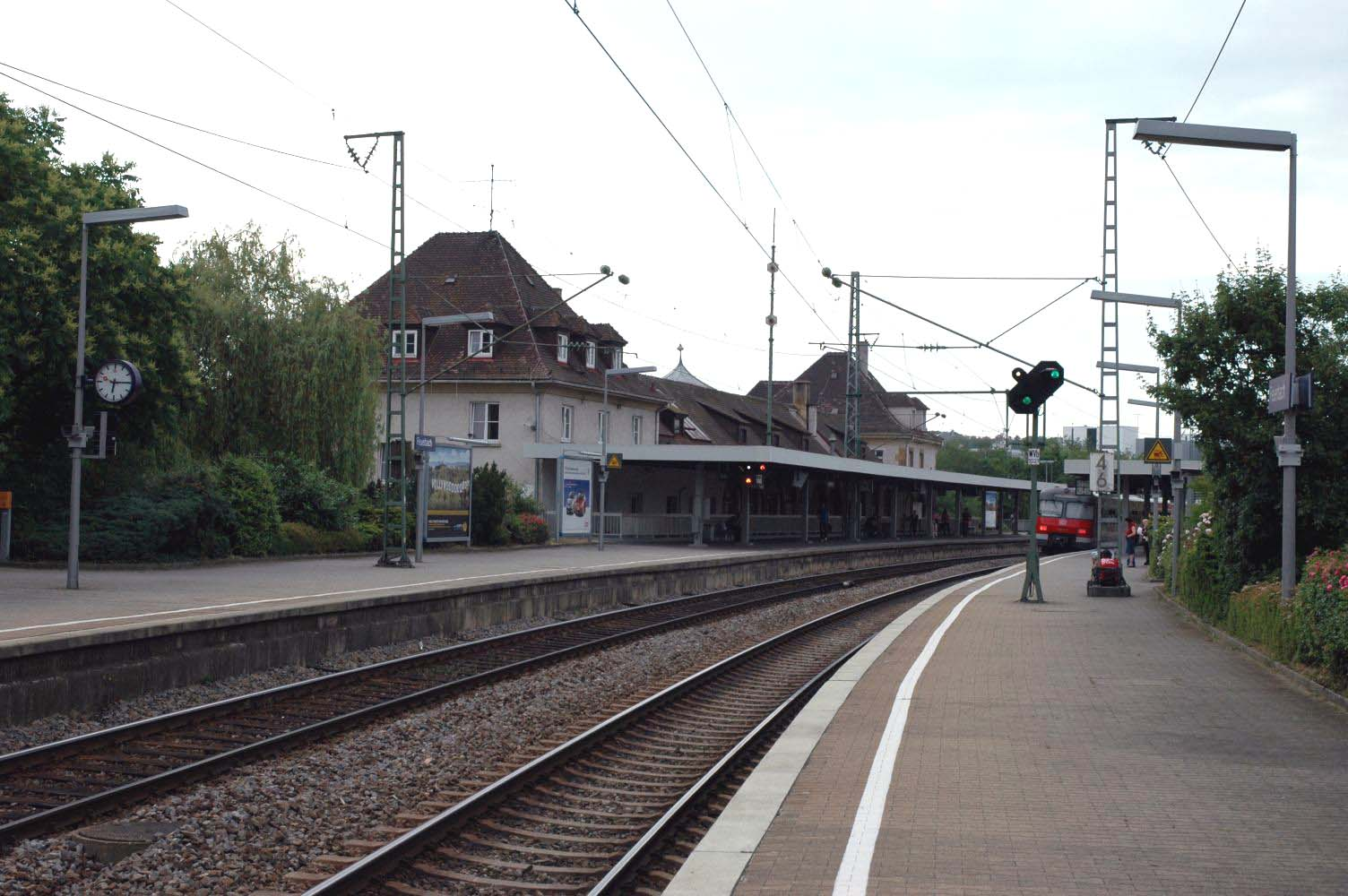
S-Bahn platform and station building (June 2006)

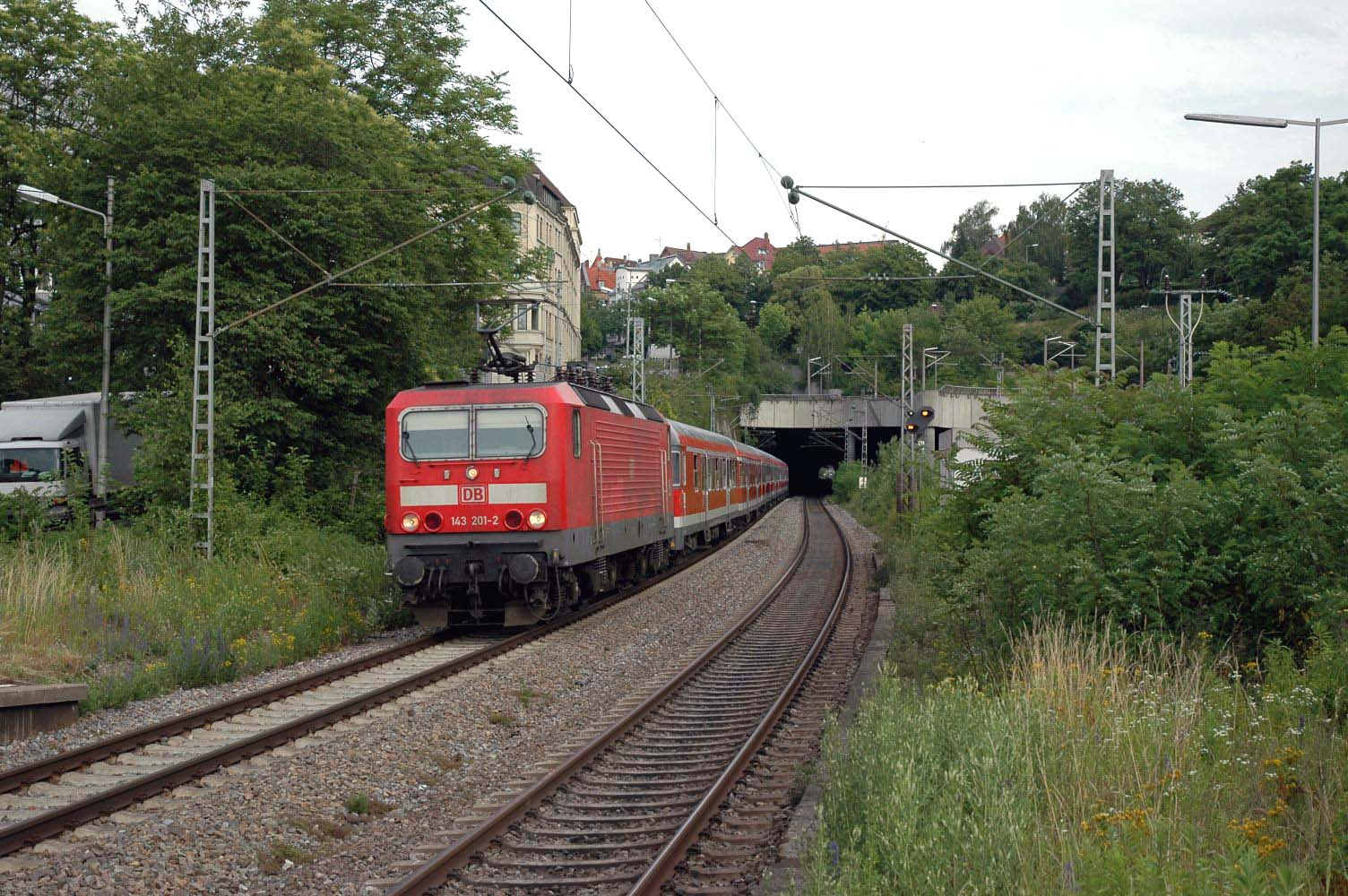
Regionalbahn train on the long-distance tracks (June 2006)

The station has four through tracks and a bay platform. Track 1 is used by the S-Bahn from Stuttgart central station and track 2 by the S-Bahn towards Zuffenhausen. Tracks 3 and 4 serve long-distance traffic. Services of the Württembergische Eisenbahn-Gesellschaft (Württemberg Railway Company) bound for the Strohgäu Railway start on track 1a (the bay track) during peak hours. The station is classified by Deutsche Bahn as a category 4 station.

=== S-Bahn ===
| Line | Route |
|---|---|
| S 4 | Backnang – Marbach – Ludwigsburg – Zuffenhausen – Feuerbach – Hauptbahnhof – Schwabstraße |
| S 5 | Bietigheim – Ludwigsburg – Zuffenhausen – Feuerbach – Hauptbahnhof – Schwabstraße |
| S 6 | Weil der Stadt – Renningen – Leonberg – Zuffenhausen – Feuerbach – Hauptbahnhof – Schwabstraße (additional services in the peak between Leonberg and Schwabstraße) |
| S 60 | Böblingen – Sindelfingen – Magstadt – Renningen – Leonberg – Feuerbach – Zuffenhausen – Hauptbahnhof – Schwabstraße |

=== Regional Transport ===
| Line | Route |
|---|---|
| WEG R61 | (Feuerbach – Zuffenhausen –) Korntal – Hemmingen – Heimerdingen – Weissach |

=== Stadtbahn ===
The terminus of the Feuerbach Municipal Tramway (Städtische Straßenbahn Feuerbach) was formerly located in the station forecourt. Today lines U 6 and U 13 of the Stuttgart Stadtbahn stop at Wiener Platz at the north-western end of the station.

| Line | Route (1435 mm gauge) |
|---|---|
| U6 | Gerlingen – Weilimdorf – Feuerbach – Hauptbahnhof – Degerloch – Möhringen (– Fasanenhof) |
| U13 | (Giebel –) Feuerbach – Pfostenwäldle – Pragsattel – Bad Cannstatt – Hedelfingen; Only between Feuerbach and Hedelfingen during school holidays and off-peak. |
