= Bavarian EP 5 =

German electric passenger locomotive

Bavarian EP 5 DRG Class E 52 DB Class 152
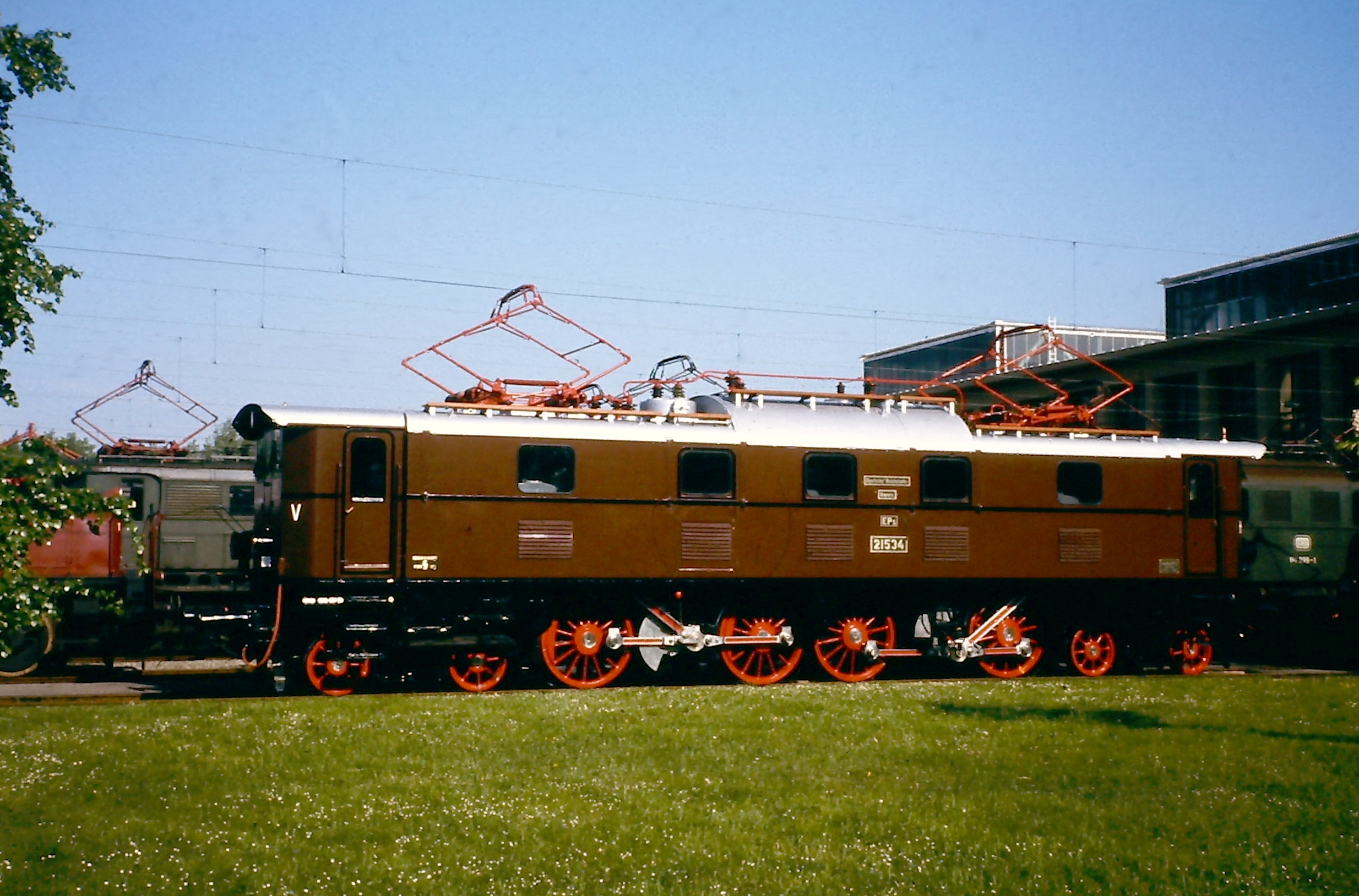
- EP 5 21534 in the Munich
Type and origin
- Builder: WASSEG, Maffei
- Build date: 1924–1925
- Total produced: 35
Specifications
- Configuration
  - UIC: 2'B B2'
- Gauge: 1,435 mm (4 ft 8 1/2 in)
- Length
  - Over beams: 17,210 mm (56 ft 5 1/2 in)
- Axle load: 19.6 t (19.3 long tons; 21.6 short tons)
- Service weight: 140.0 t (137.8 long tons; 154.3 short tons)
- Electric system/s: 15 kV 16 2/3 Hz AC
- Current pickup(s): Catenary
- Traction motors: 4
- Transmission: Side rod drive
- Loco brake: Compressed-air brake
- Train protection: Dead man’s handle
Performance figures
- Maximum speed: 90 km/h (56 mph)
- Power output
  - 1 hour: 2,990 PS (2,200 kW; 2,950 hp)
  - Continuous: 2,260 PS (1,660 kW; 2,230 hp)
- Power index: 21.3 PS/t (15.7 kW/t)
- Tractive effort
  - Starting: 196 kN (44,000 lbf)
Career
- Numbers: EP 5 21 501–535; DRG E 52 01–35; DB 152 001–035
- Retired: 1973

The Bavarian Class EP 5 (from 1927: DRG Class E 52) was an electric locomotive used for heavy passenger train services with the Deutsche Reichsbahn (DRG) and Deutsche Bundesbahn (DB).

The first procurement programme for new locomotives set up by the Bavarian Group Administration of the Deutsche Reichsbahn included plans for an electric locomotive for heavy passenger train duties on electrified lines in Bavaria. From the numerous designs put forward, it was decided to opt for a 2'BB2' locomotive, which would be fitted with the same motors as another electric goods train locomotive in the programme, the DRG Class E 91.

This new design departed from the previous approach of building electric locomotives with a slow running, large motor and went for four smaller electric motors. The drive was divided into two groups within a single frame. Each group had two motors, that drove a common countershaft using cogs. The countershaft drove a jackshaft via inclined driving rods which was coupled to two driving axles with coupling rods. In order to ensure that the permitted axle load was not exceeded the engines were given a leading and trailing bogie. The locomotive body with its two driver's cabs was built on the frame. The vehicle components were manufactured by Maffei and the electrical equipment by WASSEG, a joint venture of AEG and SSW.

The manufacturers delivered the locomotives in 1924 and 1925 to the DRG, who took them into service, still as Class EP 5, with the numbers 21 501 - 535. In 1927 they were designated as E 52 01 - 35. The vehicles were exclusively based at Bavarian depots. By 1945, numbers E 52 02, 31 and 35 were retired. The DB took over the rest of the engines, but by 1950 numbers E 52 01, 29 and 32 had also retired. The remaining 29 machines were given the designation Class 152 in 1968. As new, powerful standard electric locomotives were available in large numbers as part of the DB's new construction programme, these heavy machines were soon redundant. In February 1973 the last engine of this class, number 152 014, was withdrawn from service. The Bavarian EP 5 was the heaviest electric locomotive ever to run in Germany, not the DRG Class E 95 as is often asserted.

== Preserved locomotives ==
Of the 35 Class E 52 locos built, only one has been preserved. E 52 34 may be found today in the livery of Bavarian EP 5 21 534, non-operational, in the Nuremberg Transport Museum.

== See also ==
- Royal Bavarian State Railways
- List of DB locomotives and railbuses
- List of DRG locomotives and railbuses
- List of Bavarian locomotives and railbuses
