= Weil der Stadt station =

Railway station in Weil der Stadt, Germany

Weil der Stadt
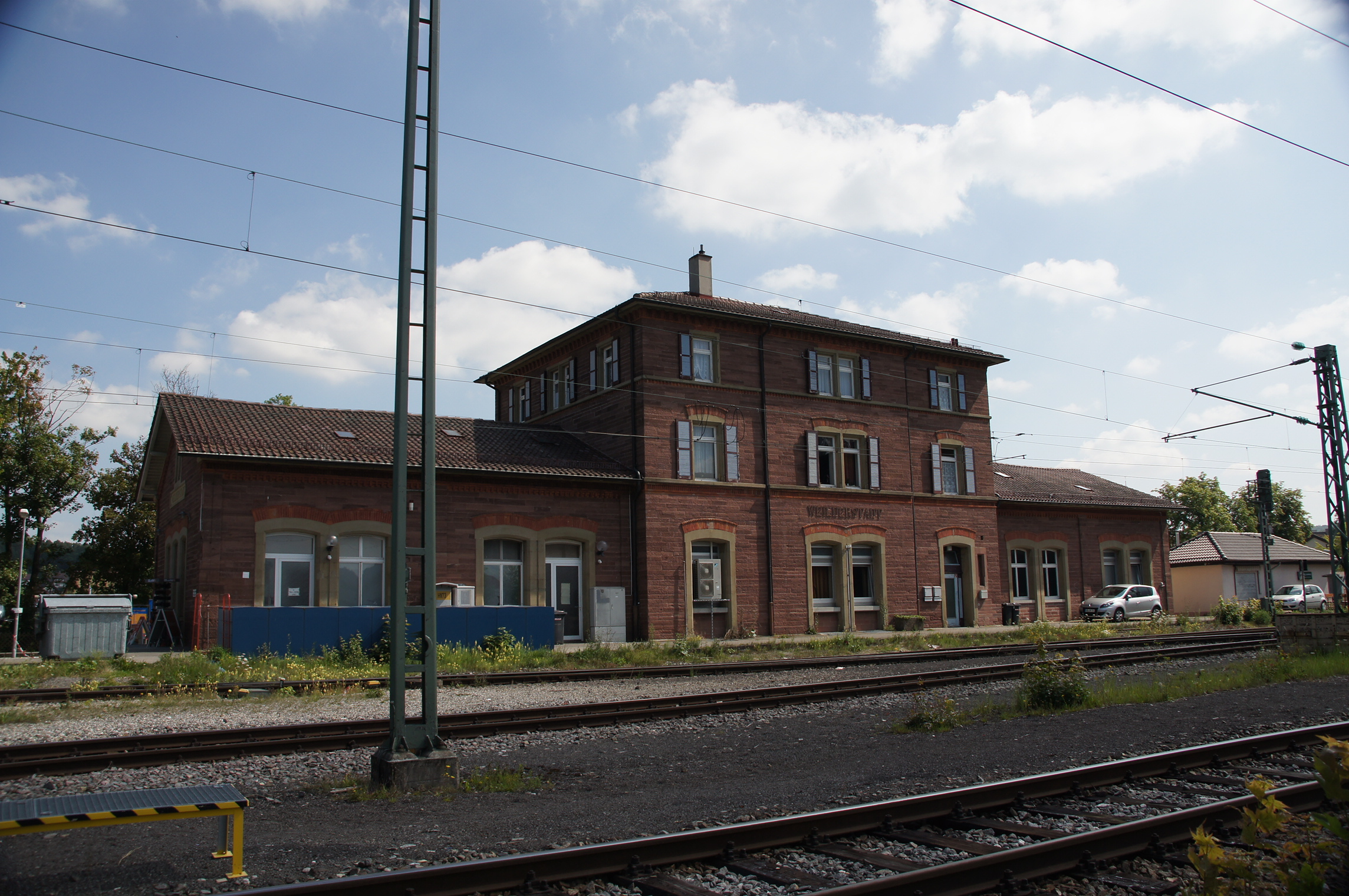
- Former station building

General information
- Location: Am Bahnhof 1, Weil der Stadt, Baden-Württemberg; Germany
- Coordinates: 48°45′20″N 8°52′23″E
- Owner: Deutsche Bahn
- Operator: DB Netz; DB Station&Service
- Lines: Black Forest Railway (Württemberg) (KBS 790.6
- Platforms: 3

Construction
- Accessible: Yes

Other information
- Station code: 6608
- DS100 code: TW
- IBNR: 8006271
- Category: 4
- Fare zone: : 4
- Website: www.bahnhof.de

History
- Opened: 1 December 1869; 156 years ago
- Electrified: 18 December 1939; 86 years ago

Services
Preceding station	Stuttgart S-Bahn	Following station
Malmsheim towards Schwabstraße	S6	Terminus
Location

Weil der Stadt station is a through station on the Black Forest Railway in the town of Weil der Stadt in the German state of Baden-Württemberg. The station is the terminus of lines S 6 and S 62 of the Stuttgart S-Bahn and a through station on regional line RB 76. It is classified by Deutsche Bahn as a category 4 station.

== History ==
In September 1862, the Royal Württemberg State Railways (German: Königlich Württembergischen Staats-Eisenbahnen) planned to build a railway from Illingen via Vaihingen an der Enz and Weil der Stadt to Calw. It did not pursue this project for long because the Kingdom of Württemberg had begun negotiations with the Grand Duchy of Baden in order to build the Nagold Valley Railway from Pforzheim. In February 1865, the Baden Government agreed to the construction of this line.

On 13 August 1865, the parliament of Württemberg decided to build the Black Forest Railway from Zuffenhausen via Leonberg to Calw. This line connected Weil der Stadt to the rail network. The State Railways built Weil der Stadt station north of the town. The monumental entrance building has survived but it is now used for other purposes.

=== State Railway era ===
The opening of the second part of the line from Ditzingen to Weil der Stadt took place on 1 December 1869. The difficult section through the Black Forest to Calw, was put into operation by the State Railways on 20 June 1872. The Black Forest Railway lost much of its importance after the completion of the Gäu Railway in September 1879. A planned branch from Weil der Stadt to Pforzheim was never built.

Despite the opening of the railway, Weil der Stadt continued to be dominated by agriculture. It was not until 1893 that a clothes manufacturer built a factory with four looms outside the town walls. The mill later produced Beyerle blankets. The increase in the population and industry was still limited. In 1910, only 1,859 people lived in the town, which was not much more than in previous decades. The inhabitants mostly grew hops and raised sheep.

=== Reichsbahn era ===
Deutsche Reichsbahn reduced services on the Black Forest line. In 1939, it operated only nine trains directly between Stuttgart and Calw on weekdays. Most trains from Stuttgart ended in Leonberg or Renningen. Nevertheless, the Reichsbahn electrified the Black Forest Railway on 18 December 1939 to Weil der Stadt. This gave the town, which still had a population of only 2,200, a connection to Stuttgart's suburban services. The locomotives used to haul through trains from Stuttgart to Calw and vice versa were changed in Weil der Stadt.

=== Deutsche Bundesbahn era ===
In the 1960s, the suburban electrical services were incorporated into the Stuttgart S-Bahn project. Weil der Stadt would be the terminus of a line. On 1 October 1978, Deutsche Bundesbahn launched operations S-Bahn line S 6. This finally ended continuous operations from Stuttgart to Calw. Deutsche Bundesbahn operated Uerdingen railbuses between Weil der Stadt and Calw until 29 May 1983, when passenger services were abandoned. Freight traffic to Althengstett ended after a landslide at Ostelsheim in March 1988.

For years, the Calw district and the Association of the Württemberg Black Forest Railway, Calw–Weil der Stadt (Verein Württembergische Schwarzwaldbahn Calw–Weil der Stadt) have tried to have the line reactivated, if necessary or appropriate, by extending line S 6 to Calw. On 1 February 2026 service resumed between Weil der Stadt and Calw as a shuttle Regionalbahn service operated by SWEG, using battery-electric multiple units (BEMU) as the line is not electrified.

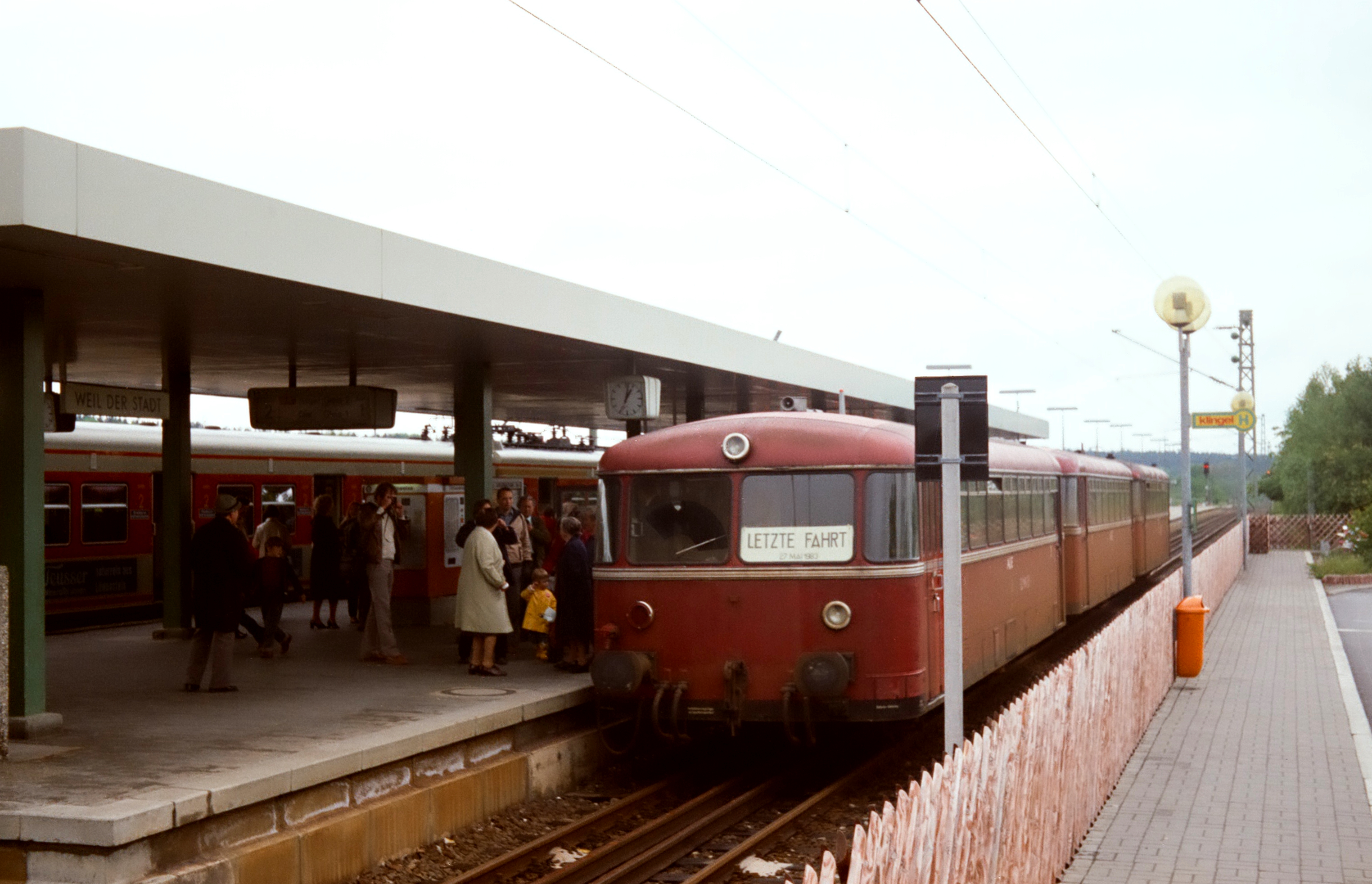
Last Calw train in Weil der Stadt station on closing day, 27 May 1983

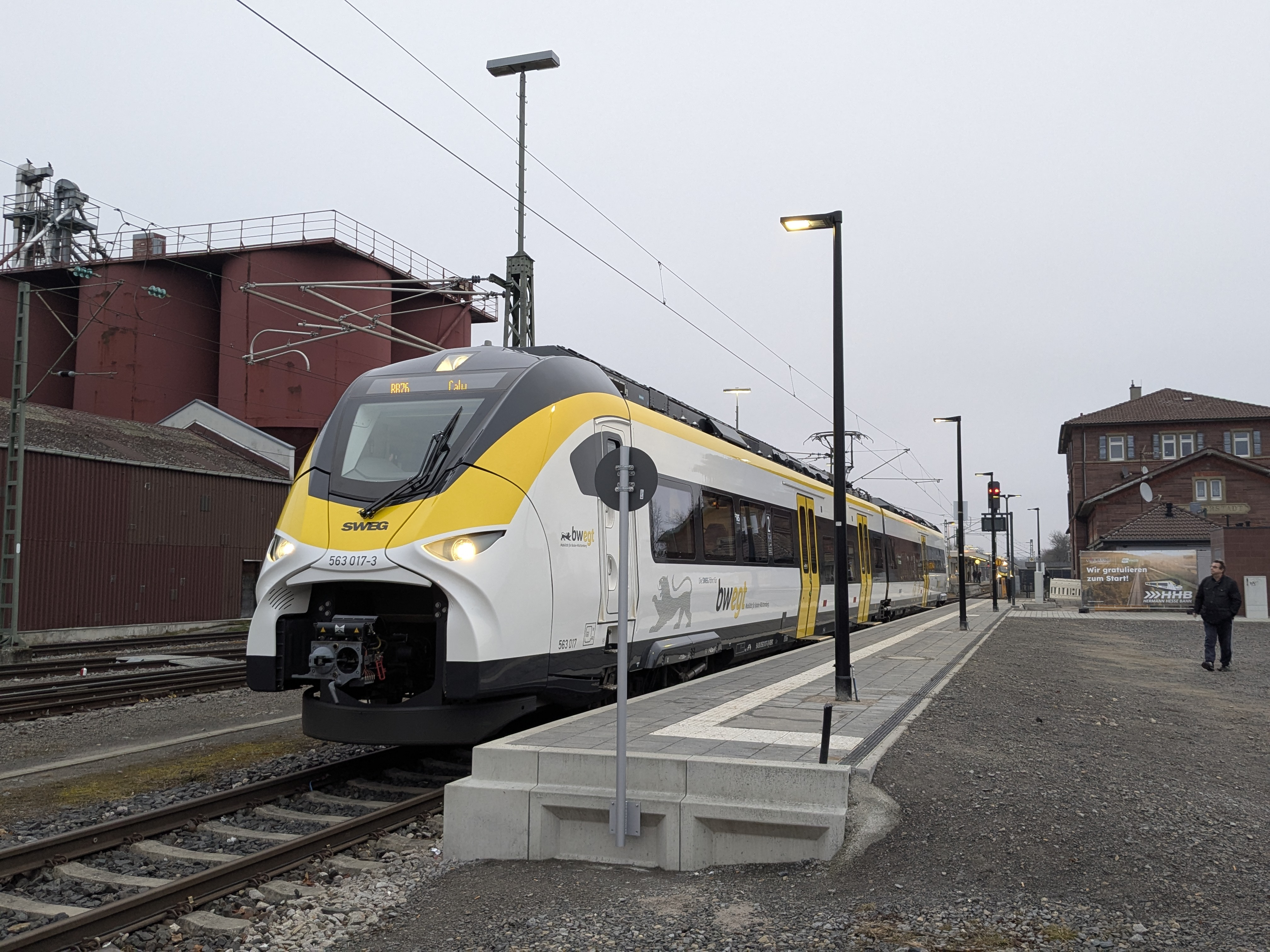
First Calw train on reopening day, 1 February 2026

=== Entrance building ===
The station building has a very wide three-storey central block with a shallow hipped roof that is almost atypical of the Royal Württemberg State Railways, which usually used rather slender designs for its stations. Left and right of the central building there are two-storey extensions. The facade of the building is built of red sandstone (Buntsandstein), which is also found in other buildings in Weil der Stadt (e.g. the church and the Rundbogenstil pillars of the town hall). The frames of the windows and doors are made of yellow sandstone and stand in contrast. The station's name is also carved in yellow sandstone on both extensions as WEILDERSTADT.

== Rail operations ==
The station is served by the S-Bahn Stuttgart, operated by DB Regio Baden-Württemberg and regional trains operated by SWEG. It has three platform tracks. Services of S-Bahn line S 6 start on track 2, whereas the peak-hour trains of line S 62 use track 1. Track 141 is used by RB 76 trains to and from Calw. It is classified by Deutsche Bahn as a category 4 station.

Line	Route	Timetable
S 6	Weil der Stadt – Renningen – Leonberg – Zuffenhausen – Feuerbach – Hauptbahnhof – Schwabstraße	every 15 minutes, every 30 minutes in the evening and on Sundays
S 62	Weil der Stadt – Leonberg – Zuffenhausen – Feuerbach (express peak hour trains)	every 30 minutes during the peak only
RB 76	(Renningen –) Weil der Stadt – Ostelsheim – Althengstett – Calw-Heumaden – Calw	every 30 minutes, to/from Renningen during the off-peak only
