= Ostelsheim =

- Municipality
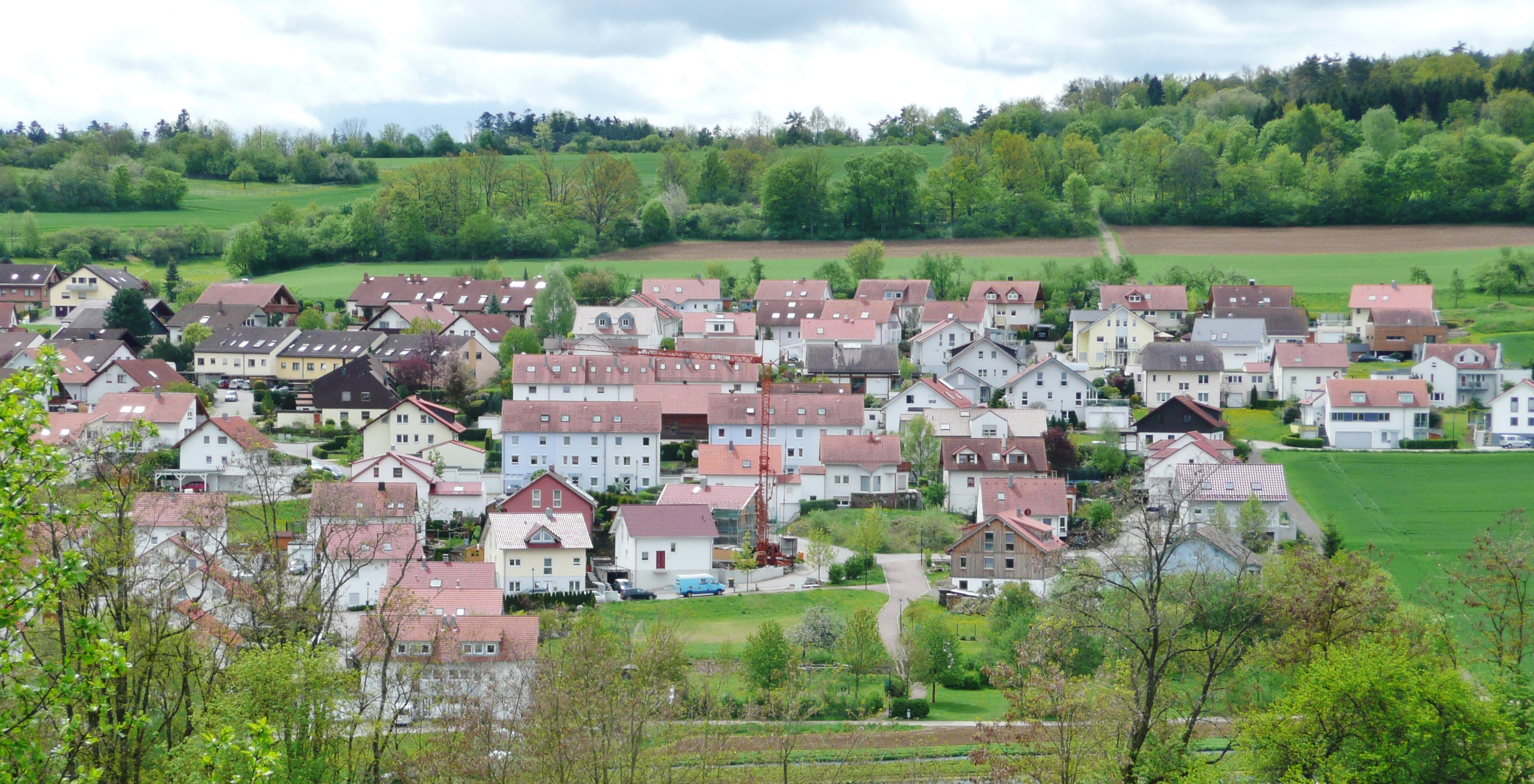
- Photo of Ostelsheim

- Coat of arms

- Location of Ostelsheim within Calw district
- Interactive map of Ostelsheim
- Location within Germany Location within Baden-Württemberg
- Coordinates: 48°43′37″N 08°50′52″E
- Country: Germany
- State: Baden-Württemberg
- Admin. region: Karlsruhe
- District: Calw

Government
  - Mayor (2023–31): Ryyan Alshebl

Area
  - Total: 9.23 km^{2} (3.56 sq mi)
- Elevation: 459 m (1,506 ft)

Population (2025-12-31)
  - Total: 2,510
  - Density: 272/km^{2} (704/sq mi)
- Time zone: UTC+01:00 (CET)
  - Summer (DST): UTC+02:00 (CEST)
- Postal codes: 75395
- Dialling codes: 07033
- Vehicle registration: CW
- Website: www.ostelsheim.de

Ostelsheim is a municipality in the district of Calw in Baden-Württemberg in Germany.

== Geography ==
Ostelsheim is located at the extreme limit of the Black Forest, and around a quarter of the 923-hectare mountain area consists of forest. The municipality is surrounded by hills and forests, protecting it from bad weather. Typical of the landscape are sheep pastures, stone bars, and numerous rear belts, which are preserved in their original appearance.

The municipality of Ostelsheim includes the villages of Ostelsheim and Sägemühle. Ostelsheim borders the municipalities Althengstett, Simmozheim, Weil der Stadt, Grafenau and Gechingen.

== History ==
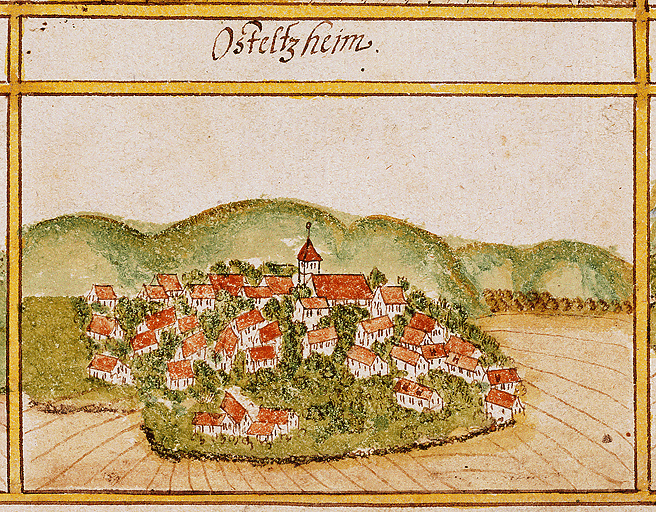
Ostelsheim in the year 1681

Ostelsheim is probably an Alemannic founding from the 4th century. In 1357 the municipality, along with Böblingen, joined the County of Württemberg. The County of Württemberg, which eventually became known as Württemberg-Hohenzollern, became part of the newly founded State of Baden-Württemberg in 1952. After regional reorganization in 1975 Ostelsheim retained its status as a municipality.

== Politics ==
In April 2023, Ryyan Alshebl, a Syrian refugee, was elected mayor.

Candidate	Party	Votes	%	+/-	Result
Ryyan Alshebl	Independent	753	55.41	New	Elected
Marco Strauß	Independent	591	43.49	New	Not elected
Mathias Fey	Independent	15	1.10	New	Not elected
Valid votes		1,359	99.85	▼0.5	
Invalid votes		2	0.15		
Electorate/voter turnout		1,361	68.39		
Source: Ostelsheim

== Economy and infrastructure ==
=== Transportation ===
No federal road runs through the municipality, though national road B 295 (Stuttgart - Calw) is three kilometers north of Ostelsheim in Weil der Stadt. The nearest motorway junction is Böblingen-Hulb on the A81, about twelve kilometers south-east. Ostelsheim is located on the Black Forest Railway which runs from Stuttgart via Weil der Stadt and then continues to Calw. However, passenger transport shut down in 1983 and with decommissioning of the section between Weil der Stadt and Calw for freight in 1988, the community became disconnected from the railway. The nearest railway station is now located about three kilometers away, in Weil der Stadt, and from there regular buses from Ostelsheim to Calw are available. The reactivation of the railway line is in planning.

=== Water supply ===
Since 1972, Ostelsheim has had a water supply contract with the Zweckverband, and the municipality has drawn its drinking water from the Zweckverband Schwarzwald water supply since 1976.

== Notable people ==
- Gottlieb Wilhelm Hoffmann (1771-1846), notary and mayor, founder of the Württemberg Brethren in Korntal and Wilhelmsdorf
