= Magstadt =

- Municipality
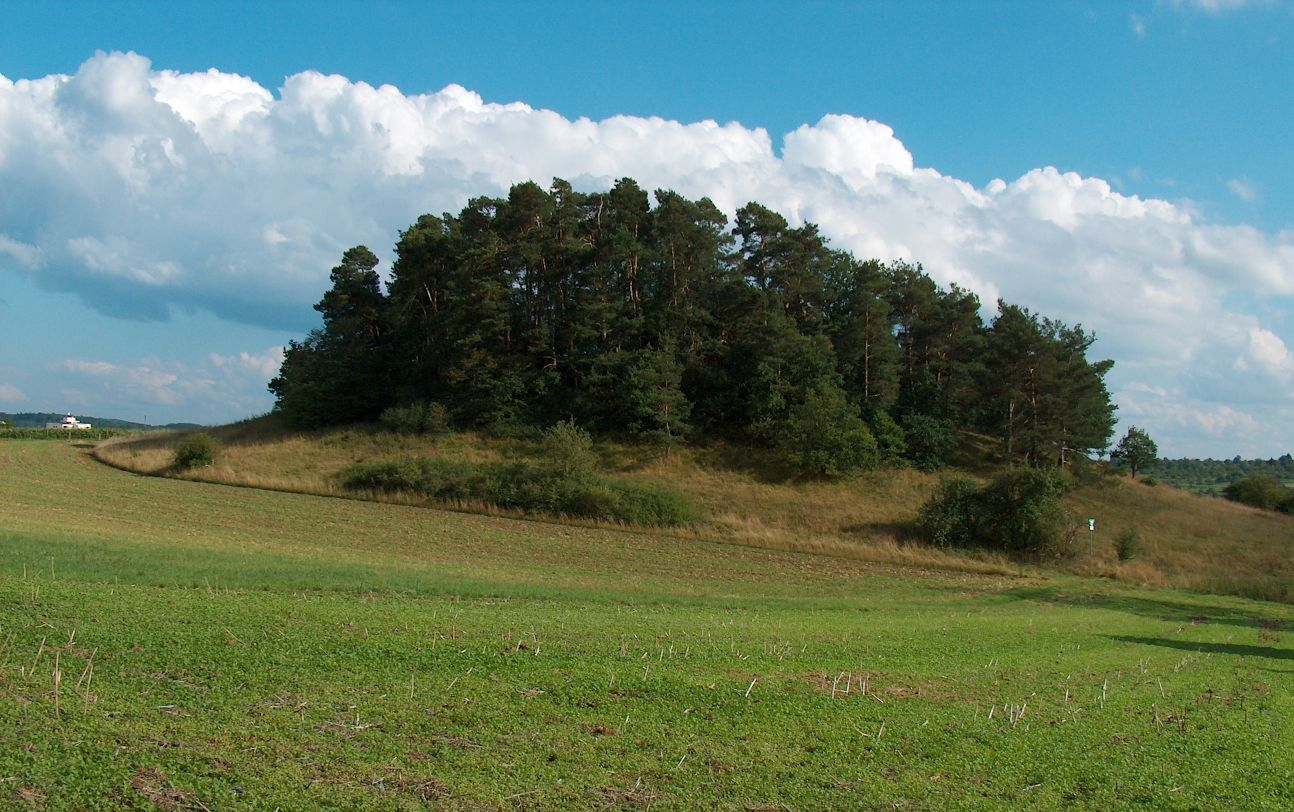
- Ratberg

- Coat of arms

- Location of Magstadt within Böblingen district
- Interactive map of Magstadt
- Location within Germany Location within Baden-Württemberg
- Coordinates: 48°44′32″N 8°57′54″E
- Country: Germany
- State: Baden-Württemberg
- Admin. region: Stuttgart
- District: Böblingen

Government
  - Mayor (2018–26): Florian Glock (FDP)

Area
  - Total: 19.13 km^{2} (7.39 sq mi)
- Elevation: 427 m (1,401 ft)

Population (2025-12-31)
  - Total: 9,427
  - Density: 492.8/km^{2} (1,276/sq mi)
- Time zone: UTC+01:00 (CET)
  - Summer (DST): UTC+02:00 (CEST)
- Postal codes: 71106
- Dialling codes: 07159
- Vehicle registration: BB
- Website: www.magstadt.de

Magstadt (German pronunciation: [ˈmaːkˌʃtat]) is a town in the German Federal state of Baden-Württemberg, in the district (Landkreis) Böblingen. It is located between Renningen and Sindelfingen.

== Demographics ==
Population development:

Year	Inhabitants
1990	8,233
2001	8,953
2011	8,908
2021	9,763
