= Hotzenwald Trail =

Hiking trail in Germany

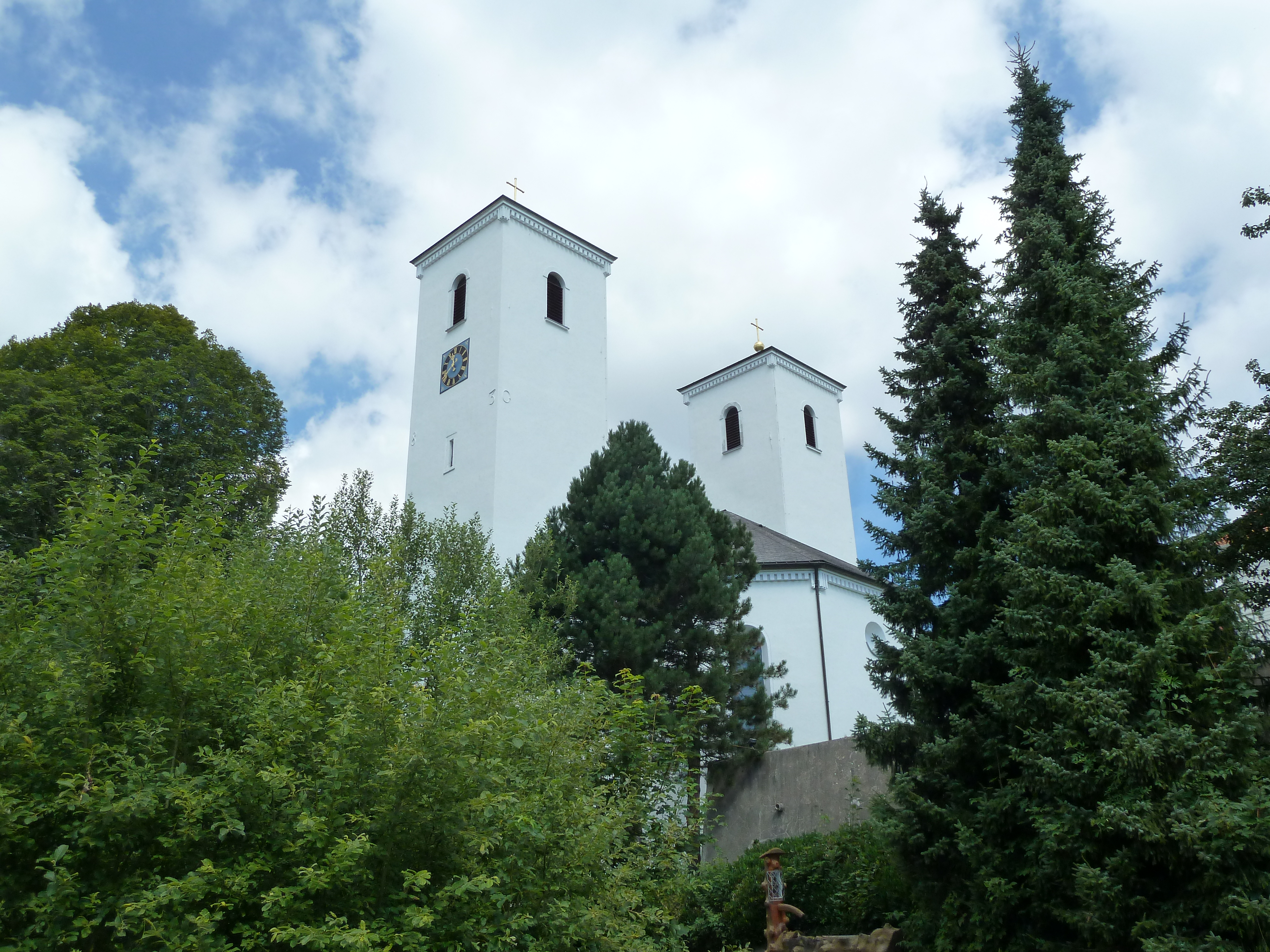
- Herrischried, at the halfway point
- Length: 46 km
- Location: Germany, Baden-Württemberg, Southern Black Forest
- Trailheads: Schopfheim; Waldshut
- Use: hiking trail
- Elevation change: 711 m
- Highest point: Ödlandkapelle (1,026 m)
- Lowest point: Waldshut (315 m)
- Difficulty: easy
- Season: spring to autumn
- Waymark: white and black diamond on a yellow background
- Sights: Gugel Tower
- Maintained by: Black Forest Club

The Hotzenwald Trail (German: Hotzenwald-Querweg) is a two-day, 46-kilometre-long hiking trail through the Southern Black Forest in Germany that runs from Schopfheim to Waldshut. The term Hotzenwald for the region through which the trail passes is derived from Joseph Victor von Scheffel's novel Der Trompeter von Säckingen ("The Trumpeter of Säckingen"). The hiking trail is sponsored and managed by the Black Forest Club. Its waymark is a white and black diamond on a yellow background.

== Short description ==
The Hotzenwald Trail runs from Schopfheim in the Wiese valley over the Dinkelberg and through the Wehra valley, past the Wehra Reservoir to Herrischried. On the second day the walk goes from there through the Murg and Alb valleys to Waldshut. On the mountains and hills between the valleys there are extensive views of the High Rhine, the Swiss Jura and the Alps to the south as well as the mountains of the High Black Forest to the north.

== Day tours/stages ==
=== First stage: Schopfheim – Herrischried ===
- Distance: 23 kilometres
- Journey time: c. 6 hours

Place/Attraction	Route (km)	Height (m above NHN)	Further information
Schopfheim railway station	0	373	
Eichen	1.5	390	Ortsteil von Schopfheim
Eichener See	2.0	490	The lake is a doline which only fills up in rainy years; otherwise it appears just as a grassy hollow.
Hasel	4.5	401	Crosses the Westweg
Wehra Reservoir	3.0	420	
Hornberg	7.0	968	Gasthaus
Ödlandkapelle	2,0	1.026	
Herrischried	3.0	874	

=== Second stage: Herrischried – Waldshut ===
- Distance: 23 kilometres
- Journey time: c. 6 hours

Place/Attraction	Route (km)	Height (m above NHN)	Further information
Herrischried	0	874	
Giersbach	1.5	860	
Gugelturm	1.0	997	Viewing tower BBQ hut
Engelschwand	0.5	912	In the municipality of Görwihl
Görwihl	7.5	671	Gasthaus
Alb Gorge	1.5	507	
Unteralpfen	4.0	608	In the municipality of Albbruck
Eschbach	4.0	463	In the municipality of Waldshut-Tiengen
Waldshut	3.,0	315	Crosses the Mittelweg
