= Waldshut (Landtag electoral district) =

State electoral district of Germany

59: Waldshut
- Electoral district for the Landtag of Baden-Württemberg
- Heilbronn in 2026
- District: Waldshut) and Lörrach
- Electorate: 123,115 (2026)
- Major settlements: Albbruck, Bad Säckingen, Dettighofen, Dogern, Eggingen, Görwihl, Herrischried, Hohentengen am Hochrhein, Jestetten, Klettgau, Küssaberg, Lauchringen, Laufenburg, Lottstetten, Murg, Rickenbach, Stühlingen, Waldshut-Tiengen, Wehr, Weilheim, Wutöschingen, Rheinfelden, and Schwörstadt

Current electoral district
- Party: CDU
- Member: Simon Herzog

Waldshut is an electoral constituency (German: Wahlkreis) represented in the Landtag of Baden-Württemberg. Since 2026, it has elected one member via first-past-the-post voting. Voters cast a second vote under which additional seats are allocated proportionally state-wide. Under the constituency numbering system, it is designated as constituency 59. It is split between the districts of Waldshut) and Lörrach.

== Geography ==
The constituency includes the –

- The municipalities of Albbruck, Bad Säckingen, Dettighofen, Dogern, Eggingen, Görwihl, Herrischried, Hohentengen am Hochrhein, Jestetten, Klettgau, Küssaberg, Lauchringen, Laufenburg, Lottstetten, Murg, Rickenbach, Stühlingen, Waldshut-Tiengen, Wehr, Weilheim, and Wutöschingen within the district of Waldshut).
- The municipalities of Rheinfelden and Schwörstadt, within the district of Lörrach.

There were 123,115 eligible voters in 2026.

== Members ==
=== First mandate ===
Both prior to and since the electoral reforms for the 2026 election, the winner of the plurality of the vote (first-past-the-post) in every constituency won the first mandate.

Election	Member	Party	%
1976	Rudolf Eberle	CDU	
1980	Rudolf Eberle	CDU	
1984	Rudolf Eberle	CDU	
Nov 1984	Peter Straub	CDU	
1988	Peter Straub	CDU	
1992	Peter Straub	CDU	
1996	Peter Straub	CDU	
2001	Peter Straub	CDU	46.6
2006	Peter Straub	CDU	44.3
2011	Felix Schreiner	CDU	39.2
2016	Felix Schreiner	CDU	30.8
Oct 2017	Sabine Hartmann-Müller	CDU	30.8
2021	Niklas Nüssle	Grüne	37.1
2026	Simon Herzog	CDU	33.3

=== Second mandate ===
Prior to the electoral reforms for the 2026 election, the seats in the state parliament were allocated proportionately amongst parties which received more than 5% of valid votes across the state. The seats that were won proportionally for parties that did not win as many first mandates as seats they were entitled to, were allocated to their candidates which received the highest proportion of the vote in their respective constituencies. This meant that following some elections, a constituency would have one or more members elected under a second mandate.

Prior to 2011, these second mandates were allocated to the party candidates who got the greatest number of votes, whilst from 2011-2021, these were allocated according to percentage share of the vote.

Election	Member	Party
1976	Kurt Bantle	SPD
1980	Kurt Bantle	SPD
1984	Kurt Bantle	SPD
1988	Dieter Puchta	SPD
1992		
1996	Dieter Puchta	SPD
2001	Dieter Puchta	SPD
Aug 2002	Alfred Winkler	SPD
2006	Alfred Winkler	SPD
2011	Alfred Winkler	SPD
Jan 2014	Hidir Gürakar	SPD
2016		
2021	Sabine Hartmann-Müller	CDU

== Election results ==
=== 2026 election ===
State election (2026): Waldshut
Notes:	Blue background denotes the winner of the electorate vote. Pink background denotes a candidate elected from their party list. Yellow background denotes an electorate win by a list member, or other incumbent. A ✓ or ✗ denotes status of any incumbent, win or lose respectively.						
Party	Candidate	Votes	%	±%	Party votes	%	±%
CDU	Simon Herzog	26,293	33.3	▲10.4	23,937	30.2	▲7.3
Greens	✗ Niklas Nüssle	19,070	24.1	▼13.0	22,261	28.1	▼9.0
AfD	Matthias Jehle	16,752	21.2	▲11.3	16,521	20.9	▲11.0
FW	Stefan Ruppaner	5,582	7.1	▲3.9	2,501	3.2	Steady
SPD	Joana Stöhrer da Costa	5,354	6.8	▼2.8	4,430	5.6	▼4.0
FDP	Nathalie Wagner	3,039	3.8	▼6.4	3,038	3.8	▼6.4
Left	Julian Besemann	2,967	3.8	▲1.1	2,615	3.3	▲0.7
BSW					1,067	1.3	
Volt					767	1.0	▲0.1
APT					754	1.0	
PARTEI					282	0.4	
dieBasis					235	0.3	▼1.0
Bündnis C					156	0.2	
Values					125	0.2	
ÖDP					118	0.1	▼0.6
Pensioners					113	0.1	
PdF					78	0.1	
Team Todenhöfer					77	0.1	
Verjüngungsforschung					52	0.1	
KlimalisteBW					45	0.1	▼0.8
Humanists					21	0.0	
Informal votes		659			523		
Total valid votes		79,057			79,193		
Turnout		79,716	64.7	▲8.1			
CDU gain from Greens	Majority	7,223	9.2				

== See also ==
- Politics of Baden-Württemberg
- Landtag of Baden-Württemberg
