= Mittelweg =

North–south long-distance path which runs through the Black Forest

- Trailheads

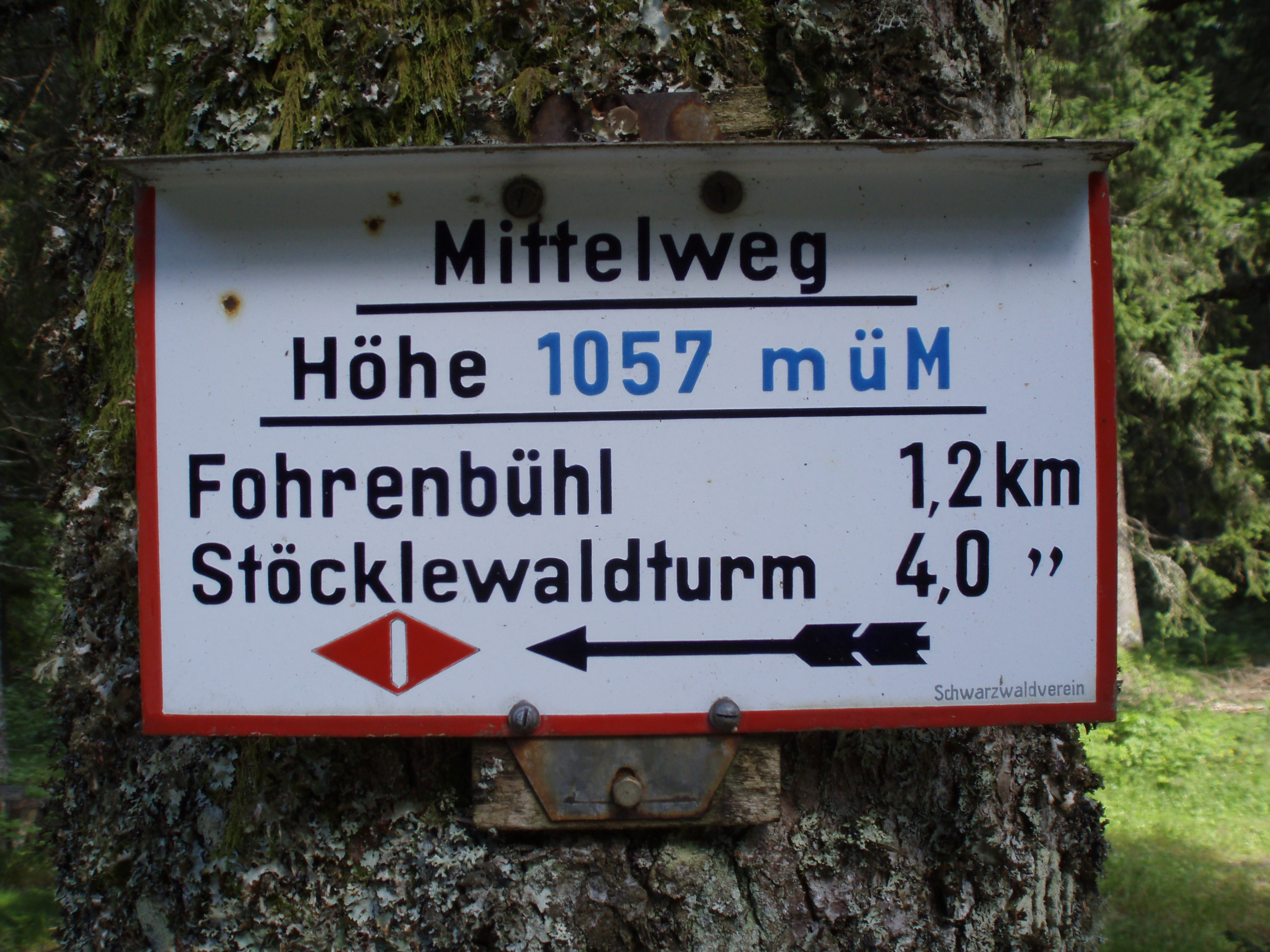
Historical signage on the Mittelweg near Furtwangen

The Mittelweg ("Middle Way") is a north–south long-distance path which runs through the Black Forest from Pforzheim to Waldshut. It is about 230 kilometres long and was established in 1903. Since then it has been maintained and sponsored by the Black Forest Club. Its waymark is a red diamond with a white bar on a white background.

== Description ==
From Pforzheim the path initially runs over the plateau between the Enz and Nagold valleys. Passing the raised bogs of the Northern Black Forest it goes to Freudenstadt and continues through the Central Black Forest via the Fohrenbühl and St. Georgen to the Hochfirst. In the Southern Black Forest the ‘’Mittelweg’’ passes through the valleys of the Schwarza and Schlücht (western branch) or Mettma (eastern branch) and reaches the High Rhine at Waldshut.

== Route ==
Overview of the stages of the Mittelweg
No.	Start of stage	End of stage	Route (km)	Walking time (h)
1.	Pforzheim	Bad Wildbad	23	5.5
2.	Bad Wildbad	Besenfeld	31	8
3.	Besenfeld	Oberzwieselberg	26	6.5
4.	Oberzwieselberg	Schiltach	25	6
5.	Schiltach	St. Georgen	30.5	7.5
6.	St. Georgen	Kalte Herberge	25.5	6.5
7.	Kalte Herberge	Lenzkirch	25.5	6.5
8.^{A}	Lenzkirch	Häusern	20	5
9.^{A}	Häusern	Waldshut	23	5.5
8.^{B}	Lenzkirch	Rothaus	13	3.5
9.^{B}	Rothaus	Waldshut	29	7

=== Common stages: Pforzheim – Lenzkirch ===
==== 1st Stage: Pforzheim – Bad Wildbad ====
- Distance: 23 km
- Journey time: c. 5.5 hours

No.	Place/Attraction	Route (km)	Height (m above NHN)	Further information
1.	Pforzheim-Kupferhammer	0	254	Start of the Mittelweg, Ostweg (to Schaffhausen) and Westweg (to Basel)
2.	Dillweißenstein	2.5	285	District of Pforzheim
3.	Büchenbronn	2.5	465	District of Pforzheim
4.	Hermannsee	1	460	
5.	Büchenbronner Height	1.5	609	Büchenbronn Viewing Tower
6.	Engelsbrand	1.5	547	
7.	Langenbrand	3.5	672	Village in the municipality of Schömberg
8.	Charlottenhöhe	4	684	Vocational promotion centre building
9.	Calmbach	2.5	399	Village in the municipality of Bad Wildbad
10.	Bad Wildbad	4	426	

==== 2nd Stage: Bad Wildbad – Besenfeld ====
- Distance: 31 km
- Journey time: c. 8 hours

No.	Place/Attraction	Route (km)	Height (m above NHN)	Further information
1.	Bad Wildbad	0	426	
2.	Fünf Bäume	4	784	
3.	Grünhütte	3.5	837	Ausflugslokal
4.	Weißensteinhütte	1.5	883	Branch to the Wildsee
5.	Kaltenbronn	4.6	869	Village in the municipality of Gernsbach, info centre
6.	Hohlohsee	1.2	980	Hochmoorsee
7.	Hohloh Tower	0.7	984	Viewing tower, refuge hut
8.	Prinzenhütte	1.3	954	Refuge hut
9.	Toter Mann	4.7	915	
10.	Schramberg	2.3	906	Log cabin Memorial to Murg Navigation Forest Inspector, Arnsperger; The forest in the area belonged in the 18th century to the Murg Navigation, which sent wood from the Black Forest to Holland.
11.	Neuhaus-Hütte	3.7	888	
12.	Besenfeld	3.5	782	Village in the municipality of Seewald

==== 3rd Stage: Besenfeld – Oberzwieselberg ====
- Distance: 26 km
- Journey time: c. 6.5 hours

No.	Place/Attraction	Route (km)	Height (m above NHN)	Further information
1.	Besenfeld	0	782	
2.	Ruine Königswart	3.5	790	Memorial site for Count Palatine Rudolf of Tübingen from the year 1209
3.	Igelsberger Hardt	4.5	790	
4.	Frutenhofer Wald	4.5	700	
5.	Buschige Fichte	4	780	
6.	Freudenstadt	4.5	740	
7.	Oberzwieselberg	5	841	District of Freudenstadt

==== 4th Stage: Oberzwieselberg – Schiltach ====
- Distance: 25 km
- Journey time: c. 6 hours

No.	Place/Attraction	Route (km)	Height (m above NHN)	Further information
1.	Oberzwieselberg	0	841	
2.	Schmiedsberger Platz	8	773	Crosses the Little Hansjakob Way; refuge hut
3.	Tor	3	705	Crosses the Gengenbach–Alpirsbach Trail
4.	Bocksecke	1	810	
5.	Emil Hut (Emilshütte)	1.5	800	
6.	Salzlecke	1	760	Refuge hut
7.	Teisenkopf	5	764	Viewing tower
8.	Kuhberg-Mattenweiher	1.5	638	
9.	Schiltach	4	325	

==== 5th Stage: Schiltach – St. Georgen ====
- Distance: 30.5 km
- Journey time: c. 7.5 hours

No.	Place/Attraction	Route (km)	Height (m above NHN)	Further information
1.	Schiltach	0	325	
2.	Dornacker	3.5	660	
3.	Bauernhof Grusenloch	2.5	770	
4.	Mooswaldkopf	4	879	SV Wanderheim Fohrenbühl observation tower (planned by Paul Bonatz)
5.	Fohrenbühl	1	787	Village in the municipality of Lauterbach and Hornberg (the boundary runs through the settlement.)
6.	Falkenhöhe	4	858	
7.	Benzebene	3.5	896	
8.	Windkapf	1.5	928	
9.	Lindenbüble	3	885	SV-Wanderheim
10.	Gasthof Staude	2	889	Crosses the Rottweil–Lahr Trail
11.	Hochwälder Height	3	966	
12.	St. Georgen	3	862	

==== 6th Stage: St. Georgen – Kalte Herberge ====
- Distance: 25.5 km
- Journey time: c. 6.5 hours

No.	Place/Attraction	Route (km)	Height (m above NHN)	Further information
1.	St. Georgen	0	862	
2.	Kreuzweg	4	951	
3.	Kesselberg Fuchsfalle	4	1.010	
4.	Triberg Gallows (Triberger Galgen)	1	1.020	
5.	Stöcklewald Tower	1	1.069	SV Wanderheim observation tower
6.	Fürsatz	3	1.036	
7.	Furtwangen	5	872	Crosses the Black Forest–Kaiserstuhl–Rhine Trail
8.	Hohles Bildstöckle	5	1.060	
9.	Kalte Herberge	2	1.029	Gasthof

==== 7th Stage: Kalte Herberge – Lenzkirch ====
- Distance: 25.5 km
- Journey time: c. 6.5 hours

No.	Place/Attraction	Route (km)	Height (m above NHN)	Further information
1.	Kalte Herberge	0	1.029	
2.	Hochberg	3	1.130	Gasthof Engel
3.	Margrutt	2	1.049	
4.	Ferdinandshöhe	4.5	1.031	
5.	Am Wiedenkreuz	3	1.010	
6.	Neustadt	3.5	828	
7.	Saiger Kreuz	3	1.028	
8.	Hochfirst	1	1.190	Crosses the Freiburg–Lake Constance Trail; SV Wanderheim observation tower
9.	Hierabrunnen	2.5	1.114	Refuge hut
10.	Lenzkirch	3	808	Crosses the Schluchtensteig

=== Western branch: Lenzkirch – Waldshut ===
==== 8th Stage: Lenzkirch – Häusern ====
- Distance: 20 km
- Journey time: c. 5 hours

No.	Place/Attraction	Route (km)	Height (m above NHN)	Further information
1.	Lenzkirch	0	808	
2.	Brisgowenkapelle	4.5	1.075	
3.	Schluchsee	3.5	951	
4.	Seebrugg railway station	3	932	
5.	Schluchsee Dam	1	931	
6.	Eisenbreche	1.5	914	
7.	Blasiwald-Althütte	2.5	1.088	Village in the municipality of Schluchsee; Crosses the Schluchtensteig
8.	Häusern	4	891	

==== 9th Stage: Häusern – Waldshut ====
- Distance: 23 km
- Journey time: c. 5.5 hours

No.	Place/Attraction	Route (km)	Height (m above NHN)	Further information
1.	Häusern	0	891	
2.	Höchenschwand	3	1.010	
3.	Kreuzstein	1	968	Forest car park
4.	Fohrenbachmühle	7	600	
5.	Nöggenschwiel	1.5	719	Village in the municipality of Weilheim
6.	Heubach	2	737	
7.	Indlekofen	3.5	540	District of Waldshut-Tiengen
8.	Waldshut	5	343	

=== Eastern branch: Lenzkirch – Waldshut ===
==== 8th Stage: Lenzkirch – Rothaus ====
- Distance: 13 km
- Journey time: c. 3.5 hours

No.	Place/Attraction	Route (km)	Height (m above NHN)	Further information
1.	Lenzkirch	0	808	
2.	Kinderheim Dresselbach	7	1.064	
3.	Dürrenbühl	4	1.028	St. Cyriakus pilgrimage church
4.	Rothaus	2	971	Village in the municipality of Grafenhausen

==== 9th Stage: Rothaus – Waldshut ====
- Distance: 30 km
- Journey time: c. 7 hours

No.	Place/Attraction	Route (km)	Height (m above NHN)	Further information
1.	Rothaus	0	971	
2.	Schaffhauser Säge	3	800	
3.	Klausenmühle	3	1.090	
4.	Buggenrieder Mühle	3	730	
5.	Lochmühle	4.5	608	
6.	Mettmamündung	2.5	520	Mouth of the Mettma on the Mettma Reservoir
7.	Witznau	4	436	
8.	Gutenburg	4.5	390	District of Waldshut-Tiengen
9.	Gurtweil	2.5	373	District of Waldshut-Tiengen
10.	Waldshut	3	342	
