= Gustav Siewerth Academy =

Coordinates: 47.6784°N 8.19821°E

- Type: Private
- Established: 1988
- Religious affiliation: Catholicism; Forum of German Catholics
- Students: 13
- Location: Weilheim, Baden-Wuerttemberg, Germany
- Language: German

The Gustav Siewerth Academy (GSA) is a private university based in Weilheim-Bierbronnen in Baden-Wuerttemberg, Germany, dedicated to promote a Christian world view. The university became recognized as an institution of higher education in Germany in 1988. However, that recognition is disputed. The Academy is named after philosopher and pedagogue Gustav Siewerth and with only 13 students in 2012–13, was the smallest state-recognized institution of higher education in Germany. Its recognition as a university was rescinded in 2013.

The Academy was created to counteract the neo-Marxism views of the Frankfurt School of Theodor W. Adorno and Max Horkheimer. The Academy was founded as a "breeding ground of the truth" by Alma von Stockhausen, previously Professor of Philosophy at the University of Education Freiburg. She is vice rector of the Academy. Remigius Bäumer, the founding principal of the academy, served as the church historian.

== History ==
The Academy was founded in 1988 under private ownership. Legal and financial support is provided by a non-profit limited liability company (Gustav-Siewerth House gGmbH). The religious focus of the Academy is predominantly Catholic. Although the Academy is non-denominational, it is a member of the Forum of German Catholics.

The college has a rector, vice-rectors, deans of a University senate and a registrar. The honorary rector is Count Albrecht von Brandenstein-Zeppelin. Chancellor of the Academy is the Archbishop of Freiburg and head of the German Bishops' Conference, Robert Zollitsch.

Courses are offered in Philosophy, Sociology and Family Studies with majors in Catholic theology and pedagogy. Minor subjects are offered in the philosophy of science and journalism (Giessen model). The Master of Arts (MA) can be awarded. The University is not accredited to award doctorates. The University has established other institutions such as the Department of Family Science, the Institute for Luther research, the Institute of Hagiography, the Institute for Scientific border issues and the Institute for Ostwissenschaft.
