= Albbruck station =

Railway station in Albbruck, Germany

Albbruck
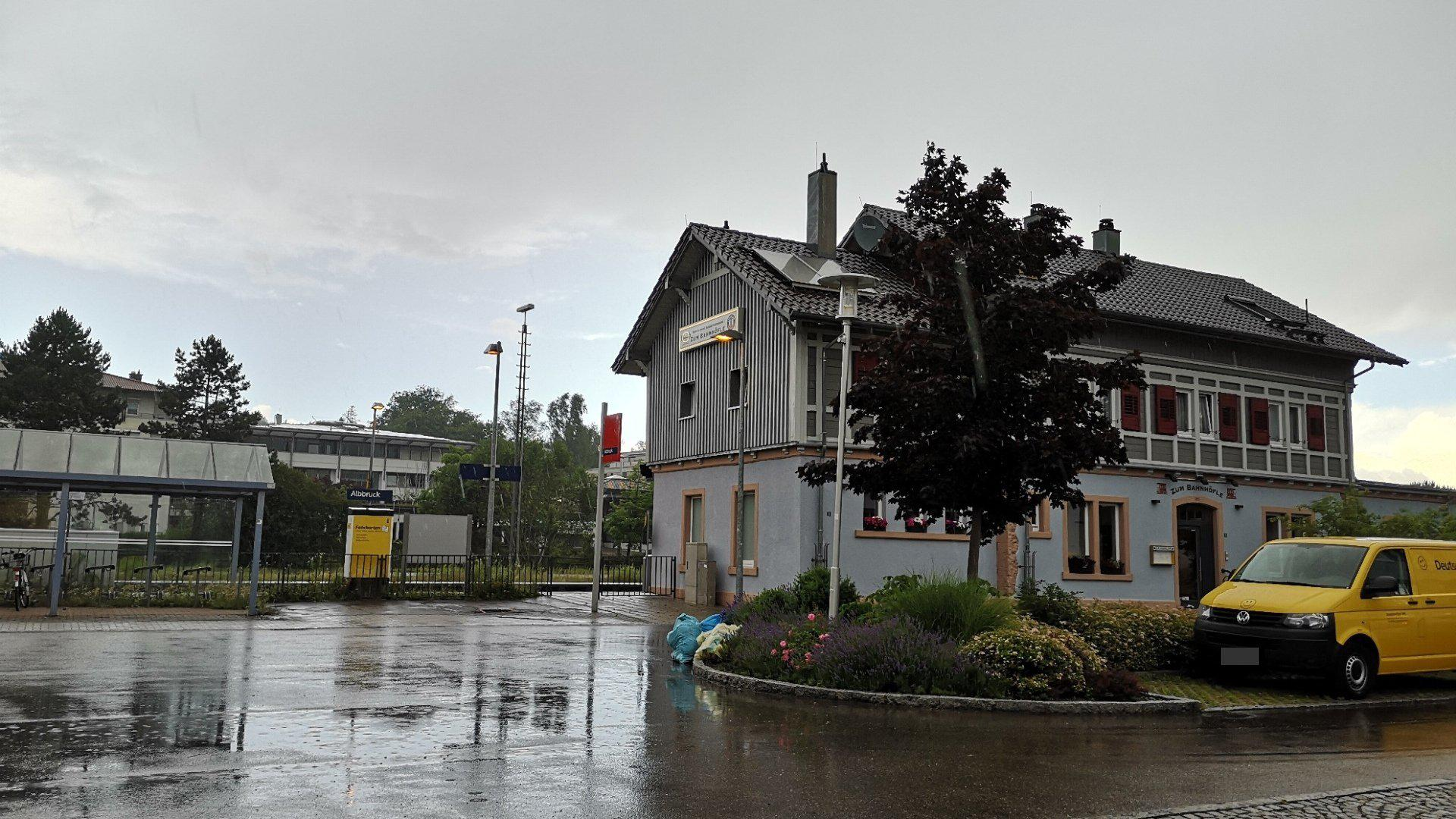
- The station building in 2019

General information
- Location: Albbruck, Baden-Württemberg; Germany
- Coordinates: 47°35′32″N 8°07′54″E
- Owner: Deutsche Bahn
- Lines: High Rhine Railway (KBS 730)
- Distance: 317.9 km (197.5 mi) from Mannheim Hbf
- Platforms: 1 island platform; 1 side platform
- Tracks: 3
- Train operators: DB Regio Baden-Württemberg
- Connections: Südbadenbus bus lines

Other information
- Fare zone: 2 (WTV)

Services
| Preceding station | Basel S-Bahn | Following station |
|---|---|---|
| Laufenburg (Baden) Ost towards Basel Bad Bf | RB30 | Dogern towards Lauchringen |
Location

Albbruck station (German: Bahnhof Albbruck) is a railway station in the town of Albbruck, Baden-Württemberg, Germany. The station lies on the High Rhine Railway. The train services are operated by Deutsche Bahn.

== Services ==
As of the December 2023 timetable change, the following services stop at Albbruck:

- Basel S-Bahn: RB30 hourly service between Basel Bad Bf and Lauchringen, supplemented by hourly weekday service in the afternoons between Basel and Waldshut.
