= Görwihl =

- Municipality
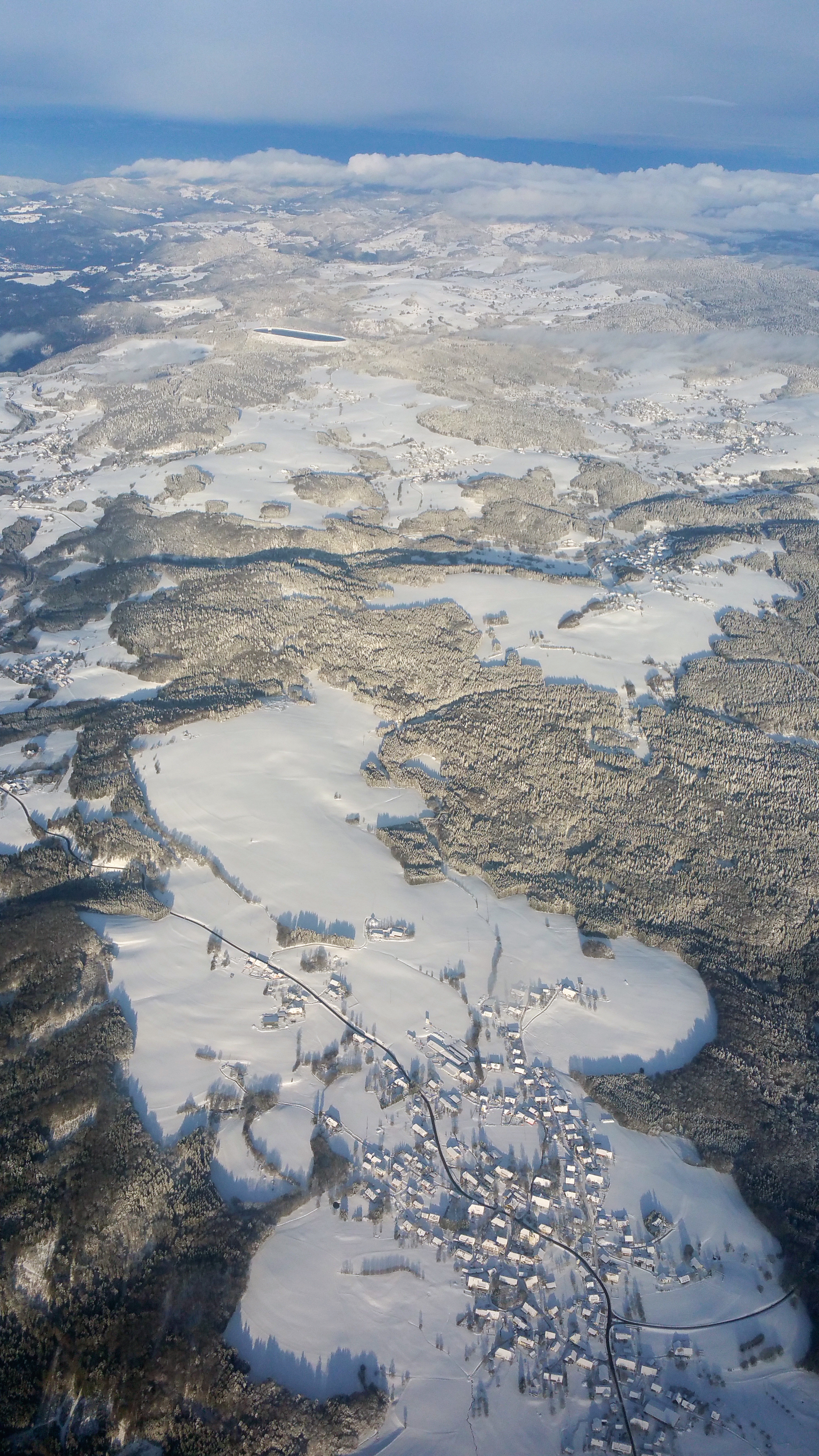

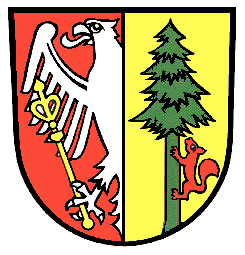
- Coat of arms

- Location of Görwihl within Waldshut district
- Interactive map of Görwihl
- Location within Germany Location within Baden-Württemberg
- Coordinates: 47°38′28″N 08°04′42″E
- Country: Germany
- State: Baden-Württemberg
- Admin. region: Freiburg
- District: Waldshut

Government
  - Mayor (2023–31): Mike Biehler

Area
  - Total: 50.42 km^{2} (19.47 sq mi)
- Elevation: 612 m (2,008 ft)

Population (2025-12-31)
  - Total: 4,174
  - Density: 82.78/km^{2} (214.4/sq mi)
- Time zone: UTC+01:00 (CET)
  - Summer (DST): UTC+02:00 (CEST)
- Postal codes: 79733
- Dialling codes: 07754
- Vehicle registration: WT
- Website: www.goerwihl.de

Görwihl is a municipality in the district of Waldshut in Baden-Württemberg in Germany.

== History ==
The name is derived from the ancient German for spear, due to the spearhead shape of the area at the time.

Görwihl was established in 1193, and was first recorded as Gerswillare. Like many places in the region, Görwihl belonged to the county Hauenstein within Further Austria. It became the centre of legal activity for the region and played a role in the peasants' uprising. In 1806, Görwihl became part of the newly created Grand Duchy of Baden.

The community in its present scale was developed in the context of Baden-Wurttemberg regional reform. Rotzingen joined the municipality of Görwihl in 1971 and Hartschwand in 1972, with the other districts following in 1975.

== Geography ==
Görwihl is within the Hotzenwald region, and lies in the southernmost part of the Black Forest, at the edge of the River Alb, a tributary of the Rhine. The landscape of the region is characterized by high plateaus of various sizes, the stepped terraces descending toward the south. About 60% of the area within the town boundary consists of forest.

The community is bordered to the north by Ibach, on the east by Albbruck, in the south by the city of Laufenburg and on the west by Rickenbach and Herrischried.
