= Hornberg Basin =

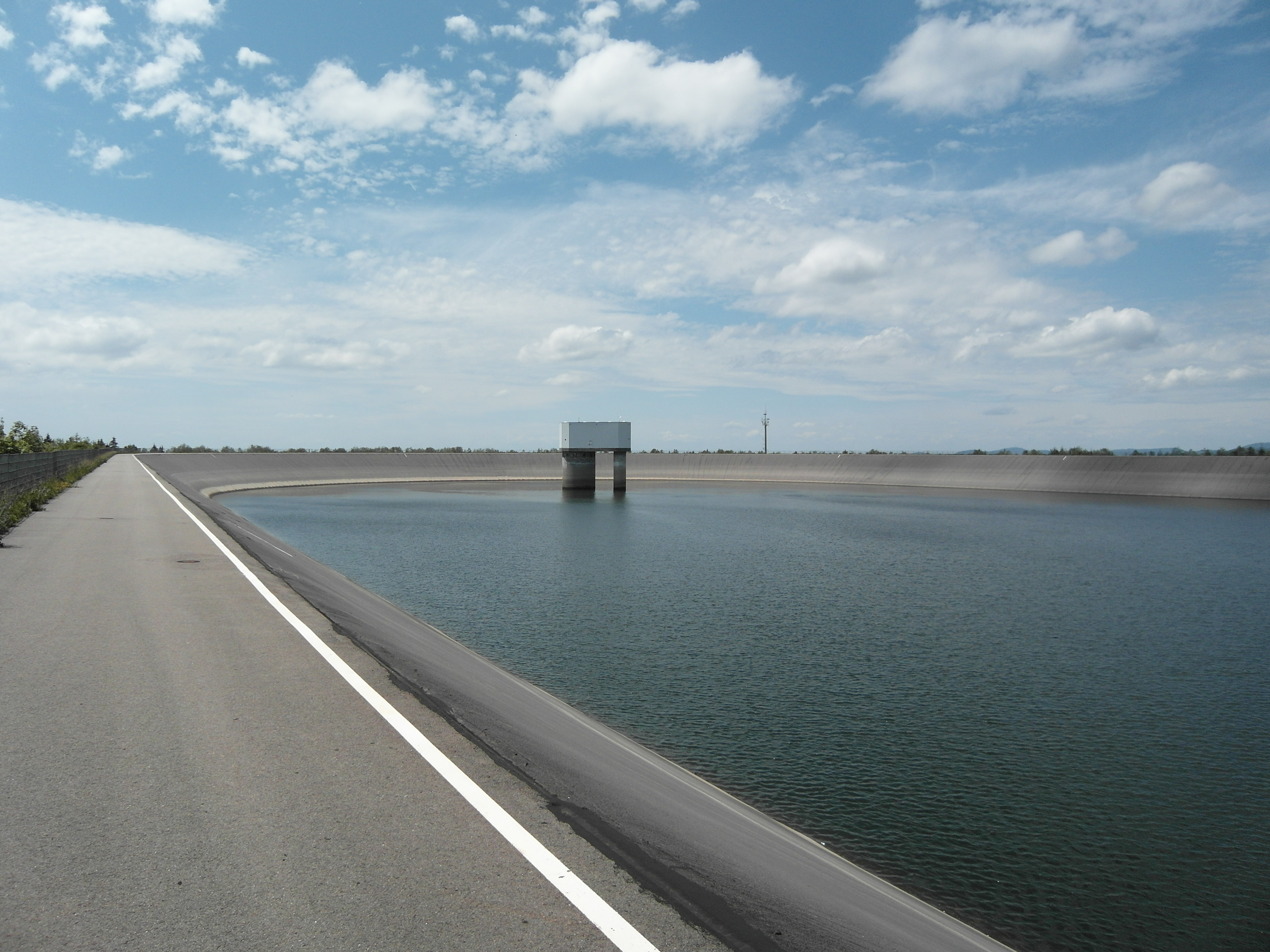
- Hornberg Basin - Upper storage reservoir of the Wehr pumped hydropower station
- Interactive map of Hornberg Basin
- Location: Landkreis Waldshut
- Construction began: 1970–1975

Dam and spillways
- Height (foundation): 65 m
- Height (thalweg): 65 m
- Length: 1,715 m (5,627 ft)
- Elevation at crest: 1050.00 m
- Width (crest): 5 m
- Dam volume: 2200000 m^{3}

Reservoir
- Active capacity: 4.4 million m³
- Surface area: 0.17 km^{2}
- Maximum length: 0.700 km
- Maximum width: 0.300 km
- Normal elevation: 1048.00 m

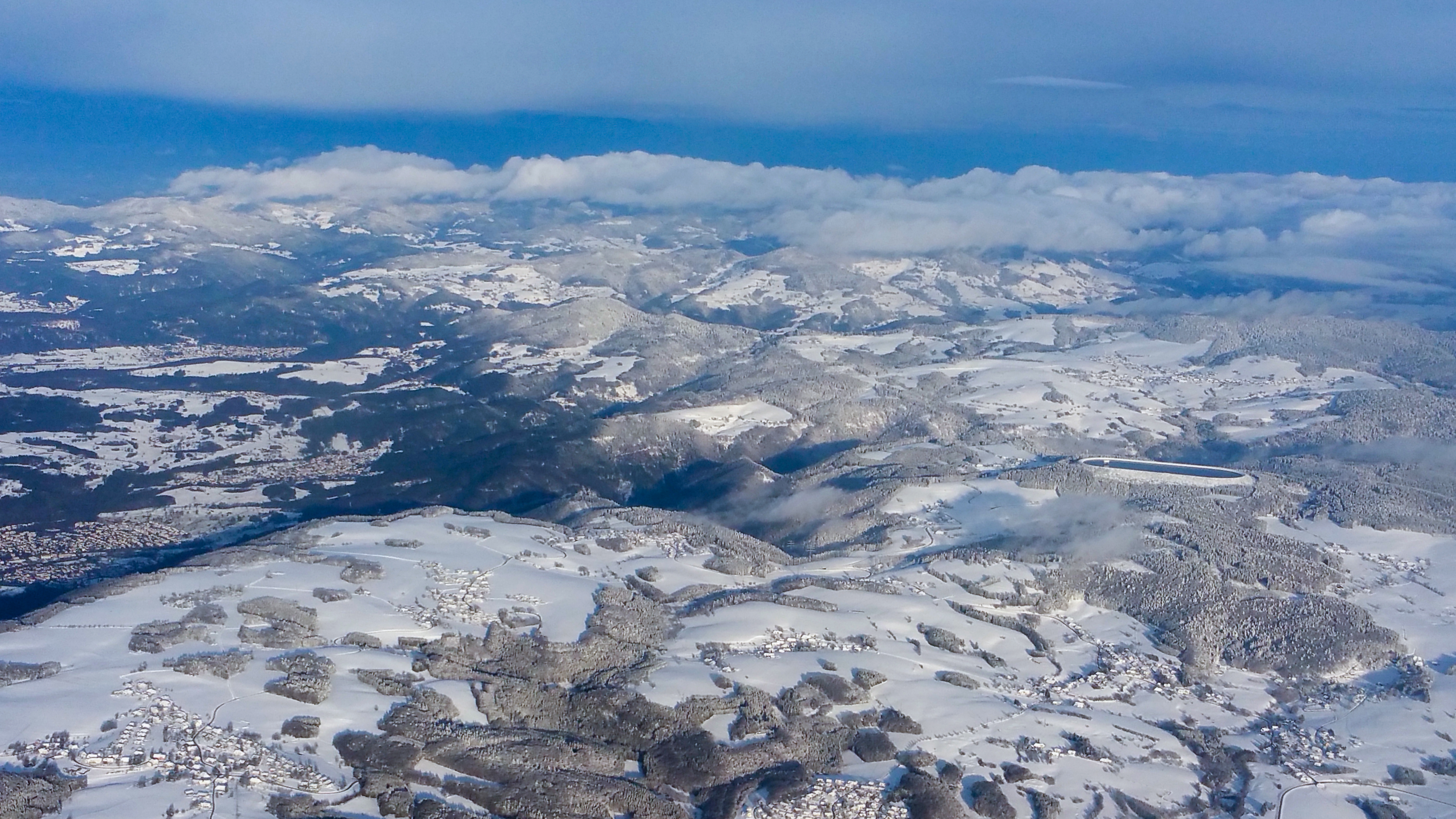
The Hornberg Basin from the air (31 Jan 2015).

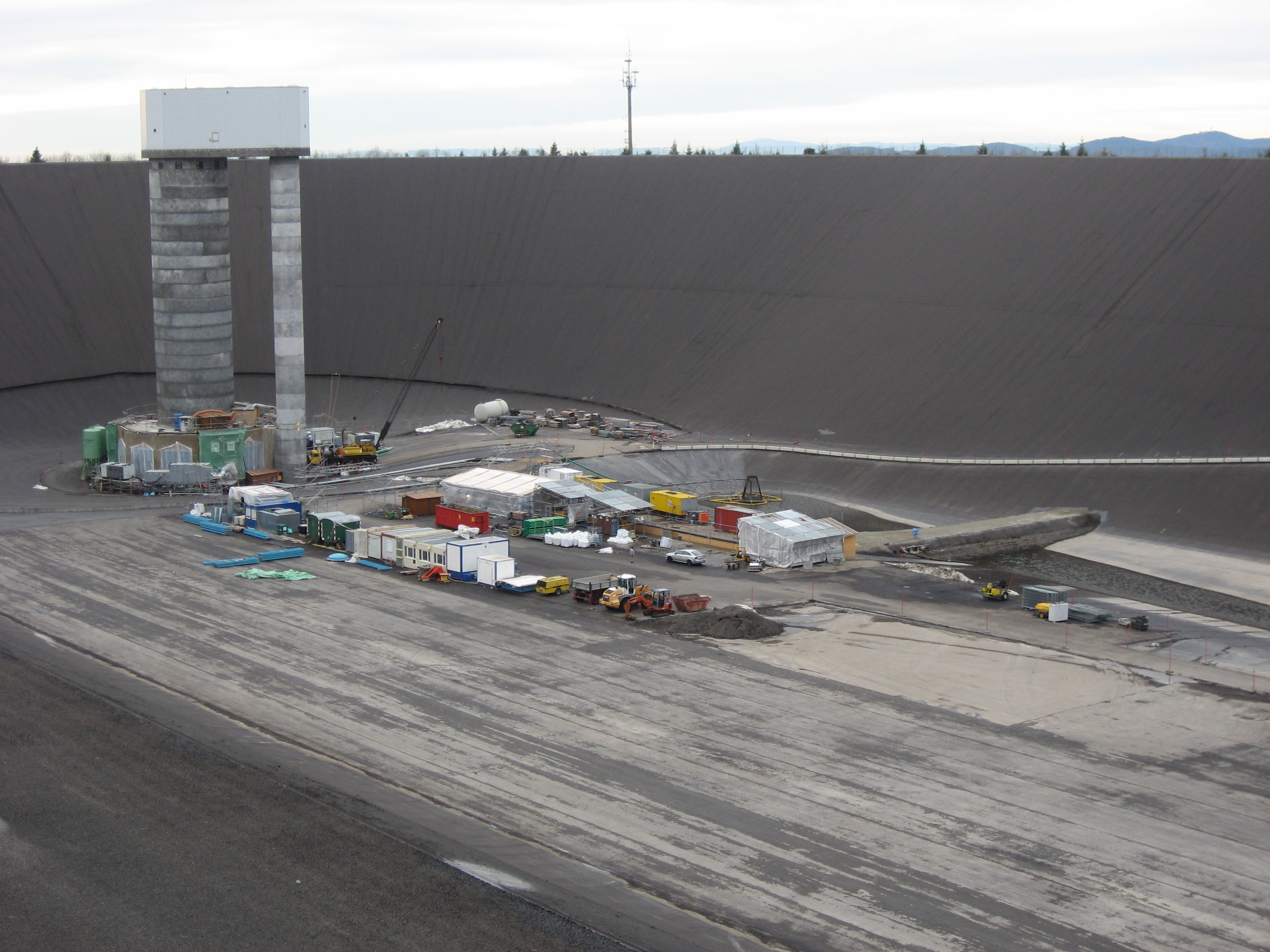
The Hornberg Basin during renovations in November 2008

The Hornberg Basin (German: Hornbergbecken) is the upper reservoir of the Wehr power station, whose lower reservoir is impounded by the Wehra Dam. It lies near Herrischried (Hornberg) and near the town of Wehr in the county of Waldshut in Baden-Württemberg on the dome of the Langer Eck, the highest hill in the Hotzenwald. It was opened in 1975, is only used to generate pumped-storage power and is operated by the Schluchseewerk.

An addition to the existing Hornberg Basin was planned as part of building the Atdorf Power Station, but the effort was cancelled in 2017 by the local operating company EnBW. With a length of almost one kilometre and storage capacity of 9 million m^{3} it would have been considerably larger than the present Hornberg Basin.

== See also ==
- List of dams in Germany

== Literature ==
- Festschrift Hornbergstufe der Schluchseewerk AG. November 1976
- Peter Franke, Wolfgang Frey: Talsperren in der Bundesrepublik Deutschland. DNK – DVWK 1987, ISBN 3-926520-00-0.
