= Kaiserstuhl–Rhine Black Forest Trail =

Hiking trail in Germany

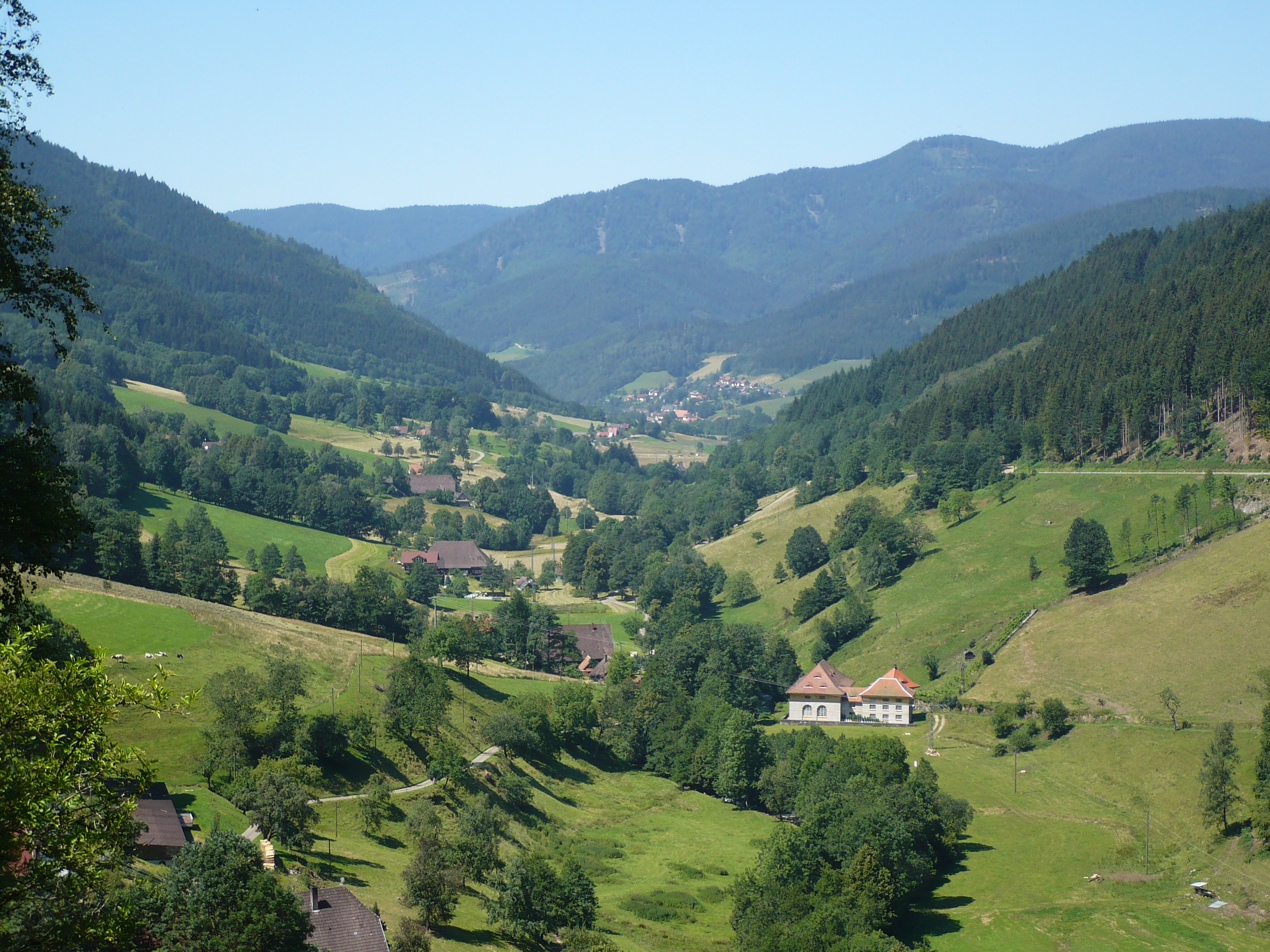
- Simonswälder Tal
- Length: 109 km
- Location: Germany, Baden-Württemberg, Black Forest, Kaiserstuhl
- Trailheads: Donaueschingen; Breisach
- Use: Fernwanderweg
- Highest point: Southern Staatsberg/Winkel (1,045 m (3,428 ft 5 1/2 in) DE)
- Lowest point: Breisach (189 m (620 ft 1 in) DE)
- Difficulty: easy
- Season: spring to autumn
- Waymark: red diamond on a yellow background
- Maintained by: Black Forest Club

The Kaiserstuhl–Rhine Black Forest Trail (German: Schwarzwald-Querweg Schwarzwald–Kaiserstuhl–Rhein) is an east–west hiking trail of several days' duration through the Black Forest in Germany from Donaueschingen to Breisach. The 109-kilometre-long hiking trail is managed and maintained by the Black Forest Club.

== Short description ==
The Black Forest–Kaiserstuhl–Rhine Trail begins in Donaueschingen. It then runs through the valley of the River Breg up to the watershed between the Danube and the Rhine. Leading through the valleys of Simonswälder Tal and the River Elz, the route reaches the Rhine Plain and the Kaiserstuhl. It ends in Breisach on the Rhine. The entire route is signed and waymarked, with the intention that no maps or route instructions are needed.

== Day tours/stages ==
=== First Stage: Donaueschingen – Vöhrenbach ===
==== Overview ====
- Distance: 25,5 km
- Duration: c. 6.5 hours

Place/Attraction	Route (km)	Height (m above NHN)	Further information
Donaueschingen	0	675	
Aufen	3.5	690	Quarter of Donaueschingen
Neue Fron	2,0	765	
Eichbuck Hut	0,5	763	Barbecue area
Wolterdingen	1,5	717	
Tannheim	5.5	750	Village in the borough of Villingen-Schwenningen
Spitalhöfe	3.5	820	
Herzogenweiler	1.5	870	Village in the borough of Villingen-Schwenningen
Schuhbartle	2.0	930	forest car park
Schlossermatte	1.0	898	
Saint Michael's Chapel	3.5	862	
Vöhrenbach	1.5	797	

==== Route description ====
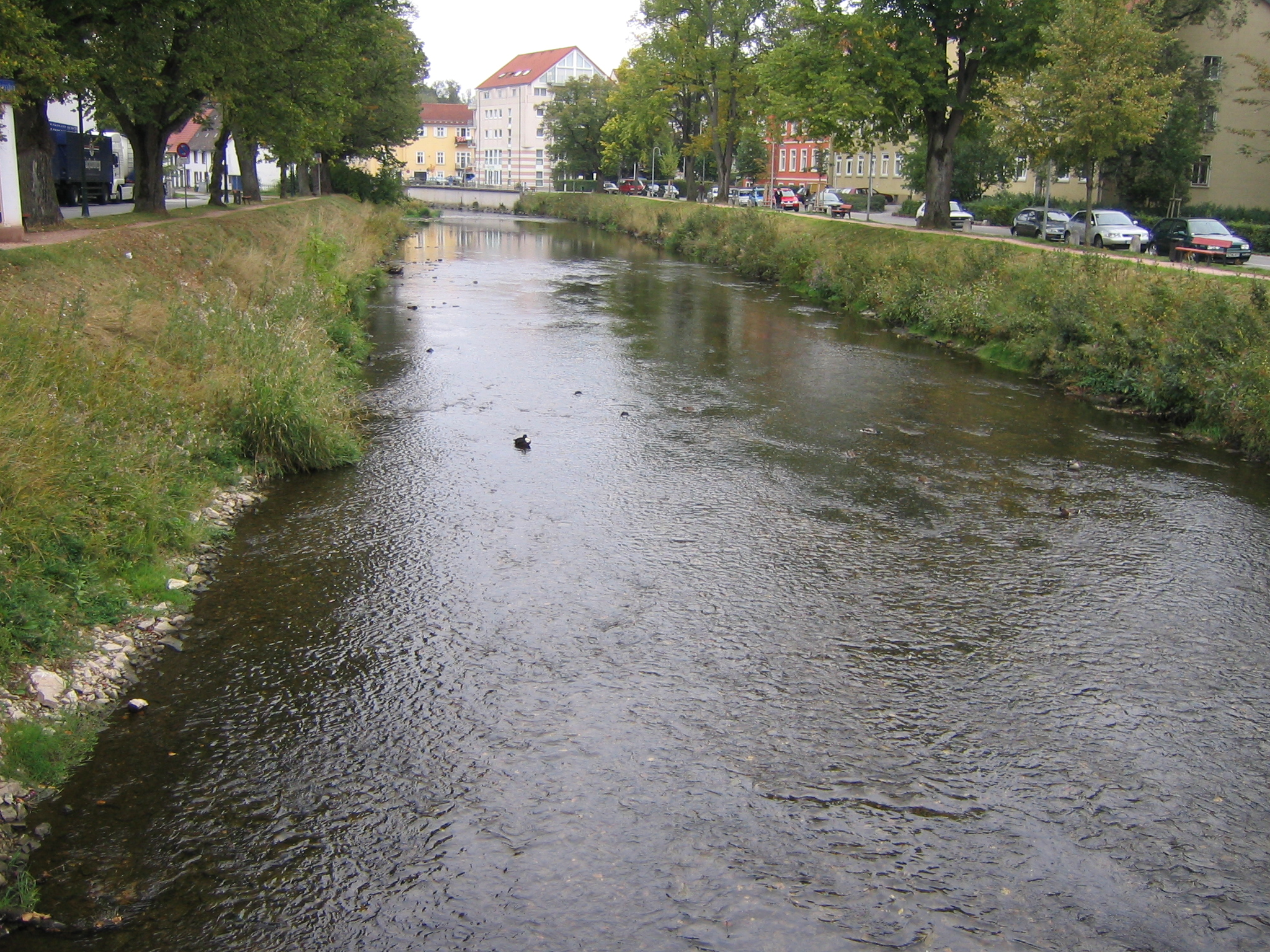
Die Brigach in Donaueschingen

From the start point at Donaueschingen railway station the route runs past the Kreiswehrersatzamt and then left initially along the Brigach, which it crosses on a wooden bridge by Saint Mary's Church. Following the edge of the wood, the walk reaches the village of Aufen and then Wolterdingen. In Wolterdingen the route turns right at the church and leaves the village along Emil-Hauger-Straße. After the end of the village it goes past the Upper Pond (‘’Oberen Weiher’’) to the right of the path, and then runs for about a kilometre parallel to the Landesstraße on a tarmac track to Tannheim. Passing through Tannheim the route passes a sawmill with a prominent chimney heading for Spitalhöfen, and then heads through the forest to Herzogenweiler. The route only grazes Herzogenweiler and leaves it along Jägerhausallee. At the end of the road the trail turns right. It then goes straight before turning right by a transmission tower on Linienweg, continuing to the forest car park of Schuhbartle. There it crosses the Kreisstraße 5734. The trail then goes along Alte Herzogenweiler Straße on the tarmac of the Kreisstraße, veers right off the metalled track and continues straight on along the road on a grass path to the Schlossermatte. On a bend it goes right, initially steeply uphill and then level over the Ochsenberg and descends again to Saint Michael’s Chapel, next to which there is a barbecue area. The route finally runs along a road to Vöhrenbach, to the end of this stage.

=== Second Stage: Vöhrenbach – Obersimonswald Engel ===
==== Overview ====
- Distance: 22.5 km
- Duration: c. 5 hours

Place/Attraction	Route (km)	Height (m above NHN)	Further information
Vöhrenbach	0	797	
Schönenbach	4.5	828	Village in the borough of Furtwangen
Furtwangen	3.5	870	Crosses the Mittelweg
Beim Staatsberghof	2.5	990	Crosses the Westweg
Südlicher Staatsberg / Winkel	1.0	1.045	
Gütenbach	3.0	827	
Teichschlucht	1.0	705	Crosses the Zweitälersteig
Wildgutach / Pfaffenmühle	1.0	612	Village in the borough of Simonswald
Vitenhof	1.0	548	Footbridge over the Wildgutach
Luxenhof	0.5	585	
Haldenschwarzhof	1.0	600	Crosses the Zweitälersteig
Obersimonswald Engel	3.5	450	Village in the borough of Simonswald; Crosses the Zweitälersteig; Gasthof Engel and bus stop

==== Route description ====
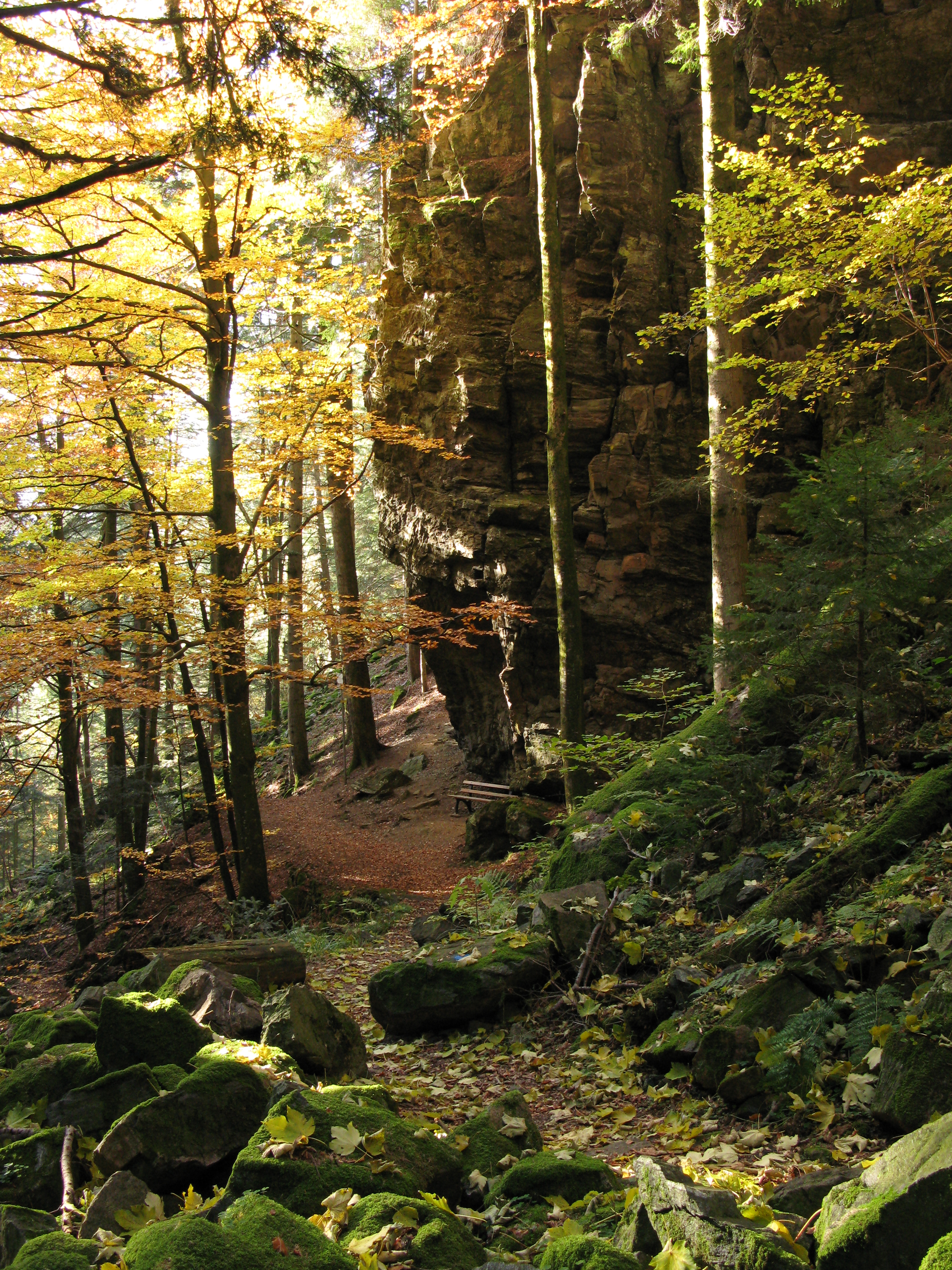
Teichschlucht

=== Third Stage: Obersimonswald Engel – Denzlingen ===
==== Overview ====
- Distance: 23.5 km
- Duration: c. 6 hours

Place/Attraction	Route (km)	Height (m above NHN)	Further information
Obersimonswald Engel	0	450	Gasthof Engel
Häuslerain	1.5	414	
Ibendörfle	3.0	388	
Ochsenbrücke (bridge)	1,5	361	
Café Märchengarten	1.5	328	
Niederbruck / Altsimonswald	0.5	325	
Am Ottensteg / Bleibach	3.0	299	Village in the borough of Gutach
Gutach	1.5	299	
Kollnau	1.0	281	Village in the borough of Waldkirch
Waldkirch	2.0	260	Crosses the Kandelhöhenweg; Crosses the Zweitälersteig
Mauracher Hof	6.0	245	
Chapel of St. Severin	0.5	278	ruins
Denzlingen	1.5	234	

=== Fourth Stage: Denzlingen – Oberrotweil ===
==== Overview ====
- Distance: 27.5 km
- Duration: c. 6.5 hours

Place/Attraction	Route (km)	Height (m above NHN)	Further information
Denzlingen	0	234	
Nimburg	10.5	187	Village in the borough of Teningen
Eichstetten	3.5	189	
Saint Catharine	6.5	492	Chapel
Auf dem Eck	3.0	400	hiking car park
Mondhalde	1.5	370	
Oberrotweil	2.5	240	Village in the borough of Vogtsburg im Kaiserstuhl

=== Fifth Stage: Oberrotweil – Breisach ===
==== Overview ====
- Distance: 10 km
- Duration: c. 2.5 hours

Place/Attraction	Route (km)	Height (m above NHN)	Further information
Oberrotweil	0	240	Village in the borough of Vogtsburg
Achkarren	3.0	228	Village in the borough of Vogtsburg
Breisach	7.0	189	
