= Karl Kempf =

German fighter ace (1920–1944)

Karl-Heinz Kempf
- Born: 2 February 1920; Niederwihl, Waldshut (district), Germany
- Died: 3 September 1944 (aged 24); Baal, Belgium
- Cause of death: Killed in action
- Military career
- Allegiance: Nazi Germany
- Branch: Luftwaffe
- Service years: 1937–1944
- Rank: Leutnant (second lieutenant)
- Units: JG 21, JG 54, JG 26
- Conflicts: World War II: Eastern Front; Western Front; Battle of France; Battle of Britain; Operation Barbarossa; Defence of the Reich
- Awards: Knight's Cross of the Iron Cross

Karl-Heinz Kempf (2 February 1920 – 3 September 1944) was a Luftwaffe fighter ace and recipient of the Knight's Cross of the Iron Cross during World War II. The Knight's Cross of the Iron Cross, and its variants were the highest awards in the military and paramilitary forces of Nazi Germany during World War II. Depending on source, Kempf was credited with either 64 or 65 aerial victories claimed in 445 combat missions. He was killed in action on 3 September 1944, shot down during takeoff at Grimbergen Airfield, Belgium.

== Early life and career ==
Kempf was born on 2 February 1920 in Niederwihl, now part of Görwihl, then in the Republic of Baden of the Weimar Republic. He joined the military service of the Luftwaffe in 1937. Following completion of flight and fighter pilot training, (Note: Flight training in the Luftwaffe progressed through the levels A1, A2 and B1, B2, referred to as A/B flight training. A training included theoretical and practical training in aerobatics, navigation, long-distance flights and dead-stick landings. The B courses included high-altitude flights, instrument flights, night landings and training to handle the aircraft in difficult situations.) Kempf was posted to 2. Staffel (2nd squadron) of Jagdgeschwader 21 (JG 21–21st Fighter Wing). JG 21 had been created on 15 July 1939 with a single Gruppe (group) under the command of Hauptmann Martin Mettig while 2. Staffel was headed by Oberleutnant Leo Eggers. Equipped with the Messerschmitt Bf 109 D-1, the Gruppe was ordered to Gutenfeld, present-day Lugovoye, in July 1939.

== World War II ==
World War II in Europe began on Friday 1 September 1939 when German forces invaded Poland. On 10 May 1940, German forces launched Fall Gelb (Case Yellow), the initial phase of the Battle of France. During this campaign, I. Gruppe of JG 21 was subordinated to Jagdgeschwader 27 (JG 27—27th Fighter Wing). Initially based at München Gladbach, present-day Mönchengladbach, the Gruppe supported German forces fighting in the Battle of Fort Ében-Émael and the crossing of the river Meuse. On 12 May, the Gruppe moved to Vogelsang Airfield located approximately 20 kilometers (12 miles) southeast of Aachen. That day, Kempf claimed his first aerial victory when he shot down a Hawker Hurricane fighter near Brussels. Following the German advance, the Gruppe had relocated to Cambrai Airfield. Here on 26 May, the Gruppe had aerial combat with French and British fighters in the combat area of Cambrai and Arras, claiming 18 aerial victories for the loss of two Bf 109s and one pilot killed in action. At the end of this engagement, Kempf was credit with an aerial victory over a Morane-Saulnier M.S.406 fighter claimed near Cambrai.

On 22 June 1940, I. Gruppe of JG 21 was withdrawn from France and returned to München Gladbach. The following day the Gruppe was ordered to Soesterberg in the Netherlands. On 2 July, the unit moved to Bergen op Zoom. Three days later I. Gruppe of JG 21 was renamed and became the III. Gruppe of Jagdgeschwader 54 (JG 54–54th Fighter Wing). The Gruppe stayed in the Netherlands until 9 August when it was ordered to an airfield at Guînes where it participated in the Battle of Britain against the Royal Air Force (RAF). Here on 5 September, Kempf claimed his first aerial victory over the RAF when he shot down a Hurricane. On 9 September, Kempf claimed a Supermarine Spitfire fighter shot down. During this engagement, his Bf 109 E was damaged, resulting in a belly landing at Guînes. He claimed his fifth in total and last aerial victory of the Battle of Britain on 14 September over a Hurricane fighter. For this, he had been awarded both classes of the Iron Cross (Eisernes Kreuz).

On 29 March 1941, III. Gruppe was ordered to Graz-Thalerhof in preparation for the Balkans campaign. On 20 April, III. Gruppe was withdrawn from combat operation, relocating to Belgrad-Semlin. On 4 May, the Gruppe began its transfer to Airfield Stolp-Reitz in Pomerania, present-day Słupsk, by train, arriving at Stolp-Reitz on 10 May.

=== Operation Barbarossa ===
At Stolp-Reitz, JG 54 upgraded their aircraft to the Bf 109 F-2. For the next four weeks, the pilots familiarized themselves with the new aircraft before on 15 June, III. Gruppe was ordered to Blumenfeld in East Prussia, present-day Karczarningken in the Kaliningrad Oblast, in preparation for Operation Barbarossa, the invasion of the Soviet Union. During the upcoming invasion, JG 54 would be deployed in the area of Army Group North, was subordinated to I. Fliegerkorps (1st Air Corps) and supported the 16th and 18th Army as well as the Panzer Group 4 in their strategic objective to reach Leningrad. On 23 June, Kempf claimed his first aerial victory on the Eastern Front, a Tupolev SB bomber.

On 26 June, LVI Panzer Corps under command of General der Infanterie Erich von Manstein had reached Daugavpils in southern Latvia. A formation of Soviet Tupolev SB bombers attempted to attack Manstein's forward Panzer columns. The bombers were intercepted by 7. Staffel of JG 54 claiming eight bombers shot down, including four credited to Kempf. Three days later, Kempf's Bf 109 F-2 (Werknummer 8113—factory number) suffered engine failure, resulting in a forced landing southwest of Daugavpils. Flying in the combat area of Leningrad on 17 September, Kempf became an "ace-in-a-day", claiming five aerial victories, taking his total to 23. His first claim of the day killed Mladshiy Leytenant Yegor Novikov, a Hero of the Soviet Union, from 191 IAP (Istrebitelny Aviatsionny Polk—Истребительный Авиационный Полк or Fighter Aviation Regiment) near Krasnoye Selo. (Note: In his book Black Cross / Red Star The Air War Over the Eastern Front, Volume I, Operation Barbarossa 1941 from 2000, Christer Bergström speculates that Max-Hellmuth Ostermann could have been the victor of Yegor Novikov. His book from 2007, Barbarossa - The Air Battle: July–December 1941, attributes the aerial victory over Novikov to Kempf.)

By the end of 1941, Kempf was credited with 36 aerial victories and had been awarded the German Cross in Gold (Deutsches Kreuz in Gold) on 24 November. (Note: According to Weal on 24 September 1941, and according to Obermaier on 1 December 1941.) On 2 January 1942, Kempf again became an "ace-in-a-day", claiming five aerial victories including a Petlyakov Pe-2 bomber over the Ziverskaya Airfield. He was awarded the Knight's Cross of the Iron Cross (Ritterkreuz des Eisernen Kreuzes) on 4 February 1942 following his 41st aerial victory. On 11 June, Kempf's Bf 109 F-4 (Werknummer 13143) was hit by anti-aircraft artillery leading to a forced landing 15 kilometers (9.3 miles) north of Novgorod. In September 1942, Kempf was transferred and became a fighter pilot instructor, first with Ergänzungs-Jagdgruppe Ost and then with Ergänzungs-Jagdgruppe West.

=== On the Western Front and death ===
In late May 1943 after a tour as an instructor, Kempf was posted to 11. Staffel of JG 54 which was based on the Western Front in defense of the Reich. 11. Staffel of JG 54 had its origin from 11. Staffel of Jagdgeschwader 26 "Schlageter" (JG 26—26th Fighter Wing). In January 1943, the Luftwaffe had planned to move JG 26 to the Eastern Front in exchange JG 54 which supported Army Group North. In order to keep up operations, the exchange was planned by rotating each Gruppe by Gruppe and every Staffel by Staffel. In this context, 11. Staffel of JG 54 was to be integrated into II. Gruppe of JG 54. On 22 May, 11. Staffel of JG 54 was ordered to Nordholz Airfield where it was subordinated to III. Gruppe of JG 26. The Staffel was ordered to Lille-Vendeville on 15 June where it was briefly controlled by the Geschwaderstab (headquarters unit) of JG 26. On 1 July, the Staffel was renamed and again became 11. Staffel of JG 26, a Staffel of III. Gruppe. Here on 16 August, Kempf claimed his first aerial victory while flying with JG 26 when he shot down a Douglas A-20 Havoc bomber, also known as "Boston", in a location 5 kilometers (3.1 miles) north of Auxi-le-Château.

On 1 December, Kempf claimed his first heavy bomber. That day, he shot down a Boeing B-17 Flying Fortress near Zülpich on a United States Army Air Forces (USAAF) VIII Bomber Command mission to Solingen. On 20 December, VIII Bomber Command flew a mission against Bremen. Defending against this attack, III. Gruppe pilots claimed five B-17 bombers shot down without loss, including one by Kempf. Two days later, Kempf was shot down and wounded in aerial combat with a B-17 bomber. Hit by the defensive fire of a B-17, he was forced to bail out of his Bf 109 G-6/U4 (Werknummer 440012) near Rheine on the Dortmund–Ems Canal, keeping him grounded for some time.

After the Allies launched Operation Overlord, the invasion of Normandy on 6 June 1944, Luftflotte Reich sent additional units to the invasion front. By 8 June, Jagdgeschwader 1, Jagdgeschwader 3, Jagdgeschwader 11 and III. Gruppe of JG 54 had arrived in France and were subordinated to Fliegerkorps II. III. Gruppe of JG 26 was based at Villacoublay Airfield. On 7 June, Kempf claimed the destruction of two Republic P-47 Thunderbolt fighter east of Dreux.

On 3 September, JG 26 retreated from Belgium with Geschwaderstab and I. Gruppe headed for Krefeld Airfield, II. Gruppe to Kirchhellen, now part of Bottrop, and III. Gruppe to München Gladbach. At Grimbergen Airfield, 2. Staffel was last to take off and immediately came under attack of six to eight North American P-51 Mustang fighters from the 38th Fighter Squadron of the 55th Fighter Group. In this attack, four Focke-Wulf Fw 190 fighters of 2. Staffel were shot down, including Kempf who was killed in action. His Fw 190 A-8 (Werknummer 171739) crashed near Baal. His victor may have been Lieutenant Darrel Stuart Cramer.

== Summary of career ==
=== Aerial victory claims ===
According to US historian David T. Zabecki, Kempf was credited with 65 aerial victories. Spick also lists him with 65 aerial victories claimed in 445 combat missions. Of this figure, 49 aerial victories were claimed on the Eastern Front and 16 over the Western Allies, including two four-engine bombers. Mathews and Foreman, authors of Luftwaffe Aces — Biographies and Victory Claims, researched the German Federal Archives and found records for 64 aerial victory claims. This figure includes 49 aerial victories on the Eastern Front and another 15 on the Western Front, including three four-engined bombers.

Victory claims were logged to a map-reference (PQ = Planquadrat), for example "PQ 29173". The Luftwaffe grid map (Jägermeldenetz) covered all of Europe, western Russia and North Africa and was composed of rectangles measuring 15 minutes of latitude by 30 minutes of longitude, an area of about 360 square miles (930 km^{2}). These sectors were then subdivided into 36 smaller units to give a location area 3 km × 4 km (1.9 mi × 2.5 mi) in size.

Chronicle of aerial victories
This and the ♠ (Ace of spades) indicates those aerial victories which made Kempf an "ace-in-a-day", a term which designates a fighter pilot who has shot down five or more airplanes in a single day. This and the ? (question mark) indicates information discrepancies listed by Prien, Stemmer, Rodeike, Bock, Mathews and Foreman.
Claim	Date	Time	Type	Location	Claim	Date	Time	Type	Location
– 2. Staffel of Jagdgeschwader 21 – Battle of France — 10 May – 25 June 1940
1	12 May 1940	10:05	Hurricane	Brussels	2	26 May 1940	09:15	M.S.406	Cambrai
– 9. Staffel of Jagdgeschwader 54 – Action at the Channel and over England — 26 June 1940 – 29 March 1941
3	5 September 1940	10:50	Hurricane		5	14 September 1940	19:20	Hurricane	
4	9 September 1940	18:35	Spitfire						
– 7. Staffel of Jagdgeschwader 54 – Operation Barbarossa — 22 June – 5 December 1941
6	23 June 1941	11:57	SB-2		20♠	17 September 1941	10:48	I-18 (MiG-1)	vicinity of Leningrad
7	26 June 1941	19:25	SB-2	Dünaburg	21♠	17 September 1941	17:20	I-18 (MiG-1)	vicinity of Leningrad
8	26 June 1941	19:26	SB-2	Dünaburg	22♠	17 September 1941	17:23	I-18 (MiG-1)	vicinity of Leningrad
9	26 June 1941	19:27	SB-2	Dünaburg	23♠	17 September 1941	17:28? (Note: According to Mathews and Foreman claimed at 17:35.)	I-18 (MiG-1)	vicinity of Leningrad
10	26 June 1941	19:30	SB-2	Dünaburg	24	19 September 1941	11:03	I-153	
11	6 July 1941	10:02	SB-3	east of Ostrov	25	25 September 1941	17:42	I-18 (MiG-1)	
12	6 July 1941	10:04	SB-3	east of Ostrov	26	25 September 1941	17:45	I-153	
13	21 July 1941	20:57	SB-3		27	26 September 1941	12:03	I-18 (MiG-1)	
14	28 July 1941	20:02	I-16? (Note: According to Mathews and Foreman claimed as a Mikoyan-Gurevich MiG-1.)	east of Lake Ilmen	28	26 September 1941	12:08	Pe-2	
15	1 August 1941	19:04	DB-3		29	9 October 1941	07:18	I-18 (MiG-1)	
16	8 September 1941	09:15	I-16		30	9 October 1941	07:25	I-18 (MiG-1)	
17	8 September 1941	09:18	I-16		31	11 October 1941	11:10	I-26 (Yak-1)	
18	11 September 1941	10:23	I-153		32	19 November 1941	08:25	I-153? (Note: According to Mathews and Foreman claimed as a Curtiss P-40 Warhawk.)	
19♠	17 September 1941	10:45? (Note: According to Mathews and Foreman claimed at 10:55.)	I-16	vicinity of Leningrad	33	19 November 1941	08:35	PS-84	
– 7. Staffel of Jagdgeschwader 54 – Eastern Front — 6 December 1941 – 30 April 1942
34	29 December 1941	11:49	I-153		38♠	2 January 1942	12:31	I-18 (MiG-1)	Novaya Ladoga
35	29 December 1941	11:50	I-153		39♠	2 January 1942	12:45	I-16	Grjadi
36	29 December 1941	12:00	I-16		40♠	2 January 1942	12:50	I-16	Grjadi
37♠	2 January 1942	12:30	I-18 (MiG-1)	Novaya Ladoga	41♠	2 January 1942? (Note: According to Mathews and Foreman claimed on 4 January 1942.)	13:10	Pe-2	Siverskaya
– 7. Staffel of Jagdgeschwader 54 – Eastern Front — 1 May – August 1942
42	25 May 1942	09:04	P-40	PQ 29173; 10 km (6.2 mi) southwest of Malaya Vishera	49	12 June 1942	19:56	MiG-3	
43	25 May 1942	09:05	P-40	PQ 29173; 10 km (6.2 mi) southwest of Malaya Vishera	50	12 June 1942	19:57	Yak-1	
44	25 May 1942	09:08	Yak-1	PQ 29171; 45 km (28 mi) northeast of Staraya Russa	51	12 June 1942	20:00	Yak-1	
45	9 June 1942	12:22	Pe-2		52	29 June 1942	16:42	Yak-1	PQ 00134 over sea, north-northeast of Hungerburg
46	9 June 1942	12:27	P-40		53	22 August 1942	11:02	LaGG-3	PQ 00282; 20 km (12 mi) west of Mga
47	10 June 1942	19:52	MiG-3? (Note: According to Mathews and Foreman claimed as a Mikoyan-Gurevich MiG-1.)		54	27 August 1942	11:31	Il-2	PQ 10181 east of Mga
48	10 June 1942	19:54	MiG-3						
– 11. Staffel of Jagdgeschwader 26 "Schlageter" – On the Western Front and Defense of the Reich — 23 May – 31 December 1943
55	16 August 1943	18:57	Boston	5 km (3.1 mi) north of Auxi-le-Château	57	20 December 1943	12:25	B-17	PQ 05 Ost S/CQ-6; Neuenburg
56	1 December 1943	12:12	B-17	PQ 05 Ost S/OO-1, Zülpich	58	22 December 1943	14:08	B-17	10 km (6.2 mi) southeast of Meppel
– 9. Staffel of Jagdgeschwader 26 "Schlageter" – Western Front — June – July 1944
59	7 June 1944	08:51	P-47	PQ 04 Ost N/AD-3 east of Dreux	62	4 July 1944	14:42? (Note: According to Mathews and Foreman claimed at 14:32.)	P-47	PQ 04 Ost N/AB-1 southwest of Évreux
60	12 June 1944	06:14	P-47	PQ 05 Ost UA-2; Lisieux	63	4 July 1944	14:43	Spitfire	PQ 04 Ost N/AB-1 southwest of Évreux
61	21 June 1944	19:37	P-51	PQ 04 Ost N/AD-5 east of Dreux					
– 2. Staffel of Jagdgeschwader 26 "Schlageter" – Western Front — August – 3 September 1944
64	26 August 1944	09:33	Spitfire	PQ 04 Ost TC-4; Rouen					

=== Awards ===
- Iron Cross (1939) 2nd and 1st Class
- Honor Goblet of the Luftwaffe (7 August 1941)
- German Cross in Gold on 24 November 1941 as Oberfeldwebel in the 7./Jagdgeschwader 54
- Knight's Cross of the Iron Cross on 4 February 1942 as Oberfeldwebel and pilot in the 7./Jagdgeschwader 54
