= Schluchseewerk =

Coordinates: 47°33′27″N 8°02′44″E

Schluchseewerk AG
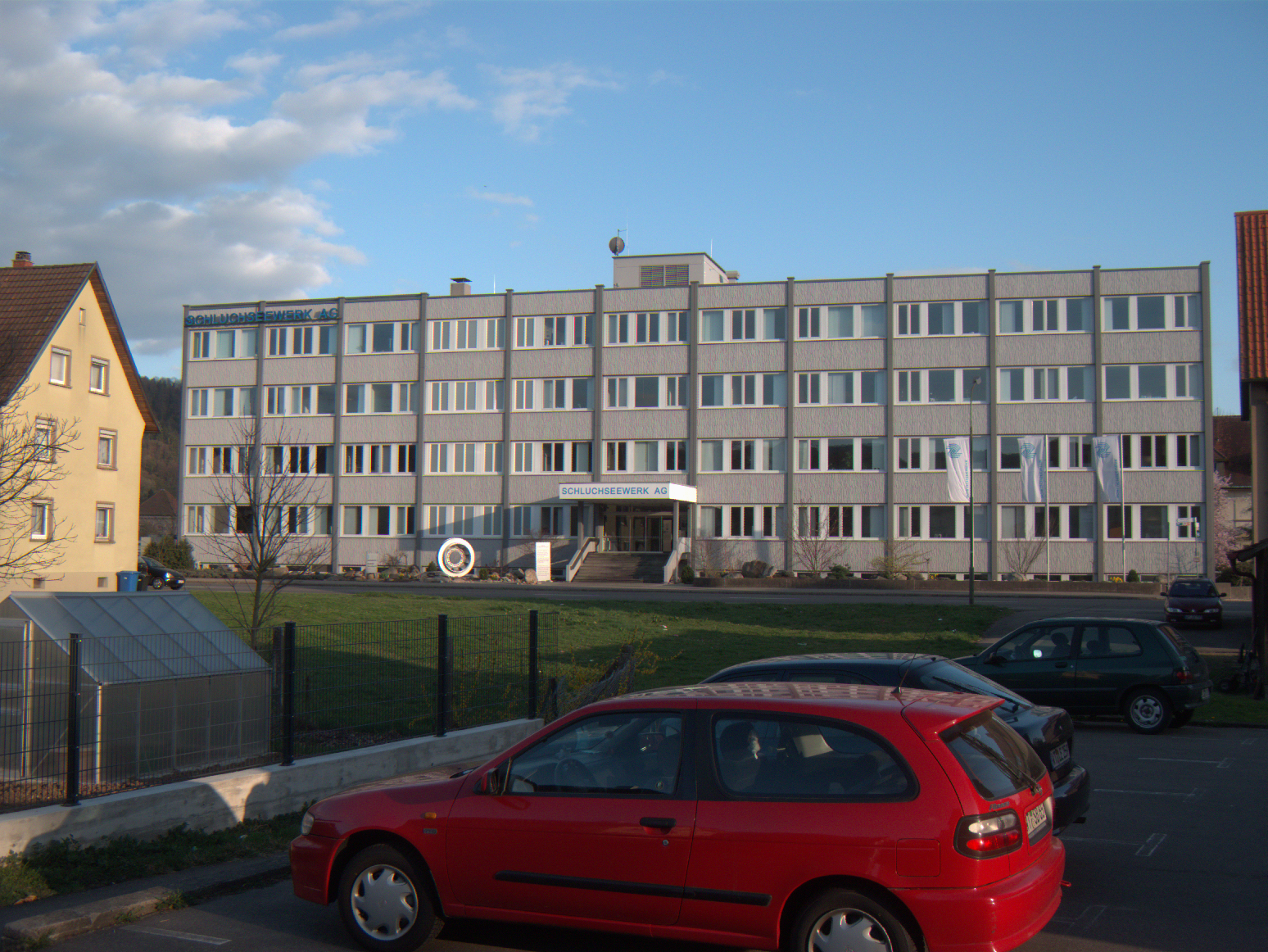
- Company type: Limited company (Aktiengesellschaft)
- Industry: Kraftwerksbetrieb
- Founded: 1928
- Headquarters: Laufenburg (Baden), Deutschland
- Revenue: 100 million euros (2015)
- Website: www.schluchseewerk.de

The Schluchseewerk AG is the operator of five pumped storage hydroelectric power stations in the Southern Black Forest in the German state of Baden-Württemberg. Its head office is in Laufenburg (Baden).

The shareholders of the Schluchseewerk are RWE (50%), EnBW (37.5%), Energiedienst (7.5%) and Energiedienst Holding (5%) (the last two are subsidiaries of EnBW).

== History ==
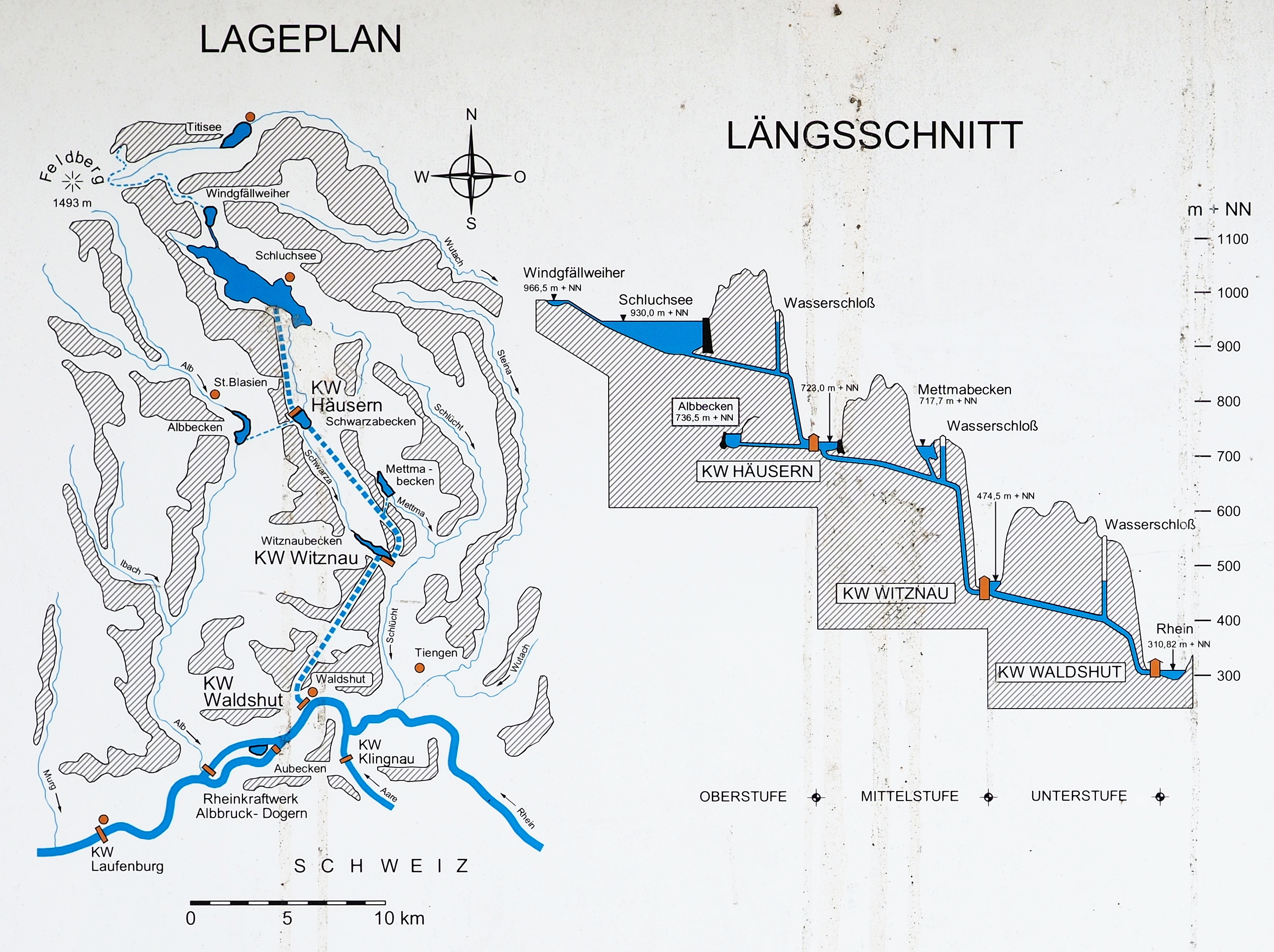
Schematic drawing of the three power stations forming the Schluchsee group

The Schluchseewerk was founded in 1928. Its head office was in Freiburg in Rempartstraße 14–16. In 1931 Häusern Power Station joined the network. Whilst work on Witznau Power Station had to be delayed until 1943 as a result of the Great Depression, work on Waldshut Power Station was completely halted in 1944 due to the Second World War Not until 1951 (six years after the end of the war) was the power station finished. Both projects involved the engineer and, later, federal service cross (Bundesverdienstkreuzträger) holder, Erich Pfisterer. In 1951, the company picked up plans for the Wutach Dam and expanded them comprehensively. For nature conservation and environmental reasons as well as widespread opposition by the local population, the project was axed in 1960 by the state government.

In 1967 the Säckingen underground power station, which was fed by the Eggberg Basin, was added to the network. At the same time the Kühmoos load balancing and power switching station (Lastverteilung/Schaltanlage Kühmoos) was opened as a control centre for all Schluchseewerk-operated pumped storage hydroelectric power stations. In 1976, the Wehr underground power station and the Wehra and Hornberg Basins were added to the system. Due to renovation work the level of the Schluchsee was lowered in 1983, which brought numerous onlookers to the reservoir.

Since 2004, the Schluchseewerk has had the engineering and business operating lead for the Albbruck-Dogern Power Station. This run-of-the-river hydroelectric power station was expanded in December 2009 by a weir power station and delivers an average of 650 million kilowatt-hours of power per year. The reservoir of this Rhine power station uses the Waldshut Power Station as a lower reservoir.

Head office was moved in late 2006 to Laufenburg (Baden).

== Literature ==
- Adolf Eisenlohr: Das Schluchseewerk. In: Die Bautechnik, 8th annual, Issue 17 (18 April 1930), pp. 259–263.
