= Wehra =

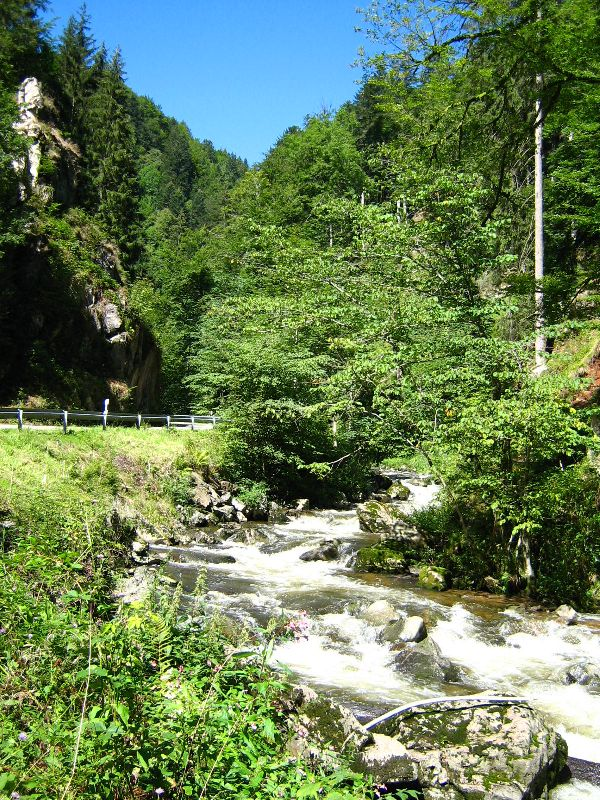
- The Wehra in its gorge-like middle reaches

Location
- Country: Germany
- State: Baden-Württemberg
- Reference no.: DE: 2314

Physical characteristics
- Source
  - location: In the Berglewald of Todtmoos, east of the village centre
  - coordinates: 47°45′01″N 8°01′47″E
  - elevation: about 1,080 m above sea level (NN)
- Mouth
  - location: Near Brennet, borough of Wehr into the Rhine
  - coordinates: 47°34′55″N 7°54′13″E
  - elevation: etwa 283 m above sea level (NN)
- Length: 26.1 km (16.2 mi)
- Basin size: 114.8 km²
- Discharge
  - location
  - average: 3.71 m³/s
  - minimum: Average low: 680 L/s
  - maximum: Average high: 32.84 m³/s

Basin features
- Progression: Rhine→ North Sea
- Landmarks: Small towns: Wehr; Villages: Todtmoos, Herrischried, Gersbach
- Tributaries
  - right: Rüttebach (main river), Rotmoosbach, Brandbach, Hasel
- Waterbodies: Reservoirs: Wehra Reservoir

Wehra is a river of Baden-Württemberg, Germany. It passes through Todtmoos and Wehr and flows into the Rhine downstream of Bad Säckingen.

== Geography ==
=== Location and topography ===
The valley of the Wehra is distinctly divided into three sections.

The upper reaches are a high valley typical of the Black Forest, but at 200 to 300 meters deep, they are significantly more relief-like than the neighboring high valleys of the Hotzenwald to the east. Its center is the village of Todtmoos, which occupies the largest part of the valley, which was noticeably reshaped by ice-age glaciers.

In its middle course, the Wehra cuts a gorge, sometimes over 400 meters deep, into the southwestern slopes of the Black Forest. Steep, wooded slopes alternate with cliffs almost 100 meters high in some places. This steep section of the river is a nationally renowned, extremely difficult whitewater stretch. A rocky outcrop there bears the name Hirschsprung (Stag's Leap).

The approximately seven-kilometer-long lower valley section separates the barely structured, steep, 500-meter-high western slope of the Hotzenwald from the heavily karstified plateau of the Dinkelberg, which rises only a little over 100 meters west of the Wehra valley. The main town in this broad valley is the small industrial town of Wehr, which is, however, increasingly attracting tourists. Near the Brennet district, the Wehra flows into the Rhine, still within sight of the town of Bad Säckingen, which lies upstream.

== See also ==
- List of rivers of Germany
  - List of rivers of Baden-Württemberg
