= Wehra Dam =

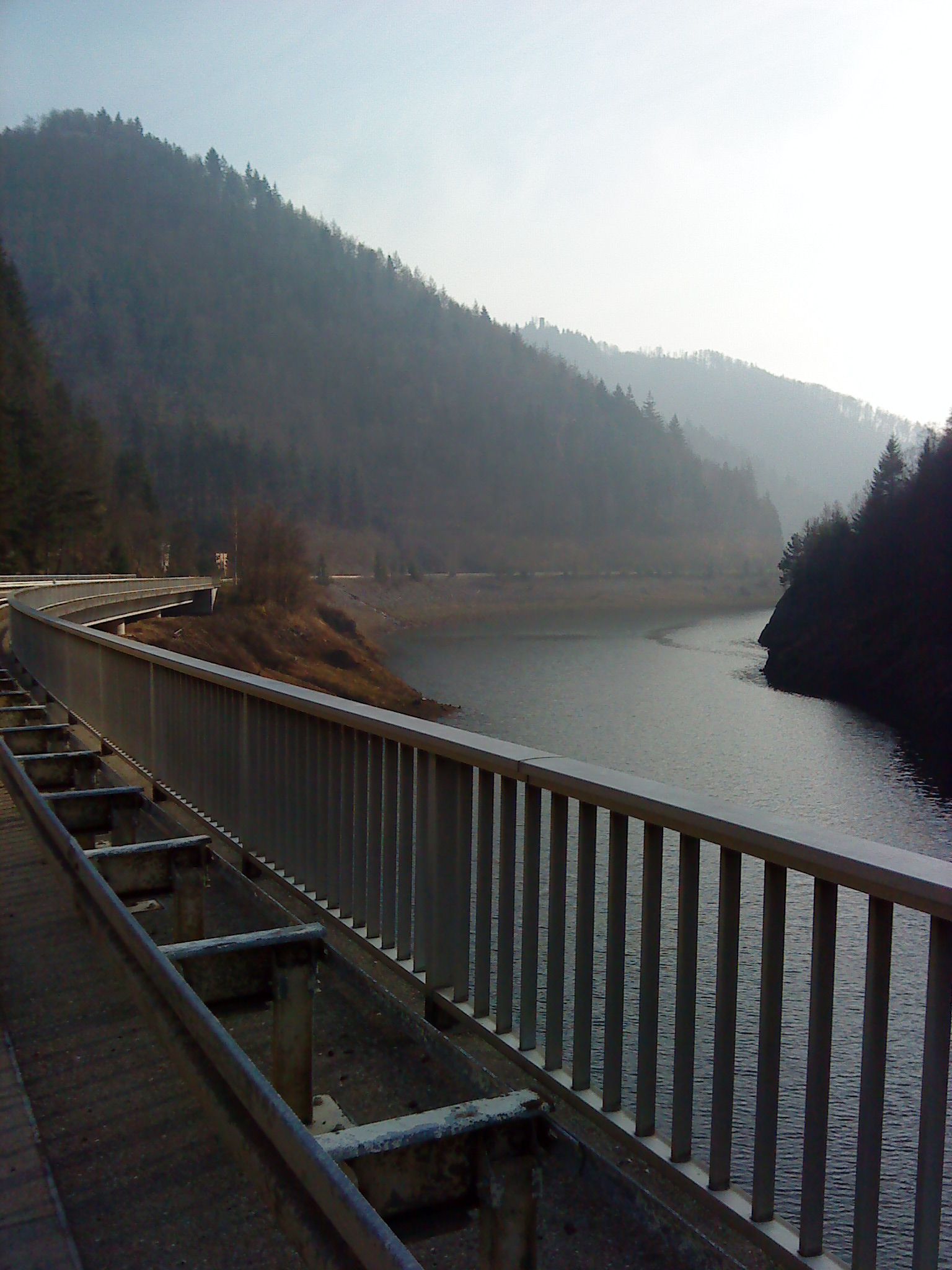
- The reservoir; the dam is behind the right-hand bend in the lake.
- Interactive map of Wehra Dam
- Location: Waldshut, Germany
- Construction began: 1971–1974

Dam and spillways
- Impounds: Wehra
- Height (foundation): 50 m
- Height (thalweg): 37 m
- Length: 235 m (771 ft)
- Elevation at crest: 420.50 m
- Width (crest): 5 m
- Dam volume: 400000 m^{3}

Reservoir
- Total capacity: 4.10 Mm³
- Active capacity: 4.10 Mm³
- Catchment area: 66.15 km²
- Surface area: 0,25 km²
- Maximum length: 1.6 km
- Maximum width: 0.2 km
- Normal elevation: 419 m

The Wehra Dam (German: Wehratalsperre) is a dam which impounds the River Wehra near Wehr in the county of Waldshut in the German state of Baden-Württemberg. Its reservoir forms the lower basin of the Hornberg stage (Wehr Power Station) and it is thus part of the Schluchseewerk network. The upper basin of the pumped-storage power station is the Hornberg Basin; the cavern with its power station lies inside the mountain about halfway between the two basins.

== See also ==
- List of dams in Germany

== Literature ==
- Peter Franke, Wolfgang Frey: Talsperren in der Bundesrepublik Deutschland. DNK – DVWK 1987, ISBN 3-926520-00-0.
