= Fohrenbühl =

German mountain pass

Coordinates: 48°14′N 7°57′E

Highest point
- Elevation: 786 m (2,579 ft)

Geography
- Location: Baden-Württemberg, Germany

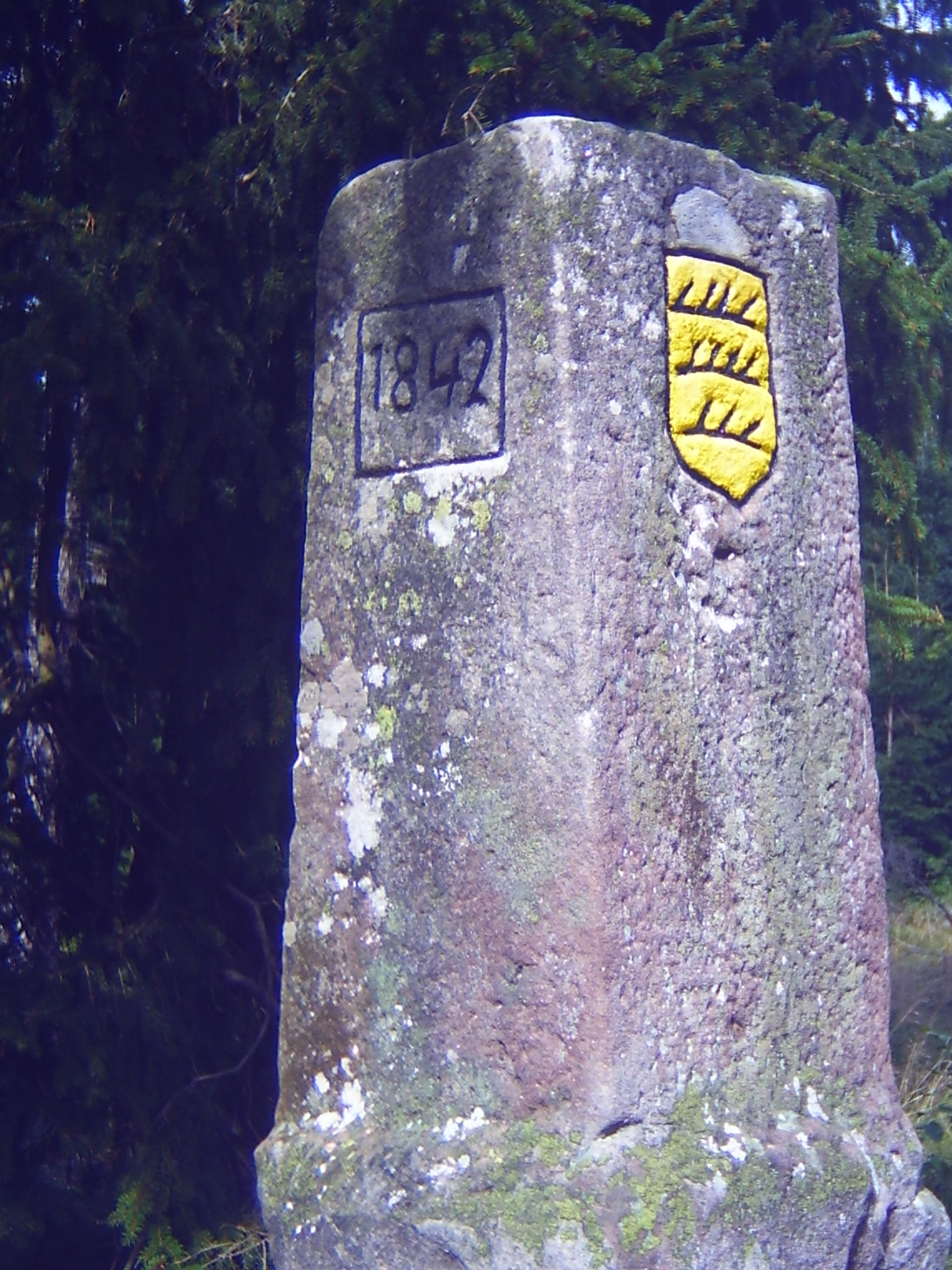
Boundary stone between Baden and Württemberg

Fohrenbühl is a mountain of Baden-Württemberg, Germany.
