= Laufenburg, Germany =

Laufenburg
- Town
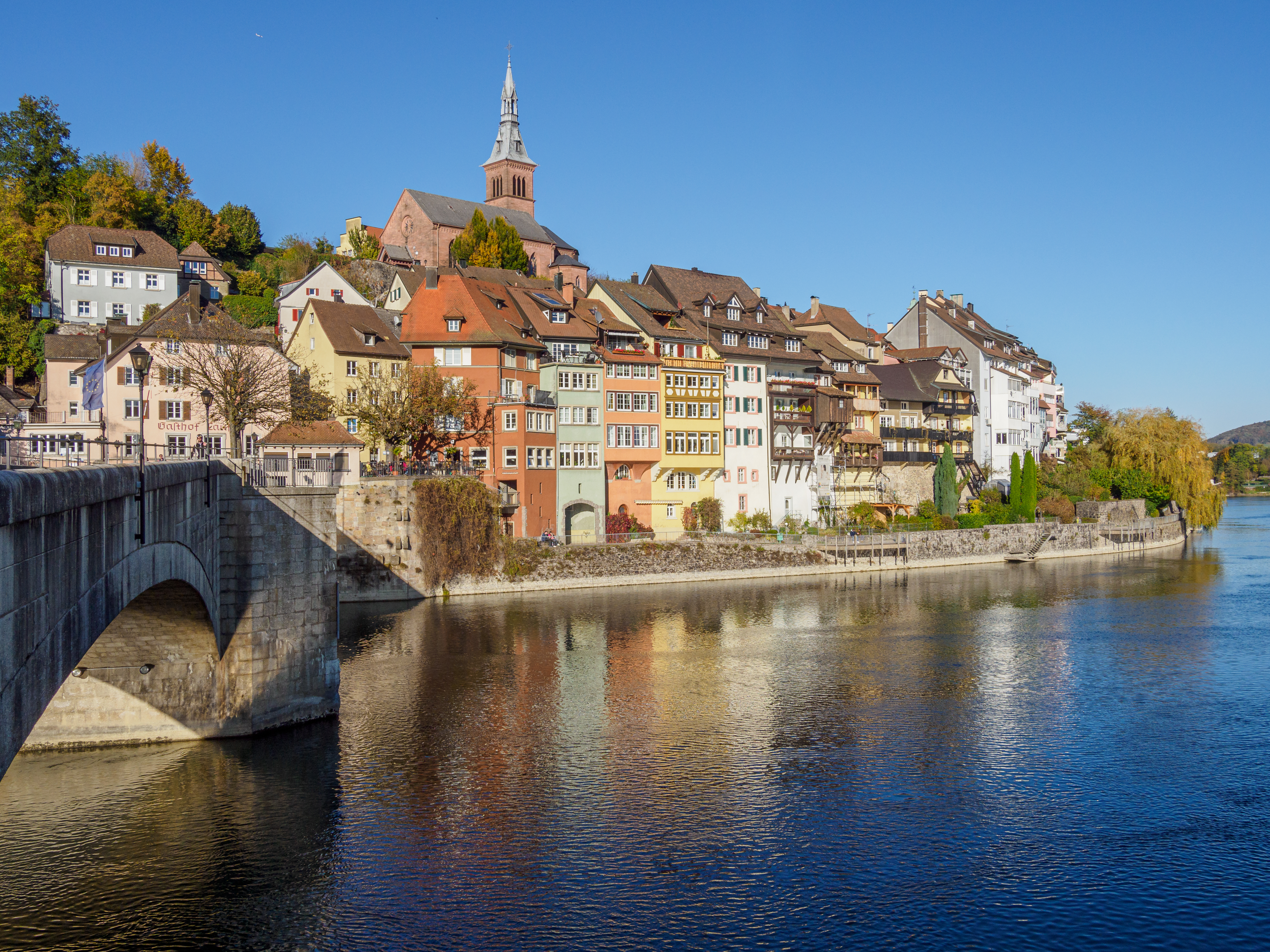
- View from CH-Laufenburg to D-Laufenburg.

- Coat of arms

- Location of Laufenburg within Waldshut district
- Interactive map of Laufenburg
- Location within Germany Location within Baden-Württemberg
- Coordinates: 47°33′56″N 08°03′53″E
- Country: Germany
- State: Baden-Württemberg
- Admin. region: Freiburg
- District: Waldshut
- Subdivisions: 8 Stadtteile

Government
  - Mayor (2016–24): Ulrich Krieger

Area
  - Total: 23.55 km^{2} (9.09 sq mi)
- Elevation: 337 m (1,106 ft)

Population (2025-12-31)
  - Total: 9,268
  - Density: 393.5/km^{2} (1,019/sq mi)
- Time zone: UTC+01:00 (CET)
  - Summer (DST): UTC+02:00 (CEST)
- Postal codes: 79725
- Dialling codes: 07763, 07753
- Vehicle registration: WT
- Website: www.laufenburg.de

Laufenburg (German pronunciation: [ˈlaʊfn̩ˌbʊʁk]) is a town in Baden-Württemberg, Germany, part of the Waldshut district. It has approximately 4300 inhabitants (including 6 outskirts 8300 inhabitants). Laufenburg is separated from a Swiss city with the same name by the river Rhine.

== Cities in the near vicinity ==
- Near surrounding (<15 km): Bad Säckingen, Waldshut-Tiengen, Rickenbach (Hotzenwald), Albbruck, Murg am Hochrhein, Stein AG
- Further away (>15 km): Lörrach, Basel, Brugg, Aarau, Zürich, Schaffhausen, St. Blasien, Todtmoos, Freiburg

== City administration ==
The city of Laufenburg encompasses also Binzgen, Grunholz, Hauenstein, Hochsal, Luttingen, Rhina, Rotzel, Stadenhausen.

== Brief history ==
The city was first noted in 1207. In November 1638 one side of the city was taken by Imperial forces. The bridge across the Rhine was burned afterwards.

Laufenburg was one city until about 1800 when Napoleon divided the city, ordering that the Rhine should become the border. Ever since the two cities have been separated by nationality. The city was well placed on major rapids of the Rhine, which allowed the town to collect taxes as well as catch salmon. In the early 20th century the rapids were demolished in order to build a hydroelectric power plant.

=== Bridge construction ===
In December 2004 a new bridge was opened to the east of the city, replacing the previous bridge which had become too congested, because the roads connecting the bridge were single lane roads but were being used for two way traffic. With the opening of the new bridge a new shopping development was erected to the east of the town.

Its construction was hampered by a major engineering mistake. For reasons of politics and budgets, Switzerland and Germany each constructed half the bridge, rather than one unified contractor doing everything. The half-bridges needed to align precisely on height. Switzerland and Germany use different references for sea-level: the Mediterranean Sea and North Sea respectively. The result is that height above sea level differs by 270 millimetres (0.89 ft) between the two references. This quirk was known to the engineers and they accounted for it, but the calculations made a sign error. Rather than cancelling out this known difference, it instead doubled it to 540 millimetres (1.77 ft).
