= Mettma =

River in Germany

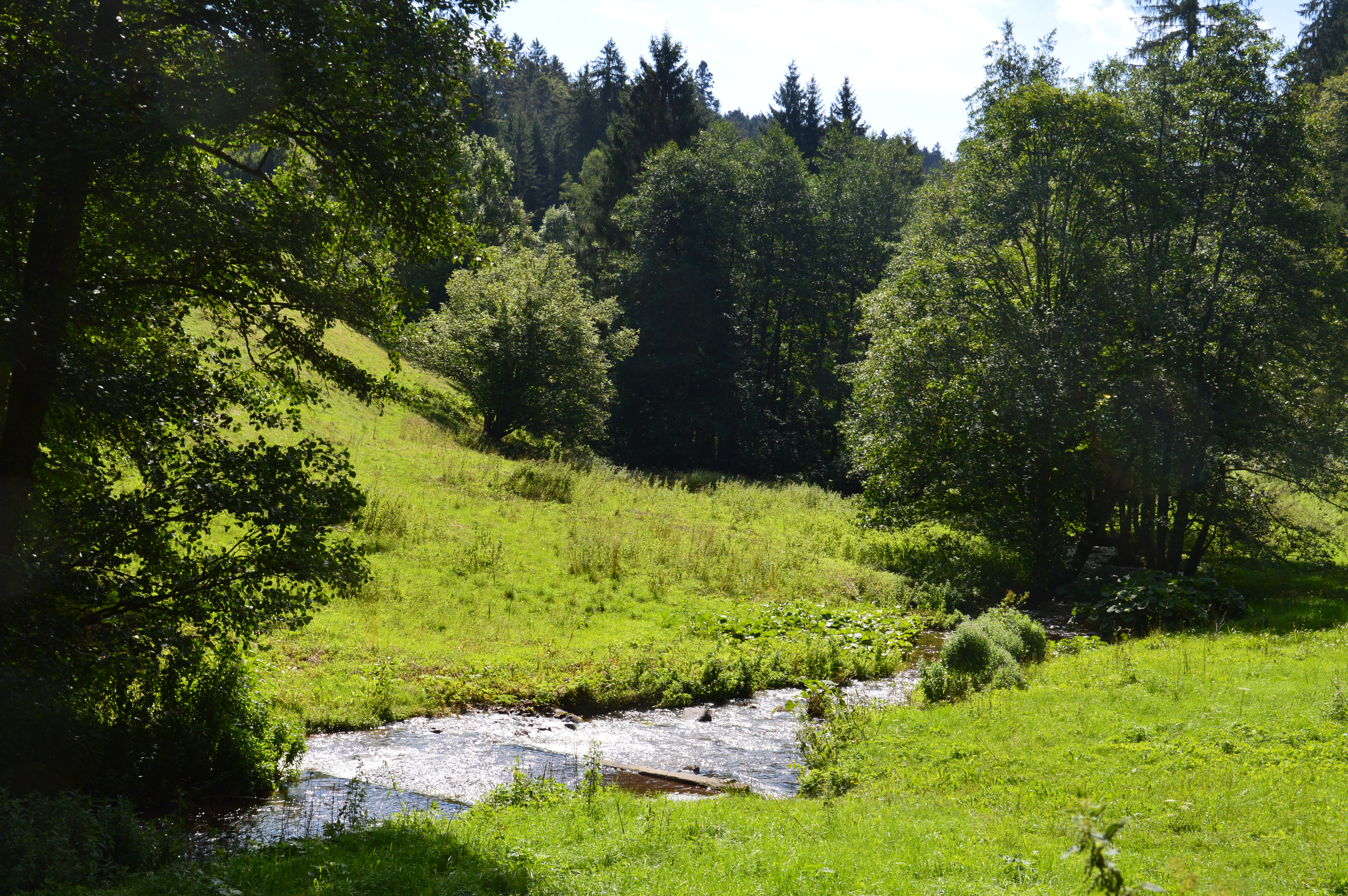

Location
- Country: Germany
- State: Baden-Württemberg

Physical characteristics
- Mouth
  - location: Schlücht
  - coordinates: 47.6953°N 8.2810°E
- Length: 17.2 km (10.7 mi)

Basin features
- Progression: Schlücht→ Wutach→ Rhine→ North Sea

Mettma is a river of Baden-Württemberg, Germany. It flows into the Schlücht near Ühlingen-Birkendorf.

== See also ==
- List of rivers of Baden-Württemberg
