= Schwarzwaldverein =

Voluntary association

Black Forest Association
- Schwarzwaldverein
- Purpose: Maintenance of hiking trails in the Black Forest region
- Location: Black Forest (Germany)
- Origins: 1864

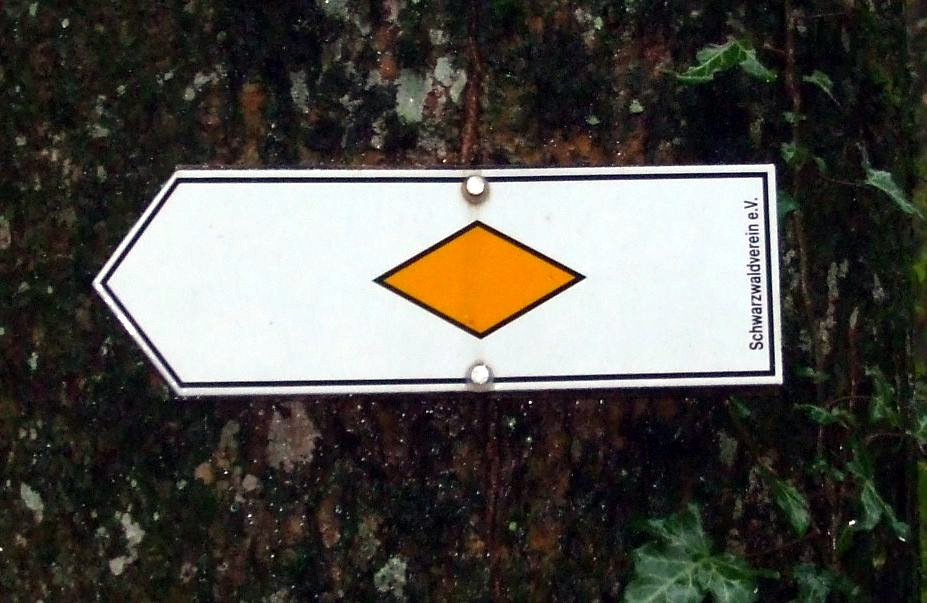
A Schwarzwaldverein trail marker.

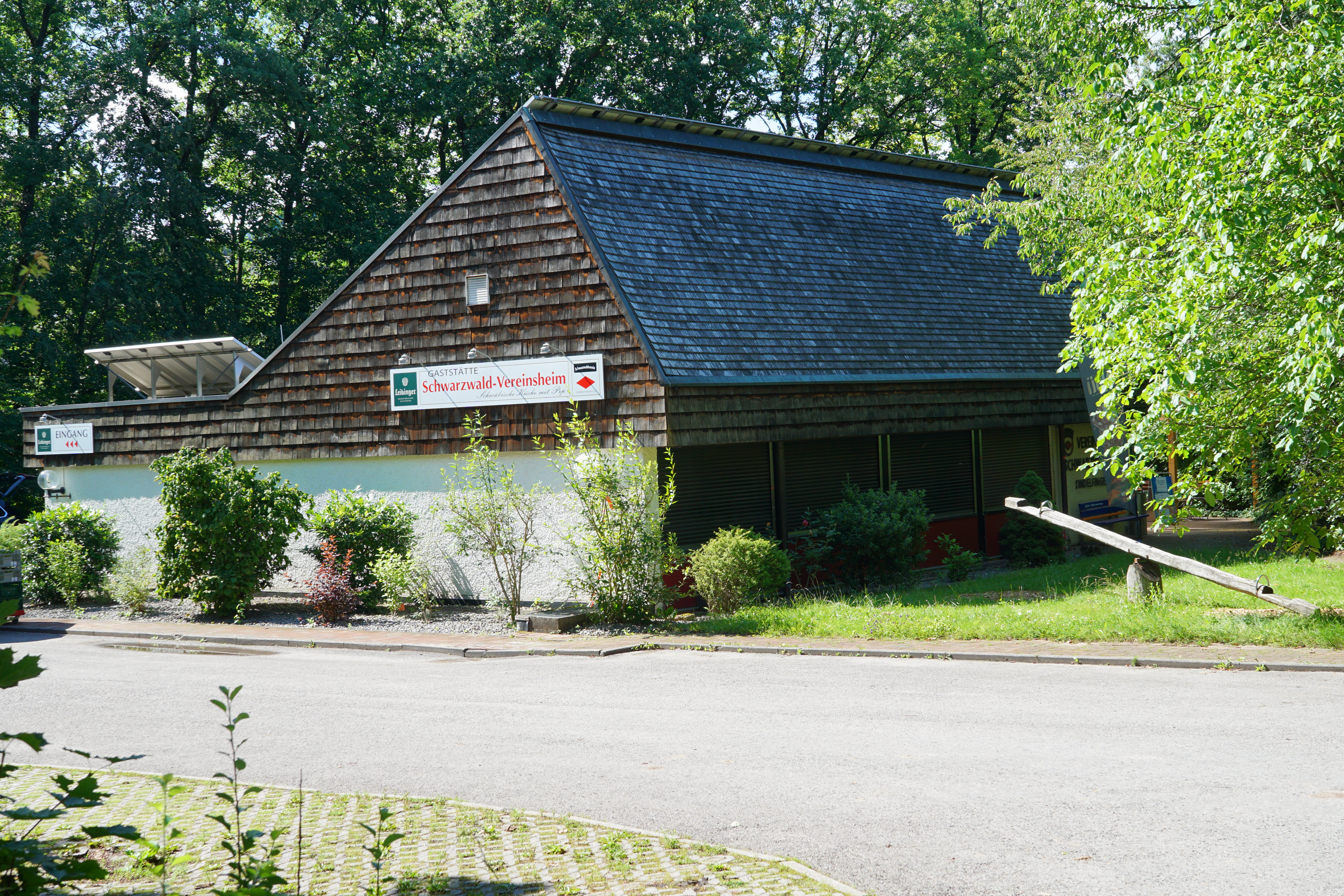
Club hut in Sindelfingen

The Schwarzwaldverein (Black Forest Club or Black Forest Association) was founded in Freiburg im Breisgau (Germany) in 1864, making it the oldest German hiking and mountaineering club. The Schwarzwaldverein has almost 90,000 members in 241 local chapters. Activities of the club include hiking, environmental protection, the promotion of local culture (Heimatpflege), trail maintenance, and family and youth work projects in the Black Forest.

== Organisation ==
The Schwarzwaldverein consists of the main association and 241 independent local member chapters. The local chapters are organized into 17 regions, and have a membership of almost 90,000 members. The executive committee consists of three members, and the current president is Eugen Dieterle. In addition to the executive committee, there are nine divisional officers, each of whom is responsible for coordinating specific parts of the club's activities. The main offices are in Freiburg.

== Trail Maintenance ==
The Schwarzwaldverein in responsible for a network of hiking trails spread throughout the entire Black Forest region. The so-called "Main trails", the Westweg, Mittelweg, and Ostweg (West, Middle, and East Trails), run in a north–south direction. Other north-south trails are the Kandelhöhenweg and the Ortenau Wine Path in the west, as well as the Gäurandweg in the east. The "Cross-trails" (Querwege) run in an east–west direction: the Cross-trail Gengenbach-Alpirsbach, Cross-trail Rottweil-Lahr, Cross-trail Freiburg-Bodensee, the Black Forest-Kaiserstuhl-Rhein Cross-trail, the Hotzenwald Cross-trail, and others. All trails are marked with a colored lozenge. In the 1990s a long-distance bike trail was added parallel to the Westweg starting in Karlsruhe and ending in Basel.

== "Youth in the Schwarzwaldverein" ==
The "Youth in the Schwarzwaldverein" (Jugend im Schwarzwaldverein) is an independent youth organization of the Schwarzwaldverein with a membership of around 11,000, composed of all members 27 years of age and under. Many different levels of activities are offered, including regular meetings, excursions, and camps. The regional offices offer regional camps and advanced training for leaders from the local chapters. The main office offers large camps, experiential learning opportunities and training for members and non-members.

== See also ==
- Schwäbischer Albverein
- Black Forest
