= Weilheim, Baden-Württemberg =

Weilheim
- Municipality
- Coat of arms

- Location of Weilheim within Waldshut district
- Interactive map of Weilheim
- Location within Germany Location within Baden-Württemberg
- Coordinates: 47°39′30″N 08°14′26″E
- Country: Germany
- State: Baden-Württemberg
- Admin. region: Freiburg
- District: Waldshut

Government
  - Mayor (2018–26): Jan Albicker

Area
  - Total: 35.65 km^{2} (13.76 sq mi)
- Elevation: 517 m (1,696 ft)

Population (2025-12-31)
  - Total: 3,171
  - Density: 88.95/km^{2} (230.4/sq mi)
- Time zone: UTC+01:00 (CET)
  - Summer (DST): UTC+02:00 (CEST)
- Postal codes: 79809
- Dialling codes: 07741
- Vehicle registration: WT
- Website: www.weilheim-baden.de

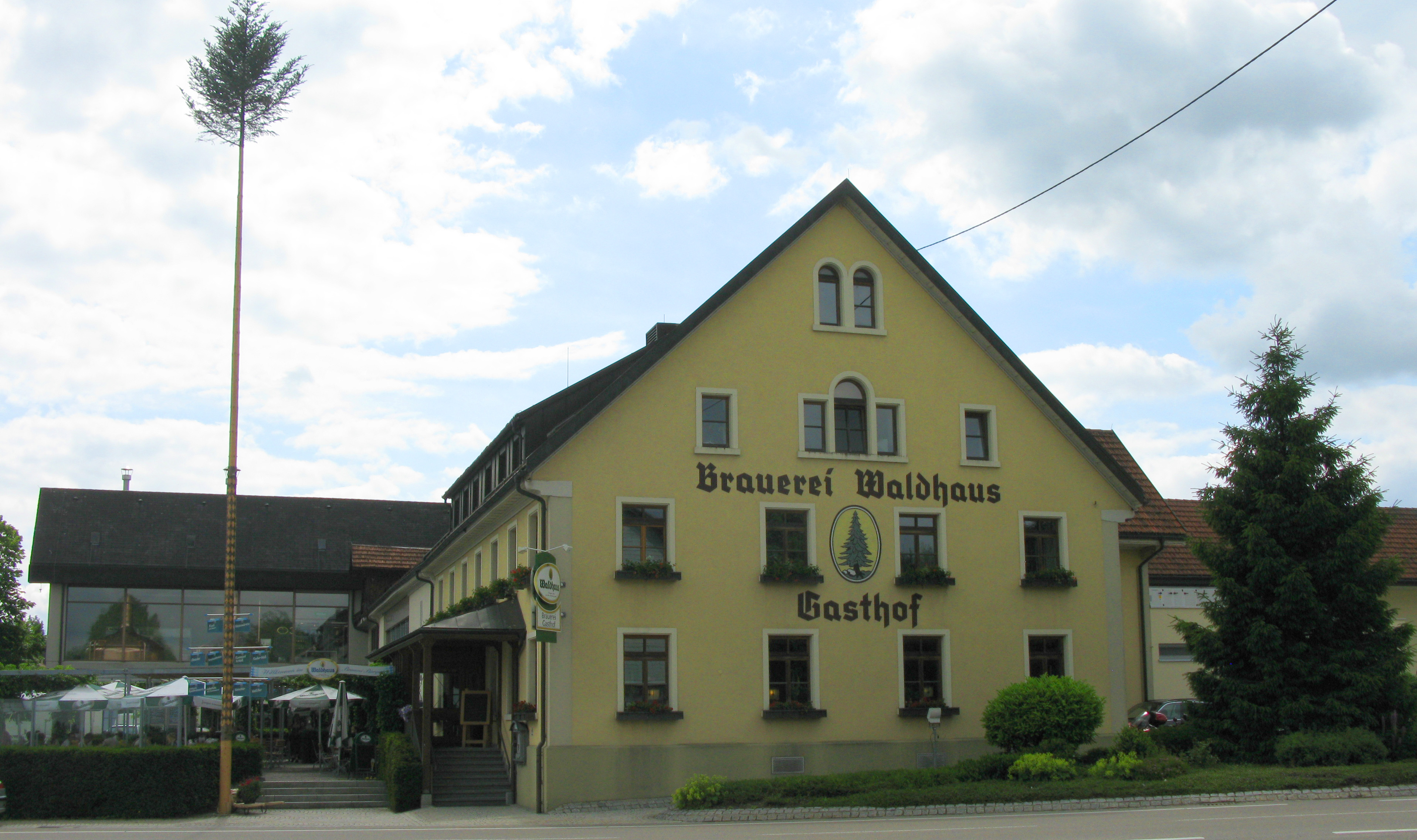
Weilheim

Weilheim (German pronunciation: [ˈvaɪlhaɪm]) is a municipality in the district of Waldshut in Baden-Württemberg in Germany.

== See also ==
- List of cities and towns in Germany
