= Rickenbach, Baden-Württemberg =

Rickenbach
- Municipality
- Coat of arms

- Location of Rickenbach within Waldshut district
- Interactive map of Rickenbach
- Location within Germany Location within Baden-Württemberg
- Coordinates: 47°37′13″N 07°58′42″E
- Country: Germany
- State: Baden-Württemberg
- Admin. region: Freiburg
- District: Waldshut

Government
  - Mayor (2021–29): Dietmar Zäpernick

Area
  - Total: 34.65 km^{2} (13.38 sq mi)
- Elevation: 696 m (2,283 ft)

Population (2025-12-31)
  - Total: 3,788
  - Density: 109.3/km^{2} (283.1/sq mi)
- Time zone: UTC+01:00 (CET)
  - Summer (DST): UTC+02:00 (CEST)
- Postal codes: 79736
- Dialling codes: 07765
- Vehicle registration: WT
- Website: www.rickenbach.de

Rickenbach (German pronunciation: [ˈʁɪkn̩bax]) is a municipality in the district of Waldshut in Baden-Württemberg in Germany.

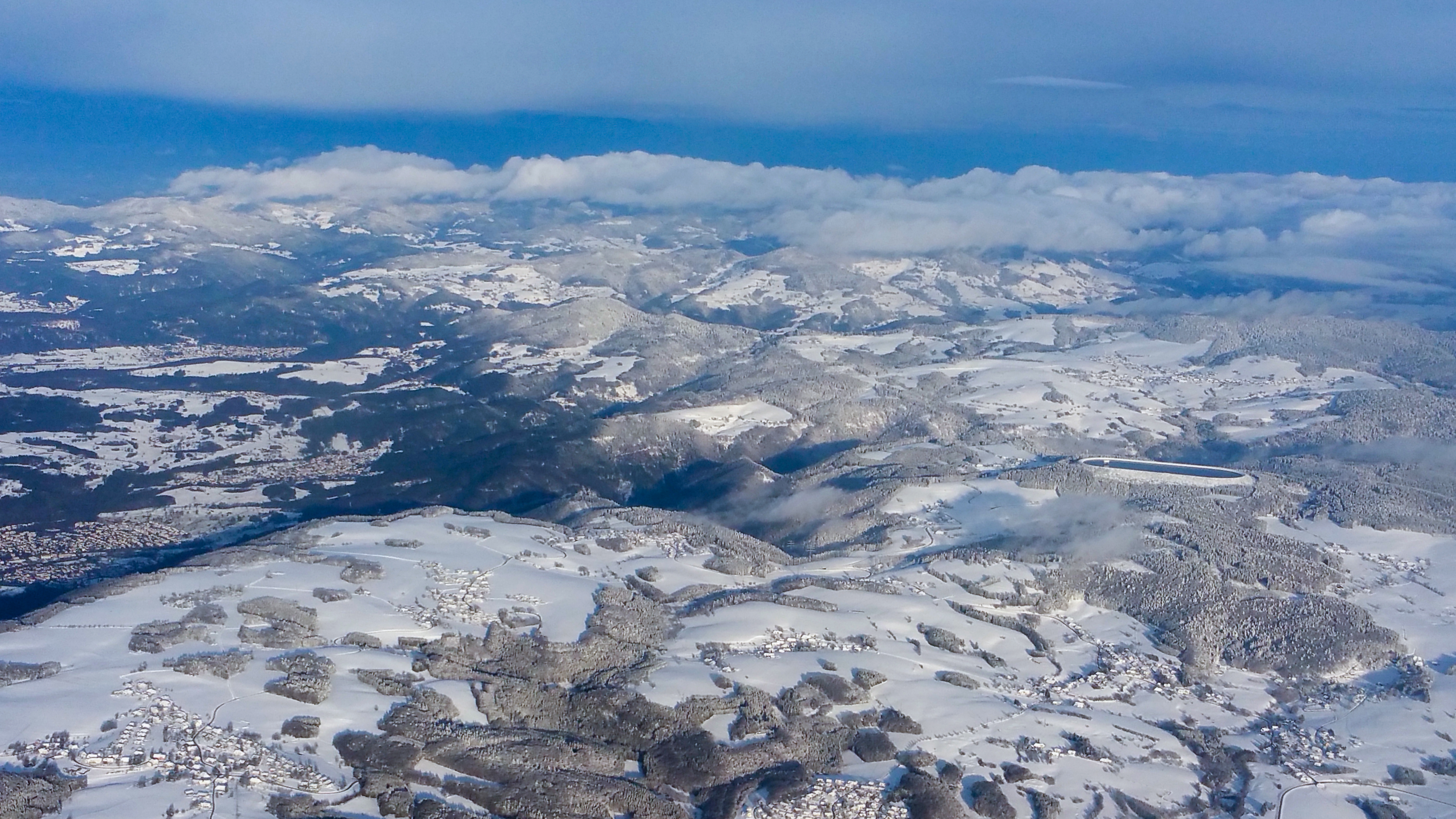
Aerial view of Rickenbach
