= Herrischried =

- Municipality
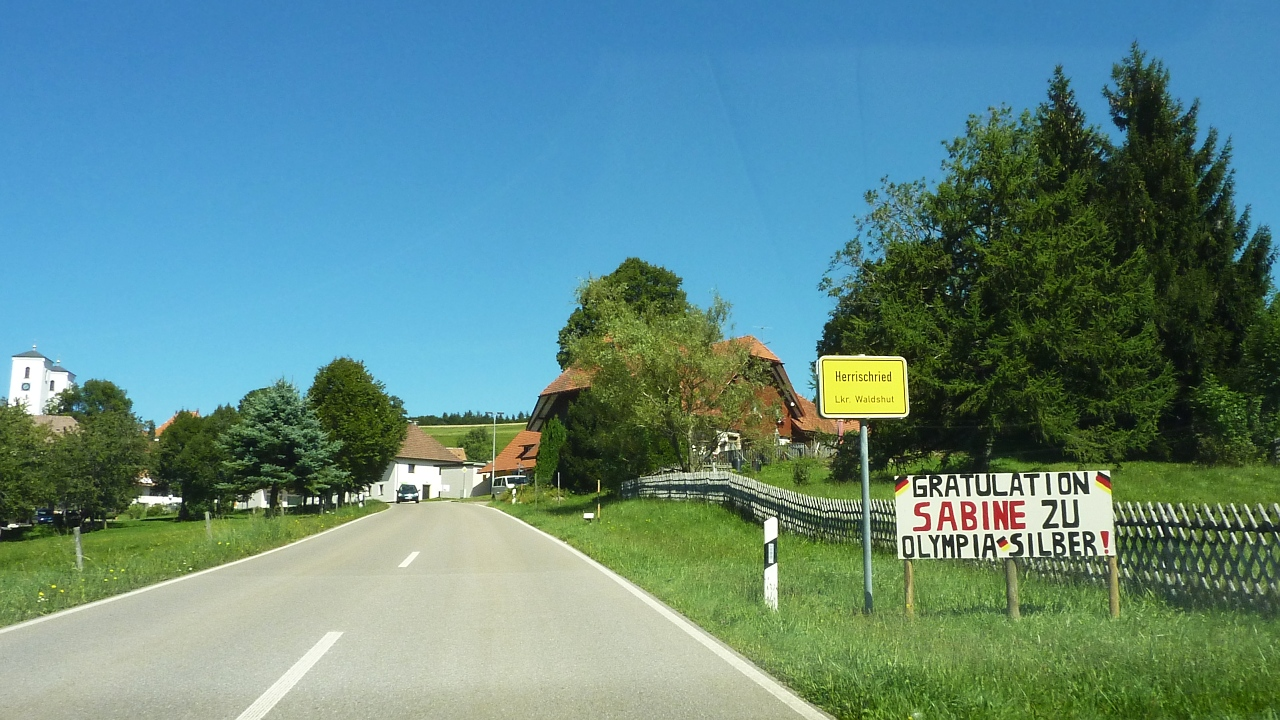

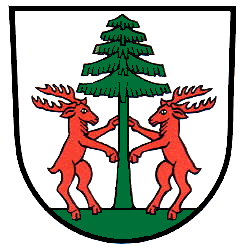
- Coat of arms

- Location of Herrischried within Waldshut district
- Interactive map of Herrischried
- Location within Germany Location within Baden-Württemberg
- Coordinates: 47°40′N 08°00′E
- Country: Germany
- State: Baden-Württemberg
- Admin. region: Freiburg
- District: Waldshut

Government
  - Mayor (2020–28): Christian Dröse

Area
  - Total: 37.51 km^{2} (14.48 sq mi)
- Elevation: 884 m (2,900 ft)

Population (2025-12-31)
  - Total: 2,632
  - Density: 70.17/km^{2} (181.7/sq mi)
- Time zone: UTC+01:00 (CET)
  - Summer (DST): UTC+02:00 (CEST)
- Postal codes: 79737
- Dialling codes: 07764
- Vehicle registration: WT
- Website: www.herrischried.de

Herrischried (German pronunciation: [ˈhɛʁɪʃʁiːt]) is a municipality in the district of Waldshut in Baden-Württemberg in Germany.
