= Albbruck =

German municipality

- Municipality
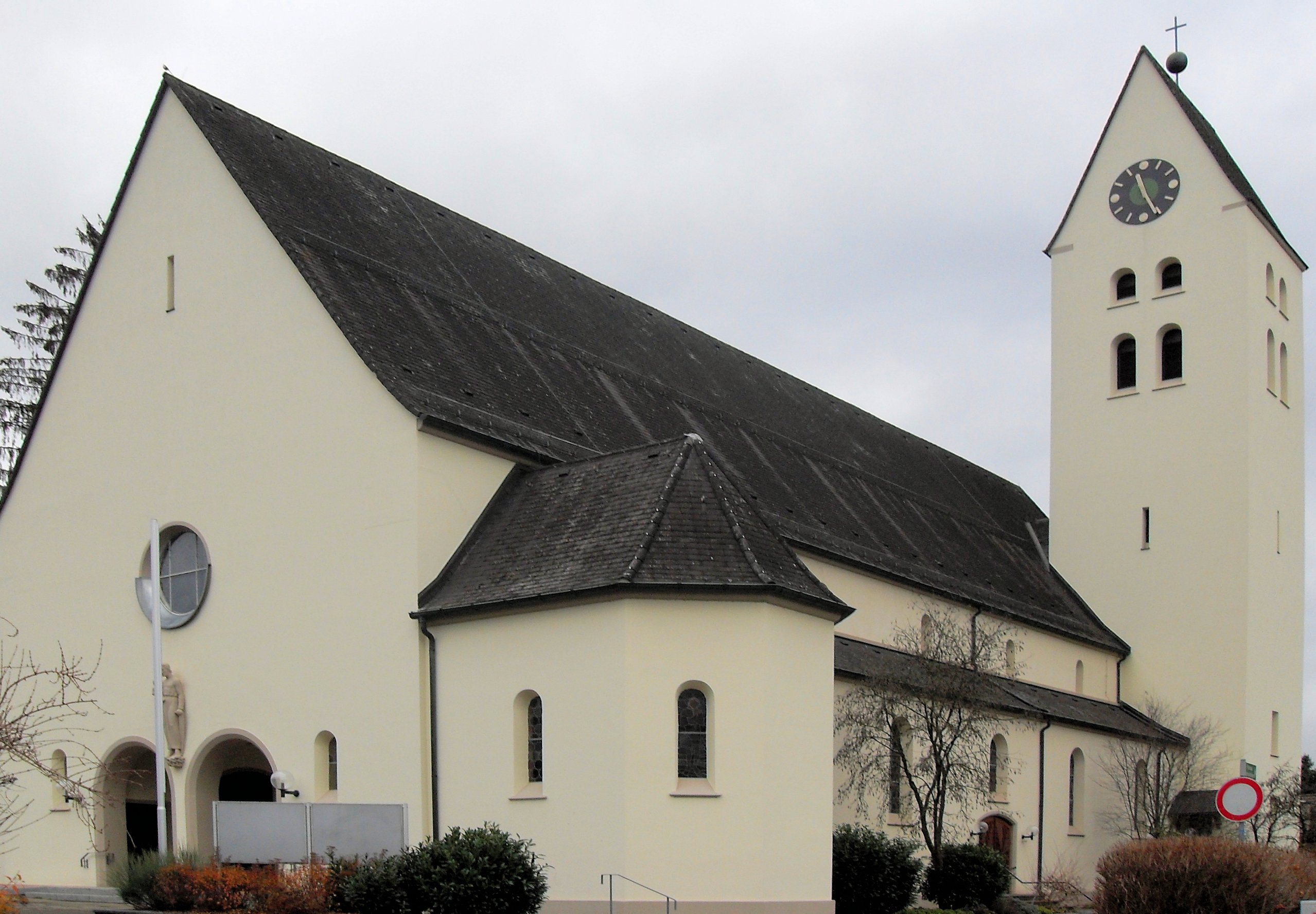
- Church of Saint Joseph

- Coat of arms

- Location of Albbruck within Waldshut district
- Interactive map of Albbruck
- Location within Germany Location within Baden-Württemberg
- Coordinates: 47°35′21″N 08°07′45″E
- Country: Germany
- State: Baden-Württemberg
- Admin. region: Freiburg
- District: Waldshut

Government
  - Mayor (2023–31): Stefan Kaiser

Area
  - Total: 39.69 km^{2} (15.32 sq mi)
- Elevation: 324 m (1,063 ft)

Population (2025-12-31)
  - Total: 7,284
  - Density: 183.5/km^{2} (475.3/sq mi)
- Time zone: UTC+01:00 (CET)
  - Summer (DST): UTC+02:00 (CEST)
- Postal codes: 79774
- Dialling codes: 07753
- Vehicle registration: WT
- Website: www.albbruck.de

Albbruck is a municipality of the district of Waldshut in Baden-Württemberg, Germany. It is on the southwestern border of Germany with Switzerland.

== History ==
In 1805 during the process of German mediatisation, a restructuring of certain jurisdictions, Albbruck became a possession of the Grand Duchy of Baden. In 1939, the town was assigned to the district of Waldshut. Through much of this period, it was rural and agricultural.

Decades after World War II, beginning in the 1970s, Albbruck underwent a period of growth. Residential areas were developed on the west side of the town and commercial space to its north. A new town hall was constructed in 1973. The municipality also grew in geographic area in that period, adding Birkingen, Buch, and Unteralpfen with Albbruck on 1 January 1975. A new town center was completed in 2000.

== Geography ==
The municipality (Gemeinde) of Albbruck lies at the southern edge of the district of Waldshut in Baden-Württemberg, a state of the Federal Republic of Germany. It lies along the High Rhine and the national border with Switzerland, and extends from there north into the Hotzenwald.

The municipality is crossed by the chine valleys of the Mühlbach and Alb rivers. The valley of the former is a Federally-protected nature reserve and the latter forms part of the municipality's northwest border. Elevation above sea level in the municipal area ranges from a high of 729 meters (2,392 ft) Normalnull (NN) in the Hotzenwald to a low of about 300 meters (980 ft) on the Rhine.

== Coat of arms ==
Albbruck's coat of arms depicts a blue river crossed by a bridge of red masonry, from which two fir trees grow, over a field of white. This pattern was first used in seals from the late 19th century, but was approved for official use by the Federal Ministry of the Interior on 2 November 1956. The pattern was again approved, this time by the Waldshut district office, on 13 May 1977, following the absorption of Birkingen, Buch, and Unteralpfen into Albbruck. The river on the shield is the Alb, a tributary of the High Rhine; their confluence is located in the town. The two trees are from the arms of the County of Hauenstein.

== Twin towns ==
Albbruck has been twinned with Carmignano di Brenta, Italy, since 1959.

== Transportation ==
Albbruck is connected to Germany's network of Federal highways by Bundesstraße 34. The High Rhine Railway also passes through the municipality. Traffic into Switzerland from Albbruck is made possible by the Albbruck-Dogern hydroelectric power station, in operation since 1933.
