= List of railway stations in Baden-Württemberg =

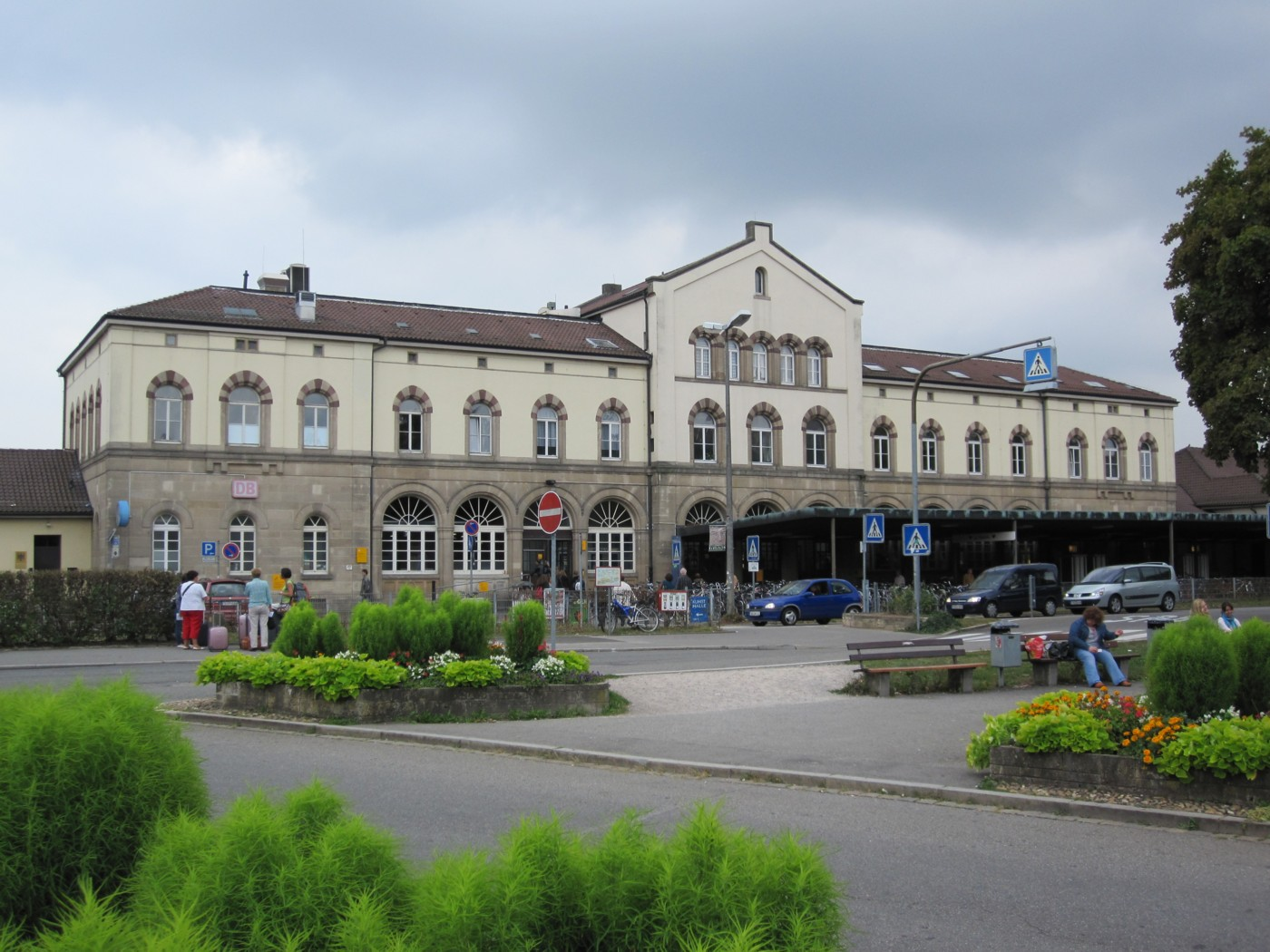
Tübingen Central Station

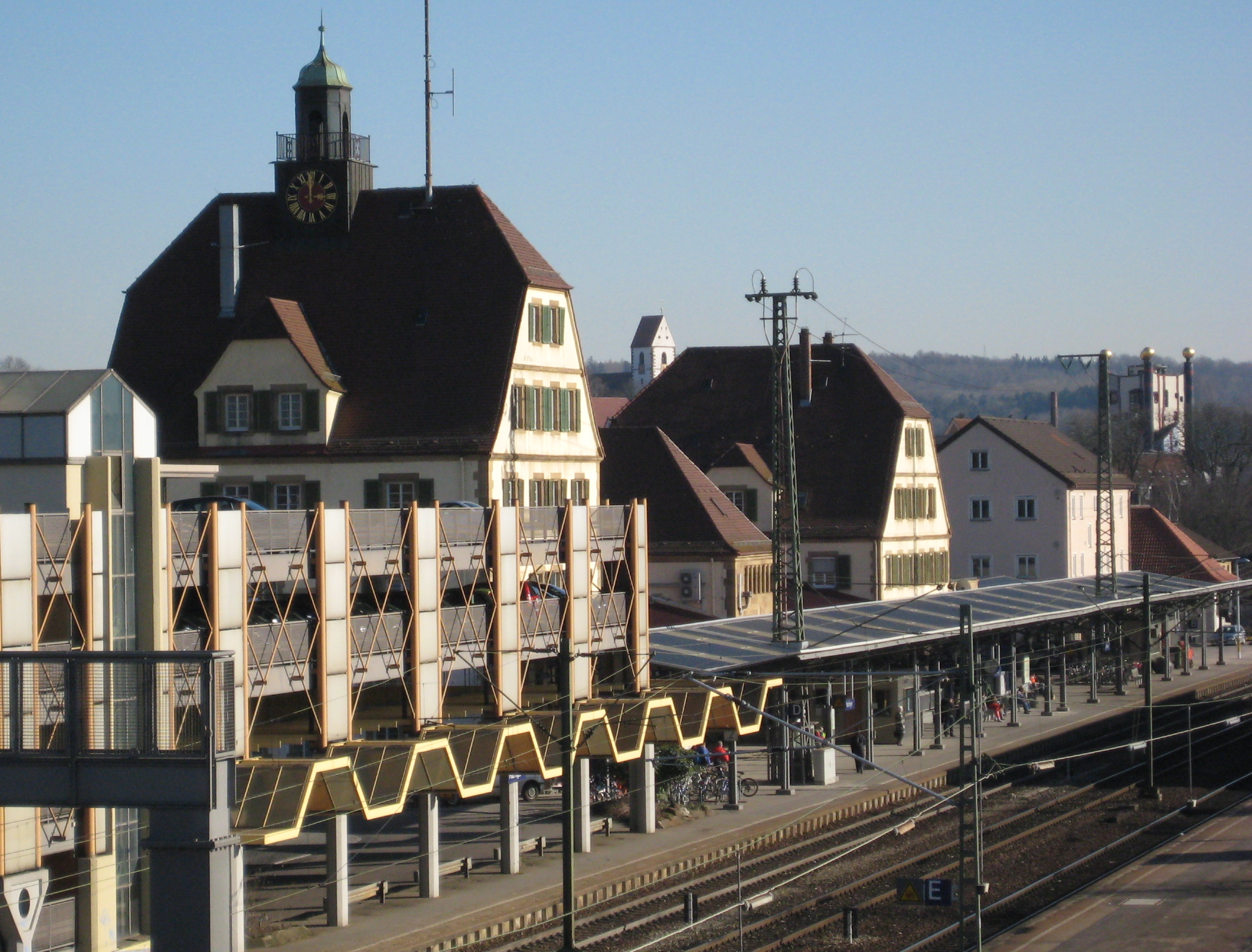
Plochingen station

The list of railway stations in Baden-Württemberg contains all stations in Baden-Württemberg that are currently served by long-distance passenger transport or regional transport.

== Legend ==
The list is set out as follows:

- Number: the stations below are all operated by Deutsche Bahn, the numbers listed are last four digits of the Internationale Bahnhofsnummer ("international station number", IBNR).
- Station: The current name of the station according to the official DB list of station abbreviations.
- Cat.: the current station category as at 1 January 2012.
- LD: station served by long-distance services (Intercity-Express, Railjet, EuroCity-Express, Eurocity, Nightjet, Flixtrain, Intercity)
- R: station served by regional services (Interregio-Express, Regional-Express, Regionalbahn, private railways)
- S: station served by S-Bahn services
- Pl.: the number of platform tracks
- Municipality: this is the municipality where the station is located.
- Type: the official classification of the station, Bahnhof (Bf, "station"), Bahnhofsteil (Bft, "station precinct") or Haltepunkt (Hp, "halt").
- Line: the line that the station is located on.

== Stations ==
Number	Station	Cat. (2012)	LD	R	S	Pl.	Municipality	Type	Line(s)
4	Aalen	2	FV	RV		5	Aalen	Bf	Aalen–Ulm; Stuttgart–Nördlingen; Goldshöfe–Crailsheim; Aalen–Dillingen (Donau)
6	Achern	4		RV	S	4	Achern	Bf	Mannheim–Basel
14	Adelsheim Nord	6			S	2	Adelsheim	Hp	Neckarelz–Osterburken
15	Adelsheim Ost	6		RV		2	Adelsheim	Hp	Würzburg–Stuttgart
18	Affaltrach	6			S	2	Obersulm	Hp	Crailsheim–Heilbronn
8168	Aglasterhausen	7			S	1	Aglasterhausen	Hp	Meckesheim–Neckarelz
21	Aha	6		RV		2	Schluchsee	Bf	Freiburg–Seebrugg
35	Aichstetten	6		RV		2	Aichstetten	Bf	Leutkirch–Memmingen
40	Albbruck	6		RV		3	Albbruck	Bf	Basel–Konstanz
47	Albstadt-Ebingen	5		RV		2	Albstadt	Bf	Tübingen–Sigmaringen
7891	Albstadt-Ebingen West	6		RV		2	Albstadt	Bf	Tübingen–Sigmaringen
49	Albstadt-Laufen Ort	7		RV		1	Albstadt	Hp	Tübingen–Sigmaringen
50	Albstadt-Lautlingen	7		RV		1	Albstadt	Hp	Tübingen–Sigmaringen
7960	Aldingen (b Spaichingen)	6		RV		2	Aldingen	Bf	Plochingen–Immendingen
60	Allensbach	5		RV		2	Allensbach	Hp	Basel–Konstanz
61	Allmendingen	6		RV		2	Allmendingen	Bf	Ulm–Sigmaringen
63	Alpirsbach	6		RV		2	Alpirsbach	Bf	Hausach–Freudenstadt
73	Altbach	3			S	4	Altbach	Bf	Stuttgart–Ulm
115	Altglashütten-Falkau	6		RV		1	Feldberg	Hp	Freiburg–Seebrugg
130	Altshausen	6		RV		2	Altshausen	Bf	Herbertingen–Aulendorf
132	Alttann	7		RV		1	Wolfegg	Hp	Aulendorf–Hergatz/Leutkirch
141	Amstetten (Württ)	5		RV		2	Amstetten	Bf	Stuttgart–Ulm; Amstetten–Gerstetten
168	Appenweier	4		RV		3	Appenweier	Bf	Mannheim–Basel; Appenweier–Bad Griesbach; Appenweier–Straßburg
196	Asperg	4			S	3	Asperg	Bf	Stuttgart–Würzburg
209	Auerbach (b Mosbach)	6			S	2	Elztal	Hp	Neckarelz–Osterburken
217	Aufhausen (Württ)	7		RV		2	Bopfingen	Hp	Stuttgart–Nördlingen
218	Auggen	5		RV		2	Auggen	Hp	Mannheim–Basel
226	Aulendorf	4	FV	RV		5	Aulendorf	Bf	Ulm–Friedrichshafen; Herbertingen–Aulendorf; Aulendorf–Hergatz/Leutkirch
239	Babstadt	6		RV		1	Babstadt	Hp	Sinsheim–Heilbronn
243	Bachheim	7		RV		1	Bachheim	Hp	Freiburg–Donaueschingen
244	Backnang	3		RV	S	5	Backnang	Bf	Waiblingen–Schwäbisch Hall-Hessental; Backnang–Ludwigsburg
247	Bad Bellingen	6		RV		2	Bad Bellingen	Hp	Mannheim–Basel
277	Bad Friedrichshall Hbf	3		RV		5	Bad Friedrichshall	Bf	Stuttgart–Würzburg; Heidelberg–Bad Friedrichshall; Neckargemünd–Bad Friedrichshall-Jagstfeld; Bad Friedrichshall–Ohrnberg
278	Bad Friedrichshall-Kochendorf	6		RV	S	2	Bad Friedrichshall	Hp	Stuttgart–Würzburg
280	Bad Griesbach	6		RV		1	Bad Peterstal-Griesbach	Hp	Appenweier–Bad Griesbach
297	Bad Krozingen	4		RV		3	Bad Krozingen	Bf	Mannheim–Basel
304	Bad Liebenzell	5		RV		2	Bad Liebenzell	Bf	Pforzheim–Horb
314	Bad Niedernau	6		RV		2	Rottenburg am Neckar	Hp	Tübingen–Horb
318	Bad Peterstal	6		RV		1	Bad Peterstal-Griesbach	Hp	Appenweier–Bad Griesbach
320	Bad Rappenau	5		RV	S	1	Bad Rappenau	Bf	Neckargemünd–Bad Friedrichshall-Jagstfeld
327	Bad Säckingen	5		RV		2	Bad Säckingen	Hp	Basel–Konstanz
5520	Bad Saulgau	6		RV		2	Bad Saulgau	Bf	Herbertingen–Aulendorf
341	Bad Schönborn Kronau	6		RV	S	2	Bad Schönborn	Hp	Mannheim–Basel
340	Bad Schönborn Süd	4			S	3	Bad Schönborn	Bf	Mannheim–Basel
342	Bad Schussenried	5		RV		3	Bad Schussenried	Bf	Ulm–Friedrichshafen
344	Bad Sebastiansweiler-Belsen	6		RV		1	Mössingen	Hp	Tübingen–Sigmaringen
355	Bad Teinach/Neubulach	6		RV		2	Bad Teinach-Zavelstein	Bf	Pforzheim–Horb
360	Bad Waldsee	6		RV		2	Bad Waldsee	Bf	Aulendorf–Hergatz/Leutkirch
364	Bad Wimpfen	6		RV	S	2	Bad Wimpfen	Bf	Neckargemünd–Bad Friedrichshall-Jagstfeld
8273	Bad Wimpfen Im Tal	6			S	1	Bad Wimpfen	Hp	Neckargemünd–Bad Friedrichshall-Jagstfeld
365	Bad Wimpfen-Hohenstadt	6			S	1	Bad Wimpfen	Hp	Neckargemünd–Bad Friedrichshall-Jagstfeld
371	Baden-Baden	3	FV	RV	S	5	Baden-Baden	Bf	Mannheim–Basel
7159	Baden-Baden Haueneberstein	6			S	2	Baden-Baden	Hp	Mannheim–Basel
6236	Baden-Baden Rebland	6			S	2	Baden-Baden	Hp	Mannheim–Basel
385	Bahlingen am Kaiserstuhl			RV		–	Bahlingen am Kaiserstuhl	Hp	Gottenheim–Breisach
385	Bahlingen-Riedlen			RV		–	Bahlingen am Kaiserstuhl	Hp	Gottenheim–Breisach
8032	Balgheim	7		RV		1	Balgheim	Hp	Lauchringen–Hintschingen
385	Balingen (Württ)	4		RV		3	Balingen	Bf	Tübingen–Sigmaringen; Balingen–Rottweil
386	Balingen Süd	6		RV		1	Balingen	Hp	Tübingen–Sigmaringen
394	Bammental	6			S	2	Bammental	Hp	Neckargemünd–Bad Friedrichshall-Jagstfeld
426	Batzenhäusle	6		RV		1	Waldkirch	Hp	Denzlingen–Elzach
468	Beimerstetten	6		RV		2	Beimerstetten	Bf	Stuttgart–Ulm
479	Bempflingen	6		RV		2	Bempflingen	Hp	Plochingen–Tübingen
484	Benningen (Neckar)	5			S	2	Benningen am Neckar	Bf	Backnang–Ludwigsburg
500	Bergenweiler	7		RV		1	Sontheim an der Brenz	Hp	Aalen–Ulm
570	Bermatingen-Ahausen	6		RV		1	Bermatingen	Hp	Stahringen–Friedrichshafen
588	Besigheim	5		RV		2	Besigheim	Bf	Würzburg–Stuttgart
602	Beuggen	6		RV		2	Rheinfelden	Hp	Basel–Konstanz
605	Beuron	7		RV		1	Beuron	Hp	Tuttlingen–Inzigkofen
606	Beutelsbach	5			S	2	Weinstadt	Hp	Stuttgart–Nördlingen
612	Biberach (Baden)	5		RV		3	Biberach	Bf	Offenburg–Singen; Biberach–Oberharmersbach
613	Biberach (Riß)	4	FV	RV		3	Biberach an der Riß	Bf	Ulm–Friedrichshafen
6918	Biberach Süd	6		RV		2	Biberach an der Riß	Bf	Ulm–Friedrichshafen
629	Bieringen (b Horb)	6		RV		2	Rottenburg am Neckar	Bf	Tübingen–Horb
635	Bietigheim (Baden)	5			S	2	Bietigheim	Hp	Mannheim–Haguenau
636	Bietigheim-Bissingen	2		RV	S	7	Bietigheim-Bissingen	Bf	Würzburg–Stuttgart; Bietigheim-Bissingen–Bruchsal
3334	Bietigheim-Ellental	5		RV	S	2	Bietigheim-Bissingen	Hp	Bietigheim-Bissingen–Bruchsal
637	Bietingen	6		RV	S	2	Gottmadingen	Hp	Basel–Singen
645	Binau	6			S	2	Binau	Hp	Heidelberg−Bad Friedrichshall-Jagstfeld
674	Bisingen	6		RV		2	Bisingen	Bf	Tübingen–Sigmaringen
679	Bittelbronn	7		RV	S	1	Horb am Neckar	Hp	Eutingen–Freudenstadt
7434	Bitzfeld	6			S	2	Bretzfeld	Hp	Crailsheim–Heilbronn
692	Blankenloch	5		RV	S	3	Stutensee	Bf	Mannheim–Haguenau
695	Blaubeuren	5		RV		2	Blaubeuren	Bf	Ulm–Sigmaringen
698	Blaustein	6		RV		2	Blaustein	Hp	Ulm–Sigmaringen
700	Bleibach	6		RV		1	Gutach im Breisgau	Hp	Bad Krozingen–Münstertal
718	Böbingen (Rems)	5		RV		3	Böbingen an der Rems	Bf	Stuttgart–Nördlingen
720	Böblingen	3		RV	S	5	Böblingen	Bf	Stuttgart–Horb; Böblingen–Renningen; Böblingen–Dettenhausen
735	Bodelshausen	6		RV		1	Bodelshausen	Hp	Tübingen–Sigmaringen
756	Böhringen-Rickelshausen	6		RV		2	Radolfzell	Hp	Basel–Konstanz
762	Bondorf (b Herrenberg)	5		RV		3	Bondorf	Bf	Stuttgart–Horb
775	Bopfingen	6		RV		2	Bopfingen	Bf	Stuttgart–Nördlingen
7994	Boxberg-Wölchingen	7		RV		1	Boxberg	Hp	Würzburg–Stuttgart
845	Breisach	6		RV		3	Breisach am Rhein	Bf	Freiburg–Breisach
875	Bretten	4		RV	S	5	Bretten	Bf	Bietigheim-Bissingen–Bruchsal; Karlsruhe–Heilbronn
8001	Bretten-Rechberg	6			S	2	Bretten	Bft	Bietigheim-Bissingen–Bruchsal
5428	Bretten-Ruit	6			S	2	Bretten	Hp	Bietigheim-Bissingen–Bruchsal
882	Bretzfeld	6			S	2	Bretzfeld	Hp	Crailsheim–Heilbronn
6839	Brigachtal Kirchdorf	6		RV		2	Brigachtal	Hp	Offenburg–Singen
6863	Brigachtal Klengen	6		RV		2	Brigachtal	Hp	Offenburg–Singen
900	Bruchhausen (b Ettlingen)	6			S	2	Ettlingen	Hp	Mannheim–Basel
904	Bruchsal	2	FV	RV	S	8	Bruchsal	Bf	Mannheim–Basel; Bietigheim-Bissingen–Bruchsal; Bruchsal–Germersheim; Bruchsal–Hilsbach
911	Brucken	7		RV		1	Lenningen	Hp	Wendlingen–Oberlenningen
939	Buchholz (Baden)	6		RV		1	Waldkirch	Hp	Denzlingen–Elzach
960	Bühl (Baden)	5		RV	S	2	Bühl	Hp	Mannheim–Basel
959	Buggingen	6		RV		2	Buggingen	Bf	Mannheim–Basel
996	Burgstall (Murr)	6		RV		2	Burgstetten	Bf	Backnang–Ludwigsburg
1025	Calw	6		RV		1	Calw	Hp	Pforzheim–Horb
1079	Crailsheim	3	FV	RV		4	Crailsheim	Bf	Crailsheim–Wertheim; Crailsheim–Heilbronn; Goldshöfe–Crailsheim; Nürnberg–Crailsheim
1115	Dallau	6			S	2	Elztal	Hp	Neckarelz–Osterburken
8060	Deißlingen Mitte	7		RV		1	Deißlingen	Hp	Rottweil–Villingen
1165	Denzlingen	4		RV		4	Denzlingen	Bf	Mannheim–Basel; Denzlingen–Elzach
1183	Dettingen (Teck)	7		RV		1	Dettingen unter Teck	Hp	Wendlingen–Oberlenningen
1234	Ditzingen	4			S	2	Ditzingen	Bf	Stuttgart–Calw
1246	Dogern	6		RV		2	Dogern	Hp	Basel–Konstanz
1247	Döggingen	6		RV		2	Bräunlingen	Bf	Freiburg–Donaueschingen
1264	Donaueschingen	4	FV	RV		5	Donaueschingen	Bf	Freiburg–Donaueschingen; Offenburg–Singen
7081	Donaueschingen Allmendshofen	7		RV		1	Donaueschingen	Hp	Freiburg–Donaueschingen
6919	Donaueschingen Aufen	7		RV		2	Donaueschingen	Hp	Offenburg–Singen
6927	Donaueschingen Grüningen	7		RV		2	Donaueschingen	Hp	Offenburg–Singen
7028	Donaueschingen Mitte/Siedlung	6		RV		2	Donaueschingen	Bft	Offenburg–Singen
1280	Dornstetten	6		RV	S	1	Dornstetten	Hp	Eutingen–Freudenstadt
1393	Durmersheim	6			S	2	Durmersheim	Bf	Mannheim–Haguenau
8004	Durmersheim Nord	6			S	2	Durmersheim	Bft	Mannheim–Haguenau
1422	Dußlingen	6		RV		2	Dußlingen	Bf	Tübingen–Sigmaringen
1432	Eberbach	3		RV	S	5	Eberbach	Bf	Heidelberg–Bad Friedrichshall-Jagstfeld; Eberbach–Hanau
1438	Ebersbach (Fils)	4		RV		3	Ebersbach an der Fils	Bf	Stuttgart–Ulm
1447	Ebringen	6		RV		2	Ebringen	Hp	Mannheim–Basel
1451	Echterdingen	4			S	2	Echterdingen	Bf	Stuttgart–Filderstadt
1456	Eckartshausen-Ilshofen	6		RV		2	Ilshofen	Hp	Heilbronn–Crailsheim
1469	Efringen-Kirchen	5		RV		3	Efringen-Kirchen	Bf	Mannheim–Basel
1483	Ehingen (Donau)	4		RV		3	Ehingen	Bf	Ulm–Sigmaringen
1486	Ehningen (b Böblingen)	4			S	2	Ehningen	Hp	Stuttgart–Horb
1502	Eicholzheim	6			S	2	Schefflenz	Hp	Neckarelz–Osterburken
1519	Eimeldingen	6		RV		2	Eimeldingen	Hp	Mannheim–Basel
1539	Eislingen (Fils)	4		RV		3	Eislingen/Fils	Bf	Stuttgart–Ulm
1550	Ellhofen	6			S	2	Ellhofen	Hp	Crailsheim-Heilbronn
1554	Ellwangen	5		RV		3	Ellwangen	Bf	Goldshöfe–Crailsheim
1576	Elzach	6		RV		1	Elzach	Hp	Freiburg–Elzach
1584	Emmendingen	4		RV		3	Emmendingen	Bf	Mannheim–Basel
1592	Endersbach	4			S	3	Endersbach	Bf	Stuttgart–Nördlingen
1598	Engen	4		RV		3	Engen	Bf	Offenburg–Singen; Plochingen–Immendingen
1601	Engstlatt	7		RV		1	Balingen	Hp	Tübingen–Sigmaringen
1608	Enzberg	6		RV	S	2	Enzberg	Hp	Karlsruhe–Mühlacker
	Eppingen				S	4	Eppingen	Bf	Karlsruhe–Heilbronn; Steinsfurt–Eppingen
1621	Erbach (Württ)	5		RV		3	Erbach	Bf	Ulm–Friedrichshafen
1628	Erdmannhausen-Rielingshausen	7		RV		1	Erdmannhausen	Hp	Backnang–Ludwigsburg
1639	Ergenzingen	6		RV		2	Rottenburg am Neckar	Hp	Stuttgart–Horb
1642	Eriskirch	6		RV		2	Eriskirch	Bf	Friedrichshafen–Lindau
1669	Erzingen (Baden)	4		RV		3	Klettgau	Bf	Basel–Konstanz
8163	Eschelbronn	7			S	1	Eschelbronn	Hp	Meckesheim–Neckarelz
1674	Eschenau (b Heilbronn)	6			S	2	Obersulm	Bf	Crailsheim-Heilbronn
1716	Esslingen (Neckar)	3		RV	S	6	Esslingen	Bf	Stuttgart–Ulm
1717	Esslingen-Mettingen	3			S	4	Esslingen	Bf	Stuttgart–Ulm
1718	Esslingen-Zell	4			S	4	Esslingen	Bf	Stuttgart–Ulm
1725	Ettlingen West	5			S	3	Esslingen	Bf	Mannheim–Basel; Karlsruhe–Bad Herrenalb
1730	Eubigheim	7		RV		2	Ahorn	Bf	Stuttgart–Würzburg
1737	Eutingen (Baden)	5		RV	S	2	Pforzheim	Hp	Karlsruhe–Mühlacker
1738	Eutingen im Gäu	4		RV	S	3	Eutingen im Gäu	Bf	Stuttgart–Horb; Eutingen–Freudenstadt
1742	Eyach	6		RV		2	Eutingen im Gäu	Bf	Tübingen–Horb
1749	Fahrnau	6		RV		1	Schopfheim	Hp	Basel Bad–Zell
1767	Faurndau	5		RV		2	Göppingen	Hp	Stuttgart–Ulm
1768	Favoritepark	5			S	2	Stuttgart	Hp	Backnang–Ludwigsburg
1772	Feldberg-Bärental	6		RV		2	Feldberg	Bf	Freiburg–Seebrugg
1775	Fellbach	3			S	3	Fellbach	Bf	Stuttgart–Nördlingen
1788	Fichtenberg	6		RV		2	Fichtenberg	Bf	Waiblingen–Schwäbisch Hall-Hessental
3022	Filderstadt	5			S	2	Filderstadt	Bf	Stuttgart-Filderstadt
1829	Forchheim (b Karlsruhe)	6			S	2	Rheinstetten	Bf	Mannheim–Haguenau
1833	Fornsbach	6		RV		2	Murrhardt	Hp	Waiblingen–Schwäbisch Hall-Hessental
1890	Freiberg (Neckar)	5			S	2	Freiberg am Neckar	Bf	Backnang–Ludwigsburg
1893	Freiburg (Breisgau) Hbf	2	FV	RV		8	Freiburg im Breisgau	Bf	Mannheim–Basel; Freiburg–Donaueschingen; Freiburg–Breisach
7992	Freiburg Messe/Universität	6		RV		1	Freiburg im Breisgau	Hp	Freiburg–Breisach
1895	Freiburg West	6		RV		1	Freiburg im Breisgau	Hp	Freiburg–Breisach
1896	Freiburg-Herdern	5		RV		2	Freiburg im Breisgau	Hp	Mannheim–Basel
1894	Freiburg-Klinikum	6		RV		1	Freiburg im Breisgau	Hp	Freiburg–Breisach
1897	Freiburg-Littenweiler	6		RV		1	Freiburg im Breisgau	Hp	Freiburg–Donaueschingen
1898	Freiburg-St Georgen	6		RV		2	Freiburg im Breisgau	Hp	Mannheim–Basel
1899	Freiburg-Wiehre	5		RV		2	Freiburg im Breisgau	Bf	Freiburg–Donaueschingen
1900	Freiburg-Zähringen	6		RV		2	Freiburg im Breisgau	Hp	Mannheim–Basel
1921	Freudenstadt Hbf	5		RV	S	3	Freudenstadt	Bf	Rastatt–Freudenstadt; Hausach–Freudenstadt; Eutingen–Freudenstadt
1927	Fridingen (b Tuttlingen)	6		RV		2	Fridingen an der Donau	Bf	Tuttlingen–Inzigkofen
5987	Friedrichshafen Flughafen	5		RV		2	Friedrichshafen	Hp	Ulm–Friedrichshafen
1945	Friedrichshafen Hafen	5		RV		2	Friedrichshafen	Bft	Friedrichshafen Stadt–Friedrichshafen Hafen
2718	Friedrichshafen Landratsamt	7		RV		1	Friedrichshafen	Hp	Stahringen–Friedrichshafen
6456	Friedrichshafen Manzell	6		RV		2	Friedrichshafen	Bf	Stahringen–Friedrichshafen
1946	Friedrichshafen Ost	6		RV		1	Friedrichshafen	Hp	Friedrichshafen–Lindau
1947	Friedrichshafen Stadt	3	FV	RV		5	Friedrichshafen	Bf	Ulm–Friedrichshafen; Stahringen–Friedrichshafen; Friedrichshafen–Lindau
7435	Friedrichshafen-Fischbach	7		RV		1	Friedrichshafen	Hp	Stahringen–Friedrichshafen
7430	Friedrichshafen-Kluftern	7		RV		1	Friedrichshafen	Hp	Stahringen–Friedrichshafen
1954	Friedrichstal (Baden)	5		RV	S	2	Baiersbronn	Hp	Mannheim–Haguenau
1962	Friesenheim (Baden)	6		RV		2	Friesenheim	Bf	Mannheim–Basel
1968	Frommern	6		RV		1	Balingen	Hp	Tübingen–Sigmaringen
1998	Gaildorf West	6		RV		3	Gaildorf	Bf	Waiblingen–Schwäbisch Hall-Hessental
2016	Gärtringen	5			S	2	Gärtringen	Bf	Stuttgart–Horb
2021	Gaubüttelbrunn	6		RV		2	Wittighausen	Hp	Stuttgart–Würzburg
2023	Gäufelden	5		RV		2	Gäufelden	Hp	Stuttgart–Horb
2044	Geisingen	6		RV		2	Geisingen	Hp	Offenburg–Singen
2045	Geislingen (Steige)	4	FV	RV		3	Geislingen an der Steige	Bf	Stuttgart–Ulm
2046	Geislingen West	6		RV		2	Geislingen an der Steige	Bf	Stuttgart–Ulm
2062	Gengenbach	4		RV		3	Gengenbach	Bf	Offenburg–Singen
2083	Geradstetten	5			S	2	Remshalden	Hp	Stuttgart–Nördlingen
2085	Gerhausen	6		RV		1	Blaubeuren	Hp	Ulm–Sigmaringen
2088	Gerlachsheim	6		RV		2	Lauda-Königshofen	Hp	Stuttgart–Würzburg
2118	Giengen (Brenz)	5		RV		2	Giengen an der Brenz	Bf	Aalen–Ulm
2126	Gingen (Fils)	6		RV		2	Gingen an der Fils	Hp	Stuttgart–Ulm
2171	Goldberg	5			S	2	Sindelfingen	Hp	Stuttgart–Horb
2175	Goldshöfe	5		RV		4	Aalen	Bf	Stuttgart–Nördlingen; Goldshöfe–Crailsheim
2189	Göppingen	3	FV	RV		8	Göppingen	Bf	Stuttgart–Ulm
2214	Gottenheim	5		RV		3	Gottenheim	Bf	Freiburg–Breisach
2219	Gottmadingen	5		RV	S	2	Gottmadingen	Bf	Basel–Singen
2223	Graben-Neudorf	4		RV		5	Graben-Neudorf	Bf	Mannheim–Haguenau; Bruchsal–Germersheim
2224	Graben-Neudorf Nord	6		RV		1	Graben-Neudorf	Hp	Bruchsal–Germersheim
2257	Grenzach	5		RV		3	Grenzach-Wyhlen	Bf	Basel–Konstanz
2272	Grießen (Baden)	7		RV		1	Klettgau	Hp	Basel–Konstanz
2286	Grombach	6		RV	S	2	Bad Rappenau	Bf	Neckargemünd–Bad Friedrichshall-Jagstfeld
2387	Grunbach	5			S	3	Remshalden	Bf	Stuttgart–Nördlingen
2401	Grünsfeld	6		RV		2	Grünsfeld	Hp	Stuttgart–Würzburg
2412	Gundelfingen	5		RV		2	Gundelfingen	Hp	Mannheim–Basel
2416	Gundelsheim (Neckar)	6		RV		2	Gundelsheim	Bf	Heidelberg–Bad Friedrichshall-Jagstfeld
2433	Gutach (Breisgau)	6		RV		1	Gutach im Breisgau	Hp	Denzlingen–Elzach
2492	Halbmeil	7		RV		1	Wolfach	Hp	Hausach–Freudenstadt
2511	Haltingen	6		RV		2	Weil am Rhein	Bf	Mannheim–Basel
2577	Haslach	5		RV		3	Haslach im Kinzigtal	Bf	Offenburg–Singen
2586	Haßmersheim	6		RV		2	Haßmersheim	Hp	Heidelberg–Bad Friedrichshall-Jagstfeld
2601	Hausach	4	FV	RV		3	Hausach	Bf	Offenburg–Singen; Hausach–Freudenstadt
2605	Hausen im Tal	7		RV		1	Beuron	Hp	Tuttlingen–Inzigkofen
2606	Hausen-Raitbach	6		RV		1	Beuron	Hp	Basel Bad–Zell
8050	HD-Weststadt/Südstadt	5			S	2	Heidelberg	Bft	Heidelberg–Bad Friedrichshall-Jagstfeld
2614	Hechingen	6		RV		1	Hechingen	Bf	Tübingen–Sigmaringen
2362	Heddesheim/Hirschberg	5		RV		3	Heddesheim	Bf	Frankfurt–Heidelberg
2624	Hegne	6		RV		2	Allensbach	Hp	Basel–Konstanz
2628	Heidelberg Hbf	2	FV	RV	S	9	Heidelberg	Bf	Mannheim–Basel; Frankfurt–Heidelberg; Heidelberg–Bad Friedrichshall-Jagstfeld
2629	Heidelberg-Altstadt	4			S	2	Heidelberg	Bf	Heidelberg–Bad Friedrichshall-Jagstfeld
2630	Heidelberg-Kirchheim/Rohrbach	4			S	3	Heidelberg	Bf	Mannheim–Basel
8051	Heidelberg-Orthopädie	6			S	2	Heidelberg	Hp	Heidelberg–Bad Friedrichshall-Jagstfeld
2631	Heidelberg-Pfaffengrund/Wieblingen	4		RV	S	2	Heidelberg	Hp	Mannheim–Basel; Frankfurt–Heidelberg
5596	Heidelberg-Schlierbach-Ziegelhausen	6			S	2	Heidelberg	Hp	Heidelberg–Bad Friedrichshall-Jagstfeld
2639	Heidenheim	4		RV		3	Heidenheim	Bf	Aalen–Ulm
2640	Heidenheim Voithwerk	7		RV		1	Heidenheim	Hp	Aalen–Ulm
2642	Heidenheim-Schnaitheim	6		RV		2	Heidenheim	Bf	Stuttgart–Nördlingen
2648	Heilbronn Hbf	2		RV	S	9	Heilbronn	Bf	Stuttgart–Würzburg; Crailsheim-Heilbronn; Karlsruhe–Heilbronn
2650	Heilbronn Sülmertor	6		RV		2	Heilbronn	Hp	Stuttgart–Würzburg
7623	Heilbronn Trappensee	6			S	2	Heilbronn	Hp	Crailsheim-Heilbronn
2669	Heitersheim	5		RV		2	Heitersheim	Bf	Mannheim–Basel
8167	Helmstadt (Baden)	7			S	1	Helmstadt-Bargen	Hp	Meckesheim–Neckarelz
2684	Hemsbach	5		RV		3	Hemsbach	Bf	Frankfurt–Heidelberg
2695	Herbertingen	5		RV		4	Herbertingen	Bf	Ulm–Sigmaringen; Herbertingen–Aulendorf
2696	Herbertingen Ort	7		RV		1	Herbertingen	Hp	Herbertingen–Aulendorf
2699	Herbolzheim (Breisgau)	5		RV		2	Herbolzheim	Bf	Mannheim–Basel
2700	Herbolzheim (Jagst)	6		SEV		2	Neudenau	Hp	Stuttgart–Würzburg
2703	Herbrechtingen	6		RV		2	Herbrechtingen	Bf	Aalen–Ulm
2717	Hermaringen	6		RV		2	Hermaringen	Bf	Aalen–Ulm
2726	Herrenberg	3		RV	S	6	Herrenberg	Bf	Stuttgart–Horb; Herrenberg–Tübingen
2728	Herrlingen	6		RV		3	Blaustein	Bf	Ulm–Sigmaringen
2735	Herten (Baden)	6		RV		2	Rheinfelden	Hp	Basel–Konstanz
2774	Himmelreich	5		RV		2	Buchenbach	Bf	Freiburg–Donaueschingen
2782	Hinterzarten	5		RV		2	Hinterzarten	Bf	Freiburg–Donaueschingen
2783	Hirsau	7		RV		1	Calw	Hp	Pforzheim–Horb
2800	Hochdorf (b Horb)	6		RV	S	2	Eutingen im Gäu	Bf	Eutingen–Freudenstadt; Pforzheim–Horb
2814	Hockenheim	4		RV		3	Hockenheim	Bf	Mannheim–Haguenau
2821	Hofen (b Aalen)	6		RV		2	Aalen	Hp	Stuttgart–Nördlingen; Goldshöfe–Crailsheim
2823	Hoffenheim	6		RV	S	2	Sinsheim	Bf	Neckargemünd–Bad Friedrichshall-Jagstfeld
2829	Höfingen	5			S	2	Leonberg	Hp	Stuttgart-Zuffenhausen–Weil der Stadt
2906	Horb	3	FV	RV		6	Horb	Bf	Stuttgart–Horb; Plochingen–Immendingen; Pforzheim–Horb
2913	Hornberg	5		RV		3	Hornberg	Bf	Offenburg–Singen
2934	Hubacker	7		RV		1	Lautenbach	Hp	Appenweier–Bad Griesbach
8059	Hüfingen Mitte	6		RV		1	Hüfingen	Hp	Freiburg–Donaueschingen; Hüfingen Mitte–Bräunlingen
2942	Hugstetten	6		RV		1	March	Hp	Freiburg–Breisach
2943	Hulb	5			S	2	Böblingen	Hp	Stuttgart–Horb
2955	Huttenheim	6		RV		1	Philippsburg	Hp	Bruchsal–Germersheim
2960	Ibach	7		RV		1	Oppenau	Hp	Appenweier–Bad Griesbach
2969	Ihringen	6		RV		1	Ihringen	Hp	Freiburg–Breisach
2975	Illingen (Württ)	5		RV	S	2	Illingen	Bf	Bietigheim-Bissingen–Bruchsal
2982	Immendingen	4		RV		5	Immendingen	Bf	Offenburg–Singen; Ulm–Sigmaringen
8033	Immendingen Mitte	7		RV		1	Immendingen	Hp	Ulm–Sigmaringen
8034	Immendingen Zimmern	7		RV		1	Immendingen	Hp	Offenburg–Singen
3013	Istein	6		RV		2	Efringen-Kirchen	Hp	Mannheim–Basel
3015	Ittlingen	6			S	1	Ittlingen	Hp	Steinsfurt–Eppingen
8008	Itzelberg	7		RV		1	Königsbronn	Hp	Aalen–Ulm
3026	Jagstzell	6		RV		2	Jagstzell	Bf	Goldshöfe–Crailsheim
3105	Karlsdorf	6		RV		2	Karlsdorf-Neuthard	Hp	Bruchsal–Germersheim
3107	Karlsruhe Hbf	1	FV	RV	S	16	Karlsruhe	Bf	Mannheim–Basel; Karlsruhe–Mühlacker; Karlsruhe–Neustadt; Mannheim–Haguenau
3108	Karlsruhe West	6		RV	S	2	Karlsruhe	Bf	Karlsruhe–Neustadt
3109	Karlsruhe-Durlach	3		RV	S	5	Karlsruhe	Bf	Mannheim–Basel; Karlsruhe–Mühlacker
3110	Karlsruhe-Hagsfeld	5		RV	S	2	Karlsruhe	Bf	Mannheim–Haguenau
3111	Karlsruhe-Knielingen	6		RV	S	2	Karlsruhe	Bf	Karlsruhe–Neustadt
3112	Karlsruhe-Mühlburg	6		RV	S	2	Karlsruhe	Hp	Karlsruhe–Neustadt
3148	Kehl	4	FV	RV	S	4	Kehl	Bf	Appenweier–Straßburg
3149	Kehlen	7		RV		2	Meckenbeuren	Hp	Ulm–Friedrichshafen
3160	Kenzingen	5		RV		2	Kenzingen	Bf	Mannheim–Basel
3170	Kiebingen	6		RV		1	Rottenburg am Neckar	Hp	Tübingen–Horb
3183	Kirchberg (Murr)	6		RV		2	Kirchberg an der Murr	Bf	Backnang–Ludwigsburg
3190	Kirchentellinsfurt	5		RV		2	Kirchentellinsfurt	Hp	Plochingen–Tübingen
3193	Kirchheim (Neckar)	5		RV		2	Kirchheim am Neckar	Hp	Stuttgart–Würzburg
3194	Kirchheim (Teck)	5		RV	S	3	Kirchheim an der Teck	Bf	Wendlingen–Oberlenningen
3195	Kirchheim (Teck) Süd	6		RV		1	Kirchheim an der Teck	Hp	Wendlingen–Oberlenningen
3196	Kirchheim (Teck)-Ötlingen	5		RV	S	2	Kirchheim an der Teck	Bf	Wendlingen–Oberlenningen
3206	Kirchzarten	5		RV		2	Kirchzarten	Bf	Freiburg–Donaueschingen
3211	Kißlegg	5		RV		3	Kißlegg	Bf	Aulendorf–Hergatz/Leutkirch
3252	Kleinkems	6		RV		2	Efringen-Kirchen	Hp	Mannheim–Basel
6370	Knittlingen-Kleinvillars	6			S	2	Knittlingen	Hp	Bietigheim-Bissingen–Bruchsal
3316	Kollmarsreute	6		RV		1	Emmendingen	Hp	Mannheim–Basel
3317	Kollnau	6		RV		1	Waldkirch	Hp	Denzlingen–Elzach
3342	Köndringen	6		RV		2	Teningen	Hp	Mannheim–Basel
3347	Königsbronn	6		RV		2	Königsbronn	Bf	Aalen–Ulm
3352	Königshofen (Baden)	6		RV		1	Lauda-Königshofen	Hp	Stuttgart–Würzburg; Wertheim–Crailsheim
3363	Konstanz	3	FV	RV		4	Konstanz	Bf	Basel–Konstanz; Etzwilen–Konstanz
8047	Konstanz Fürstenberg	6		RV		2	Konstanz	Hp	Basel–Konstanz
3364	Konstanz-Petershausen	5		RV		2	Konstanz	Bf	Basel–Konstanz
3365	Konstanz-Wollmatingen	5		RV		2	Konstanz	Hp	Basel–Konstanz
3374	Kork	6		RV		2	Kehl	Bf	Appenweier–Straßburg
3377	Korntal	4		RV	S	4	Korntal-Münchingen	Bf	Stuttgart–Calw; Korntal–Weissach
3379	Kornwestheim Pbf	3		RV	S	7	Kornwestheim	Bf	Stuttgart–Würzburg; Backnang–Ludwigsburg; Stuttgart-Untertürkheim–Kornwestheim
3412	Kressbronn	5		RV		2	Kressbronn am Bodensee	Bf	Friedrichshafen–Lindau
3445	Kuchen	6		RV		2	Kuchen	Hp	Stuttgart–Ulm
3490	Ladenburg	5		RV		2	Ladenburg	Bf	Mannheim–Basel
3494	Lahr (Schwarzw)	4		RV		4	Lahr/Schwarzwald	Bf	Mannheim–Basel
3525	Langenargen	6		RV		2	Langenargen	Bf	Friedrichshafen–Lindau
3527	Langenau (Württ)	5		RV		2	Langenau	Bf	Aalen–Ulm
3574	Lauchheim	6		RV		2	Lauchheim	Bf	Stuttgart–Nördlingen
3575	Lauchringen	6		RV		1	Lauchringen	Hp	Basel–Konstanz
8048	Lauchringen West	6		RV		1	Lauchringen	Hp	Basel–Konstanz
3576	Lauda	4		RV		4	Lauda-Königshofen	Bf	Stuttgart–Würzburg; Wertheim–Crailsheim
3578	Laudenbach (Bergstr)	5		RV		2	Laudenbach	Bf	Frankfurt–Heidelberg
3589	Laufenburg (Baden)	6		RV		2	Laufenburg	Hp	Basel–Konstanz
3590	Laufenburg (Baden) Ost	6		RV		2	Laufenburg	Hp	Basel–Konstanz
3591	Lauffen (Neckar)	4		RV		3	Lauffen am Neckar	Bf	Stuttgart–Würzburg
7892	Laupheim Stadt	6		RV		2	Laupheim	Bf	Laupheim West–Schwendi
3593	Laupheim West	5		RV		4	Laupheim	Bf	Ulm–Friedrichshafen; Laupheim West–Schwendi
3600	Lautenbach (Baden)	7		RV		1	Lautenbach	Hp	Appenweier–Bad Griesbach
3613	Legelshurst	6		RV		2	Willstätt	Hp	Appenweier–Straßburg
3626	Leinfelden	4			S	2	Leinfelden-Echterdingen	Hp	Stuttgart-Filderstadt
3667	Leonberg	4			S	3	Leonberg	Bf	Stuttgart–Calw
3689	Leutkirch	5		RV		3	Leutkirch	Bf	Aulendorf–Hergatz/Leutkirch; Leutkirch–Memmingen
3725	Lindach	6			S	2	Nordrach	Hp	Heidelberg–Bad Friedrichshall-Jagstfeld
3756	Löcherberg	7		RV		1	Oppenau	Hp	Appenweier–Bad Griesbach
3762	Löffingen	6		RV		2	Löffingen	Bf	Freiburg–Donaueschingen
3778	Lonsee	6		RV		2	Lonsee	Hp	Stuttgart–Ulm
3781	Lorch (Württ)	5		RV		2	Lorch	Bf	Stuttgart–Nördlingen
8043	Lörrach Dammstraße	7			S	1	Lörrach	Hp	Weil am Rhein–Lörrach
3783	Lörrach	4			S	3	Lörrach	Bf	Basel Bad–Zell
8044	Lörrach Museum/Burghof	6			S	2	Lörrach	Bft	Basel Bad–Zell
8045	Lörrach Schwarzwaldstraße	5			S	2	Lörrach	Bft	Basel Bad–Zell
896	Lörrach-Brombach/Hauingen	6			S	1	Lörrach	Hp	Basel Bad–Zell
2441	Lörrach-Haagen/Messe	6			S	2	Lörrach	Bft	Basel Bad–Zell
3784	Lörrach-Stetten	6			S	1	Lörrach	Bft	Basel Bad–Zell; Weil am Rhein–Lörrach
3790	Loßburg-Rodt	7		RV		1	Lörrach	Hp	Hausach–Freudenstadt
3798	Löwental	6		RV		2	Friedrichshafen	Hp	Ulm–Friedrichshafen
3833	Ludwigsburg	3		RV	S	5	Ludwigsburg	Bf	Stuttgart–Würzburg; Backnang–Ludwigsburg
3836	Ludwigshafen (Bodensee)	6		RV		2	Ludwigshafen am Bodensee	Bf	Stahringen–Friedrichshafen
3873	Lützelsachsen	6		RV		2	Weinheim	Hp	Frankfurt–Heidelberg
8110	Maichingen	6			S	–	Sindelfingen	Hp	Böblingen–Renningen
3916	Malmsheim	5			S	2	Renningen	Hp	Stuttgart–Calw
3917	Malsch	6		RV	S	2	Malsch	Hp	Mannheim–Basel
8155	Mannheim ARENA / Maimarkt	4		RV	S	3	Mannheim	Bf	Mannheim–Basel
3925	Mannheim Hbf	2	FV	RV	S	10	Mannheim	Bf	Mannheim–Stuttgart; Mannheim–Basel; Mannheim–Saarbrücken; Mannheim–Frankfurt; Mannheim–Haguenau
3927	Mannheim-Friedrichsfeld	3		RV		5	Mannheim	Bf	Frankfurt–Heidelberg
3928	Mannheim-Friedrichsfeld Süd	4			S	2	Mannheim	Hp	Mannheim–Basel; Frankfurt–Heidelberg
3929	Mannheim-Handelshafen	6		RV		2	Mannheim	Hp	Mannheim–Frankfurt
3931	Mannheim-Luzenberg	5		RV		3	Mannheim	Bf	Mannheim–Frankfurt
3932	Mannheim-Neckarau	4		RV		3	Mannheim	Bf	Mannheim–Rastatt
3933	Mannheim-Neckarstadt	6		RV		2	Mannheim	Hp	Mannheim–Frankfurt
3934	Mannheim-Rheinau	5		RV		3	Mannheim	Bf	Mannheim–Haguenau
3935	Mannheim-Seckenheim	4		RV	S	2	Mannheim	Hp	Mannheim–Basel; Frankfurt–Heidelberg
3936	Mannheim-Waldhof	4		RV		5	Mannheim	Bf	Mannheim–Frankfurt
3941	Marbach (Neckar)	4			S	3	Marbach am Neckar	Bf	Backnang–Ludwigsburg
7148	Marbach Ost Villingen-Schwenningen	7		RV		1	Villingen-Schwenningen	Hp	Rottweil–Villingen
7147	Marbach West Villingen-Schwenningen	7		RV		2	Villingen-Schwenningen	Hp	Offenburg–Singen
3955	Markdorf (Baden)	5		RV		2	Markdorf	Bf	Stahringen–Friedrichshafen
3957	Markelfingen	6			S	2	Radolfzell am Bodensee	Hp	Basel–Konstanz
3988	Marstetten-Aitrach	6		RV		1	Aitrach	Hp	Leutkirch–Memmingen
4001	Maubach	5			S	2	Backnang	Hp	Waiblingen–Schwäbisch Hall-Hessental
4002	Mauer (b Heidelberg)	6			S	2	Mauer	Hp	Neckargemünd–Bad Friedrichshall-Jagstfeld
4003	Maulbronn West	6			S	2	Maulbronn	Bf	Bietigheim-Bissingen–Bruchsal
4004	Maulburg	6			S	1	Maulburg	Hp	Basel Bad–Zell
4015	Meckenbeuren	4		RV		2	Meckenbeuren	Hp	Ulm–Friedrichshafen
4017	Meckesheim	4		RV	S	3	Meckesheim	Bf	Neckargemünd–Bad Friedrichshall-Jagstfeld
4055	Mengen	5		RV		2	Mengen	Bf	Ulm–Sigmaringen
4087	Metzingen	4		RV		3	Metzingen	Bf	Plochingen–Tübingen; Metzingen–Bad Urach
4143	Mochenwangen	7		RV		2	Wolpertswende	Bf	Ulm–Friedrichshafen
4145	Möckmühl	5		RV		3	Möckmühl	Bf	Stuttgart–Würzburg
4150	Mögglingen (b Gmünd)	6		RV		2	Mögglingen	Hp	Stuttgart–Nördlingen
8035	Möhringen Bahnhof	7		RV		1	Möhringen an der Donau	Hp	Ulm–Sigmaringen
8036	Möhringen Rathaus	7		RV		1	Möhringen an der Donau	Hp	Ulm–Sigmaringen
7763	Monbach-Neuhausen	7		RV		1	Neuhausen	Hp	Pforzheim–Horb
4183	Mosbach (Baden)	6		RV	S	2	Mosbach	Bf	Neckarelz–Osterburken
8052	Mosbach West	6		RV	S	2	Mosbach	Hp	Neckarelz–Osterburken
4316	Mosbach-Neckarelz	4		RV	S	4	Mosbach	Bf	Heidelberg–Bad Friedrichshall-Jagstfeld; Neckarelz–Osterburken
4189	Mössingen	5		RV		2	Mössingen	Bf	Tübingen–Sigmaringen
4197	Mühlacker	4	FV	RV	S	6	Mühlacker	Bf	Bietigheim-Bissingen–Bruchsal; Karlsruhe–Mühlacker
6237	Mühlacker Rößlesweg	5		RV	S	2	Mühlacker	Bft	Bietigheim-Bissingen–Bruchsal
4202	Mühlen (b Horb)	7		RV		1	Horb	Hp	Tübingen–Horb
4206	Mühlhausen (b Engen)	6		RV		2	Mühlhausen-Ehingen	Hp	Offenburg–Singen; Plochingen–Immendingen
4209	Mühlheim (b Tuttlingen)	6		RV		1	Mühlheim an der Donau	Hp	Tuttlingen–Inzigkofen
4223	Müllheim (Baden)	4		RV		5	Müllheim	Bf	Mannheim–Basel; Müllheim–Mulhouse
4196	Muggensturm	6		RV	S	2	Muggensturm	Bf	Mannheim–Basel
4275	Munderkingen	6		RV		2	Munderkingen	Bf	Ulm–Sigmaringen
4282	Murg (Baden)	6		RV		2	Murg	Hp	Basel–Konstanz
4287	Murrhardt	5		RV		3	Murrhardt	Bf	Waiblingen–Schwäbisch Hall-Hessental
4295	Nagold	6		RV		2	Nagold	Bf	Pforzheim–Horb
8027	Nagold Stadtmitte	7		RV		1	Nagold	Hp	Pforzheim–Horb
8157	Nagold-Steinberg	7		RV		1	Nagold	Hp	Pforzheim–Horb
8166	Neckarbischofsheim Nord	7		RV	S	1	Waibstadt	Bft	Meckesheim–Neckarelz; Neckarbischofsheim Nord–Hüffenhardt
4315	Neckarburken	6		RV	S	2	Elztal	Hp	Neckarelz–Osterburken
4317	Neckargemünd	3		RV	S	4	Neckargemünd	Bf	Heidelberg–Bad Friedrichshall-Jagstfeld; Neckargemünd–Bad Friedrichshall-Jagstfeld
8053	Neckargemünd Altstadt	5			S	2	Neckargemünd	Hp	Heidelberg–Bad Friedrichshall-Jagstfeld
4318	Neckargerach	6			S	2	Neckargerach	Hp	Heidelberg–Bad Friedrichshall-Jagstfeld
4322	Neckarsulm	4		RV	S	3	Neckarsulm	Bf	Stuttgart–Würzburg
4323	Neckarzimmern	6		RV		2	Neckarzimmern	Bf	Heidelberg–Bad Friedrichshall-Jagstfeld
4330	Nehren	6		RV		1	Nehren	Hp	Tübingen–Sigmaringen
8164	Neidenstein	7			S	1	Neidenstein	Hp	Meckesheim–Neckarelz
4334	Nellmersbach	5			S	2	Leutenbach	Hp	Waiblingen–Schwäbisch Hall-Hessental
4336	Nendingen (b Tuttlingen)	7		RV		1	Tuttlingen	Hp	Tuttlingen–Inzigkofen
4370	Neudenau	6		RV		2	Neudenau	Hp	Stuttgart–Würzburg
7156	Neuenburg (Baden)	6		RV		1	Neuenburg am Rhein	Hp	Müllheim–Mulhouse
4387	Neuenstein	6		RV		2	Neuenstein	Hp	Crailsheim-Heilbronn
4414	Neulußheim	5		RV		2	Neulußheim	Hp	Mannheim–Haguenau
4451	Neustadt (Schwarzw)	5		RV		3	Titisee-Neustadt	Bf	Freiburg–Donaueschingen
4458	Neustadt-Hohenacker	5			S	2	Titisee-Neustadt	Bf	Waiblingen–Schwäbisch Hall-Hessental
4467	Neuwirtshaus-Porscheplatz	5			S	2	Stuttgart	Hp	Stuttgart–Würzburg; Stuttgart–Calw
4483	Niederbiegen	6		RV		2	Baienfurt	Bf	Ulm–Friedrichshafen
4531	Niederstotzingen	6		RV		2	Niederstotzingen	Bf	Aalen–Ulm
4541	Niederwinden	6		RV		1	Winden im Elztal	Hp	Denzlingen–Elzach
4544	Niefern	5		RV	S	2	Niefern-Öschelbronn	Hp	
4578	Nordheim (Württ)	6		RV		2	Nordheim	Hp	Stuttgart–Würzburg
4585	Norsingen	6		RV		2	Ehrenkirchen	Hp	Mannheim–Basel
4612	Nürtingen	3		RV		3	Nürtingen	Bf	Plochingen–Tübingen
4592	Nufringen	5			S	2	Nufringen	Hp	Stuttgart–Horb
4617	Oberaichen	5			S	2	Leinfelden-Echterdingen	Hp	Stuttgart-Filderstadt
4626	Oberboihingen	6		RV		2	Oberboihingen	Hp	Plochingen–Tübingen
4638	Oberesslingen	4			S	4	Esslingen	Bf	Stuttgart–Ulm
4654	Oberkirch	5		RV		3	Oberkirch	Bf	Appenweier–Bad Griesbach
4655	Oberkirch-Koehlersiedlung	7		RV		1	Oberkirch	Hp	Appenweier–Bad Griesbach
4657	Oberkochen	6		RV		2	Oberkochen	Bf	Aalen–Ulm
4661	Oberlenningen	6		RV		1	Lenningen	Hp	Wendlingen–Oberlenningen
4670	Oberndorf (Neckar)	5		RV		3	Oberndorf am Neckar	Bf	Plochingen–Immendingen
4687	Oberschefflenz	6		RV	S	2	Schefflenz	Hp	Neckarelz–Osterburken
4712	Oberwinden	6		RV		1	Winden im Elztal	Hp	Denzlingen–Elzach
4714	Oberzell	6		RV		2	Ravensburg	Hp	Ulm–Friedrichshafen
	Odenheim				S	2	Odenheim	Hp	Bruchsal–Odenheim
4740	Offenau	6		RV		2	Offenau	Hp	Heidelberg–Bad Friedrichshall-Jagstfeld
4745	Offenburg	2	FV	RV		7	Offenburg	Bf	Mannheim–Basel; Offenburg–Singen
8000	Offenburg Kreisschulzentrum	6		RV		2	Offenburg	Hp	Offenburg–Singen
4749	Oftersheim	4		RV		3	Oftersheim	Bf	Mannheim–Haguenau
8128	Öhringen Cappel	6			S	1	Öhringen	Hp	Crailsheim-Heilbronn
4754	Öhringen Hbf	5		RV	S	3	Öhringen	Bf	Crailsheim–Heilbronn
7558	Öhringen West	6			S	2	Öhringen	Hp	Crailsheim-Heilbronn
7764	Ölbronn-Dürrn	6			S	2	Öhringen	Hp	Bietigheim-Bissingen–Bruchsal
4771	Oppenau	6		RV		2	Oppenau	Bf	Appenweier–Bad Griesbach
4773	Oppenweiler (Württ)	6		RV		2	Oppenweiler	Bf	Waiblingen–Schwäbisch Hall-Hessental
4780	Orschweier	5		RV		2	Mahlberg	Bf	Mannheim–Basel
4790	Osterburken	5		RV	S	4	Osterburken	Bf	Stuttgart–Würzburg; Neckarelz–Osterburken
4818	Ötigheim	5			S	3	Ötigheim	Bf	Mannheim–Haguenau
4819	Ötisheim	6			S	2	Ötisheim	Hp	Bietigheim-Bissingen–Bruchsal
4842	Owen (Teck)	7		RV		1	Owen	Hp	Wendlingen–Oberlenningen
4920	Pflaumloch	7		RV		1	Riesbürg	Hp	Stuttgart–Nördlingen
4922	Pforzheim Hbf	2	FV	RV	S	7	Pforzheim	Bf	Karlsruhe–Mühlacker; Pforzheim–Bad Wildbad; Pforzheim–Horb
7889	Pforzheim-Weißenstein	7		RV		2	Pforzheim	Bf	Pforzheim–Horb
4930	Philippsburg (Baden)	6		RV		2	Philippsburg	Bf	Bruchsal–Germersheim
4967	Plochingen	2	FV	RV	S	8	Plochingen	Bf	Stuttgart–Ulm; Plochingen–Tübingen
4969	Plüderhausen	4		RV		3	Plüderhausen	Bf	Stuttgart–Nördlingen
5095	Radolfzell	4	FV	RV		6	Radolfzell	Bf	Basel–Konstanz; Radolfzell–Mengen
7890	Radolfzell Haselbrunn	6		RV		2	Radolfzell	Bf	Radolfzell–Mengen
5111	Rammingen	7		RV		1	Rammingen	Hp	Aalen–Ulm
5112	Ramsbach Birkhof	7		RV		1	Oppenau	Hp	Appenweier–Bad Griesbach
5113	Ramsbach Höfle	7		RV		1	Oppenau	Hp	Appenweier–Bad Griesbach
5125	Rastatt	4	FV	RV	S	6	Rastatt	Bf	Mannheim–Basel; Mannheim–Haguenau; Rastatt–Freudenstadt
5150	Ravensburg	4		RV		3	Ravensburg	Bf	Ulm–Friedrichshafen
5184	Reichenau (Baden)	6		RV		2	Reichenau	Bf	Basel–Konstanz
5185	Reichenbach (Fils)	5		RV		2	Reichenbach an der Fils	Hp	Stuttgart–Ulm
5197	Reihen	7			S	1	Sinsheim	Hp	Steinsfurt–Eppingen
5199	Reilsheim	6			S	2	Bammental	Hp	Neckargemünd–Bad Friedrichshall-Jagstfeld
5222	Renchen	6		RV		2	Renchen	Hp	Mannheim–Basel
5226	Renningen	5			S	2	Renningen	Bf	Stuttgart–Calw; Böblingen–Renningen
5242	Reutlingen Hbf	3	FV	RV		3	Reutlingen	Bf	Plochingen–Tübingen
5243	Reutlingen West	6		RV		2	Reutlingen	Hp	Plochingen–Tübingen
5244	Reutlingen-Betzingen	6		RV		2	Reutlingen	Hp	Plochingen–Tübingen
5245	Reutlingen-Sondelfingen	6		RV		2	Reutlingen	Hp	Plochingen–Tübingen
5252	Rheinfelden (Baden)	4		RV		3	Rheinfelden	Bf	Basel–Konstanz
5256	Rheinsheim	6		RV		1	Philippsburg	Hp	Bruchsal–Germersheim
5257	Rheinweiler	6		RV		2	Bad Bellingen	Bf	Mannheim–Basel
5266	Richen (b Eppingen)	6			S	1	Eppingen	Hp	Steinsfurt–Eppingen
5271	Riedlingen	6		RV		2	Riedlingen	Bf	Ulm–Sigmaringen
5273	RiegelRiegel-Malterdingen	5		RV		2	Riegel am Kaiserstuhl	Bf	Mannheim–Basel; Riegel–Breisach
8055	Rietheim	6		RV		2	Rietheim-Weilheim	Bf	Plochingen–Immendingen
5286	Ringsheim/Europa-Park	5	FV	RV		2	Ringsheim	Hp	Mannheim–Basel
5325	Roigheim	6		RV		2	Roigheim	Hp	Stuttgart–Würzburg
5333	Rommelshausen	5			S	2	Kernen im Remstal	Hp	Stuttgart–Nördlingen
7766	Rosenberg (Baden)	7		RV		2	Rosenberg	Hp	Stuttgart–Würzburg
5378	Rötenbach (Baden)	6		RV		1	Friedenweiler	Hp	Freiburg–Donaueschingen
5377	Rot-Malsch	5			S	3	Malsch	Bf	Mannheim–Basel
5399	Rottenburg (Neckar)	5		RV		2	Rottenburg am Neckar	Bf	Plochingen–Immendingen
5405	Rottweil	3	FV	RV		5	Rottweil	Bf	Plochingen–Immendingen; Rottweil–Villingen
7150	Rottweil Göllsdorf	7		RV		1	Rottweil	Hp	Plochingen–Immendingen
7152	Rottweil Neufra	7		RV		1	Rottweil	Hp	Plochingen–Immendingen
7151	Rottweil Saline	7		RV		2	Rottweil	Bf	Plochingen–Immendingen
5443	Rutesheim	6			S	2	Rutesheim	Hp	Stuttgart–Calw
5468	Sachsenheim	5		RV	S	2	Sachsenheim	Bf	Bietigheim-Bissingen–Bruchsal
5471	Salach	5		RV		2	Salach	Hp	Stuttgart–Ulm
5472	Salem	6		RV		2	Salem	Bf	Stahringen–Friedrichshafen
5538	Schallstadt	5		RV		2	Schallstadt	Hp	Mannheim–Basel
5556	Schelklingen	6		RV		2	Schelklingen	Bf	Ulm–Sigmaringen; Reutlingen–Schelklingen
5557	Schemmerberg	6		RV		2	Schemmerhofen	Hp	Ulm–Friedrichshafen
5558	Schenkenzell	7		RV		1	Schenkenzell	Hp	Hausach–Freudenstadt
7436	Scheppach	6			S	2	Bretzfeld	Hp	Crailsheim-Heilbronn
5570	Schiltach	6		RV		2	Schiltach	Bf	Hausach–Freudenstadt
5571	Schiltach Mitte	7		RV		1	Schiltach	Hp	Hausach–Freudenstadt
5594	Schliengen	5		RV		2	Schliengen	Bf	Mannheim–Basel
5600	Schluchsee	6		RV		1	Schluchsee	Hp	Freiburg–Seebrugg
5608	Schmiechen	6		RV		1	Schmiechen	Hp	Ulm–Sigmaringen
5677	Schopfheim	4			S	3	Schopfheim	Bf	Basel Bad–Zell
8046	Schopfheim West	6			S	1	Schopfheim	Hp	Basel Bad–Zell
5678	Schopfloch (b Freudenstadt)	6		RV	S	2	Schopfloch	Bf	Eutingen–Freudenstadt
5682	Schorndorf	3	FV	RV	S	6	Schorndorf	Bf	Stuttgart–Nördlingen
5686	Schrezheim	7		RV		1	Ellwangen	Hp	Goldshöfe–Crailsheim
5699	Schwäbisch Gmünd	4	FV	RV		3	Schwäbisch Gmünd	Bf	Stuttgart–Nördlingen
5700	Schwäbisch Hall	6		RV		1	Schwäbisch Hall	Bf	Crailsheim-Heilbronn
5701	Schwäbisch Hall-Hessental	4		RV		3	Schwäbisch Hall	Bf	Waiblingen–Schwäbisch Hall-Hessental; Crailsheim-Heilbronn
5703	Schwabsberg	7		RV		1	Rainau	Hp	Goldshöfe–Crailsheim
5707	Schwaikheim	5			S	2	Schwaikheim	Hp	Waiblingen–Schwäbisch Hall-Hessental
5752	Schwenningen (Neckar)	6		RV		2	Villingen-Schwenningen	Bf	Rottweil–Villingen
5766	Schwetzingen	4		RV		3	Schwetzingen	Bf	Mannheim–Haguenau
5770	Schwörstadt	6		RV		2	Schwörstadt	Hp	Basel–Konstanz
5774	Seckach	4		RV	S	3	Seckach	Bf	Neckarelz–Osterburken
5782	Seebrugg	6		RV		1	Schluchsee	Hp	Freiburg–Seebrugg
5826	Sennfeld	6		RV		2	Adelsheim	Hp	Stuttgart–Würzburg
5830	Sersheim	5		RV	S	2	Sersheim	Hp	Bietigheim-Bissingen–Bruchsal
5852	Siglingen	6		RV		2	Neudenau	Hp	Stuttgart–Würzburg
5853	Sigmaringen	5		RV		3	Sigmaringen	Bf	Ulm–Sigmaringen; Tübingen–Sigmaringen; Kleinengstingen–Sigmaringen
8007	Sigmaringendorf	7		RV		1	Sigmaringendorf	Hp	Ulm–Sigmaringen
5863	Sindelfingen	6			S	1	Sindelfingen	Hp	Böblingen–Renningen
5865	Singen (Hohentwiel)	2	FV	RV		8	Singen	Bf	Basel–Konstanz; Offenburg–Singen; Plochingen–Immendingen
7974	Singen-Industriegebiet	6		RV		2	Singen	Hp	Basel–Konstanz
8005	Singen-Landesgartenschau	6		RV		2	Singen	Hp	Offenburg–Singen; Plochingen–Immendingen
5870	Sinsheim (Elsenz) Hbf	5		RV	S	3	Sinsheim	Bf	Neckargemünd–Bad Friedrichshall-Jagstfeld
7178	Sinsheim Museum/Arena	6		RV	S	2	Sinsheim	Bft	Neckargemünd–Bad Friedrichshall-Jagstfeld
7162	Sinzheim	6			S	2	Sinzheim	Hp	Mannheim–Basel
5794	Sinzheim Nord	6			S	2	Sinzheim	Hp	Mannheim–Basel
5873	Sipplingen	6		RV		1	Sipplingen	Hp	Stahringen–Friedrichshafen
5906	Sontheim-Brenz	6		RV		2	Sontheim an der Brenz	Bf	Aalen–Ulm
5916	Spaichingen	5		RV		3	Spaichingen	Bf	Plochingen–Immendingen
8037	Spaichingen Mitte	7		RV		1	Spaichingen	Hp	Plochingen–Immendingen
5938	St. Georgen (Schwarzw)	5		RV		3	St. Georgen im Schwarzwald	Bf	Offenburg–Singen
5941	St. Ilgen/Sandhausen	5		RV	S	2	Leimen	Hp	Mannheim–Basel
5964	Stahringen	6		RV		2	Radolfzell am Bodensee	Bf	Stahringen–Friedrichshafen; Radolfzell–Mengen
5982	Steinach (Baden)	6		RV		2	Steinach	Hp	Offenburg–Singen
5993	Steinen	5			S	2	Steinen	Bf	Basel Bad–Zell
6005	Steinsfurt	6		RV	S	2	Sinsheim	Bf	Neckargemünd–Bad Friedrichshall-Jagstfeld; Steinsfurt–Eppingen
6023	Stetten (Donau)	7		RV		1	Stetten an der Donau	Hp	Tuttlingen–Inzigkofen
6026	Stetten-Beinstein	5			S	2	Kernen im Remstal	Hp	Stuttgart–Nördlingen
6045	Storzingen	6		RV		2	Stetten am kalten Markt	Bf	Tübingen–Sigmaringen
6053	Straßberg-Winterlingen	6		RV		1	Straßberg; Winterlingen	Hp	Tübingen–Sigmaringen
6079	Stuttgart Feuersee	3			S	2	Stuttgart	Hp	Stuttgart Hauptbahnhof–Österfeld
1824	Stuttgart Flughafen/Messe	4			S	2	Leinfelden-Echterdingen	Bf	Stuttgart-Filderstadt
6071	Stuttgart Hbf	1	FV	RV	S	19	Stuttgart	Bf	Mannheim–Stuttgart; Stuttgart–Würzburg; Stuttgart–Calw; Stuttgart–Ulm; Stuttgart–Nördlingen; Stuttgart–Horb; Stuttgart Hauptbahnhof–Österfeld
6072	Stuttgart Neckarpark	4			S	3	Stuttgart	Bf	Stuttgart–Ulm
6073	Stuttgart Nord	5			S	2	Stuttgart	Hp	Stuttgart–Würzburg; Stuttgart–Calw; Backnang–Ludwigsburg
6074	Stuttgart Nürnberger Straße	5			S	2	Stuttgart	Hp	Stuttgart–Nördlingen
6075	Stuttgart Österfeld	4			S	2	Stuttgart	Hp	Stuttgart–Horb; Stuttgart Hauptbahnhof–Österfeld
6083	Stuttgart Schwabstraße	3			S	2	Stuttgart	Bf	Stuttgart Hauptbahnhof–Österfeld
6085	Stuttgart Stadtmitte	3			S	2	Stuttgart	Hp	Stuttgart Hauptbahnhof–Österfeld
6076	Stuttgart University	4			S	2	Stuttgart	Hp	Stuttgart Hauptbahnhof–Österfeld
6077	Stuttgart-Bad Cannstatt	3		RV	S	8	Stuttgart	Bf	Stuttgart–Ulm; Stuttgart–Nördlingen
6078	Stuttgart-Feuerbach	4			S	5	Stuttgart	Bf	Stuttgart–Würzburg; Stuttgart–Calw; Backnang–Ludwigsburg
6080	Stuttgart-Münster	7			S	1	Stuttgart	Hp	Stuttgart-Untertürkheim–Kornwestheim
6081	Stuttgart-Obertürkheim	4			S	3	Stuttgart	Bf	Stuttgart–Ulm
6082	Stuttgart-Rohr	4			S	2	Stuttgart	Bft	Stuttgart–Horb; Stuttgart-Rohr–Filderstadt
6084	Stuttgart-Sommerrain	5			S	2	Stuttgart	Hp	Stuttgart–Schwäbisch Hall; Stuttgart–Nördlingen
6086	Stuttgart-Untertürkheim Pbf	3			S	5	Stuttgart	Bf	Stuttgart–Ulm; Stuttgart-Untertürkheim–Kornwestheim
6087	Stuttgart-Vaihingen	3			S	3	Stuttgart	Bf	Stuttgart–Horb
6088	Stuttgart-Weilimdorf	5			S	2	Stuttgart	Hp	Stuttgart–Calw
6089	Stuttgart-Zazenhausen	7			S	2	Stuttgart	Bft	Stuttgart-Untertürkheim–Kornwestheim
6090	Stuttgart-Zuffenhausen	3			S	6	Stuttgart	Bf	Stuttgart–Würzburg; Stuttgart–Calw; Backnang–Ludwigsburg
6108	Sülzbach	6			S	2	Obersulm	Hp	Waiblingen–Schwäbisch Hall-Hessental
7459	Sülzbach Schule	6			S	2	Obersulm	Hp	Crailsheim-Heilbronn
6127	Süßen	4		RV		3	Süßen	Bf	Stuttgart–Ulm
6107	Sulz (Neckar)	5		RV		2	Sulz am Neckar	Bf	Plochingen–Immendingen
6111	Sulzbach (Murr)	5		RV		2	Sulzbach an der Murr	Bf	Stuttgart–Schwäbisch Hall
6137	Tamm (Württ)	4			S	2	Tamm	Bf	Stuttgart–Würzburg
6144	Tannheim (Württ)	7		RV		1	Tannheim	Hp	Leutkirch–Memmingen
6170	Teningen-Mundingen	6		RV		2	Teningen	Hp	Mannheim–Basel
6216	Tiengen (Hochrhein)	5		RV		1	Waldshut-Tiengen	Hp	Basel–Konstanz
6220	Titisee	5		RV		4	Titisee-Neustadt	Bf	Freiburg–Donaueschingen; Freiburg–Seebrugg
6258	Triberg	5		RV		3	Triberg im Schwarzwald	Bf	Offenburg–Singen
6271	Trochtelfingen (b Bopfingen)	7		RV		1	Trochtelfingen	Hp	Stuttgart–Nördlingen
6276	Trossingen	6		RV		3	Trossingen	Bf	Rottweil–Villingen
6279	Tübingen Hbf	2	FV	RV		10	Tübingen	Bf	Plochingen–Tübingen; Herrenberg–Tübingen; Tübingen–Sigmaringen; Tübingen–Horb
6281	Tübingen-Derendingen	6		RV		1	Tübingen	Hp	Tübingen–Sigmaringen
6282	Tübingen-Lustnau	6		RV		2	Tübingen	Hp	Plochingen–Tübingen
6292	Tuttlingen	3	FV	RV		5	Tuttlingen	Bf	Plochingen–Immendingen; Tuttlingen–Inzigkofen
8039	Tuttlingen Gänsäcker	7		RV		1	Tuttlingen	Hp	Ulm–Sigmaringen
7993	Tuttlingen Nord	7		RV		1	Tuttlingen	Hp	Tuttlingen–Inzigkofen
8038	Tuttlingen Schulen	7		RV		1	Tuttlingen	Hp	Plochingen–Immendingen
6293	Tuttlingen Zentrum	7		RV		1	Tuttlingen	Hp	Tuttlingen–Inzigkofen
6302	Ubstadt-Weiher	6			S	2	Ubstadt-Weiher	Hp	Mannheim–Basel
8002	Überlingen	6		RV		1	Überlingen	Hp	Stahringen–Friedrichshafen
4915	Überlingen-Nußdorf	6		RV		1	Überlingen	Hp	Stahringen–Friedrichshafen
6299	Überlingen-Therme	5		RV		3	Überlingen	Bf	Stahringen–Friedrichshafen
6314	Uhingen	5		RV		1	Uhingen	Hp	Stuttgart–Ulm
6315	Uhldingen-Mühlhofen	6		RV		2	Uhldingen-Mühlhofen	Bf	Stahringen–Friedrichshafen
6323	Ulm Hbf	2	FV	RV		12	Ulm	Bf	Stuttgart–Ulm; Ulm–Augsburg; Ulm–Friedrichshafen; Ulm–Sigmaringen; Ulm–Oberstdorf; Ulm–Regensburg; Aalen–Ulm
6324	Ulm Ost	7		RV		1	Ulm	Hp	Aalen–Ulm
5734	Ulm-Donautal	6		RV		2	Ulm	Hp	Ulm–Friedrichshafen
6325	Ulm-Söflingen	6		RV		2	Ulm	Bf	Ulm–Sigmaringen
6329	Unadingen	7		RV		1	Löffingen	Hp	Freiburg–Donaueschingen
6348	Untergriesheim	6		RV		2	Bad Friedrichshall	Hp	Stuttgart–Würzburg
6348	Untergrombach			NVBW		2	Untergrombach	Hp	Mannheim–Basel
6354	Unterkochen	7		RV		1	Aalen	Hp	Aalen–Ulm
6357	Unterlenningen	7		RV		1	Lenningen	Hp	Wendlingen–Oberlenningen
6362	Unterreichenbach	6		RV		2	Unterreichenbach	Bf	Pforzheim–Horb
6371	Urbach (b Schorndorf)	5		RV		2	Urbach	Hp	Stuttgart–Nördlingen
6376	Urspring	6		RV		2	Lonsee	Hp	Stuttgart–Ulm
6390	Vaihingen (Enz)	4	FV	RV		4	Vaihingen an der Enz	Bf	Mannheim–Stuttgart; Bietigheim-Bissingen–Bruchsal
6418	Villingen (Schwarzw)	4	FV	RV		5	Villingen-Schwenningen	Bf	Offenburg–Singen; Rottweil–Villingen
7153	Villingen-Schwenningen Eisstadion	7	FV	RV		1	Villingen-Schwenningen	Hp	Rottweil–Villingen
7154	Villingen-Schwenningen Hammerstatt	7		RV		1	Villingen-Schwenningen	Hp	Rottweil–Villingen
8003	Wackershofen-Freilandmuseum	6		RV		2	Schwäbisch Hall	Hp	Crailsheim-Heilbronn
6464	Waghäusel	4		RV		3	Waghäusel	Bf	Mannheim–Haguenau
6471	Waiblingen	3		RV	S	5	Waiblingen	Bf	Stuttgart–Nördlingen; Stuttgart–Schwäbisch Hall
8165	Waibstadt	6		RV		2	Waibstadt	Bf	Meckesheim–Neckarelz
6482	Waldenburg (Württ)	6			S	2	Waldenburg	Bf	Crailsheim-Heilbronn
6485	Waldhausen (b Schorndorf)	5		RV		2	Lorch	Hp	Stuttgart–Nördlingen
6487	Waldkirch	6		RV		2	Waldkirch	Bf	Denzlingen–Elzach
6494	Waldshut	4		RV		4	Waldshut	Bf	Basel–Konstanz
6498	Walheim (Württ)	6		RV		2	Walheim	Bf	Stuttgart–Würzburg
6531	Wangen (Allgäu)	5		RV		2	Wangen im Allgäu	Bf	Aulendorf–Hergatz/Leutkirch
6534	Wannweil	5		RV		2	Wannweil	Hp	Plochingen–Tübingen
8006	Warthausen	6		RV		2	Warthausen	Hp	Ulm–Friedrichshafen
6555	Wasenweiler	6		RV		1	Ihringen	Hp	Freiburg–Breisach
6556	Wasseralfingen	6		RV		2	Aalen	Hp	Stuttgart–Nördlingen; Goldshöfe–Crailsheim
6588	Wehr-Brennet	6		RV		2	Wehr	Hp	Basel–Konstanz
6606	Weil (Rhein)	4		RV		8	Weil am Rhein	Bf	Mannheim–Basel; Weil am Rhein–Lörrach
6607	Weil am Rhein Ost	7		RV		1	Weil am Rhein	Hp	Weil am Rhein–Lörrach
7988	Weil am Rhein Gartenstadt	7		RV		1	Weil am Rhein	Hp	Weil am Rhein–Lörrach
7987	Weil am Rhein Pfädlistraße	7		RV		1	Weil am Rhein	Hp	Weil am Rhein–Lörrach
6608	Weil der Stadt	4			S	2	Weil der Stadt	Bf	Stuttgart–Calw
6613	Weiler (Rems)	5		RV		2	Schorndorf	Hp	Stuttgart–Nördlingen
8040	Weilheim (Württ)	7		RV		1	Weilheim an der Teck	Hp	Plochingen–Immendingen
7977	Weingarten/Berg	6		RV		2	Weingarten	Hp	Ulm–Friedrichshafen
6622	Weinheim (Bergstr)	4	FV	RV		6	Weinheim	Bf	Frankfurt–Heidelberg; Weinheim–Fürth
6623	Weinsberg	6		RV	S	2	Weinsberg	Bf	Crailsheim-Heilbronn
7638	Weinsberg West	6			S	2	Weinsberg	Hp	Crailsheim-Heilbronn
7713	Weinsberg/Ellhofen Gewerbegebiet	6			S	2	Weinsberg	Hp	Crailsheim-Heilbronn
6631	Weißenau	6		RV		2	Ravensburg	Hp	Ulm–Friedrichshafen
6661	Welschingen-Neuhausen	6		RV		2	Engen	Bf	Offenburg–Singen; Plochingen–Immendingen
6671	Wendlingen (Neckar)	4		RV	S	4	Wendlingen am Neckar	Bf	Plochingen–Tübingen; Wendlingen–Oberlenningen
6687	Wernau (Neckar)	4		RV	S	2	Wernau	Hp	Plochingen–Tübingen
6716	Westerstetten	6		RV		2	Westerstetten	Bf	Stuttgart–Ulm
6718	Westhausen	7		RV		1	Westhausen	Hp	Stuttgart–Nördlingen
6756	Wiesental	5		RV		2	Wiesental	Hp	Mannheim–Haguenau
7481	Wieslensdorf	7		RV		2	Obersulm	Hp	Crailsheim-Heilbronn
6759	Wiesloch-Walldorf	3	FV	RV	S	3	Wiesloch	Bf	Mannheim–Basel
6765	Wildberg (Württ)	6		RV		2	Wildberg	Bf	Pforzheim–Horb
6769	Wilferdingen-Singen	4		RV	S	3	Remchingen	Bf	Karlsruhe–Mühlacker
6782	Willsbach	6			S	2	Obersulm	Hp	Crailsheim-Heilbronn
6801	Winnenden	3		RV	S	3	Winnenden	Bf	Waiblingen–Schwäbisch Hall-Hessental
6806	Winterbach (b Schorndorf)	5			S	2	Winterbach	Hp	Stuttgart–Nördlingen
6832	Wittighausen	6		RV		2	Wittighausen	Hp	Stuttgart–Würzburg
6847	Wolfach	6		RV		1	Wolfach	Hp	Hausach–Freudenstadt
6848	Wolfegg	6		RV		1	Wolfegg	Hp	Aulendorf–Hergatz/Leutkirch
8041	Wurmlingen Mitte	7		RV		1	Wurmlingen	Hp	Plochingen–Immendingen
8042	Wurmlingen Nord	7		RV		1	Wurmlingen	Hp	Plochingen–Immendingen
6965	Wyhlen	6		RV		2	Grenzach-Wyhlen	Hp	Basel–Konstanz
6988	Zell (Wiesental)	6			S	1	Zell im Wiesental	Hp	Basel Bad–Zell
7024	Zimmern	6		RV		2	Grünsfeld	Hp	Stuttgart–Würzburg
7025	Zimmern bei Seckach	6			S	2	Seckach	Hp	Neckarelz–Osterburken
7155	Zollhaus Villingen-Schwenningen	7		RV		1	Villingen-Schwenningen	Hp	Rottweil–Villingen
7064	Züttlingen	6		RV		1	Möckmühl	Hp	Stuttgart–Würzburg
7062	Zusenhofen	6		RV		1	Oberkirch	Hp	Appenweier–Bad Griesbach
7065	Zuzenhausen	6		RV	S	1	Zuzenhausen	Hp	Neckargemünd–Bad Friedrichshall-Jagstfeld
7074	Zwingenberg (Baden)	6			S	2	Zwingenberg	Bf	Heidelberg–Bad Friedrichshall-Jagstfeld

== See also ==
- List of scheduled railway routes in Germany
