= Schwendi =

Schwendi may refer to:

== Places ==
- Schwendi (Biberach), a municipality in the district of Biberach in the German state of Baden-Württemberg
- Schwendi (Graben), a settlement in the municipality of Graben in the Swiss canton of Bern
- Schwendi (Grindelwald), a settlement in the municipality of Grindelwald in the Swiss canton of Bern
- Schwendi (Habkern), a settlement in the municipality of Habkern in the Swiss canton of Bern

== Surname ==
- Lazarus von Schwendi, Austrian military commander and general in the Imperial Army of the Holy Roman Empire

== Other uses ==
- Laupheim–Schwendi railway, a railway line that connects Laupheim to Schwendi
