= Untergrombach station =

Railway station in Bruchsal, Germany

Untergrombach
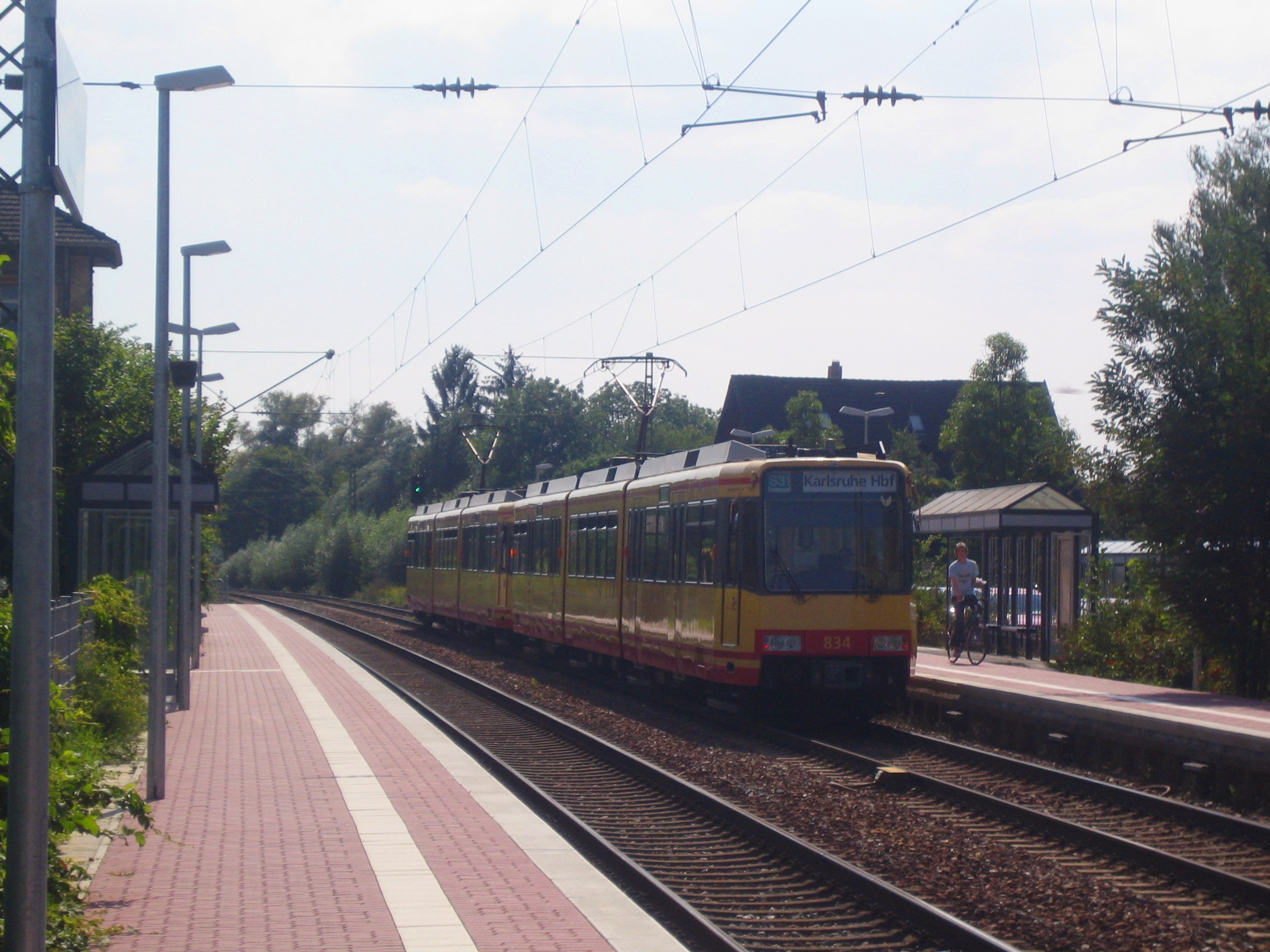

General information
- Location: Untergrombach, Bruchsal, Baden-Württemberg, Germany
- Coordinates: 49°05′15″N 8°32′54″E
- Line: Rhine Valley Railway (km 56.8)
- Tracks: 2

Construction
- Accessible: Yes

Other information
- Station code: n/a
- DS100 code: RURB
- IBNR: 8005990
- Fare zone: KVV: 246
- Website: www.bahnhof.de

History
- Opened: 10 April 1843
Location

Untergrombach station is a "halt" (Haltepunkt) in the Bruchsal district of Untergrombach in the German state of Baden-Württemberg. It is located on the Rhine Valley Railway between Heidelberg and Karlsruhe and is served by lines S31 and S32 of the Karlsruhe Stadtbahn. In the peak hour several services on line S3 of the Rhine-Neckar S-Bahn stop in Untergrombach.

== History ==
On 10 April 1843, rail operations started with the opening of the Heidelberg–Bruchsal–Karlsruhe section of the Rhine Valley Railway by the Grand Duchy of Baden State Railway. In 1846, an entrance building was built at Untergrombach station. In 1847, the track was doubled and, in 1854, the 5 ft 3 in (1,600 mm) Irish gauge was converted to the current 1,435 mm (4 ft 8 1/2 in) standard gauge at great expense.

Untergrombacher welcomed the new route cautiously. Around 1875, with the beginning of industrialisation, the increase in the use of the railway led to new jobs in Karlsruhe and Bruchsal. The line had a positive impact on Untergrombach.

In 1893, a station restaurant was opened. In 1950, the Rhine Valley line was electrified. An underpass for the road to Büchenau was completed in 1993.

Between 1994 and 1996, services of the Karlsruhe Stadtbahn were introduced between Karlsruhe and Bruchsal by the Karlsruher Verkehrsverbund (Karlsruhe Transport Association, KVV). Since 1996, S32 services have run via the Kraich Valley Railway to Menzingen (Baden). Since 1998, S31 services have run on the Katzbach Railway to Odenheim.

As a result of the railway line and the station, among other things, Untergrombach developed into the largest municipality in the Bruchsal area with more than 6,000 inhabitants in 2010.

== Rail services ==
Services on lines S31 and S32 of the Karlsruhe Stadtbahn stop in Untergrombach and connect to Ubstadt, Odenheim, Menzingen, Bruchsal Karlsruhe-Durlach, Karlsruhe Hbf and the Murg Valley.

In the peak hour several services on line S3 of the Rhine-Neckar S-Bahn, which normally run non-stop between Bruchsal and Karlsruhe-Durlach, stop in Untergrombach and thereby provide through services to the Rhine-Neckar region.

Rail services
Service	Route
S3	Germersheim – Speyer – Schifferstadt – Ludwigshafen (Rhein) – Mannheim – Heidelberg Hbf – Wiesloch-Walldorf – Bruchsal – Untergrombach – Karlsruhe Hbf
S 31	(Eutingen (Gäu) –) Freudenstadt – Baiersbronn – Forbach (Schwarzw) – Rastatt – Muggensturm – Karlsruhe – Untergrombach – Bruchsal – Odenheim
S 32	Achern – Baden-Baden – Rastatt – Muggensturm – Karlsruhe – Bruchsal – Untergrombach – Menzingen (Baden)
