= Grenzach station =

Railway station in Grenzach-Wyhlen, Germany

Grenzach
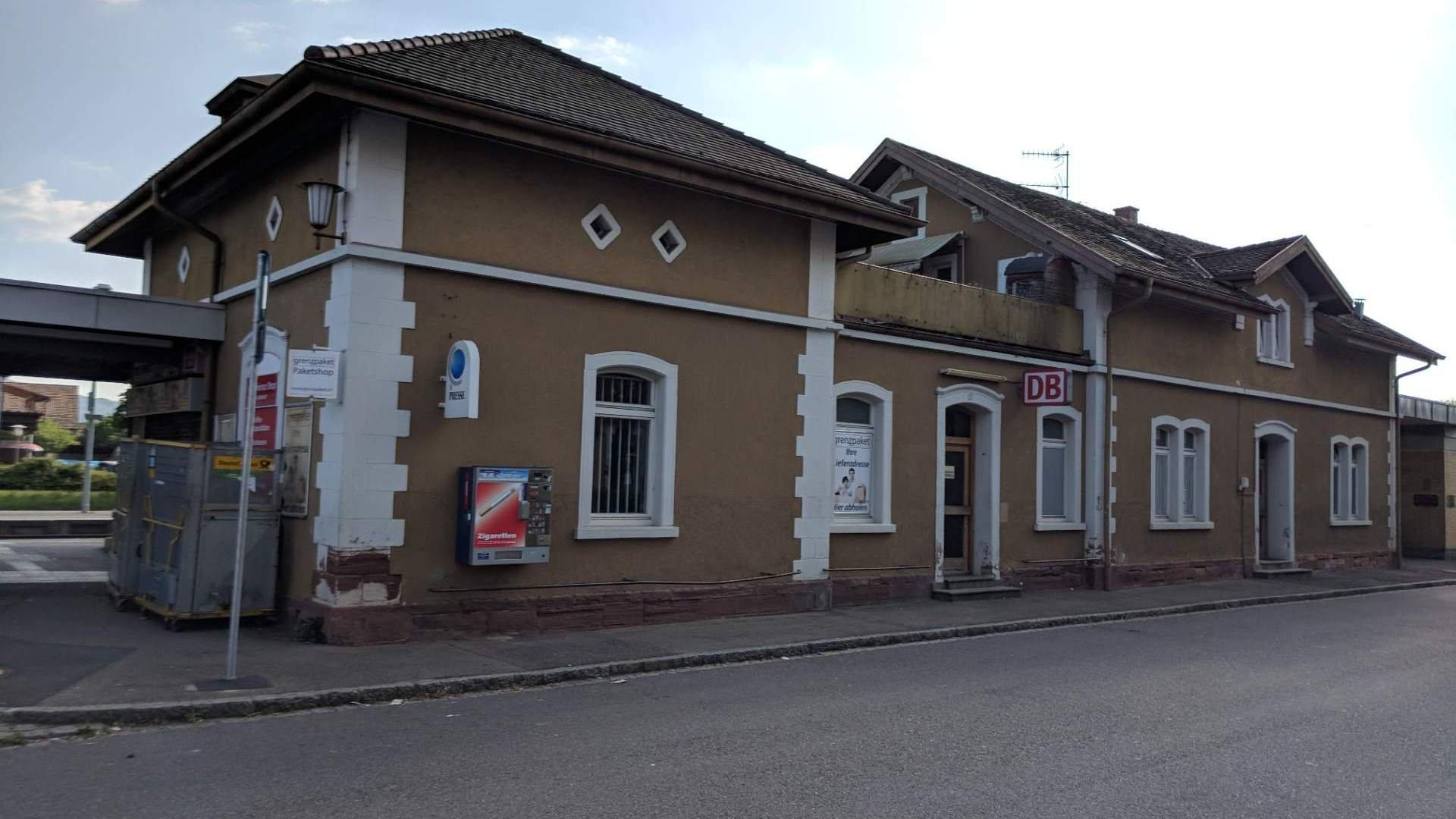
- The station building in 2018

General information
- Location: Grenzach-Wyhlen, Baden-Württemberg; Germany
- Coordinates: 47°33′03″N 7°39′34″E
- Owner: Deutsche Bahn
- Lines: High Rhine Railway (KBS 730)
- Distance: 275.6 km (171.2 mi) from Mannheim Hauptbahnhof
- Platforms: 1 side platform; 1 island platform
- Tracks: 3
- Train operators: DB Regio Baden-Württemberg
- Connections: Südbadenbus bus lines

Other information
- Fare zone: 2 (RVL)

Services
Preceding station	Basel S-Bahn	Following station
Wyhlen towards Basel Bad Bf	RB30	Basel Bad Bf towards Lauchringen
Location
- Location within Baden-Württemberg Location within Germany

Grenzach station (German: Bahnhof Grenzach) is a railway station in the town of Grenzach-Wyhlen, Baden-Württemberg, Germany. The station lies on the High Rhine Railway and the train services are operated by Deutsche Bahn.

== Services ==
As of the December 2023 timetable change, the following services stop at Grenzach:

Connection	Line	Frequency	Operator
RE 3	Basel Bad Bf – Grenzach – Bad Säckingen – Schaffhausen – Singen – Überlingen – Friedrichshafen Stadt	individual services	DB Regio Baden-Württemberg
RB30	Basel Bad Bf – Grenzach – Laufenburg – Waldshut – Lauchringen (– Erzingen)	30 min	DB Regio Baden-Württemberg
