= Wittighausen =

- Municipality
- Coat of arms

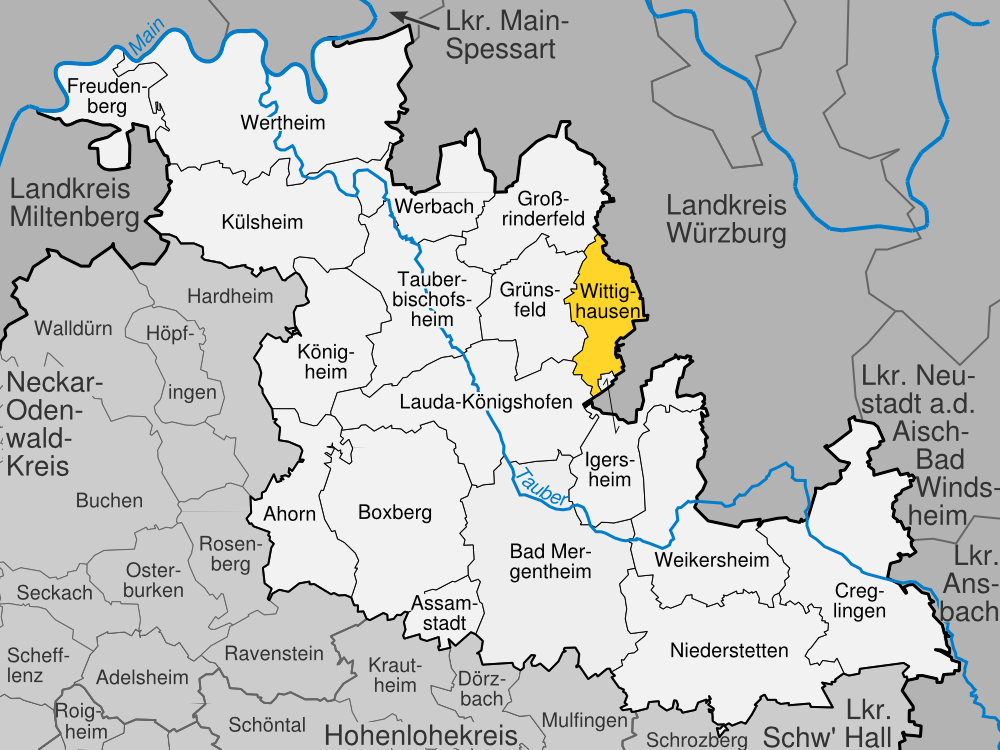
- Location of Wittighausen within Main-Tauber-Kreis district
- Interactive map of Wittighausen
- Location within Germany Location within Baden-Württemberg
- Coordinates: 49°36′45″N 09°50′18″E
- Country: Germany
- State: Baden-Württemberg
- Admin. region: Stuttgart
- District: Main-Tauber-Kreis

Government
  - Mayor (2021–29): Marcus Wessels

Area
  - Total: 32.36 km^{2} (12.49 sq mi)
- Elevation: 245 m (804 ft)

Population (2025-12-31)
  - Total: 1,756
  - Density: 54.26/km^{2} (140.5/sq mi)
- Time zone: UTC+01:00 (CET)
  - Summer (DST): UTC+02:00 (CEST)
- Postal codes: 97957
- Dialling codes: 09347
- Vehicle registration: TBB, MGH
- Website: www.wittighausen.de

Wittighausen is a municipality in the district of Main-Tauber in northeast Baden-Württemberg, Germany. It consists of the villages of Oberwittighausen, Poppenhausen, Unterwittighausen, and Vilchband.

== Geographical information ==
Wittighausen is situated in the quadrangle between the cities of Würzburg, Ochsenfurt, Bad Mergentheim and Tauberbischofsheim on the banks of the brook Wittigbach which joins into the Grünbach in near Grünsfeld.

== Politics ==
=== Mayor ===
- 1987-2002 Werner Hoos
- 2002-2014 Bernhard Henneberger
- 2014 Marcus Wessels
