= Laupheim–Schwendi railway =

Railway line in Germany

Laupheim West–Schwendi

Overview
- Line number: 4510
- Locale: Baden-Württemberg, Germany

Service
- Route number: 753 (formerly 306b)

Technical
- Line length: 16.02 km (9.95 mi)
- Minimum radius: 200 m (660 ft)
- Electrification: 15 kV/16.7 Hz AC overhead catenary
- Maximum incline: 1.7%

The Railway line Laupheim West – Schwendi in Germany connected the town of Laupheim with the then village of Schwendi. The railway line was opened by the Royal Württemberg State Railways on 17 May 1904. It branched off from the Ulm–Friedrichshafen railway. The length of the railway line was 16 km (approximately 10 miles). The railway line had the classification number of 4510. The steam locomotive used on the line, received the nickname Rottalmolle by the local population, referring to the course of the railway line through the valley of the river Rot.

The transport of passengers between the city station of Laupheim and Schwendi was discontinued on 23 May 1971, the transportation of goods on 28 September 1984. Afterwards the railway tracks were dismantled.

Passenger trains on the part leading from Laupheim to Laupheim-West were discontinued on 27 May 1983. However, unlike the tracks leading to Schwendi, the tracks to Laupheim-West were left intact and re-opened on 30 May 1999 for public transport. Direct trains operate from Laupheim to Ulm Hauptbahnhof, without passengers having to change at Laupheim-West.

Works to implement long-established plans for a new southern route, enabling direct connections to Biberach an der Riß, started in 2009 and were completed in 2011. The opening of the southern route took place on 11 June 2011, extending the route from Langenau to Biberach. In order to facilitate railway traffic a second railway platform was built at Laupheim city station during the same period of time. The line was electrified as part of the electrification of the Ulm–Friedrichshafen line in 2018, although electric operations did not commence until December 2021.

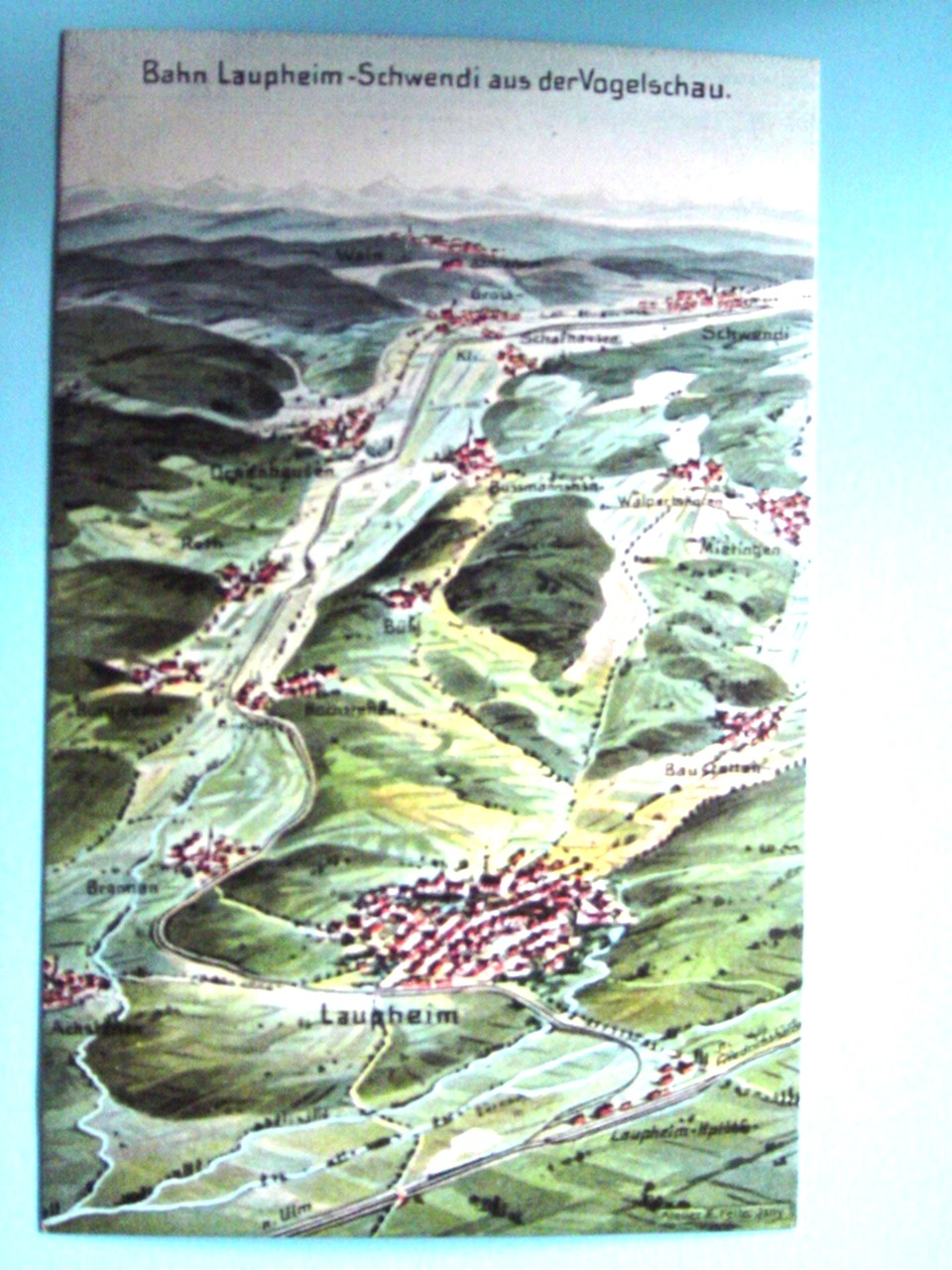
Laupheim-Schwendi line 1910

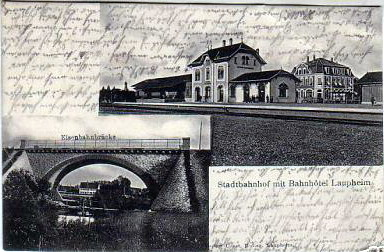
Laupheim, town station, ca. 1904

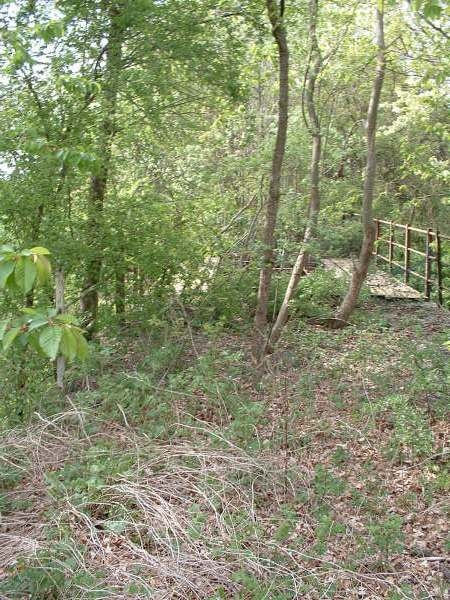
Former railway bridge near Bronnen
