= Steinsfurt–Eppingen railway =

Railway line in Germany

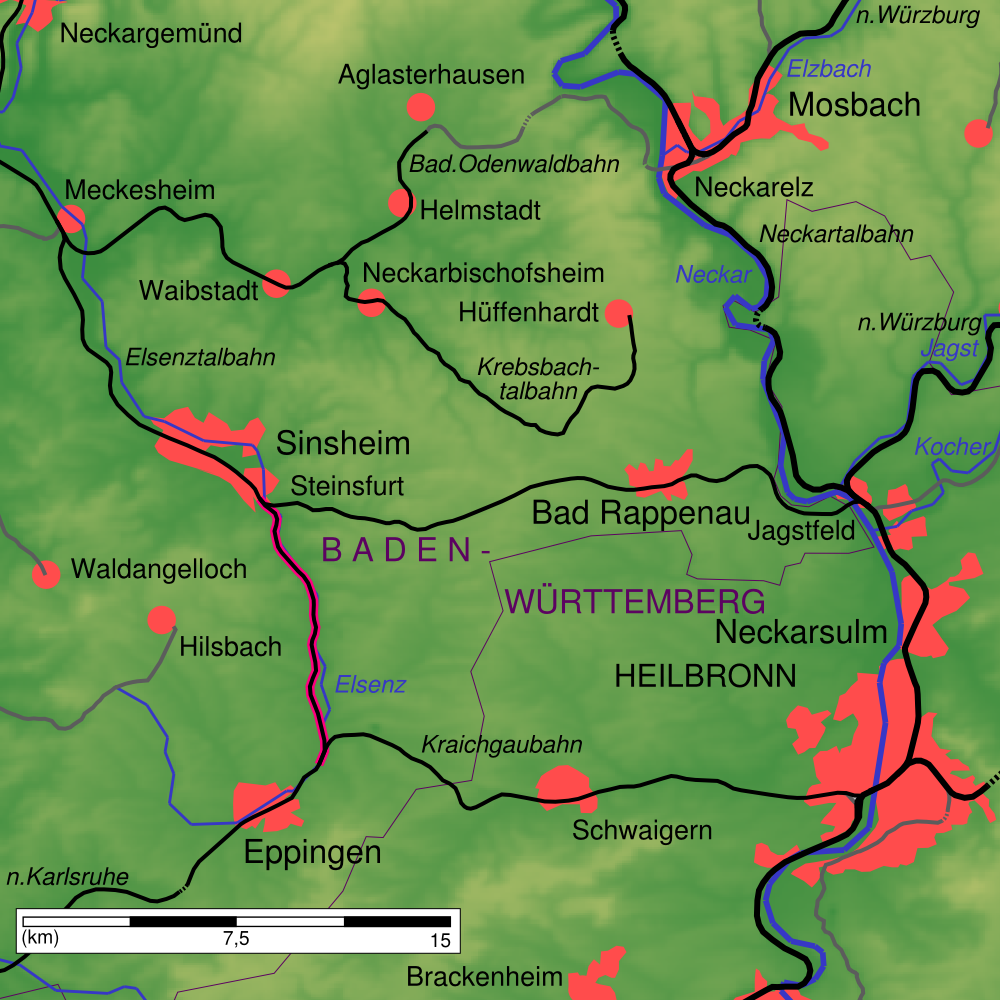

Overview
- Line number: 4115
- Locale: Baden-Württemberg, Germany

Service
- Route number: 665.5 (previously 714)

Technical
- Line length: 12.9 km (8.0 mi)

The Steinsfurt–Eppingen railway, which opened in 1900, is a 12.9 km long, single-track and electrified branch line along the Elsenz river in the Kraichgau region of the German state of Baden-Württemberg, between the Sinsheim district of Steinsfurt and Eppingen, connecting the Elsenz Valley Railway and the Kraichgau Railway. Since 2006, the Baden-Württemberg Regional Transport Company (German: Nahverkehrsgesellschaft Baden-Württemberg) has marketed the line as the Kraichgau–Stromberg Railway (Kraichgau-Stromberg-Bahn, after two nearby regions). The line is part of line S5 of the Rhine-Neckar S-Bahn, opened between Heidelberg and Eppingen on 12 December 2009.

== History ==
The Steinsfurt–Eppingen railway owes its existence particularly to the construction of the Kraichgau Railway through Baden. During its planning, it was at first doubtful whether an agreement to extend the Karlsruhe–Eppingen line to connect with the Württemberg railway network in Heilbronn could be reached. In 1872 the Baden government justified the project, when its usefulness was in doubt, by arguing that it could be extended through Baden territory from Eppingen to the north with a connection to the West Fork line (Elsenz Valley Railway) at Sinsheim and possibly continuing to connect with the Odenwald Railway. For the latter extension it would have been necessary to build a tunnel at Neckarbischofsheim.

In 1873 and in 1878/1879 the Baden government sought the input of the surrounding communities in relation to the proposed construction of an Eppingen–Steinsfurt–Neckarbischofsheim line, continuing to Helmstadt or Waibstadt. These considerations did not take into account local transport needs, only the long-range connection to the Baden Odenwald Railway to create a Karlsruhe–Mosbach line within Baden, continuing towards Würzburg. It was hoped that this would simultaneously solve two problems. On the one hand, it was feared that the proposed extension of the Kraichgau Railway to Heilbronn would lead to traffic between Karlsruhe and Würzburg diverting to it, threatening the Odenwald Railway between Neckargemünd and Mosbach, which had been particularly expensive to build. In addition the forthcoming construction of the Neckar Valley Railway would further reduce the significance of the Neckargemünd–Mosbach line. Both effects would be mitigated by a new, purely Baden Eppingen–Mosbach line, using the Odenwald Railway between Waibstadt and Mosbach.

The Baden Government accepted an 1879 finding that an Eppingen–Steinsfurt line would improve connections from Kraichgau to Heidelberg and Mannheim, but the proposed Steinsfurt–Helmstadt section would be uneconomical. However, a bad financial crisis then prevented the further expansion of the Baden railway network. Once the financial situation had eased again in 1897 the government was able to formally agree to build the Eppingen–Steinsfurt line as a single-track main line. This was adopted into law on 25 February 1898.

Construction started on 15 June 1898 and, after work progressed on schedule, the route was inaugurated on 15 November 1900. Contrary to its authorising act it was built as a branch lines, not as a main line. The construction costs amounted to around 1.6 million marks, which also included an extension of Sinsheim station, which became the starting point for trains to Eppingen, instead of Steinsfurt.

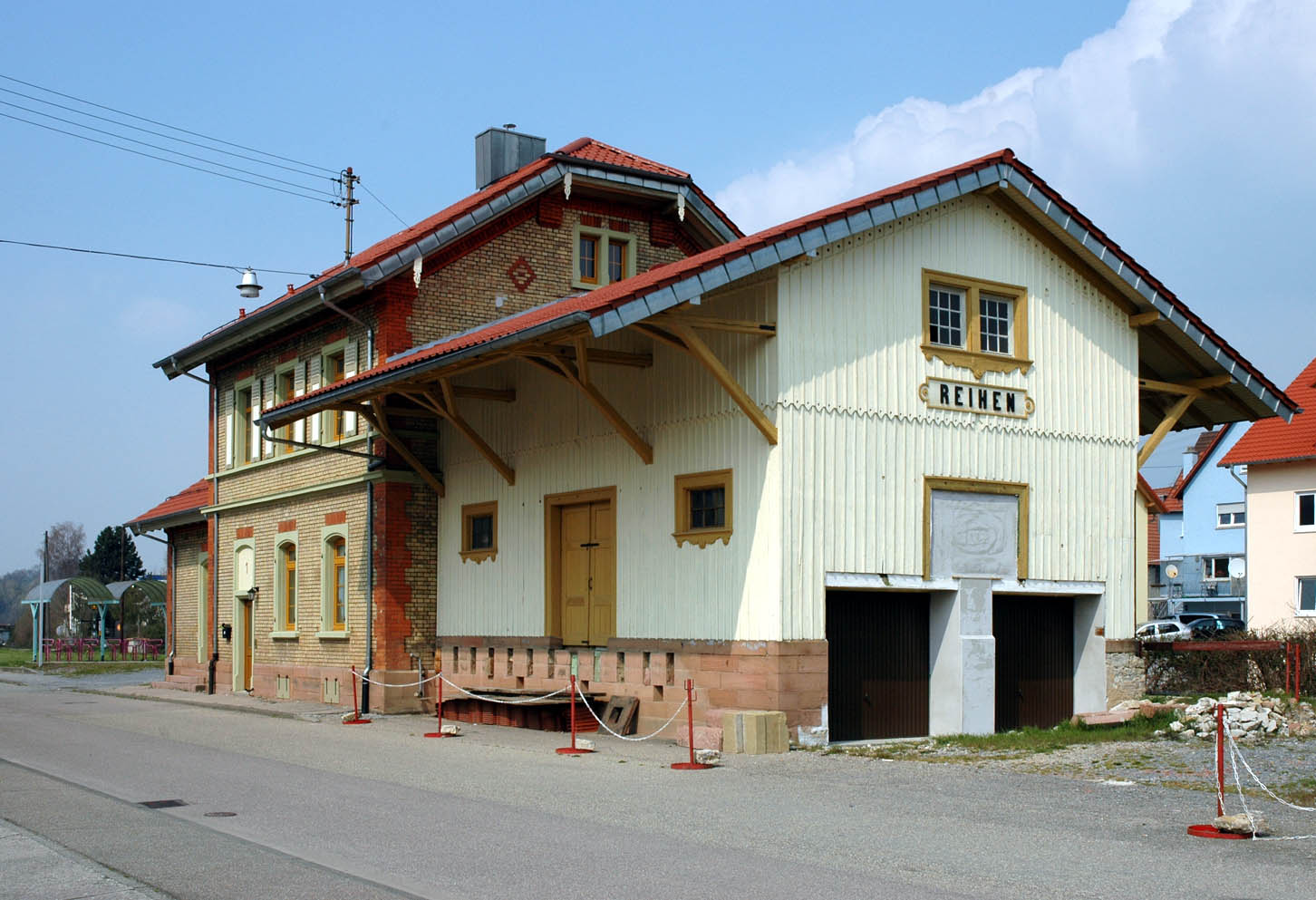
Station building in Reihen (Apr. 2007)

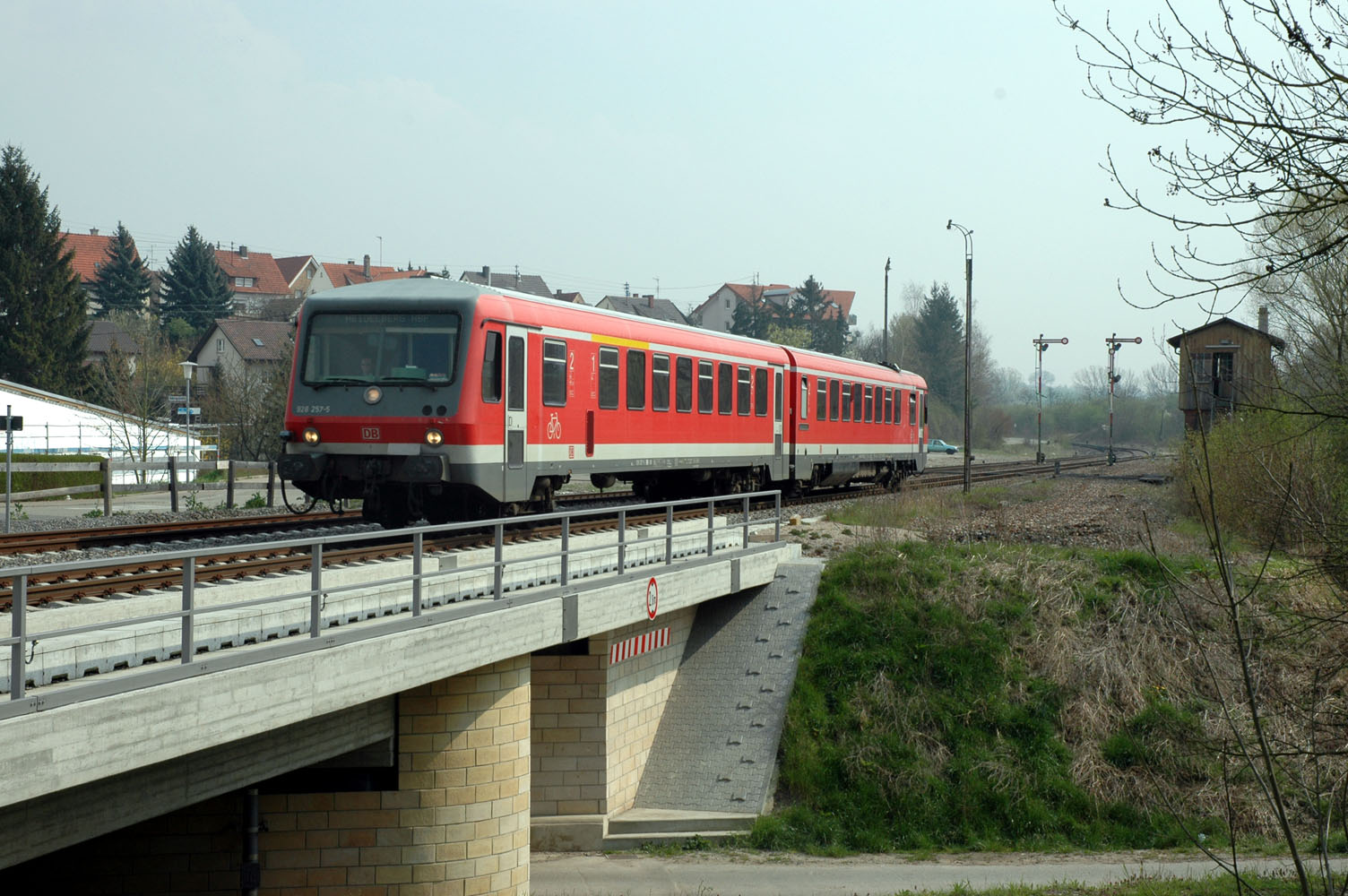
Regionalbahn train from Eppingen near the entrance to Steinsfurt station (Apr. 2007), before the electrification

The line was built during a time of economic prosperity and was rather lavish. A Baden parliamentary committee in 1909/10 noted that passengers could use the line to see castles and elaborate station buildings.

== Operations ==
=== Passenger ===
Between 1955 and 1957 steam hauled passenger trains were replaced by Uerdingen railbuses, which operated on the line until 1990. They were replaced by class 628.2 diesel multiple units and some push-pull trains hauled by class 218 locomotives. These were in turn replaced by class 425 electric multiple units. The route is now served only by trains on line S 5 of the Rhine-Neckar S-Bahn at hourly intervals.

=== Freight ===
The line used to be important during the sugar beet harvest, but on 6 June 2002 the last siding on the line at Ittlingen was removed so freight operations are no longer possible.
