= Rench Valley Railway =

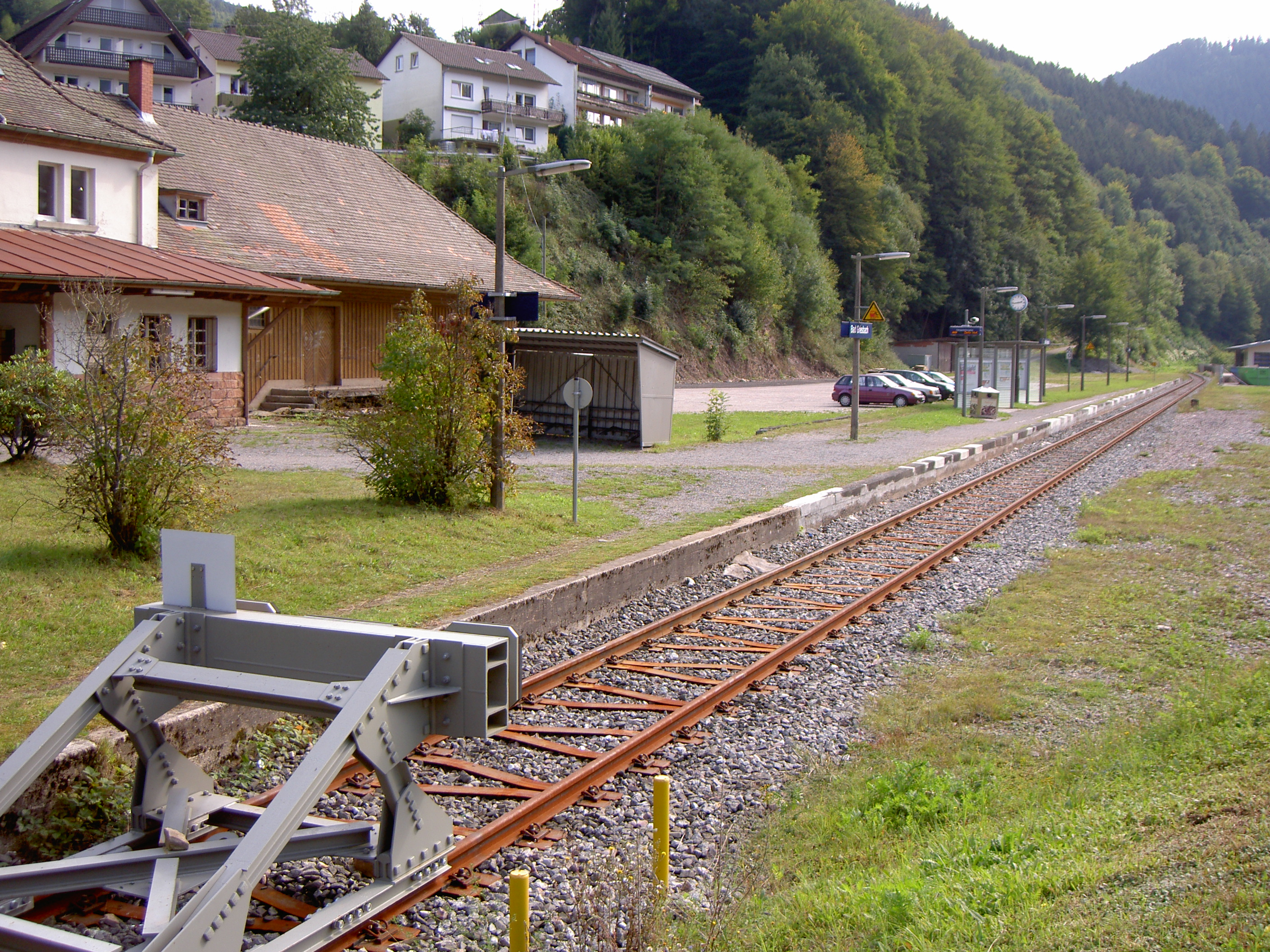
- Terminus of the Rench Valley Railway

Overview
- Native name: Renchtalbahn
- Line number: 4262
- Locale: Baden-Württemberg, Germany
- Termini: Appenweier; Bad Griesbach

Service
- Route number: 718

Technical
- Line length: 29.1 km (18.1 mi)
- Track gauge: 1,435 mm (4 ft 8 1/2 in) standard gauge

The Rench Valley Railway (German: Renchtalbahn) is a 29.1 kilometre long single-track, unelectrified branch line from Appenweier to Bad Griesbach (Schwarzwald), that mainly follows the valley of the River Rench in the Black Forest with maximum inclines of 1:99. It is currently operated by the SWEG Südwestdeutsche Landesverkehrs-GmbH (SWEG).

== History ==
The first section between Appenweier and Oppenau was opened on 1 June 1876 by the Rench Valley Railway Company (Renchthal-Eisenbahn-Gesellschaft). It was taken over by the Grand Duchy of Baden State Railways on 31 May 1909, who had in any case operated the line from the outset. The Deutsche Reichsbahn extended the line on 28 November 1926 to Bad Peterstal and on 23 May 1933 to Bad Griesbach.

From 1998 to 2014, local services were operated by the Ortenau Regional S-Bahn, a subsidiary of the SWEG, having previously been operated by Deutsche Bahn. Since the dissolution of the Ortenau S-Bahn, the line has been operated under the SWEG's primary brand. Trains running on the line usually start at Offenburg and use the Mannheim-Basel line until Appenweier.

In June 2006, DB Netz, which is responsible for the railway infrastructure, commissioned a computer-based interlocking system in Oberkirch, which controls operations between Appenweier and Bad Griesbach. This system, from Bombardier Transportation in Braunschweig, is a first of its kind in Germany, as it is optimized specifically for branch lines. The total amount invested into this scheme was around 4.6 million.
