= Müllheim–Mulhouse railway =

Railway line in Germany and France

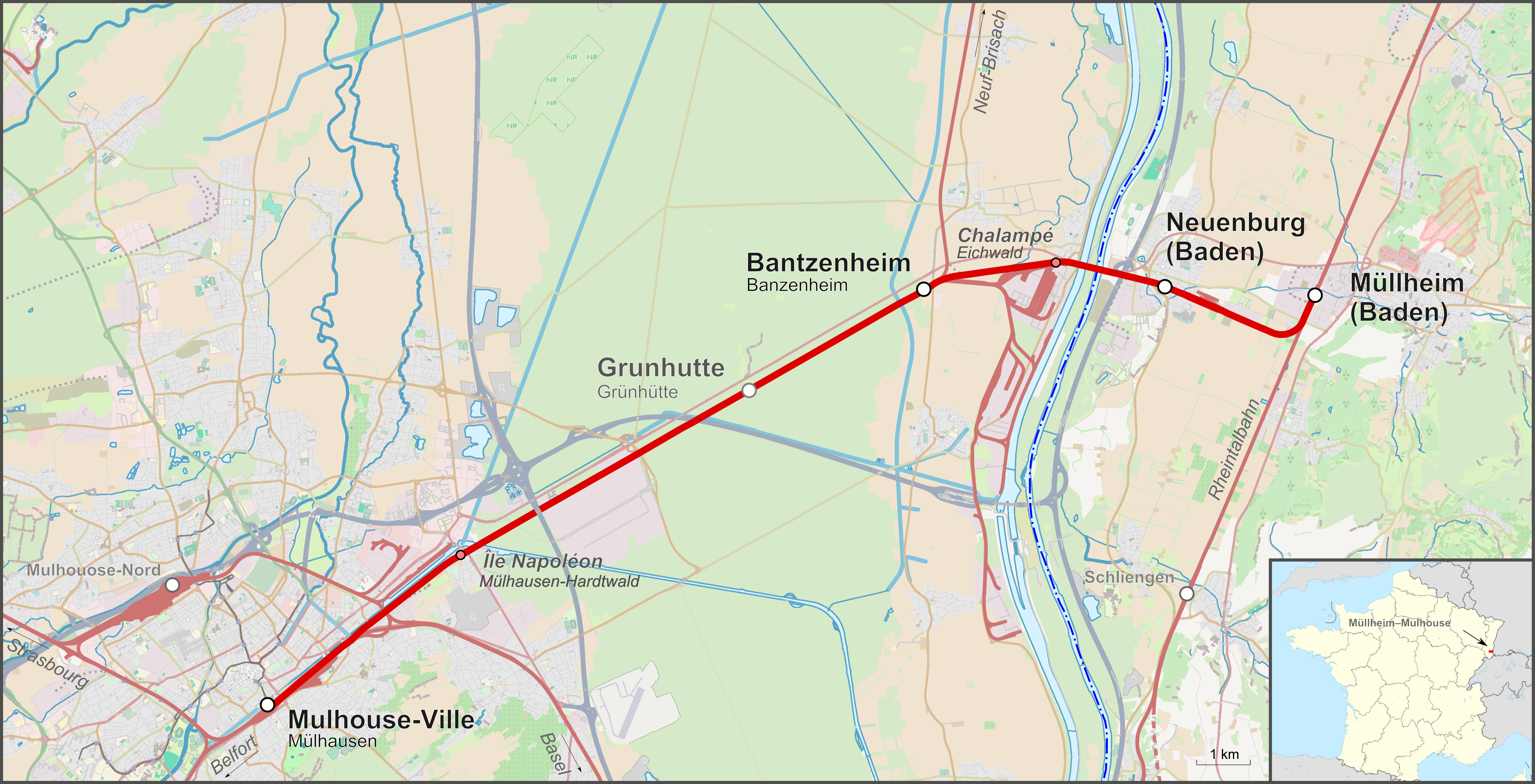

Overview
- Line number: 4314 (Germany); 124 (France)
- Locale: Baden-Württemberg, Germany and Alsace, France

Service
- Route number: 703

Technical
- Line length: 22.140 km (13.757 mi)
- Track gauge: 1,435 mm (4 ft 8 1/2 in) standard gauge
- Minimum radius: 450 m (1,476 ft)
- Electrification: 15 kV/16.7 Hz AC overhead catenary (Germany); 25 kV 50 Hz (France)
- Maximum incline: 0.5%

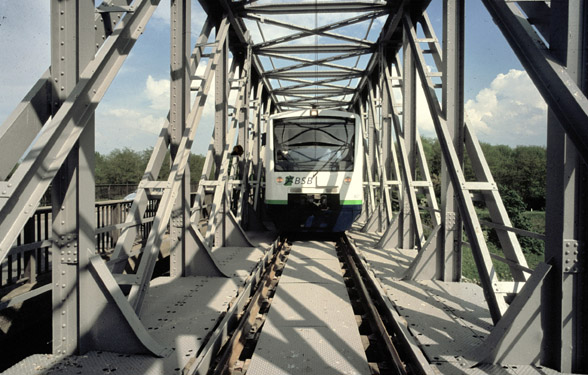
Breisgau S-Bahn train on the Neuenburg–Chalampé bridge over the Rhine

The Müllheim–Mulhouse railway is a 22.140 km-long single-track railway, crossing the Upper Rhine between Baden, Germany and Alsace, France. The whole line is electrified with catenary, using different national electrification standards on either side of the Rhine. It branches off the Rhine Valley Railway (Rheintalbahn) in Müllheim and it connects with the Paris–Mulhouse railway and the Strasbourg–Basel railway in Mulhouse.

Since the closure of the Freiburg–Colmar railway, it is the only railway that crosses the Rhine between Strasbourg and Basel and thus it is an important connection between Freiburg im Breisgau and Alsace. Scheduled passenger services resumed on the line on 9 December 2012, after services had been abandoned in 1980. Since August 2013, TGV services have run on the Freiburg Hauptbahnhof–Paris Gare de Lyon route over the line.

== History ==
=== Establishment and first years of operation ===
In 1865, the first petitions of some neighboring communities were made to the government of the Grand Duchy of Baden, to build a railway from Müllheim to Mulhouse. The Baden government granted a concession under a 30 March 1872 law "concerning the creation of a railway from Müllheim to Neuenburg and possibly to Mulhouse." On 13 May 1874, concessions were awarded for three line crossings over the Rhine; construction began on the line from Müllheim to Mulhouse at the end of 1876. The line was opened on 6 February 1878 to supply the Mulhouse area with food and wood from the Müllheim area. The owners of the railways to the east of the Rhine with 4,592 km of track, the Grand Duchy of Baden State Railway (Großherzoglich Badische Staatseisenbahnen) and the railways to the west of the Rhine with 17,548 kilometers, the Imperial Railways in Alsace-Lorraine (Reichseisenbahnen in Elsaß-Lothringen), also ran operations until 1919. Initially, it was served by one or two pairs of trains daily. There were five pairs of trains between Mulhouse and Freiburg in 1891. A second track was added to the bridge over the Rhine in 1906. In 1913, 13 pairs of trains operated over the line daily; one pair ran as an express between Freiburg and Mulhouse. After the First World War, services over the whole line recommenced on 1 February 1921. Passenger services in France were operated with De Dietrich diesel railcars and in Germany they were operated with class DW steam-powered rail cars built by Maschinenfabrik Esslingen for the Royal Württemberg State Railways.

=== World War II ===
On 7 October 1939, the Rhine bridge and the nearby pontoon bridge built in 1872/73 were blown up by French troops only five weeks after the start of the Second World War. The German railways rebuilt the bridge with a single track for military purposes in 1940 and 1941 and reopened it to traffic on 15 August 1941. As a replacement for the destroyed pontoon bridge, a temporary bridge was built by sappers, the so-called Schwabenbrücke (Swabian bridge). It was demolished following the withdrawal of German troops and replaced by a pontoon bridge. The German troops destroyed the railway bridge again during their retreat on 9 February 1945 by an order by Adolf Hitler.

=== Electrification and abandonment of passenger services ===
The line between Neuenburg and Müllheim was electrified by May 1965. From the summer of 1975, there were only four pairs of trains between Mulhouse and Müllheim. Passenger services on the Müllheim–Neuenburg section were abandoned on 31 May 1980. On the Alsatian side, three pairs of trains daily ran between Mulhouse and Chalampé. The Neuenburg–Mulhouse line was electrified in 1981. The remaining passenger services on the French side were discontinued on 28 September 1986. The annual deficit was 2.5 million French francs. However, freight traffic continued to use the line.

=== Resumption of scheduled passenger services ===
In October 1998, the Breisgau S-Bahn operated a special train with a Regio-Shuttle. Feasibility studies in the spring of 2004 showed that the line would have a favourable cost-benefit ratio.

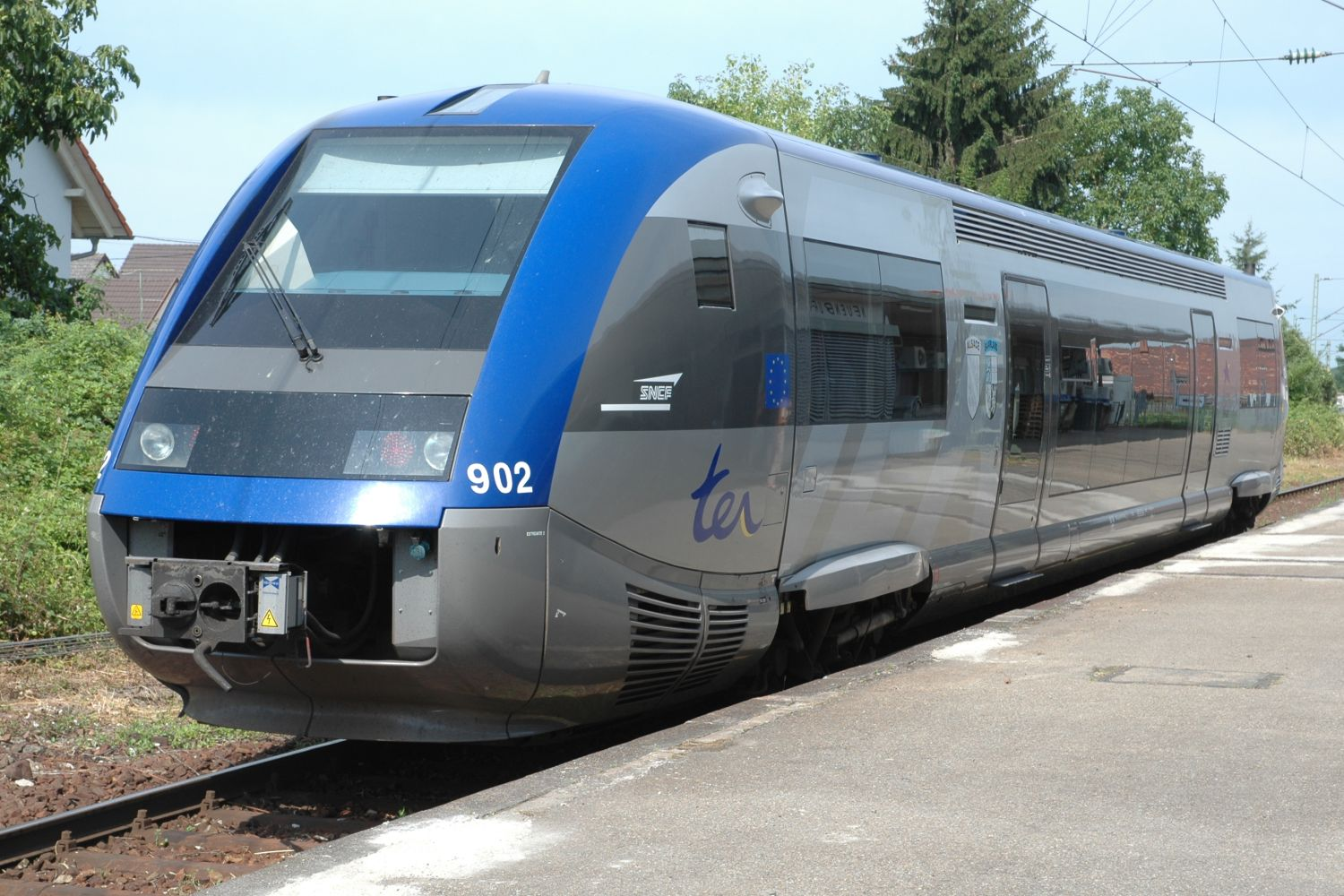
SNCF “Blue whale” diesel multiple unit

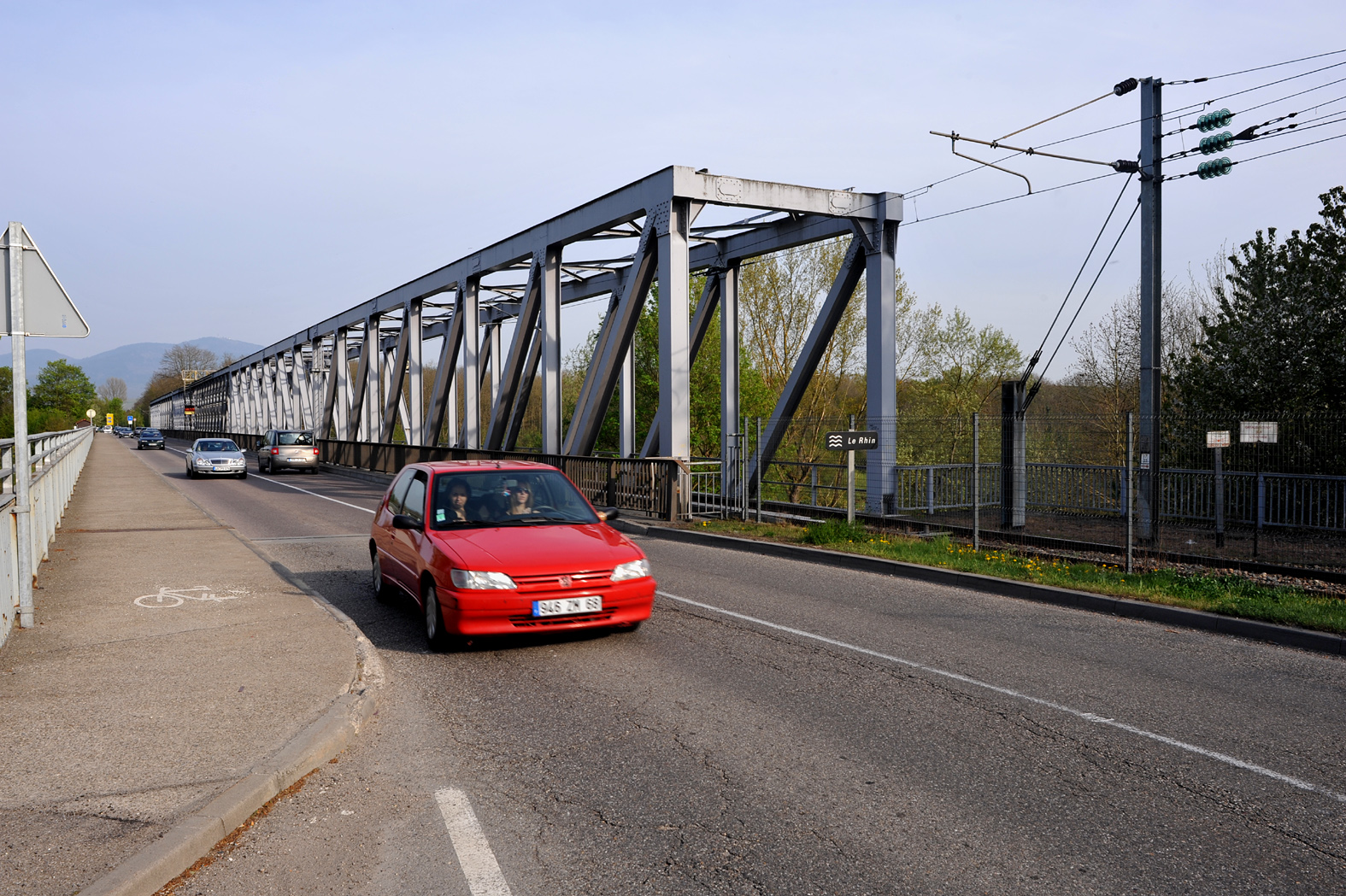
Neuenburg–Chalampé bridge

After a three-week trial operation, the opening ceremony was held for the resumption of passenger services on 27 August 2006. From 2006 to 2012, it was operated on certain Sundays and public holidays as a special event service. In 2006, these operated for a total of 14 days. Daily services consisted of six trips in each direction on a two-hour frequency, (Note: Also in the following years, an international tourist service operated under the motto "Sans frontière" ("without borders"). In 2011, when services could only be run for some days in late summer because of upgrading on the French section, services were also operated on Advent Sunday.) only stopping at Neuenburg. The operator for the German section was DB Regio AG Südbaden on behalf of Nahverkehrsgesellschaft Baden-Württemberg (Local transport company of Baden-Württemberg, NVBW), and for the French section was SNCF on behalf of the Région Alsace. These were operated with diesel multiple units of French class X 73900 (called Baleine Bleue in French and Blauwal in German, meaning "blue whale") with 82 seats. On German territory, the French trains are operated on behalf of Deutsche Bahn.

The resumption of scheduled passenger traffic on the line in the long term was sought. It has therefore been partly modernised since 2009 and, among other things, the mechanical interlockings have been replaced by electronic interlockings. Since December 2009, six pairs of trains have run every two hours from Neuenburg mostly continuing to Offenburg.

The track has also been studied as an option for a rail link to EuroAirport Basel Mulhouse Freiburg. The railway companies of France, Germany and Switzerland proposed, in a memorandum prepared in 2003 and called Trinationale platform Basiliensis, that goods originating in France and Switzerland and continuing on the German Rhine Valley Railway use the Müllheim-Mulhouse route as the preferred future option for bypassing the bottleneck in Basel. This would require the construction of a new south curve at Müllheim.

There have been demands from the Upper Rhine region for an extension of the LGV Rhin-Rhône TGV line, which was commissioned in 2011, to Freiburg. As part of the preliminary studies for the 2003 Federal Transport Infrastructure Plan (Bundesverkehrswegeplan), an upgrade of the section on the German side of the Rhine to two tracks and permitting speeds of up to 160 km/h was estimated to cost €40 million. It was decided not to include the project in the Plan.

Since 9 December 2012, there have been up to seven services daily between Müllheim and Mulhouse, with at least one pair of trains running directly to and from Freiburg Hauptbahnhof. Since then, a French X 73900 (called Baleine Bleue in French and Blauwal in German, meaning "blue whale") has been used, which also stops in Bantzenheim.

Between the end of August 2013 and December 2018, a pair of TGVs ran between Freiburg and Paris on the line.

After the completion of the third and fourth tracks as part of the Karlsruhe–Basel high-speed line, an hourly service from Mulhouse via Müllheim and Freiburg to Sasbach is envisaged under the Breisgau S-Bahn 2020 proposal.
