= Schwendi, Baden-Württemberg =

- Municipality
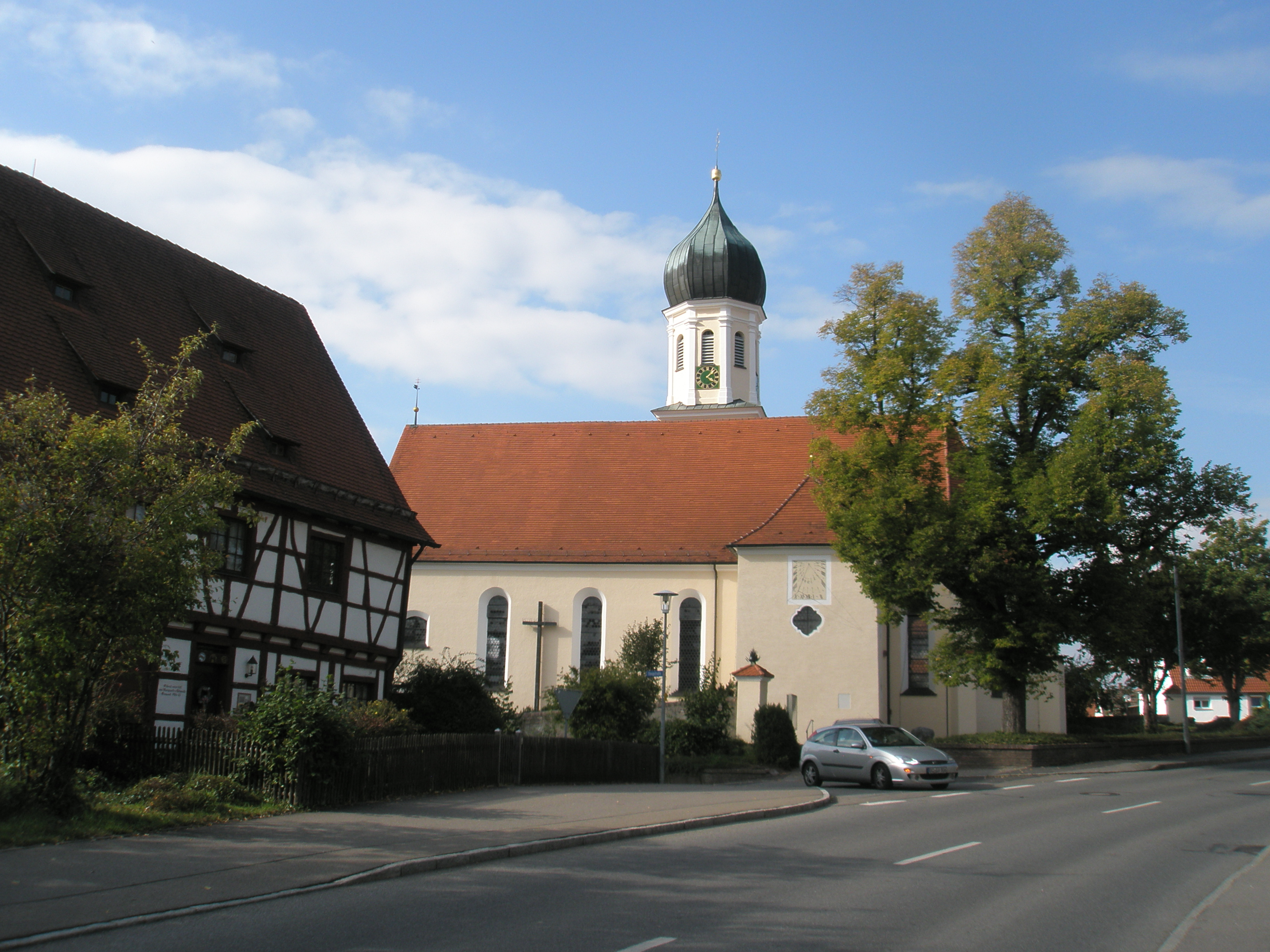
- Church of Saint Stephen and the rectory

- Coat of arms

- Location of Schwendi, Baden-Württemberg within Biberach district
- Interactive map of Schwendi, Baden-Württemberg
- Location within Germany Location within Baden-Württemberg
- Coordinates: 48°10′32″N 9°58′33″E
- Country: Germany
- State: Baden-Württemberg
- Admin. region: Tübingen
- District: Biberach
- Subdivisions: 6

Government
  - Mayor (2019–27): Wolfgang Späth

Area
  - Total: 49.23 km^{2} (19.01 sq mi)
- Elevation: 544 m (1,785 ft)

Population (2025-12-31)
  - Total: 6,897
  - Density: 140.1/km^{2} (362.9/sq mi)
- Time zone: UTC+01:00 (CET)
  - Summer (DST): UTC+02:00 (CEST)
- Postal codes: 88477
- Dialling codes: 07353
- Vehicle registration: BC
- Website: www.schwendi.de

Schwendi (German pronunciation: [ˈʃvɛndi]; Swabian: Schwende) is a municipality in the district Biberach, Baden-Württemberg, Germany, located near Laupheim. The mayor is Mr. Wolfgang Späth, elected in March 2019.
