= Baden main line =

German railway line

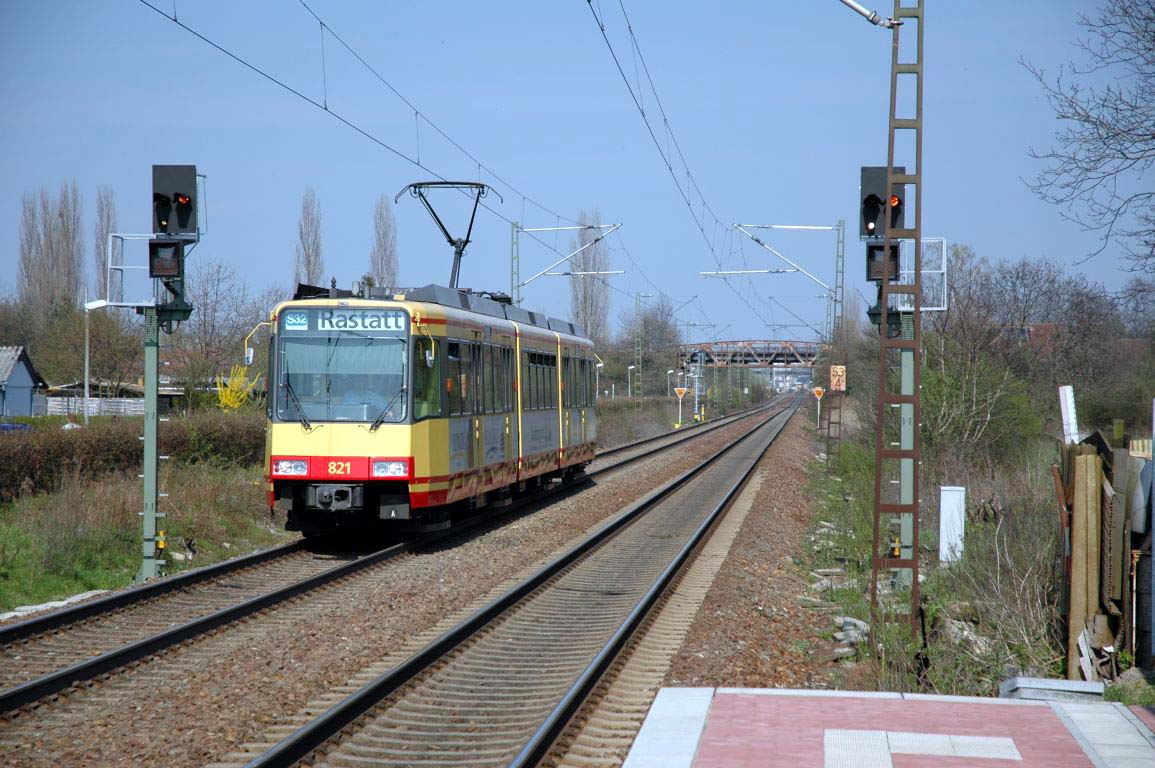
- AVG car no. 821 on the Baden main line at Bruchsal in 2005

Overview
- Native name: Badische Hauptbahn

Technical
- Line length: 412.7 km (256.4 mi)
- Track gauge: 1,435 mm (4 ft 8 1/2 in) standard gauge
- Electrification: 15 kV/16.7 Hz AC catenary
Route map
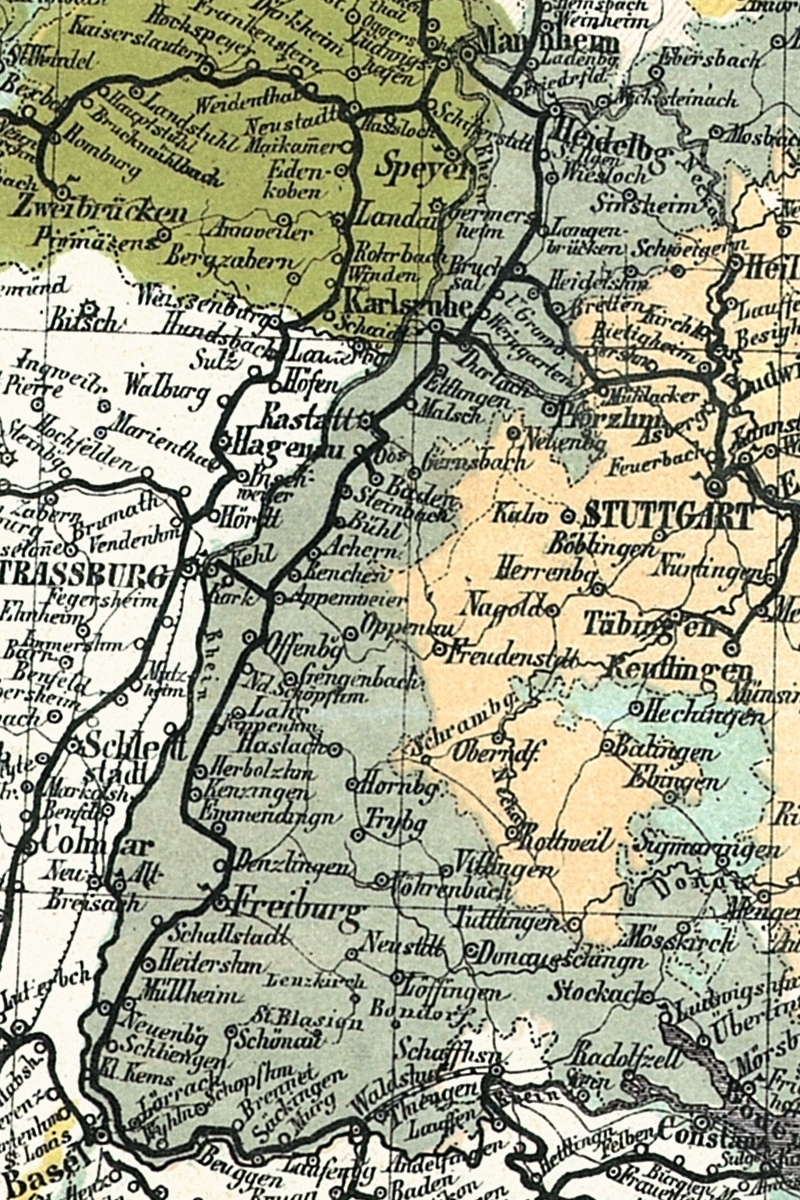

The Baden main line (German: Badische Hauptbahn) is a German railway line that was built between 1840 and 1863. It runs through Baden, from Mannheim via Heidelberg, Karlsruhe, Offenburg, Freiburg, Basel, Waldshut, Schaffhausen and Singen to Konstanz. The Baden Mainline is 412.7 kilometres long, making it the longest route in the Deutsche Bahn network and also the oldest in southwest Germany. The section between Mannheim and Basel is the most important northern approach to the Swiss Alpine passes, whilst the section between Basel and Konstanz is only of regional significance. The stretch from Karlsruhe to Basel is also known as the Rhine Valley Railway (Rheintalbahn) and the Basel–Konstanz section as the High Rhine Railway (Hochrheinstrecke).

== History ==
The Upper Rhine Valley has been an important trade route from Central Europe to Switzerland and Italy since Roman times. With the development of railways in the early 1830s, considerations arose of building a railway from Mannheim to Basel in order to handle the movement of people and goods faster and cheaper than was possible with carts, especially as the Upper Rhine south of Mannheim only allowed restricted navigation. George Stephenson’s locomotive and the opening of the line between Liverpool and Manchester was first discussed in the Baden Parliament by the priest and liberal politician Gottlieb Bernhard Fecht (1771–1851) in the autumn of 1831. He was accused of being ahead of his time and his proposal received no support. The first real initiative for a railway was made in 1833 by the Mannheim businessman Louis Newhouse, but just like the suggestion of Friedrich List, it was not supported by the Baden government.

=== Planning ===
It was only when a railway company was founded in neighbouring Alsace in 1837 with the goal of building a west bank line between Basel and Strasbourg that Baden began to plan the building of a railway to avoid a shift of the traffic flow on the Rhine to the Alsace shore. A specially convened meeting of the Baden Assembly of the Estates (Badische Ständeversammlung) decided in 1838 to build a railway from Mannheim to the Swiss border near Basel at public expense, as had been called for on 31 July 1835 by the Freiburg historian Karl von Rotteck. The line would serve as the main line of Baden and would therefore have a generally straight route on the eastern edge of the Upper Rhine Valley. Baden was the only German state to choose initially to build its new rail network with 1600 mm broad gauge.

=== Construction of the Mannheim–Basel line ===
Section	Date
Mannheim–Heidelberg	12 September 1840
Heidelberg–Bruchsal–Karlsruhe	10 April 1843
Karlsruhe–Ettlingen–Rastatt	1 May 1844
Rastatt–Baden-Baden-Oos	6 May 1844
Baden-Baden-Oos–Offenburg	1 June 1844
Offenburg–Freiburg	1 August 1845
Freiburg–Müllheim	1 June 1847
Müllheim–Schliengen	15 June 1847
Schliengen–Efringen-Kirchen	8 November 1848
Efringen-Kirchen–Haltingen	22 January 1851
Haltingen–Basel	20 February 1855

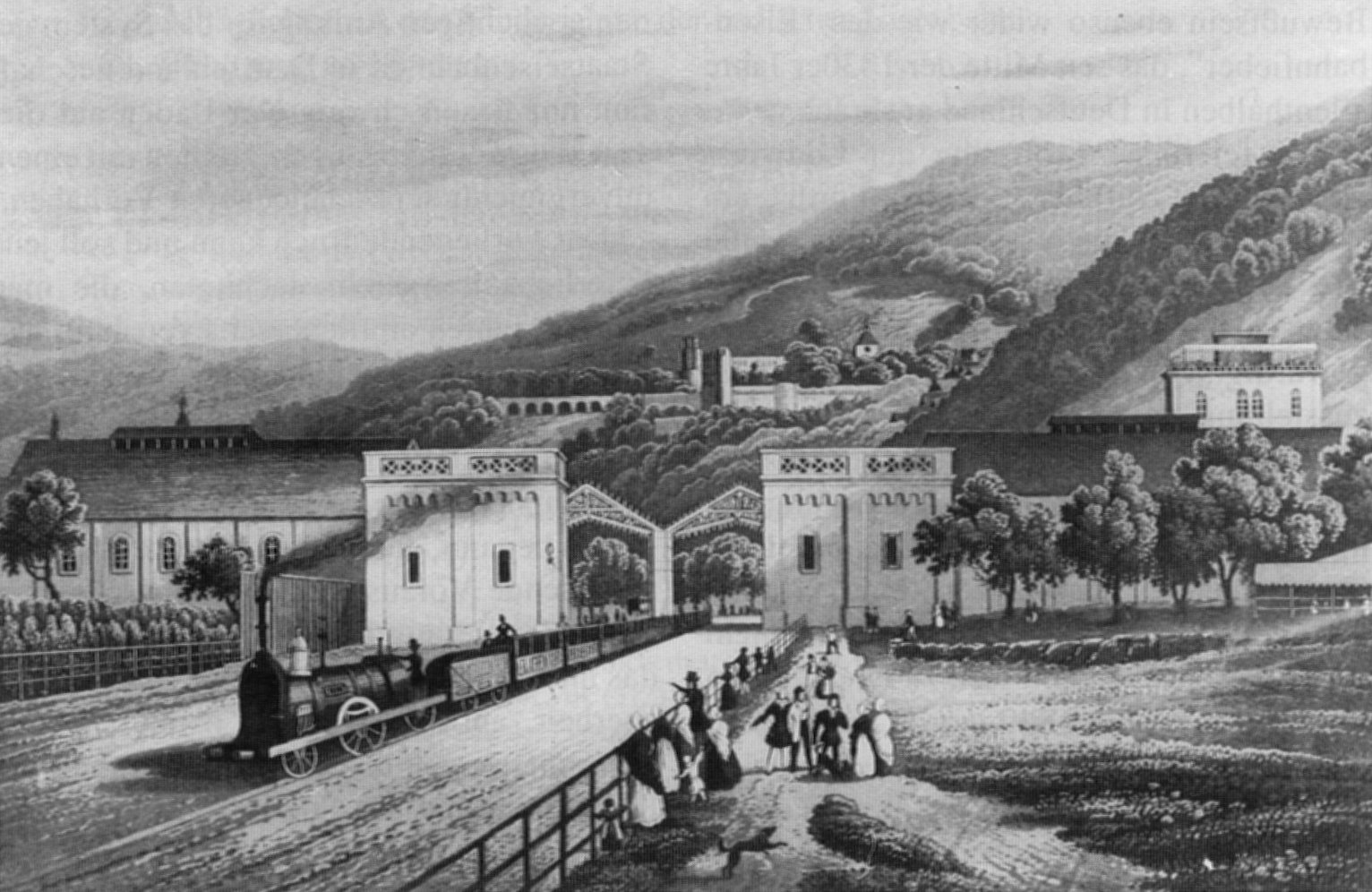
Train leaving old Heidelberg station in 1840

Construction began as soon as September 1838 on the first section between the two new terminal stations in Mannheim and Heidelberg. After two years of construction, this section was officially opened on 12 September 1840. The continuation of the line to the south took place in the following stages: Heidelberg–Bruchsal–Karlsruhe on 10 April 1843, Karlsruhe–Ettlingen–Rastatt on 1 May 1844, Rastatt–Oos (now Baden-Baden station) on 6 May 1844, Oos–Offenburg on 1 June 1844 and Offenburg–Freiburg on 1 August 1845. All the station buildings on the line from Mannheim to Freiburg, some of which have been preserved, were planned by the Baden architect Friedrich Eisenlohr. It was followed by the Freiburg–Müllheim section on 1 June 1847, Müllheim–Schliengen on 15 June 1847 and Schliengen–Efringen-Kirchen on 8 November 1848. The ongoing construction to the Swiss border was disrupted by the events of the March Revolution and the course of the line was damaged at several points by guerrillas. The completion of the section to Haltingen was delayed to 22 January 1851. Once it became clear that all the neighbouring countries had chosen standard gauge for their railways, the Grand Duchy of Baden State Railway (Großherzogliche Badische Staatsbahn) rebuilt its lines and rolling stock to standard gauge within a year in 1854/55.

=== Continuation to Konstanz ===
While the law of 1838 only referred to the construction of a route "from Mannheim to the Swiss border at Basel," discussions turned to the question of an appropriate end point and the connection to the Swiss rail network. While the city of Basel called for a connection to Basel, there were other suggestions in Baden. There was scepticism about a foreign end point for the line, so the Baden town of Lörrach or even Waldshut were preferred. The political debate was dominated by many national arguments and reservations. So, in 1846, Baden granted the Swiss Northern Railway Company (Schweizerische Nordbahn, SNB) the concession to build a railway from Basel/Lörrach to Waldshut, continuing through Switzerland to Zürich in order to achieve a connection with the Swiss railway network in Waldshut in Baden rather than to Basel in Switzerland. However, the Swiss Northern Railway Company could not muster the financial resources to build the line, so the license lapsed. Only the Baden-Swiss treaty signed on 27 July 1852 could achieve a durable solution for the continuation of the Baden main line: the treaty provided for the further construction from Haltingen on the east bank to Basel and continuing through Bad Säckingen to Waldshut. This led to the unusual situation, which still persists, of a German state railway company building and operating a railway line in another country.

The route from Haltingen to Basel was opened on 20 February 1855, followed by the section to Bad Säckingen on 4 February 1856, continuing on 30 October 1856 to Waldshut, where, with the opening of the bridge over the Rhine on 18 August 1859, the first railway connection was made between Baden and Switzerland.

While the focus during the construction of the Mannheim–Basel/Waldshut railway was on the international north–south traffic and the connection of the largest cities of Baden, the Baden-Swiss treaty already provided for its continuation with a rail connection towards the Lake Constance area and Konstanz. But disagreements on the route led to the delays on the approach to Schaffhausen: while the Swiss side preferred a route through the northern Klettgau on Swiss territory, Baden favoured a route through Jestetten in Baden. It could not, however, insist on its preference and the continuation of the main line from Baden to Konstanz, opened on 13 June 1863, ran from Waldshut not through Jestetten, but via Erzingen and Beringen. This last section, directed by Robert Gerwig, completed the construction of the Baden main line.

=== Branch lines ===
Already in the Act of 1838, the construction was planned for two branch lines: the Appenweier–Kehl line, connecting to Alsace, was opened on 1 June 1844 and the short branch line from Baden-Oos to Baden-Baden on 27 July 1845. On 11 February 1872 the bridge over the Rhine between Weil am Rhein and St. Louis was opened and the opening of the connection from Müllheim to Mulhouse on 6 February 1878 provided a further connections to Alsace. Connections to Switzerland were provided with the opening of the Rhine Bridge at Waldshut in 1859, the Konstanz–Kreuzlingen link in 1871 and the Basel Connecting Line, connecting the Baden station in Basel with the Basel central station in 1873.

In the north connections were established in Heidelberg to the Main-Neckar Railway towards Darmstadt and Frankfurt in 1846 and in Mannheim to Ludwigshafen, Mainz and Cologne in 1867.

=== Evolution of the line until the First World War ===
The first section between Mannheim and Heidelberg was originally served by four daily passenger train pairs that took about 35–40 minutes each way. By comparison, the same route takes about 12–17 minutes now. Freight was added in 1845 and the first express train ran between Schliengen and Mannheim in 1847. With further extensions of the Baden main line this express was extended to Basel, Waldshut and Konstanz. From 1863, two pairs of expresses operated daily between Mannheim and Konstanz, needing 12–14 hours for the 414 km line. By comparison, trains from Mannheim to Konstanz via Basel takes about 4 hours today; those running over the Black Forest Railway take about 3.5 hours.

The traffic on the Baden main line was rising rapidly, so duplication soon became necessary. Duplication was completed between Mannheim and Heidelberg in 1846, to Offenburg in 1847, to Freiburg in 1848 and to Basel in 1855. The Appenweier–Kehl branch line was duplicated in 1846/1847. In contrast, the High Rhine Railway between Basel and Konstanz remained single track.

On 22 July 1870, the mobilisation for the Franco-Prussian War made the main line unusable by the public at several points between Rastatt and Offenburg. The Baden State Railway's rolling stock fleet at that time mostly consisted of two-axle compartment coaches, while the Royal Württemberg State Railways had sets of open coaches from the beginning. Baden later also moved to this system.

Trains in Baden operated on the left on two track sections until 1888 and later switched to the right in stages.

The first sections of track on the Baden main line were built to a broad gauge of 1,600 mm (5 ft 3 in). It soon became apparent, however, that the other Central European states had chosen standard gauge, which would have left the Baden railway network isolated. There were already connections to standard gauge lines to neighbouring states in Heidelberg (from 1846) and Bruchsal (from 1853). Through freight had to be reloaded at these points. Therefore, the lines were rebuilt to standard gauge during 1854/55. A total of 203 km of double track and 79 km of single-track were converted, as well as the existing 66 locomotives and 1,133 carriages and wagons. These measure allowed the operations of cross-border freight services.

Construction of railways meant that Mannheim, the largest and most important commercial city of Baden, was now in a peripheral location, as most north–south traffic now ran from Frankfurt to Switzerland via the Main-Neckar Railway to Heidelberg and from there on the Baden main line to Basel. Therefore, Mannheim tried to provide a direct rail connection to the south and sought to build a railway to Karlsruhe via Schwetzingen. The opening in 1870 of the Rhine Railway (Rheinbahn) attracted part of the railway traffic between the Rhine-Neckar region and Karlsruhe from the Baden main line and created an alternative line for the relief of the main line in this area, which had reached the limits of its capacity. This relief route was extended in 1895 for strategic reasons further south to Rastatt (via Durmersheim), so that there are now also two lines between Karlsruhe and Rastatt.

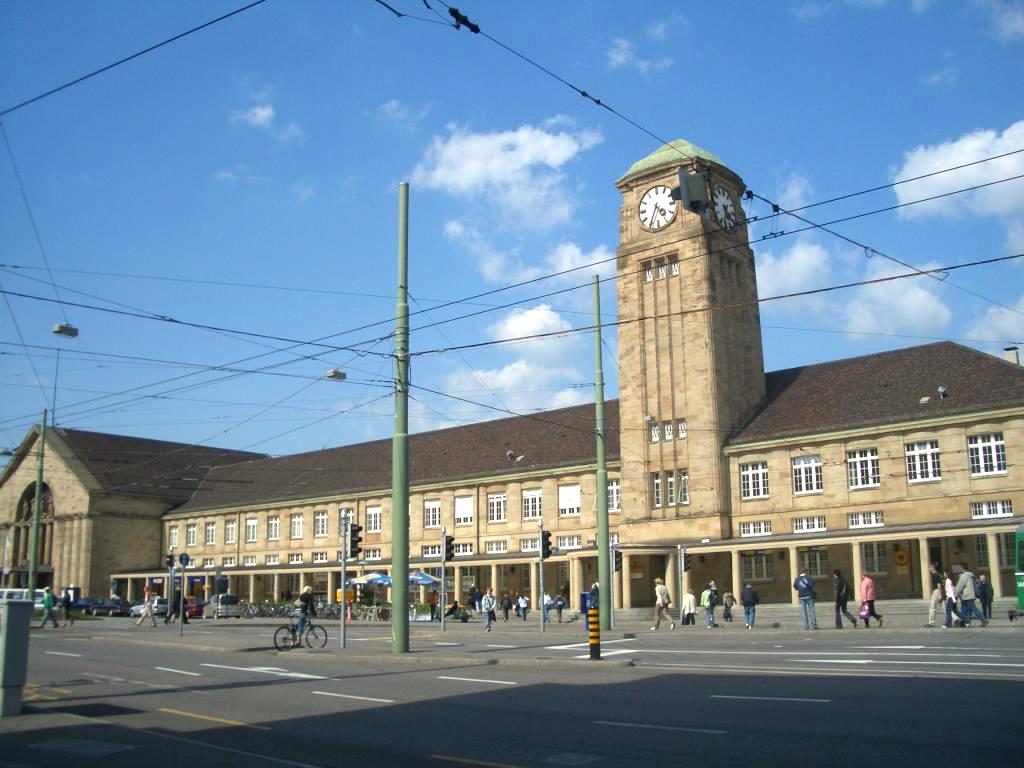
The Baden station in Basel opened in 1913.

The ever-increasing traffic and the construction of the Gotthard Railway in 1882 emphasised the continuing importance of the Mannheim–Basel line. In contrast, the Upper Rhine line between Basel and Konstanz did not benefit from this development as the building of the Basel Connecting Line (1873) and the Bözberg line (1875) provided a direct route between Baden and central Switzerland, so that the border crossing in Waldshut lost its importance and international traffic was handled through the border crossing at Basel. Connections from the Lake Constance region have since 1873 primarily been over the shorter Black Forest Railway, so the Upper Rhine line has become a regional east–west route with no national significance.

Due to the growing traffic between Mannheim and Basel and the growth of cities it had become necessary to remodel the major rail nodes. Thus between 1895 and 1914 new freight and marshalling yards were built at Karlsruhe, Mannheim, Basel, Freiburg and Heidelberg and new passenger stations were built in Karlsruhe and Basel.

=== Development of the route in the 20th century ===
From about 1895 to 1914, the Baden main line was in sharp competition with the Alsatian railway, because the travel times between Basel and Frankfurt and between Basel and Mannheim were almost identical. During World War I, the fast trains ran only on the Baden main line as the Alsace lines in Mulhouse were within reach of the French artillery. After Alsace had returned to France after the First World War, all German trains ran to Basel on the Baden main line.

After the founding of Deutsche Reichsbahn in 1920, the Baden main line along with the rest of the Grand Duchy of Baden State Railway became part of the Reichsbahn, so in addition to the Baden-built locomotives and locomotives built by the other former state railways, newly developed steam locomotives were used on the Baden main line.

The assignment of Alsace-Lorraine to France after World War I meant that the state of Baden, and with it the Baden main line, were now on the periphery of Germany. This also meant, according to military strategists, that it did not allow reliable operations. In particular, the line near the Isteiner Klotz ridge (near Istein) is within sight of the German-French border. During the occupation of the Ruhr, French troops occupied Offenburg and Appenweier in February 1923, so traffic was stopped on the main line and trains had to be diverted over a large area. Both the Elz Valley Railway and the Murg Valley Railway had no connections to the rail network at this time. The bypass route from Freiburg ran by the Hell Valley Railway to Donaueschingen, continued on the Black Forest Railway to Hausach and from there over the Kinzig Valley Railway to Freudenstadt. From here, the trains ran over the Gäu Railway to Hochdorf and from there over the Nagold Valley Railway to Pforzheim and the Karlsruhe–Mühlacker line to Karlsruhe. Although these long-range detours were established in the first month of the occupation, they showed that, with trains having to be reversed in both Hochdorf and Pforzheim and the need to operate over single-track branch lines and the steep sections in the Höllental (Hell Valley), they did not provide a permanent alternative to the Baden main line. Nevertheless, the events showed the susceptibility of the Baden main line to French assaults. As a result, plans were made for developing a Germany–Switzerland–Italy transport corridor via the Gäu Railway and Zürich.

From 1928 to 1939, the Rheingold luxury trains ran between Karlsruhe and Basel on the Baden main line. Rheingold trains were restored on the Baden main line after the Second World War and ran from 1951 to 1987 as Fernzug (long-distance express) or Trans Europ Express services. The Orient Express also operated over the Baden main line: coming from Strasbourg, it ran on the route on the section between Appenweier and Karlsruhe.

During the Second World War, the Baden main line—like all major lines in Germany—was affected by heavy bombardment of railway junctions and the destruction of bridges and buildings. After the war, the line was divided into two parts: the Mannheim–Karlsruhe section was in the American occupation zone, the Rastatt–Konstanz section was in the French zone and under the management of the Betriebsvereinigung der Südwestdeutschen Eisenbahnen (Southwestern Railways Association). The sections within Switzerland were operated under a trust administered by the Federal government. After the founding of the Deutsche Bundesbahn in 1949, the operation of the line returned to single management. The second track of the line between Offenburg and Denzlingen was dismantled and transferred to the French occupation forces in 1946 as reparations. Since the single-track section became a bottleneck on this heavily used route, the second track was restored in 1950 at the insistence of Switzerland, which considered that the congestion endangered the approach to the Gotthard Pass.

As early as the 1950s, Deutsche Bundesbahn began the electrification of the Mannheim–Basel route. The electrification was carried out in several stages:

Section	Start of electric operations
Basel–Efringen-Kirchen	5 October 1952
Efringen-Kirchen–Freiburg (Breisgau)	4 June 1955
Freiburg (Breisgau)–Offenburg	2 June 1956
Offenburg–Karlsruhe	4 July 1957
Karlsruhe–Bruchsal	29 September 1957
Bruchsal–Heidelberg	5 May 1955
Heidelberg–Mannheim Friedrichsfeld	2 June 1956
Mannheim Friedrichsfeld–Mannheim	1 June 1958

Associated with the electrification was also the relocation of Heidelberg Central Station in 1955. The electrification shortened travel times and increased the efficiency of the line. Due to its largely straight alignment, speeds on the line could be increased on most sections to 160 km/h.

The Upper Rhine line between Basel and Konstanz, however, remained unelectrified. The Singen–Konstanz section was electrified on 24 September 1977 as part of the electrification of the Black Forest Railway. In 1990, the Singen–Schaffhausen section was electrified as part of the international connection between Stuttgart and Zürich. In the 1980s, the Basel–Waldshut section of the line was duplicated to provide improved local services on an integrated regular interval timetable.

=== Upgrade as a high-speed line ===
The heavy traffic of the Baden main line led to plans from the 1970s to upgrade the line as a multi-track route. Congestion was relieved on the northern section of the main line between Mannheim Baden and Bruchsal with the opening of the Mannheim–Stuttgart high-speed railway in stages between 1987 and 1991.

The Federal Transport Infrastructure Plan (Bundesverkehrswegeplan) of 1985 also listed the quadruplication of the Karlsruhe–Offenburg section and the addition of a third track between Offenburg and Basel as part of the construction of a Neu- und Ausbaustrecke Karlsruhe–Basel (i.e. a mixture of new high-speed line and upgraded line) as urgently needed.

== Sections ==
The railways of Baden main line can be categorised as follows:

- Baden main line
  - Rhine Valley Railway
    - Mannheim–Heidelberg
    - Heidelberg–Karlsruhe, also known as the Baden-Kurpfalz-Bahn (Baden–Palatinate Railway)
    - Karlsruhe–Basel
  - High Rhine Railway

=== Mannheim–Heidelberg ===
The Mannheim–Heidelberg section is the oldest railway in southwestern Germany. It runs almost straight across the Upper Rhine Plain and originally only had a single intermediate station at the halfway point in Friedrichsfeld. Originally it was planned to build the line a little further to the north, which would have allowed a better connection with Seckenheim. However, these plans were thwarted by the resistance of the local population. The Main-Neckar Railway connects to the Mannheim–Heidelberg line in Friedrichsfeld at a “wye” junction.

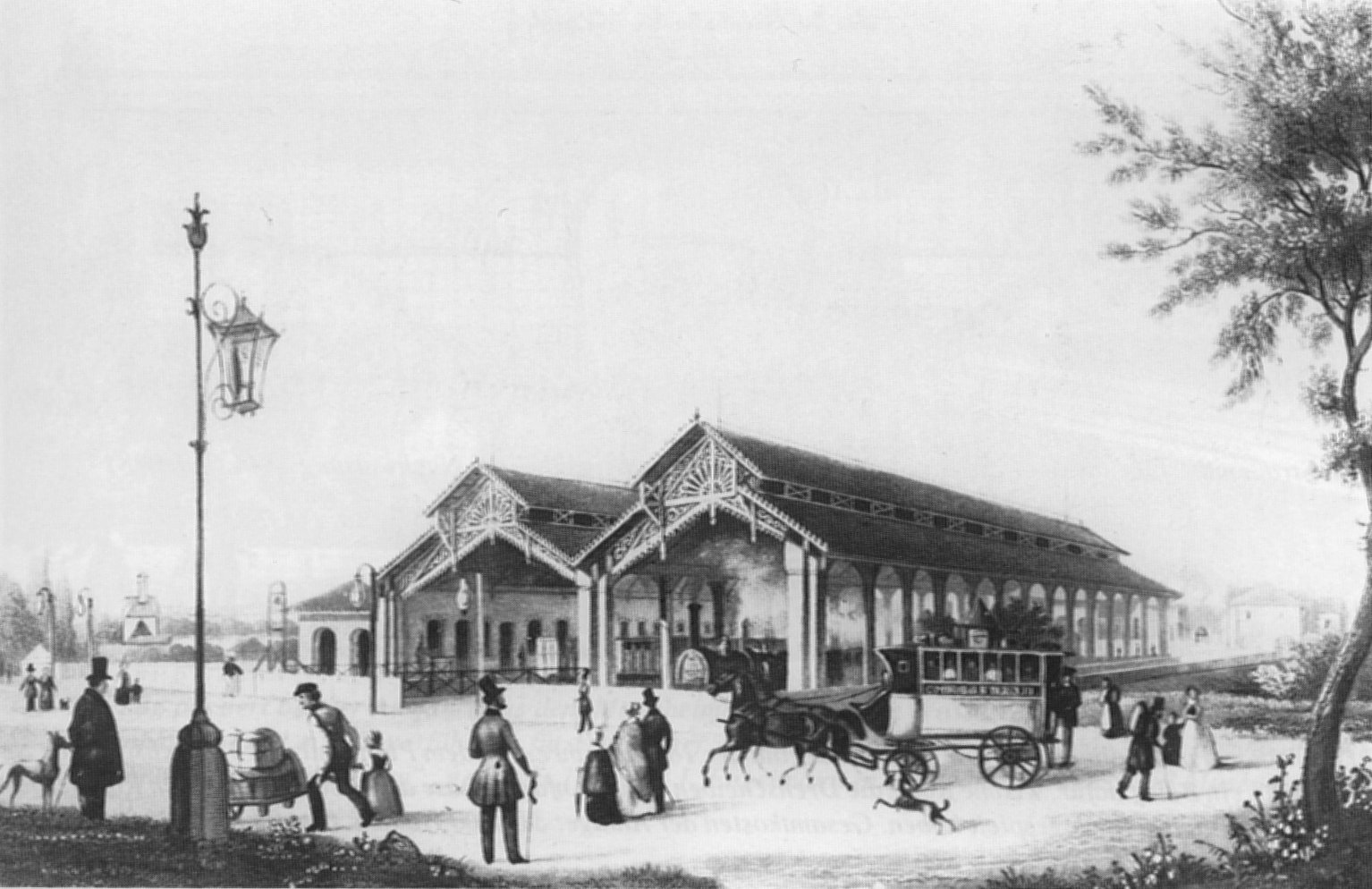
The original Mannheim station, about 1840

The first Mannheim station was built to the north of the existing facility at the current Tattersall tram stop and designed to allow an extension to the north, but this never came to pass. During the construction of the bridge over the Rhine to Mannheim (now the Konrad Adenauer Bridge), the station was rebuilt at its present location with completion in 1876. A freight yard was built in Mannheim harbour in 1854, which was followed by the building in 1906 of a marshalling yard south of Mannheim station, which is now Germany's second largest marshalling yard.

The original Heidelberg station was at today's Adenauerplatz and designed as a railway terminus so that it could be built as close to town as possible. The terminus of the Main-Neckar Railway was directly adjacent. As early as 1862 the station was partially converted into a through station. A new freight yard was completed on the western outskirts of Heidelberg in 1914. Work was already underway for the relocation of Heidelberg's main station to the western suburbs, but this was interrupted by World War I and it continued until after World War II. The construction of the new station as a through station was completed in 1955.

Meanwhile, the Heidelberg freight yard and the locomotive depot were closed and only one pair of tracks of the four-track railway between Friedrichsfeld and Wieblingen is currently in use. The line is used by Intercity (IC) or Intercity-Express (ICE) services every hour. S-Bahn services (since 2003), local services and freight trains run at high frequencies.

=== Heidelberg–Karlsruhe ===
For several years this section has been called for marketing purposes the Baden-Kurpfalz-Bahn (Baden–Palatinate Railway), as Heidelberg was the historic capital of the Palatinate.

==== Route ====
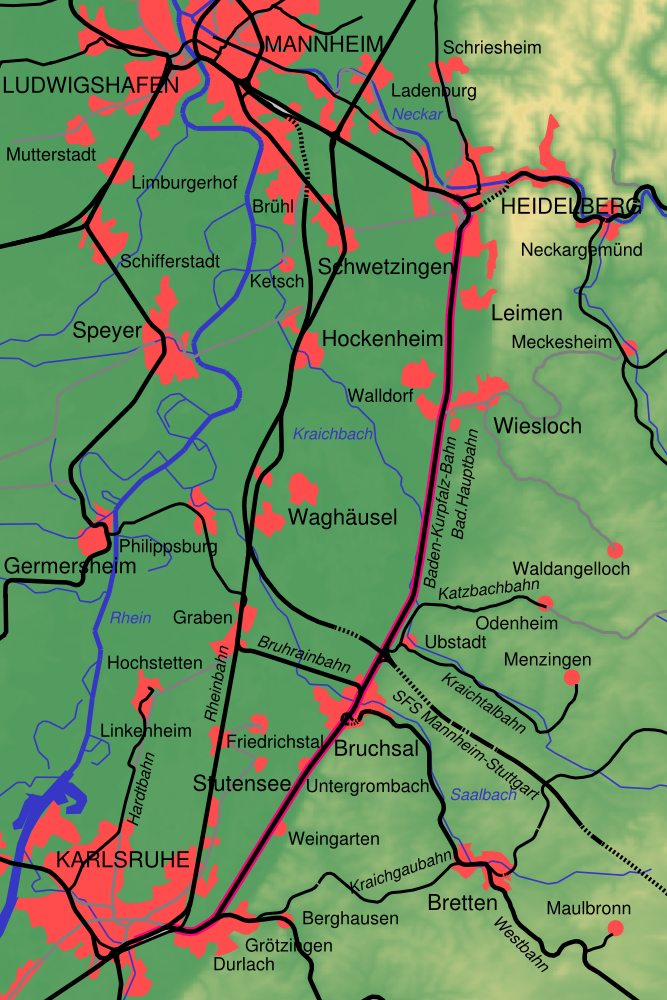
Overview

The section of line between Heidelberg and Karlsruhe runs along the eastern edge of the Upper Rhine Valley from north to south. From Heidelberg station, the line runs south through the stations of Heidelberg-Kirchheim, St. Ilgen and Wiesloch-Walldorf and passes under the A 6 in the Hochholz forest. This is followed by Rot-Malsch, Kislau castle on the western side of the line and Ubstadt-Weiher station. The Kraich Valley Railway and the Katzbach Railway connect to the line from the left, then it passes under that the Mannheim–Stuttgart high-speed line, which is connected to the east by curves to and from the Baden main line at Bruchsal Rollenberg junction. It continues to Bruchsal station, where the Württemberg Western Railway and the Bruhrain Railway terminate. The track then runs along the edge of the Kraichgau via Untergrombach and Weingarten to Karlsruhe-Durlach station and passes under the A 5 and reaches Karlsruhe Central Station.

In 1911, the route in the area of Durlach changed as a result of the relocation of Durlach station to the west in order to increase the curve radii. Karlsruhe station was on the southern edge of the city centre until 1913. Due to the limited capacity of this station, a new station was opened on the southern outskirts in 1913. In 1895, a marshalling yard was created on the southern outskirts of the city, but its operations were moved to Mannheim a few years ago.

Approximately level with Durlach an industrial siding formerly branched off and ran for about a kilometre parallel with the Baden line to the north and then veered to the west and ran to the Bosch factory. In Weingarten and Untergrombach tracks formerly branched off to quarries, which have since been converted into lakes for swimming (Baggersee). In Bruchsal freight sidings run to the south of the city, in addition, there are still sidings at Wiesloch-Walldorf station.

==== Amenities ====
During the introduction of the S-Bahn, stations were modernised and made accessible for the disabled and the signalling and interlockings were renewed. In Weingarten, Untergrombach and Bruchsal Bildungszentrum, the platform heights were raised to 55 cm for step-free access to the Karlsruhe Stadtbahn trains. At all stations between Bruchsal and Heidelberg the platform heights were raised to 76 cm for step-free access to the Rhine-Neckar S-Bahn trains. At Karlsruhe-Durlach and Bruchsal stations there are platform at both heights, as they are served by both networks. Several stations (e.g., Bad Schönborn Süd and Walldorf-Wiesloch) also have a third platform track.

The track is equipped with the latest signalling technology (colour lights) and equipped for speeds of up to 160 km/h. The “other needs” section of the Federal Transport Infrastructure Plan (Bundesverkehrswegeplan) provides for the refurbishment of the track for a top speed of 200 km/h, but, so far, the top speed is 160 km/h.

==== Operations ====
IC and ICE trains run on the line and connect Heidelberg, Karlsruhe and Stuttgart. Since 2007, TGV trains on the Paris–Strasbourg–Stuttgart route run on the southern section between Karlsruhe and Bruchsal. The line is supplemented by S-Bahn services between Heidelberg and Karlsruhe and Karlsruhe Stadtbahn services operated by Albtal-Verkehrs-Gesellschaft (Alb Valley Transport Company) between Karlsruhe and Bruchsal, so that at least two trains operate each hour in each direction.

Since 1994, the section between Karlsruhe and Bruchsal has been integrated in the Karlsruhe Stadtbahn network. Services were introduced over two years, to Menzingen on the Kraich Valley Railway in 1996 and to Odenheim on the Katzbach railway in 1998. In early 1996, the new Bruchsal Bildungszentrum station was opened between Untergrombach and Bruchsal stations, this station mainly serves the Bildungszentrum, an educational facility.

Since December 2003, the entire line has also been part of the Rhine-Neckar S-Bahn. During the introduction of the S-Bahn, stations were modernised and made barrier-free and the signalling and interlocking systems were renewed. Each hour S-Bahn line S 4 operates between Heidelberg and Bruchsal and line S 3 runs between Heidelberg and Karlsruhe, together providing a service every half-hour between Heidelberg and Bruchsal.

=== Karlsruhe–Basel ===
The line between Karlsruhe and Basel is one of the busiest railway lines in Germany. It runs on the eastern edge of the Upper Rhine valley. While the line is mostly straight, it has, in the southern section between Schliengen and Efringen-Kirchen a winding route passing between the Rhine and the Isteiner Klotz ridge above the villages on the slopes of the Black Forest. A lower alignment similar to the A 5 autobahn was not possible at the time of the construction of the railway, because the Rhine had not yet been straightened in this area so the areas below the villages were still in the flood plain of the Rhine.

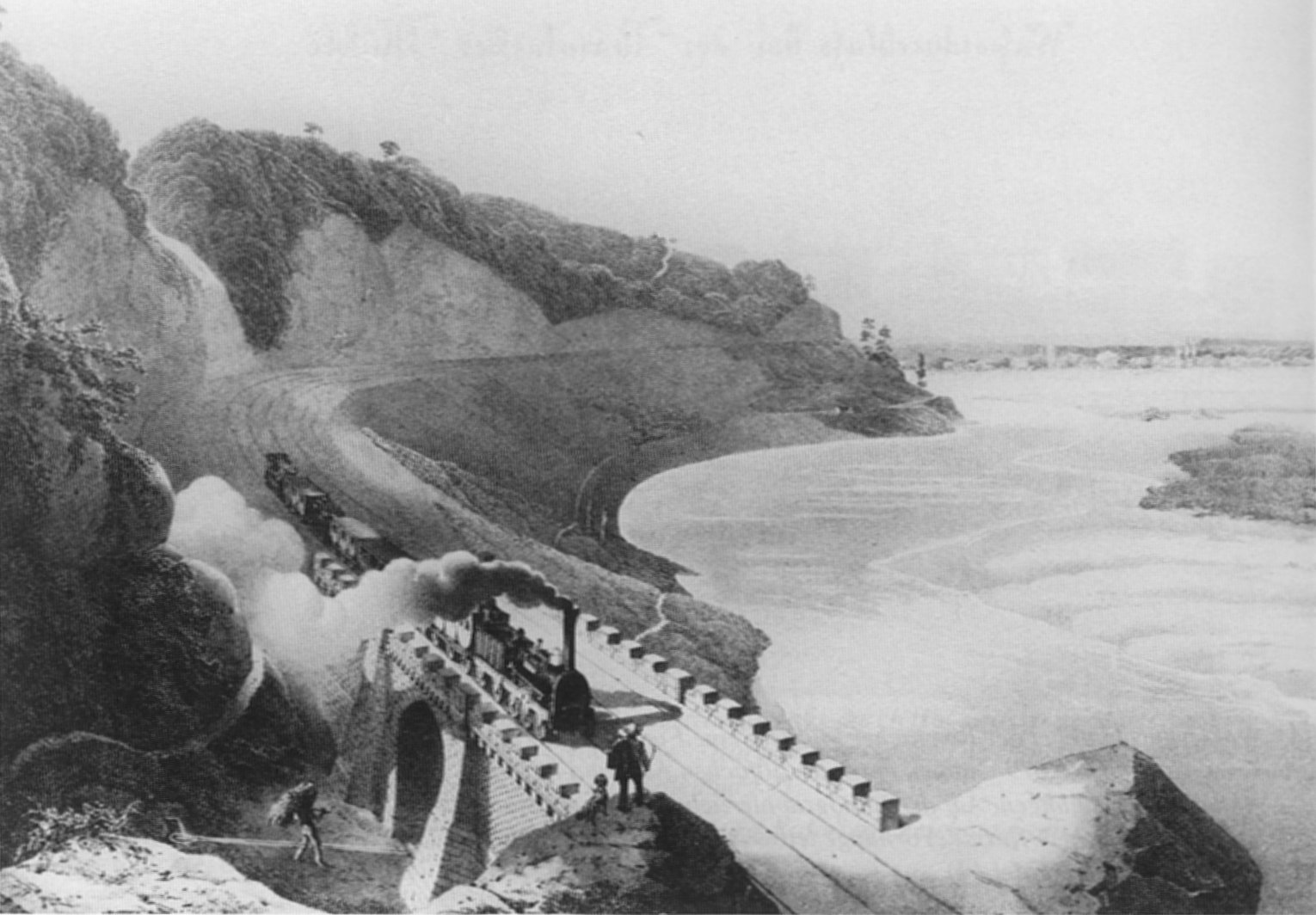
A train near Isteiner Klotz in the early years of rail operations

In 1895, another main line railway was opened between Karlsruhe and Rastatt next to the Baden main line, further to the west through Durmersheim. The reason for this was the demand of the German military for the construction of a second northern access to Strasbourg on the Graben-Neudorf–Karlsruhe–Rastatt–Rœschwoog route. Simultaneously this route relieved the Baden main line. In 1966, the Rastatt–Rœschwoog section was closed, but the section north of Rastatt continues to operate. During the construction phase of this strategic railway, Rastatt station was relocated and expanded.

Due to the strong growth in traffic, the larger railway stations had to be expanded in the early 20th century. So a new Karlsruhe freight bypass was completed in 1895 together with the extension of the Rhine Railway to Rastatt, allowing the main line through the Karlsruhe urban area to be relieved of freight trains. A new Karlsruhe station was opened in 1913. In 1911, Offenburg station was rebuilt and extended with a marshalling yard. The railway tracks in Basel were adapted for the increased traffic with a new freight yard in 1905 and a new passenger station and a new marshalling yard in 1913. The marshalling yard is partly on German and partly on Swiss territory. The railways of three counties cooperated in building extensive rail infrastructure in Basel connecting the Baden station for trains arriving from Germany to the Central station and the adjacent French station (part of SNCF since 1938). In addition to the marshalling yard at the Baden station, there is another, larger marshalling yard in Muttenz. The passenger trains on the Baden main line usually end at Basel Baden station, only the international trains continue through to Basel Central Station.

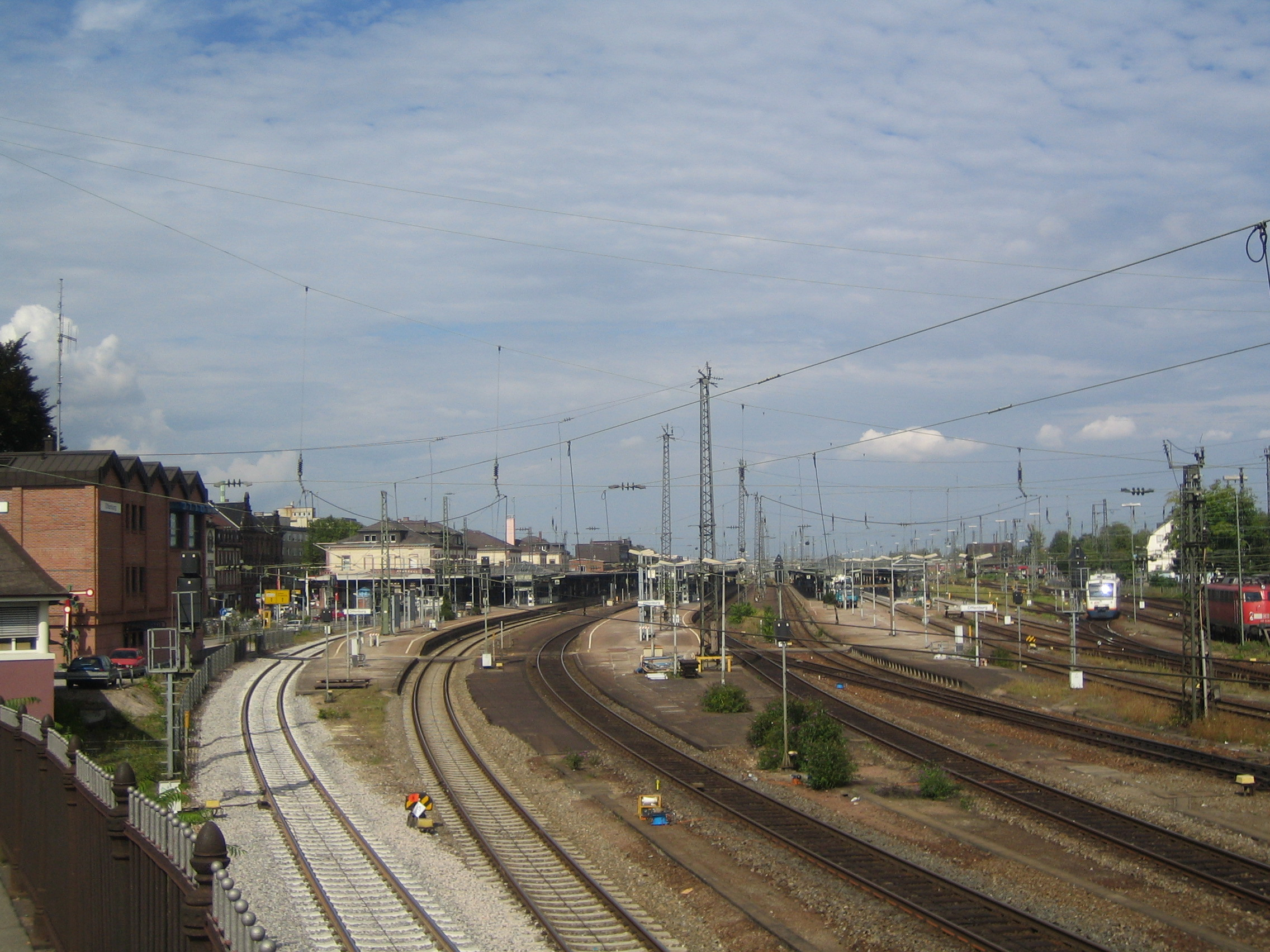
View of the tracks in Offenburg station, 2005

The importance of the line meant that it was duplicated between 1847 and 1855 and electrified between 1952 and 1957. The quadruplication of the tracks and the upgrading for a top speed of 250 km/h has been under way as part of the Karlsruhe–Basel new and upgraded line (Neu- und Ausbaustrecke Karlsruhe–Basel) project since the late 1980s.

In 1971 there was an accident at Rheinweiler when an express train that was running too fast on the twisty section between Efringen-Kirchen and Schliengen road was derailed and crashed down the railway embankment. 23 people were killed and 121 injured.

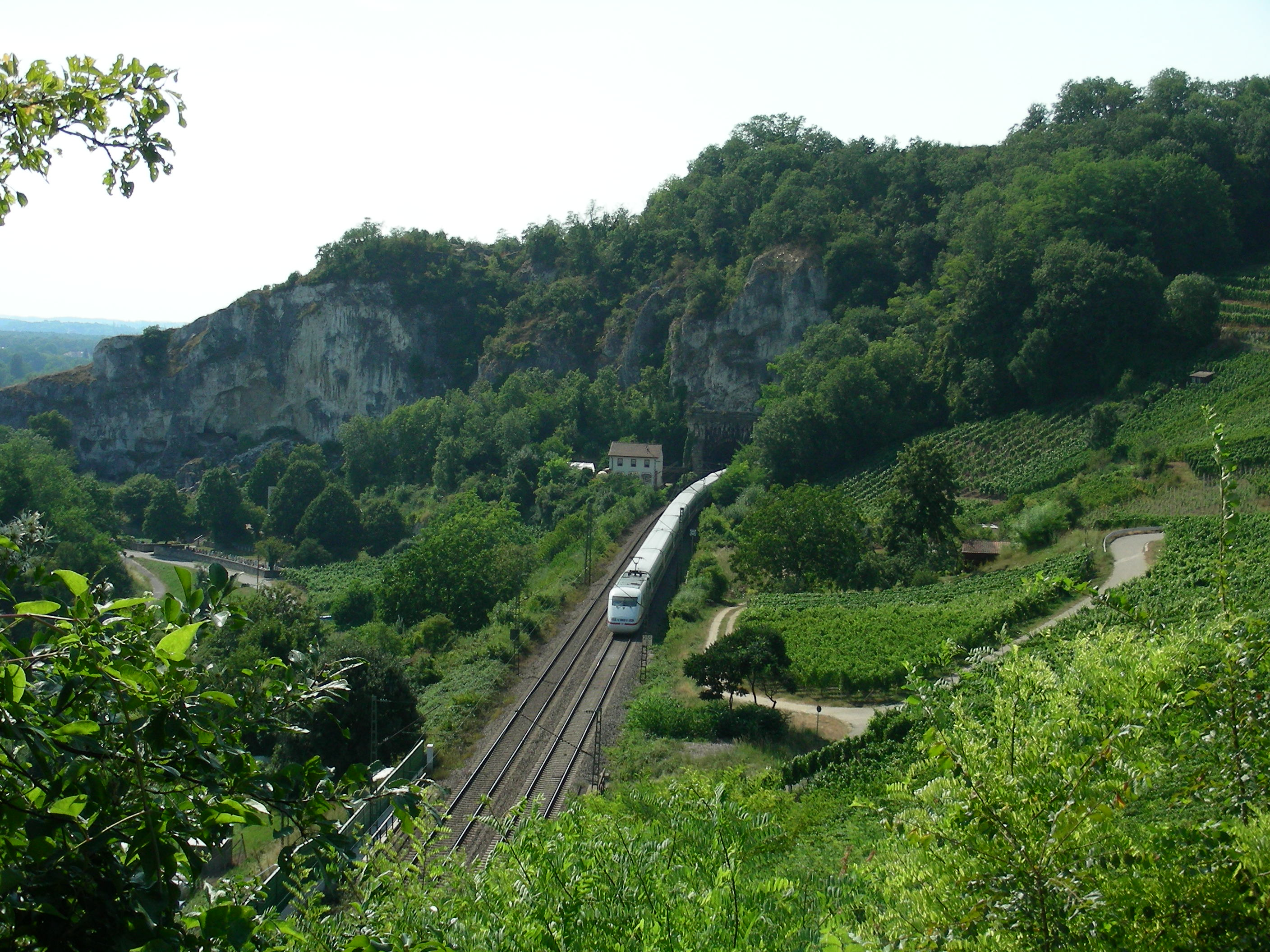
An ICE train before Isteiner Klotz, 2006

The traffic on the Rhine Valley line is notable for its international long-distance passenger and freight traffic. Every hour one or two IC, EuroCity (EC) or ICE services run. Three times daily TGV services also run from Stuttgart via Karlsruhe to Strasbourg. Local services runs at least hourly as Regionalbahn (stopping) and Regional-Express or Interregio-Express services. Albtal-Verkehrs-Gesellschaft also operates Karlsruhe Stadtbahn services between Karlsruhe and Achern. In the early 1980s, a series of stations were abandoned, especially between Rastatt and Offenburg. After the quadruplication of the line, Stadtbahn stations in Haueneberstein, Sinzheim, Steinbach (now Baden-Baden-Rebland) were put back into operation and a new station was established in Sinzheim Nord. Local services between Basel and Freiburg are to be integrated into the future Basel Regional S-Bahn network.

Freight transport is very extensive. In addition to Deutsche Bahn AG, Swiss Federal Railways operates one third of all freight trains on this route, especially as combined transport. Following the development of railway crossings across the Alps in Switzerland, a sharp increase in freight traffic on the Rhine Valley Railway is expected in Switzerland.

=== Basel–Konstanz ===
The Upper Rhine line runs from Basel initially on the right bank of the Rhine to Waldshut, where it leaves the Rhine valley and crosses the northern Klettgau to Schaffhausen and it then runs through southern Hegau to Radolfzell on the Untersee. The railway then follows the banks of the Untersee to Konstanz, where it crosses a bridge over the Rhine. The terminus of the Baden main line at Konstanz station is on the left (south) bank of the Rhine between the old town of Konstanz and the harbour. The line is continued by two curves connecting to Kreuzlingen and Kreuzlingen Hafen, but the latter is currently only used for freight.

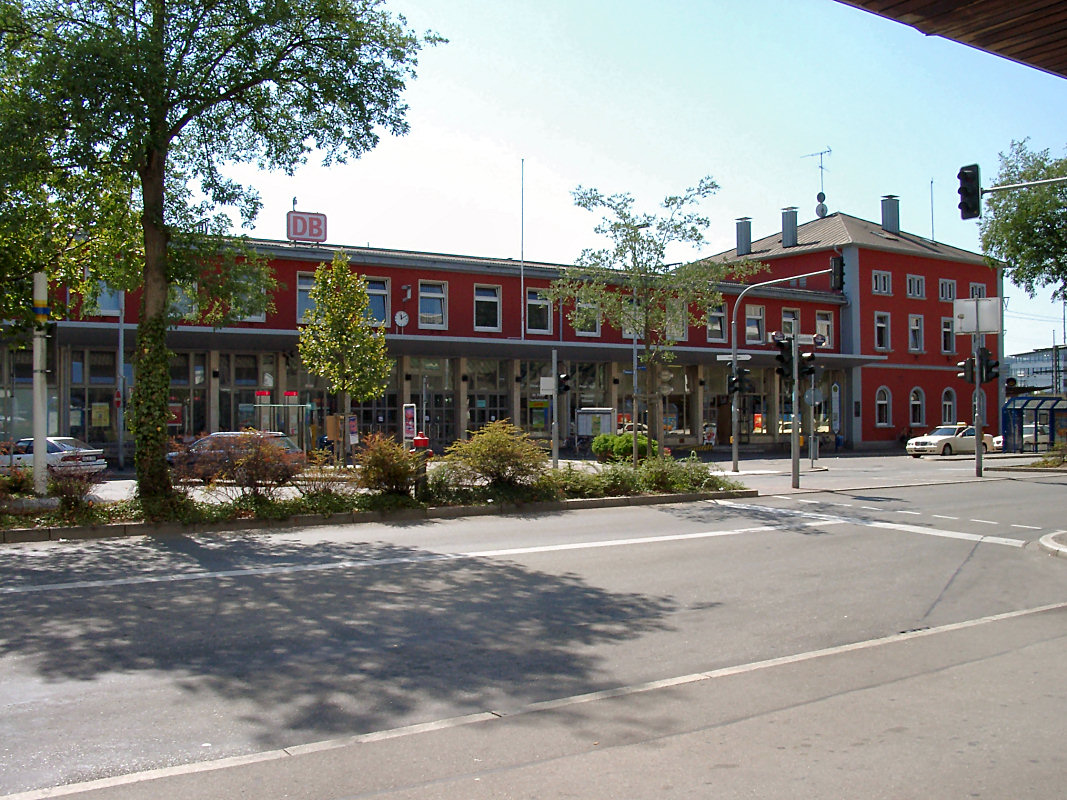
Singen station

The line between Basel and Waldshut was duplicated during the 1980s, with the exception of the Laufenburg–Laufenburg-Ost section. There is also double track line between Beringen and Konstanz-Petershausen, the other sections are single track. The section of the High Rhine Railway between Konstanz and Singen was electrified as part of the electrification of the Black Forest Railway to Singen in 1977. The gap between Singen and Schaffhausen was electrified in 1990.

In Basel and between Erzingen and Thayngen the line runs through the Swiss cantons of Basel and Schaffhausen. Construction and operation of these routes is governed by an international treaty between Switzerland and Baden and later Germany. It treats the operation of the line as a "single continuous main line". Thus it was possible for the Baden State Railways to operate through the fringes of Switzerland in the same way as on Baden territory, which was not normal at that time. Switzerland agreed not to impose tariffs on freight in transit or to subject trains on the line to customs formalities. The treaty of 1852 also makes a provision for Switzerland to acquire the line, but Switzerland has never used this provision. The tracks in Switzerland largely are operated under German regulations, so that the trains run on the right and the tracks are—with the exception of Schaffhausen station—controlled by signals of German design.

The availability of the line was not assured in case of war. Therefore, the military sought the creation of bypasses around the two sections running through Switzerland so that there would be to a secure east–west supply route through southern Baden during wartime. So three strategic railways were built up to 1890 between Weil am Rhein and Lörrach (Weil am Rhein–Lörrach railway), Schopfheim and Bad Säckingen (the Wehra Valley Railway) and between Lauchringen and Hintschingen (the Wutach Valley Railway). This line ran from Ulm via the Ulm–Sigmaringen railway, the Tuttlingen–Inzigkofen railway, the Wutach Valley Railway, the High Rhine Railway to Alsace without touching Swiss territory. The strategic railways were virtually useless for civilian traffic. Therefore, passenger traffic on the Wehra Valley Railway and the Wutach Valley Railway were already closed in 1971. Only the short link between Lörrach and Weil is still operated; it has recently become part of the Basel Regional S-Bahn.

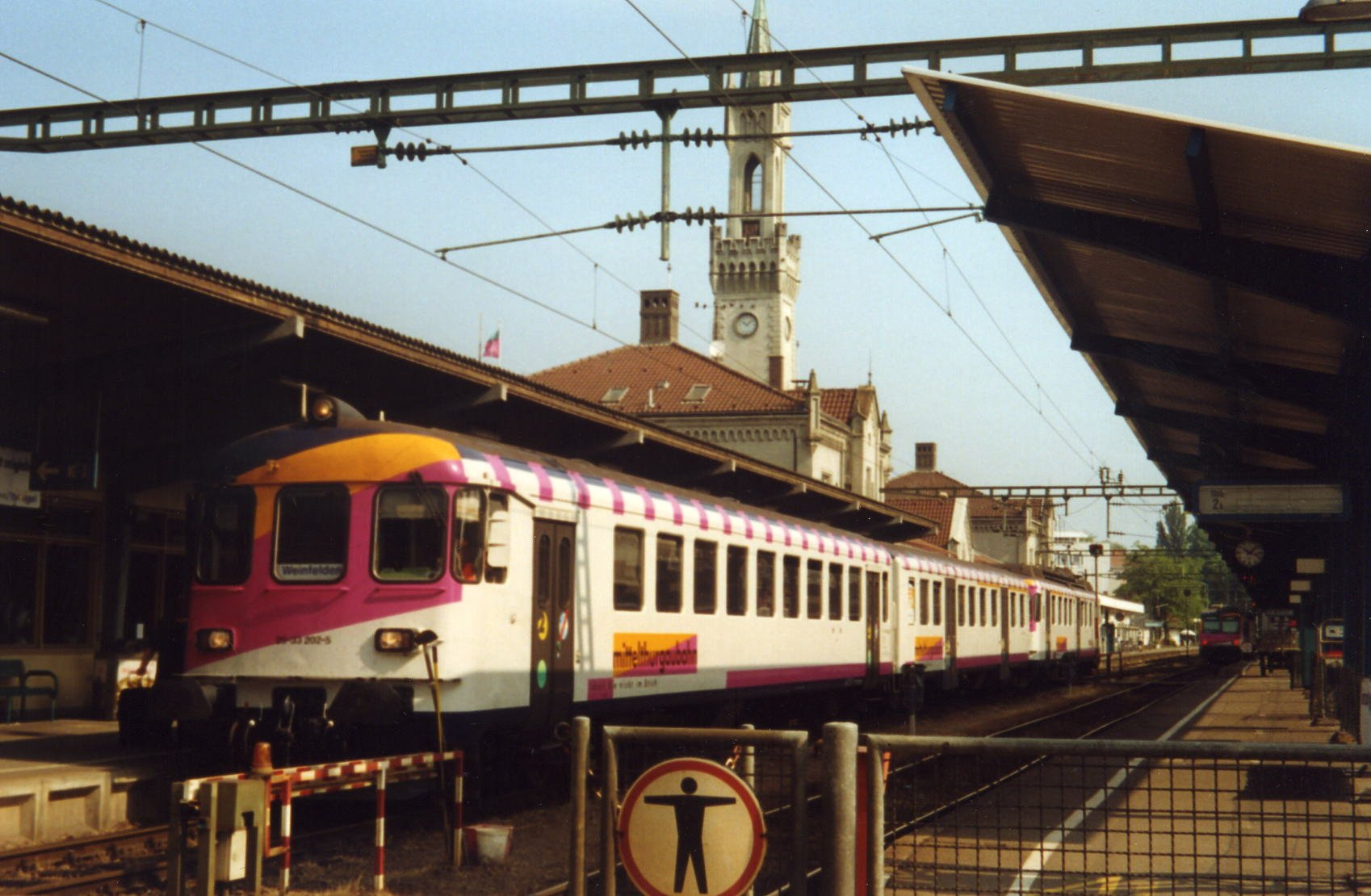
Seehas set in Konstanz station, 2001

The line is now served by regional services. Hourly Interregio-Express services are operated with tilting technology using class 611 multiple units between Basel and Singen, complemented by Regionalbahn services on some sections. An S-Bahn-like service has been operated with electric multiple units between Konstanz and Engen via Singen under the name of Seehas (named after a mythical lake hare) since 1994. The operator of the service was the Swiss company Mittelthurgau-Bahn until it became bankrupt in 2003, when its activities were taken over by THURBO. It is planned that the service between Basel and Waldshut will become part of the Basel S-Bahn system. Between Singen and Schaffhausen services are operate by long-distance Intercity trains on the Zurich–Stuttgart route every two hours.

== Sources ==
- Karl Müller (1904). Die badischen Eisenbahnen in historisch-statistischer Darstellung (in German). Heidelberg: Heidelberger Verlagsanstalt und Druckerei.
- Albert Kuntzemüller (1953). Die Badischen Eisenbahnen (in German). Karlsruhe: Verlag G. Braun.
- Rainer Gerber (1981). 125 Jahre Basel-Waldshut: Jubiläum der Eisenbahn am Hochrhein, 1981 (in German). Freiburg: Eisenbahn-Kurier Verlag.
- Fridolin Schell (1982). 110 Jahre Eisenbahndirektion Karlsruhe (in German). Freiburg: Eisenbahn-Kurier Verlag.
- Wolfgang von Hippel; Joachim Stephan; Peter Gleiber; Hans-Jürgen Enzweiler (1990). Eisenbahn-Fieber: Badens Aufbruch ins Eisenbahnzeitalter (in German). Ubstadt-Weiher: verlag regionalkultur.
- Hans Wolfgang Scharf (1993). Die Eisenbahn am Hochrhein, volume 1: Von Basel zum Bodensee 1840–1939 (in German). Freiburg: Eisenbahn-Kurier Verlag.
- Hans Wolfgang Scharf (1993). Die Eisenbahn am Hochrhein, volume 2: Von Basel zum Bodensee 1939–1992 (in German). Freiburg: Eisenbahn-Kurier Verlag.
- Werner Schreiner, ed. (2004). ...an einem Strang: Eisenbahngeschichte im Rhein-Neckar-Dreieck (in German). Ludwigshafen am Rhein: Pro Message. ISBN 3-934845-17-7.
