= Wyhlen station =

Railway station in Wyhlen, Germany

Wyhlen
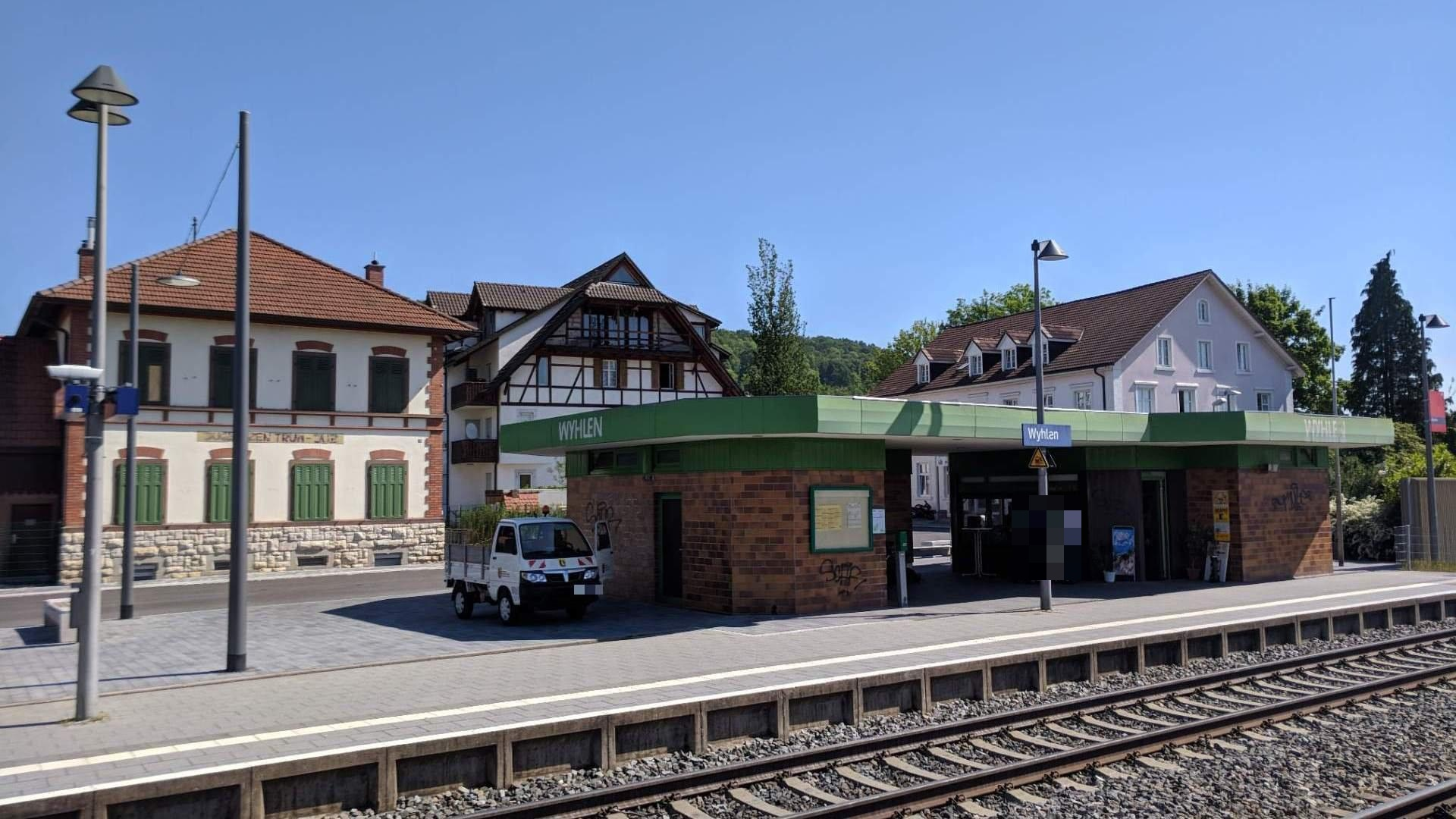
- The station in 2018

General information
- Location: Grenzach-Wyhlen, Baden-Württemberg; Germany
- Coordinates: 47°32′47″N 7°41′27″E
- Owner: Deutsche Bahn
- Lines: High Rhine Railway (KBS 730)
- Distance: 278.0 km (172.7 mi) from Mannheim Hauptbahnhof
- Platforms: 2 side platforms
- Tracks: 2
- Train operators: DB Regio Baden-Württemberg
- Connections: Südbadenbus bus lines

Other information
- Fare zone: 2 (RVL)

Services
Preceding station	Basel S-Bahn	Following station
Grenzach towards Basel Bad Bf	RB30	Herten (Baden) towards Lauchringen
Location

Wyhlen station (German: Bahnhof Wyhlen) is a railway station in the town of Grenzach-Wyhlen, Baden-Württemberg, Germany. The station lies on the High Rhine Railway and the train services are operated by Deutsche Bahn.

== Services ==
As of the December 2023 timetable change, the following services stop at Wyhlen:

Connection	Line	Frequency	Operator
RB 3	Basel Bad Bf – Whylen – Bad Säckingen – Schaffhausen – Singen – Überlingen – Friedrichshafen Stadt	individual services	DB Regio Baden-Württemberg
RB30	Basel Bad Bf – Whylen – Laufenburg – Waldshut – Lauchringen (– Erzingen)	30 min	DB Regio Baden-Württemberg
