= Schwörstadt station =

Railway station in Schwörstadt, Germany

Schwörstadt
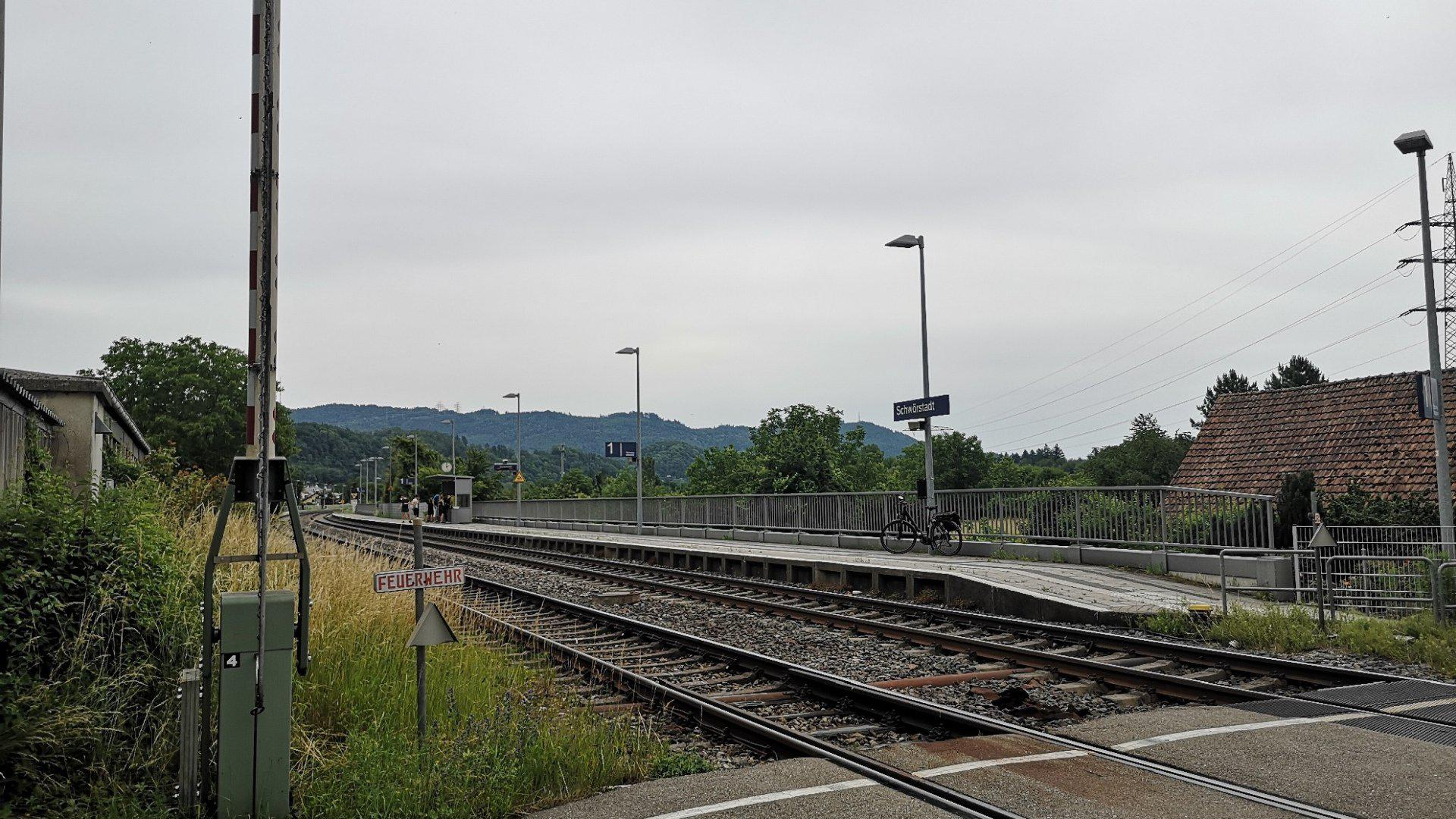
- The station platform in 2019

General information
- Location: Schwörstadt, Baden-Württemberg; Germany
- Coordinates: 47°35′28″N 7°52′13″E
- Owner: Deutsche Bahn
- Lines: High Rhine Railway (KBS 730)
- Distance: 293.8 km (182.6 mi) from Mannheim Hbf
- Platforms: 2 side platforms
- Tracks: 2
- Train operators: DB Regio Baden-Württemberg

Other information
- Fare zone: 2 (RVL)

Services
Preceding station	Basel S-Bahn	Following station
Beuggen towards Basel Bad Bf	RB30	Wehr-Brennet towards Lauchringen
Location

Schwörstadt station (German: Bahnhof Schwörstadt) is a railway station in the town of Schwörstadt, Baden-Württemberg, Germany. The station lies on the High Rhine Railway and the train services are operated by Deutsche Bahn.

== Services ==
As of the December 2023 timetable change, the following services stop at Schwörstadt:

Connection	Line	Frequency	Operator
RB 3	Basel Bad Bf – Schwörstadt – Bad Säckingen – Schaffhausen – Singen – Überlingen – Friedrichshafen Stadt	individual services	DB Regio Baden-Württemberg
RB30	Basel Bad Bf – Schwörstadt – Laufenburg – Waldshut – Lauchringen (– Erzingen)	30 min	DB Regio Baden-Württemberg
