= Beuggen station =

Railway station in Rheinfelden (Baden), Germany

Beuggen
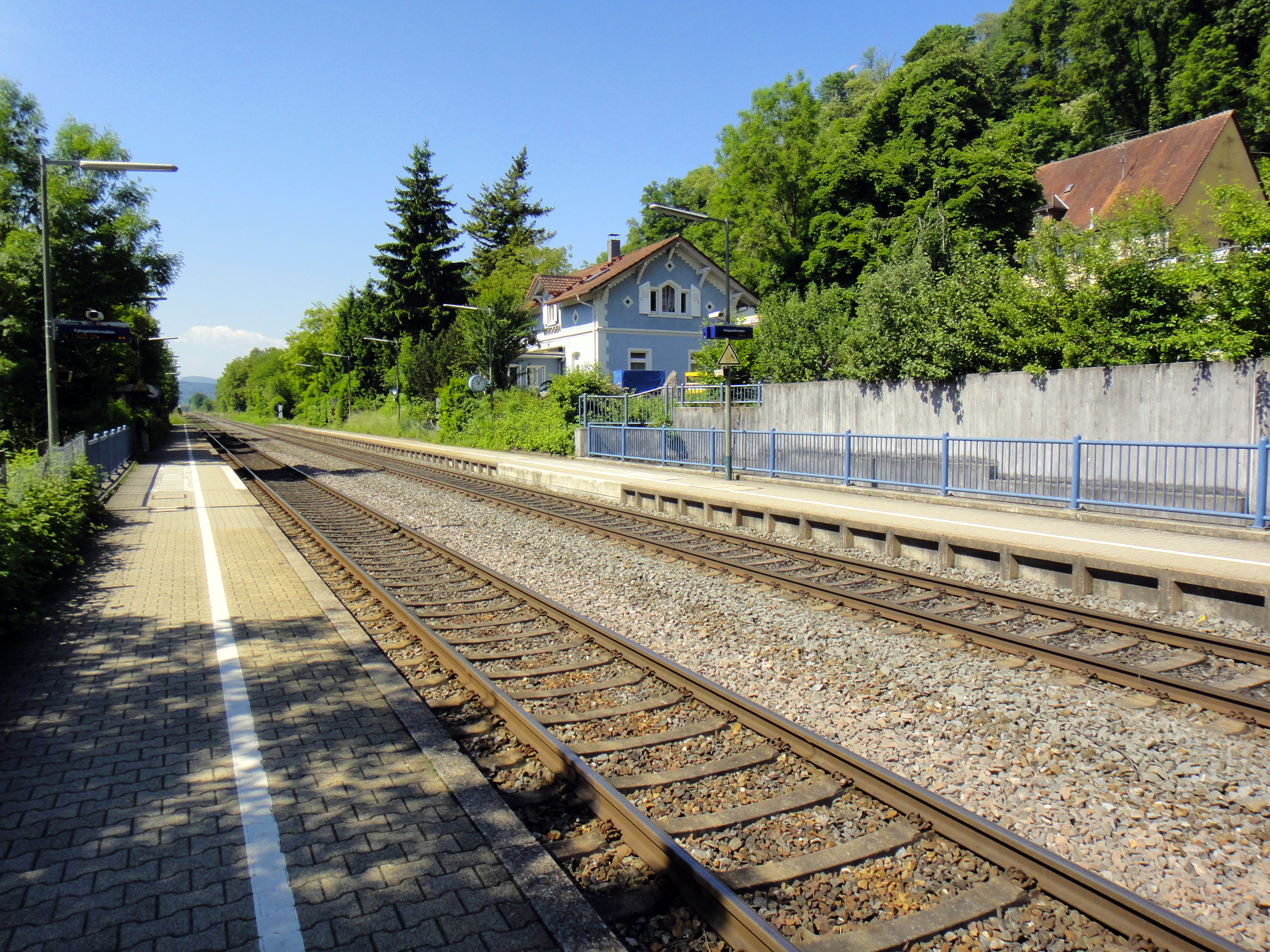
- The station platforms in 2013

General information
- Location: Rheinfelden, Baden-Württemberg; Germany
- Coordinates: 47°34′55″N 7°48′39″E
- Owner: Deutsche Bahn
- Lines: High Rhine Railway (KBS 730)
- Distance: 288.8 km (179.5 mi) from Mannheim Hbf
- Platforms: 2 side platforms
- Tracks: 2
- Train operators: DB Regio Baden-Württemberg
- Connections: Südbadenbus bus lines

Other information
- Fare zone: 2 (RVL)

Services
Preceding station	Basel S-Bahn	Following station
Rheinfelden (Baden) towards Basel Bad Bf	RB30	Schwörstadt towards Lauchringen
Location

Beuggen station (German: Bahnhof Beuggen) is a railway station in the town of Beuggen, Baden-Württemberg, Germany. The station lies on the High Rhine Railway and the train services are operated by Deutsche Bahn.

== Services ==
As of the December 2023 timetable change, the following services stop at Beuggen:

Connection	Line	Frequency	Operator
RB 3	Basel Bad Bf – Beuggen – Bad Säckingen – Schaffhausen – Singen – Überlingen – Friedrichshafen Stadt	individual services	DB Regio Baden-Württemberg
RB30	Basel Bad Bf – Rheinfelden (Baden) – Beuggen – Laufenburg – Waldshut – Lauchringen (– Erzingen)	30 min	DB Regio Baden-Württemberg
