= Wehr-Brennet station =

Railway station in Wehr, Germany

Wehr-Brennet
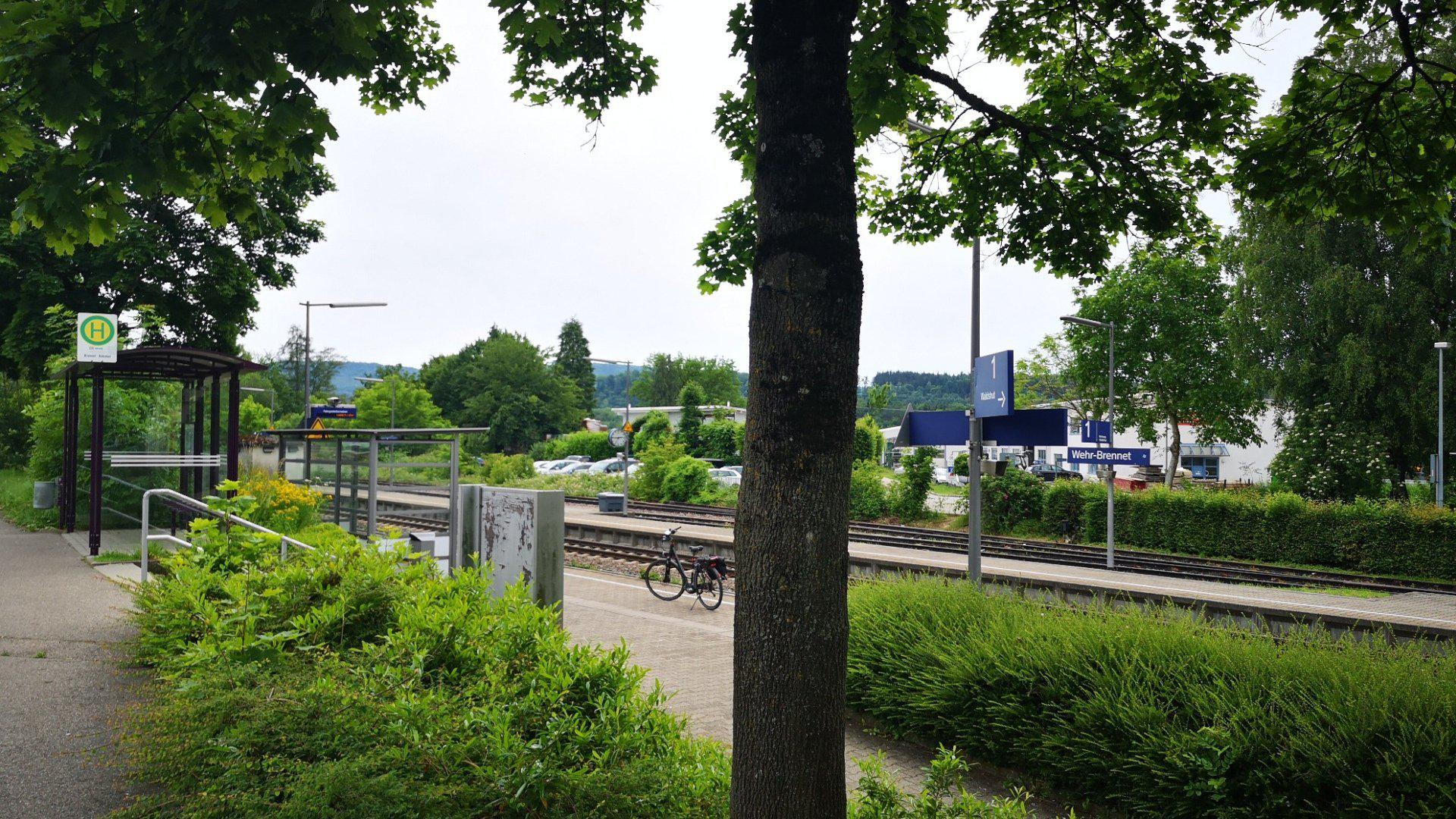
- The station platforms in 2019

General information
- Location: Wehr, Baden-Württemberg; Germany
- Coordinates: 47°34′51″N 7°54′38″E
- Owner: Deutsche Bahn
- Lines: High Rhine Railway (KBS 730)
- Distance: 297.1 km (184.6 mi) from Mannheim Hauptbahnhof
- Platforms: 1 side platform; 1 island platform
- Tracks: 3
- Train operators: DB Regio Baden-Württemberg
- Connections: Südbadenbus bus lines

Other information
- Fare zone: 1 (WTV)

Services
| Preceding station | Basel S-Bahn | Following station |
|---|---|---|
| Schwörstadt towards Basel Bad Bf | RB30 | Bad Säckingen towards Lauchringen |
Location

Wehr-Brennet station (German: Bahnhof Wehr-Brennet) is a railway station in the town of Brennet, Baden-Württemberg, Germany. The station lies on the High Rhine Railway and the train services are operated by Deutsche Bahn.

== Services ==
As of the December 2023 timetable change, the following services stop at Wehr-Brennet:

| Connection | Line | Frequency | Operator |
|---|---|---|---|
| RB 3 | Basel Bad Bf – Wehr-Brennet – Bad Säckingen – Schaffhausen – Singen – Überlingen – Friedrichshafen Stadt | individual services | DB Regio Baden-Württemberg |
| RB30 | Basel Bad Bf – Wehr-Brennet – Laufenburg – Waldshut – Lauchringen (– Erzingen) | 30 min | DB Regio Baden-Württemberg |
