= Murg (Baden) station =

Railway station in Murg, Germany

Murg (Baden)
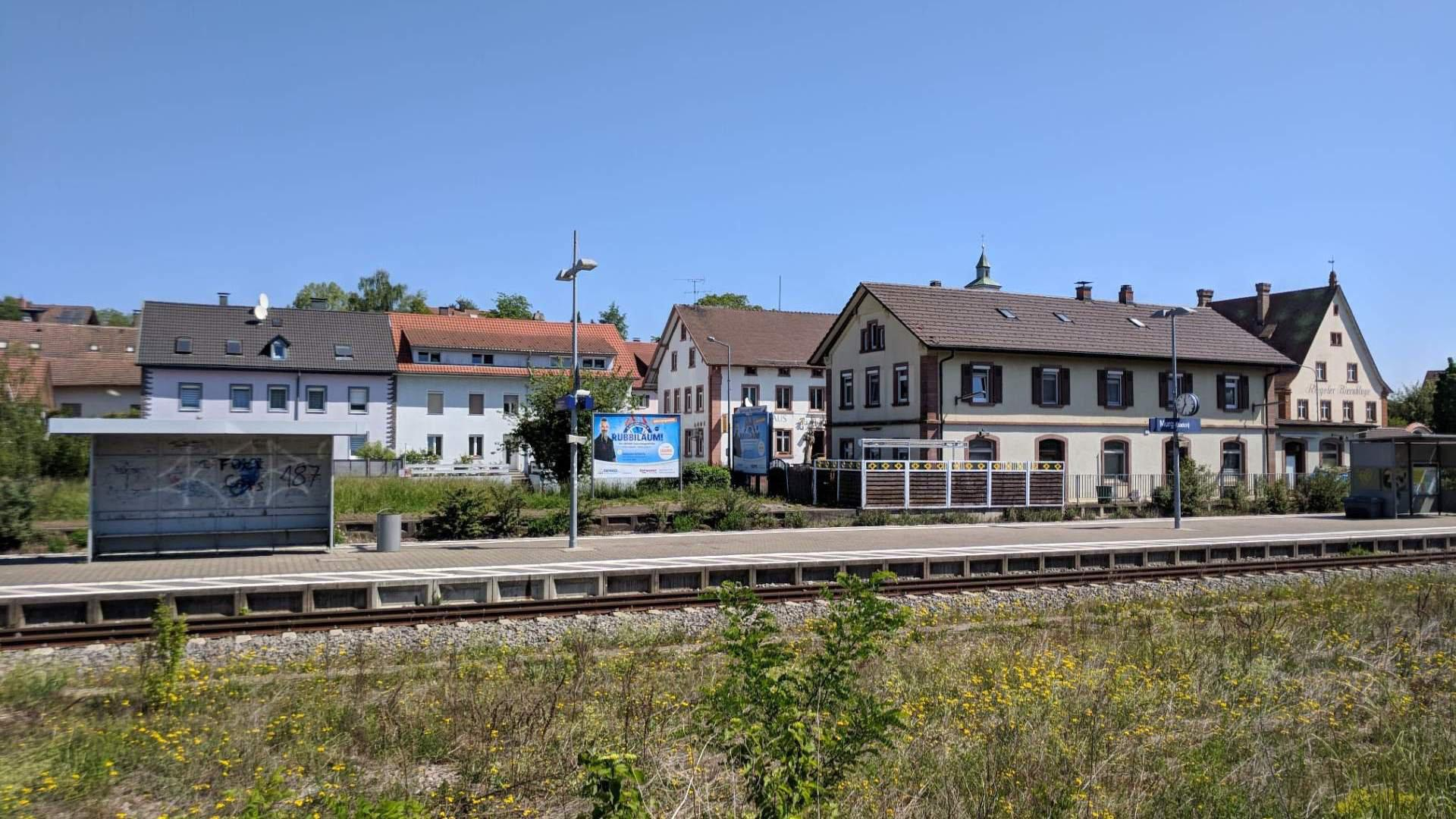
- The station platforms in 2018

General information
- Location: Murg, Baden-Württemberg; Germany
- Coordinates: 47°33′12″N 8°01′07″E
- Owner: Deutsche Bahn
- Lines: High Rhine Railway (KBS 730)
- Distance: 307.9 km (191.3 mi) from Mannheim Hauptbahnhof
- Platforms: 1 island platform
- Tracks: 2
- Train operators: DB Regio Baden-Württemberg
- Connections: Südbadenbus bus lines

Other information
- Fare zone: 1 (WTV)

Services
Preceding station	Basel S-Bahn	Following station
Bad Säckingen towards Basel Bad Bf	RB30	Laufenburg (Baden) towards Lauchringen
Location

Murg (Baden) station (German: Bahnhof Murg (Baden)) is a railway station in the town of Murg (Baden), Baden-Württemberg, Germany. The station lies on the High Rhine Railway and the train services are operated by Deutsche Bahn.

== Services ==
As of the December 2023 timetable change, the following services stop at Murg (Baden):

Connection	Line	Frequency	Operator
RB 3	Basel Bad Bf – Rheinfelden (Baden) – Murg (Baden) – Bad Säckingen – Schaffhausen – Singen – Überlingen – Friedrichshafen Stadt	individual services	DB Regio Baden-Württemberg
RB30	Basel Bad Bf – Rheinfelden (Baden) – Murg (Baden) – Laufenburg – Waldshut – Lauchringen (– Erzingen)	30 min	DB Regio Baden-Württemberg
