= Murg station =

Murg station could refer to:

- Murg (Baden) station in Murg, Baden-Württemberg, Germany
- Murg railway station in Quarten, Switzerland
