= Rheinfelden (Baden) station =

Railway station in Baden-Württemberg on the High Rhine

Rheinfelden (Baden)
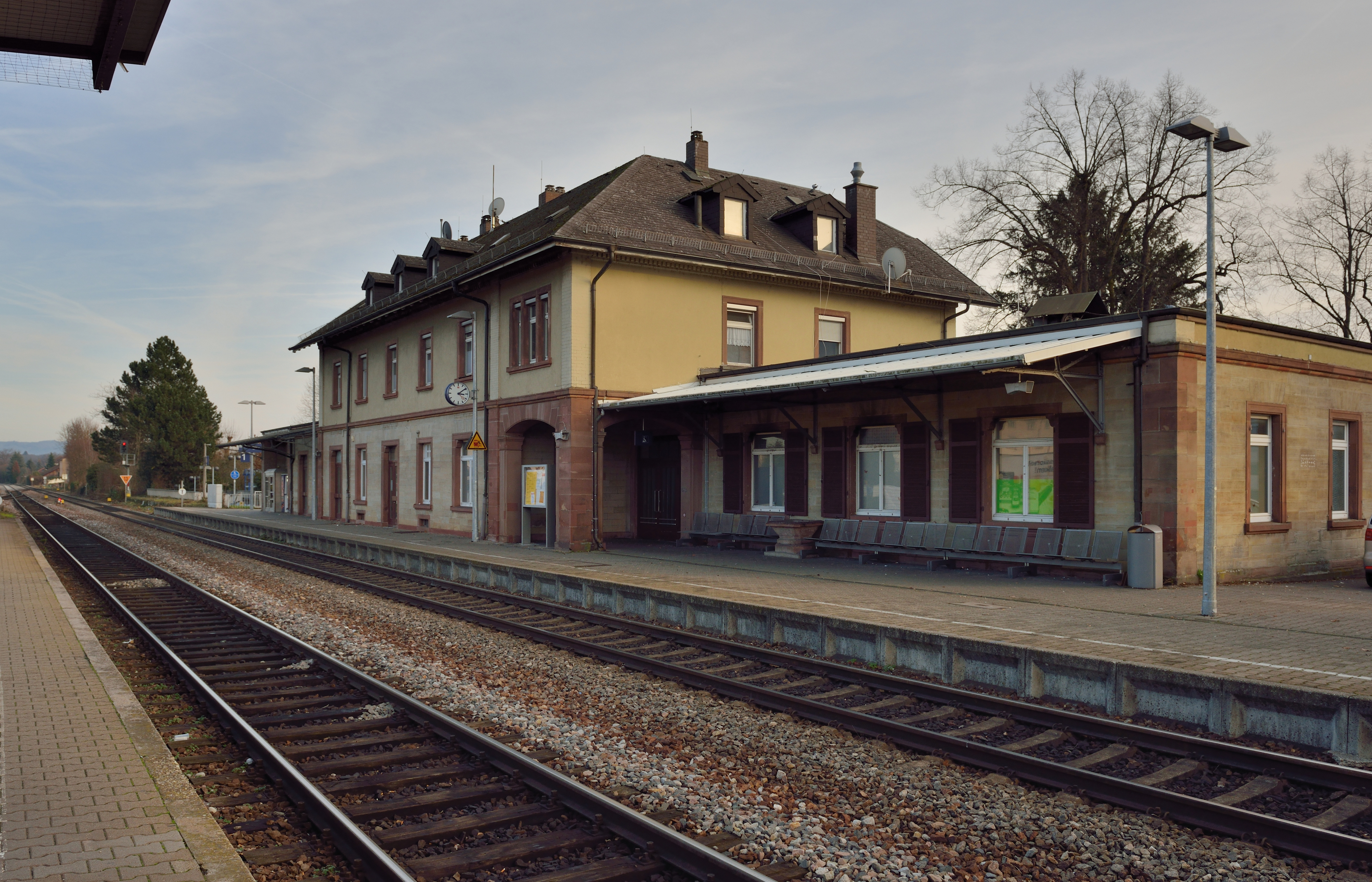
- The station in 2015

General information
- Location: Bahnhofplatz 4 Rheinfelden, Baden-Württemberg; Germany
- Coordinates: 47°33′25″N 7°47′03″E
- Elevation: 280 m (920 ft)
- Owner: DB Netz
- Operator: DB Station&Service
- Lines: High Rhine Railway (KBS 730)
- Distance: 285.2 km (177.2 mi) from Mannheim Hauptbahnhof
- Platforms: 1 side platform; 1 island platform
- Tracks: 3
- Train operators: DB Regio Baden-Württemberg
- Connections: Südbadenbus bus lines

Other information
- Station code: 5252
- DS100 code: RRH
- IBNR: 8005064
- Category: 4
- Fare zone: 2 (RVL)

History
- Opened: 1 August 1856

Services
Preceding station	DB Regio Baden-Württemberg	Following station
Basel Bad Bf Terminus	RE 3	Bad Säckingen towards Friedrichshafen Hafen
Preceding station	Basel S-Bahn	Following station
Herten (Baden) towards Basel Bad Bf	RB30	Beuggen towards Lauchringen
Location

Rheinfelden (Baden) station (German: Bahnhof Rheinfelden (Baden)) is a railway station in the town of Rheinfelden, Baden-Württemberg, Germany. The station lies on the High Rhine Railway and the train services are operated by Deutsche Bahn.

== Services ==
As of the December 2023 timetable change, the following services stop at Rheinfelden (Baden):

Connection	Line	Frequency	Operator
RE 3	Basel Bad Bf – Rheinfelden (Baden) – Schaffhausen – Überlingen – Friedrichshafen Hafen	60 min	DB Regio Baden-Württemberg
RB 3	Basel Bad Bf – Rheinfelden (Baden) – Bad Säckingen – Schaffhausen – Singen – Überlingen – Friedrichshafen Stadt	individual services	DB Regio Baden-Württemberg
RB30	Basel Bad Bf – Herten (Baden) – Rheinfelden (Baden) – Laufenburg – Waldshut – Lauchringen (– Erzingen)	30 min	DB Regio Baden-Württemberg
