= Laufenburg station =

Laufenburg station could refer to:

- Laufenburg (Baden) station in Laufenburg, Baden-Württemberg, Germany
- Laufenburg railway station (Switzerland) in Laufenburg, Aargau, Switzerland
