= Laufenburg (Baden) Ost station =

Railway station in Laufenburg (Baden), Germany

Laufenburg (Baden) Ost
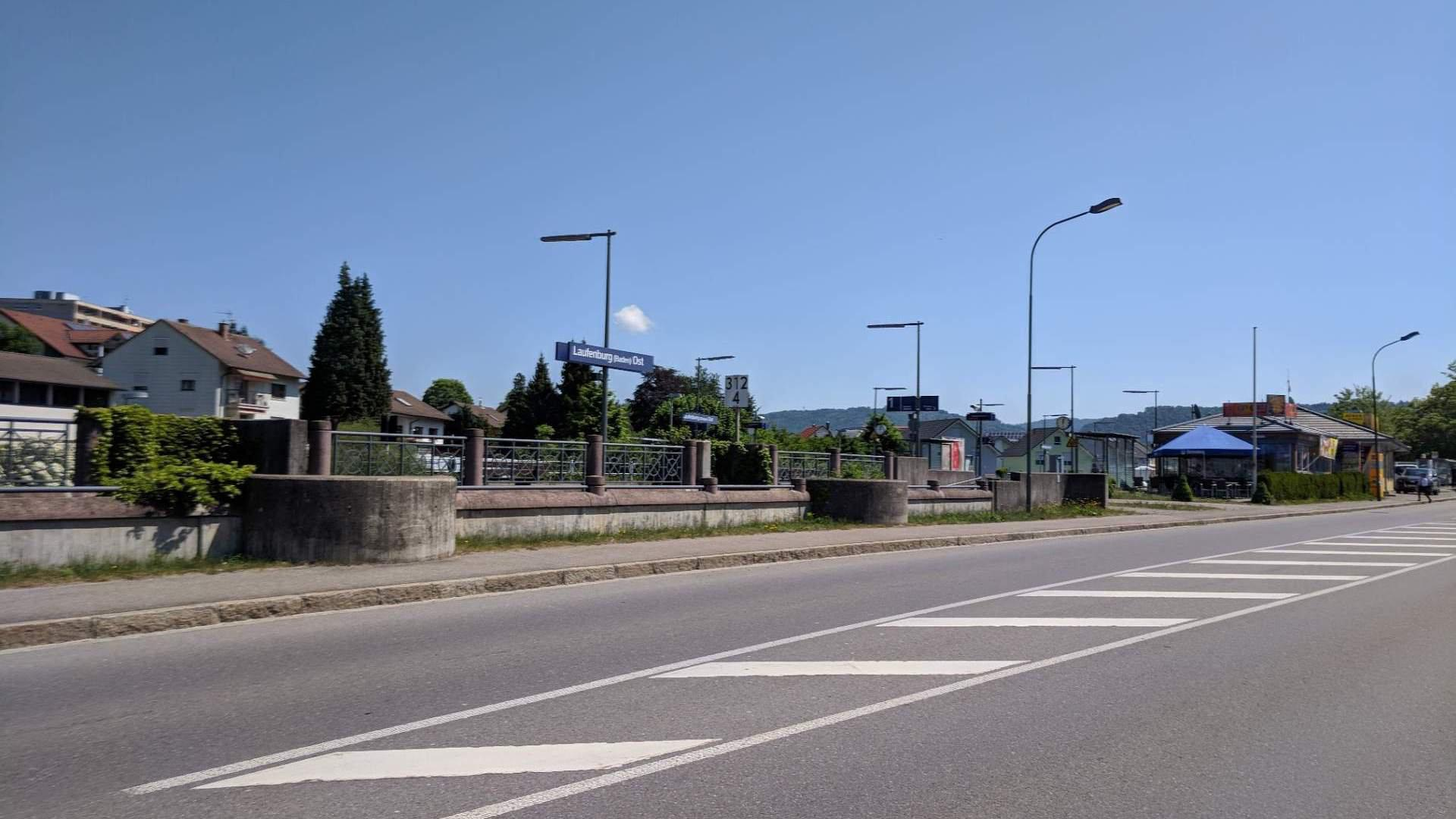
- The station in 2018

General information
- Location: Laufenburg, Baden-Württemberg; Germany
- Coordinates: 47°33′58″N 8°04′25″E
- Owner: Deutsche Bahn
- Lines: High Rhine Railway (KBS 730)
- Distance: 312.5 km (194.2 mi) from Mannheim Hauptbahnhof
- Platforms: 2 side platforms
- Tracks: 2
- Train operators: DB Regio Baden-Württemberg
- Connections: Südbadenbus bus lines

Other information
- Fare zone: 1 (WTV)

Services
Preceding station	Basel S-Bahn	Following station
Laufenburg (Baden) towards Basel Bad Bf	RB30	Albbruck towards Lauchringen
Location

Laufenburg (Baden) Ost station (German: Bahnhof Laufenburg (Baden) Ost) is a railway station in the town of Laufenburg (Baden), Baden-Württemberg, Germany. The station lies on the High Rhine Railway. The train services are operated by Deutsche Bahn.

== Services ==
As of the December 2023 timetable change, the following services stop at Laufenburg (Baden) Ost:

- Basel S-Bahn: RB30 hourly service between Basel Bad Bf and Lauchringen, supplemented by hourly weekday service in the afternoons between Basel and Waldshut.
