= Wehra Valley Railway =

Railway line in Germany

Technical
- Line length: 19.7 km (12.2 mi)
- Track gauge: 1,435 mm (4 ft 8 1/2 in)
- Electrification: AC overhead 15 kV/15 Hz (1913-1936); 15 kV/16.7 Hz (1936-1977)

The Wehra Valley Railway (German: Wehratalbahn) was a 19.7 km long branch line from Schopfheim to Bad Säckingen in southwestern Germany, that was electrified in 1913 at the same time as the Wiesen Valley Railway. For part of its length it followed the river of the same name. The line runs through the Fahrnau Tunnel (Fahrnauer Tunnel) which, at that time, was one of the longest railway tunnels (3.169 km) in Germany. The Wehra Valley Railway was intended as a strategic railway circumnavigating Switzerland near Basel and was laid ready to take a second track.

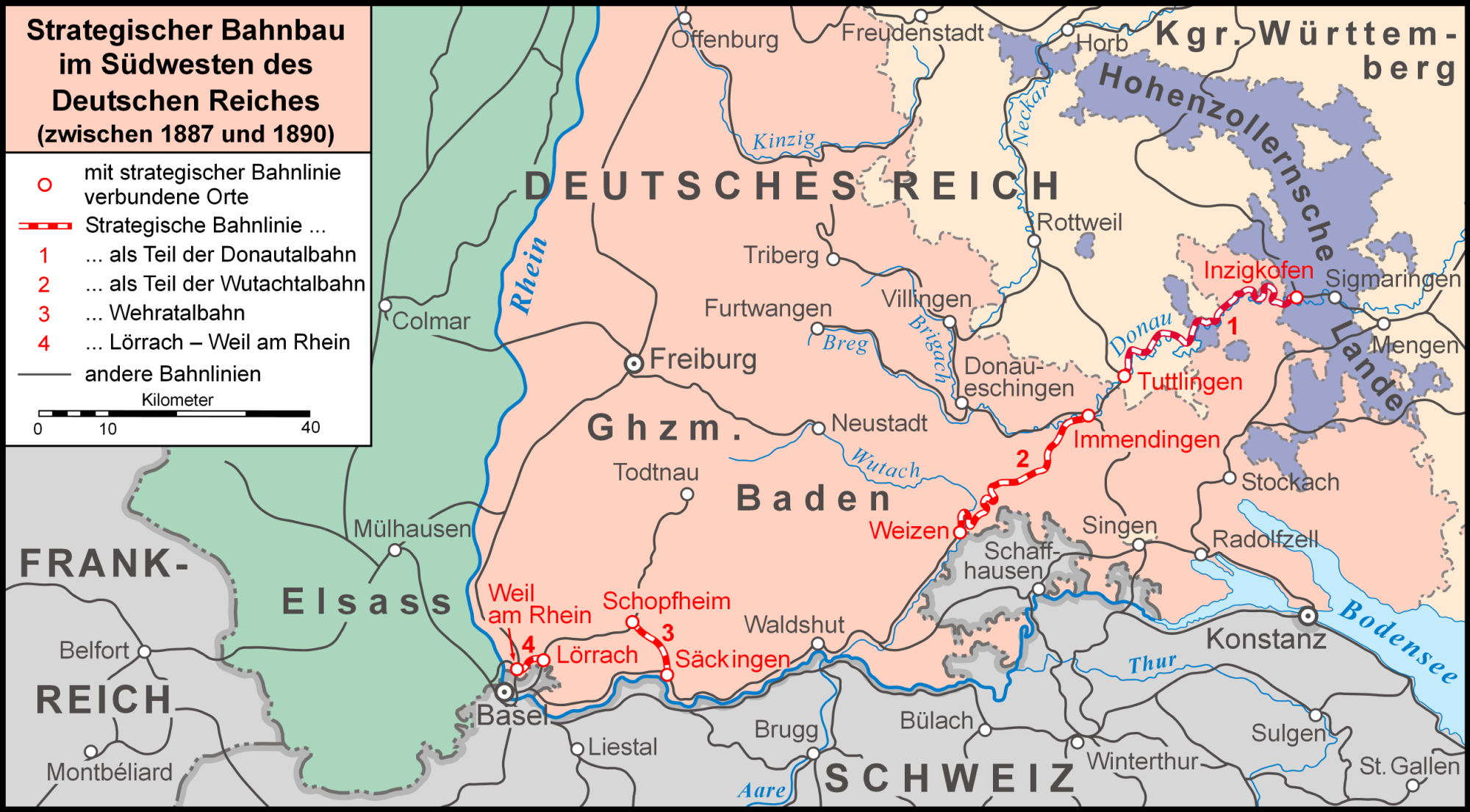
The Wehra Valley Railway as part of the construction of strategic railways in the German Empire between 1887 and 1890

Passenger services were withdrawn from the line on 23 May 1971. Goods traffic between Bad Säckingen and Wehr continued to run until 1 September 1990. On 31 December 1994 the line was closed.

In a local council meeting on 19 April 2005, the town of Wehr (Baden) called for an expert opinion to determine whether the line could be reactivated. The report from Tübingen-based local transport advisor Ulrich Grosse was positive, although its restoration would be relatively expensive and only possible for a short time. Initially the route will be protected from being built on. Currently checks are being carried out to see whether the Fahrnau Tunnel can be reopened.

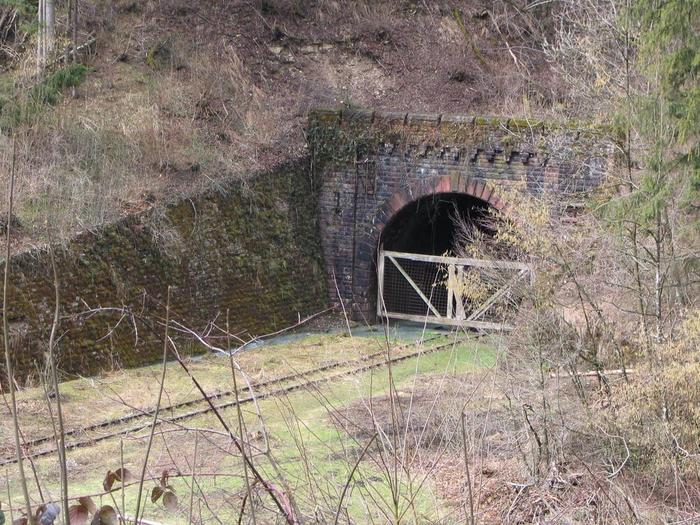
Eastern entrance of the Fahrnau Tunnel in Hasel
