= Bad Säckingen station =

Railway station in Bad Säckingen, Germany

Bad Säckingen
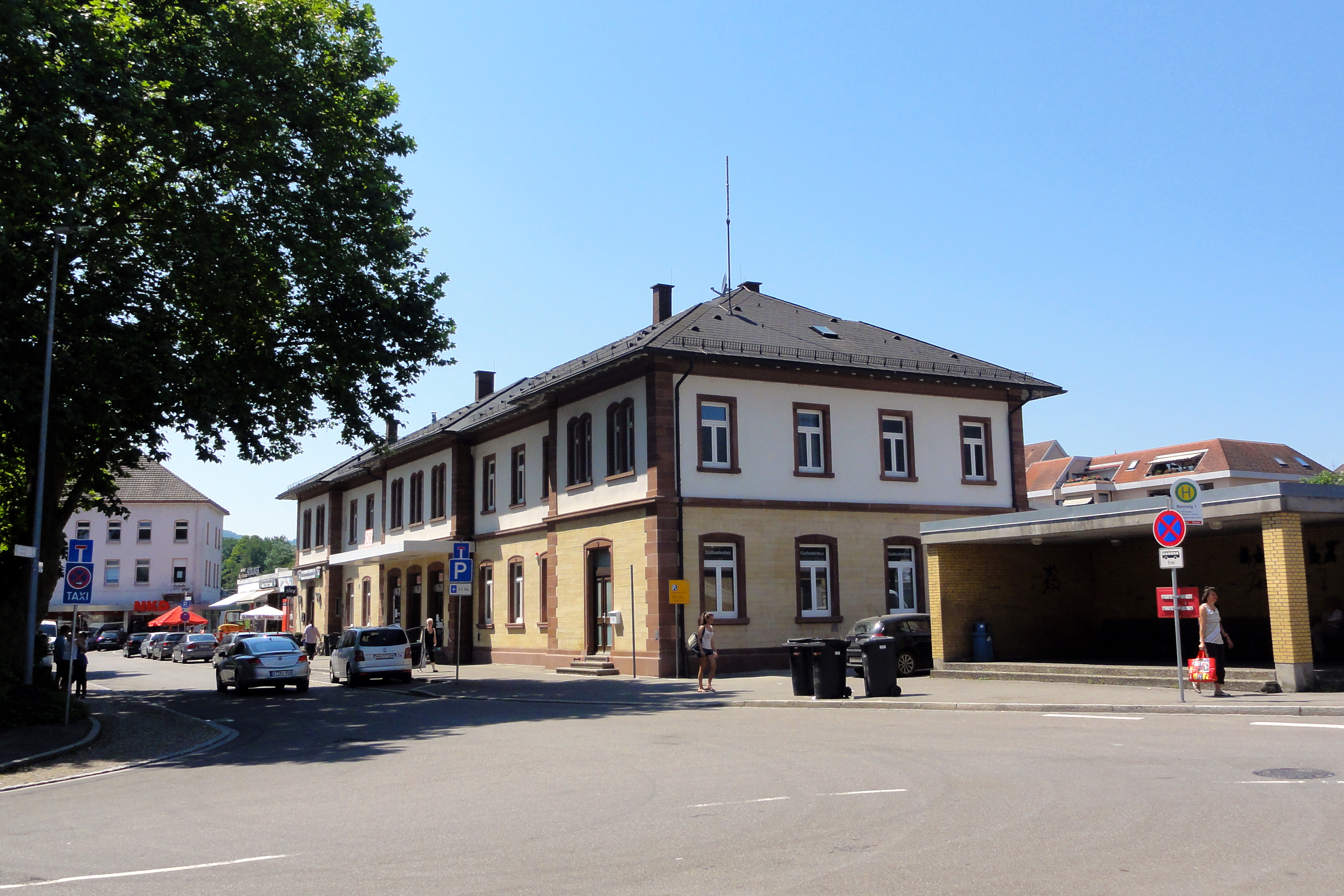
- The station building in 2012

General information
- Location: Bad Säckingen, Baden-Württemberg; Germany
- Coordinates: 47°33′21″N 7°56′55″E
- Owner: Deutsche Bahn
- Lines: High Rhine Railway (KBS 730); Wehra Valley Railway (until 1994)
- Distance: 288.8 km (179.5 mi) from Mannheim Hauptbahnhof
- Platforms: 2 side platforms
- Tracks: 2
- Train operators: DB Regio Baden-Württemberg
- Connections: Südbadenbus bus lines

Other information
- Fare zone: 1 (WTV)

Services
Preceding station	DB Regio Baden-Württemberg	Following station
Rheinfelden (Baden) towards Basel Bad Bf	RE 3	Waldshut towards Friedrichshafen Hafen
Preceding station	Basel S-Bahn	Following station
Wehr-Brennet towards Basel Bad Bf	RB30	Murg (Baden) towards Lauchringen
Location

Bad Säckingen station (German: Bahnhof Bad Säckingen) is a railway station in the town of Bad Säckingen, Baden-Württemberg, Germany. The station lies on the High Rhine Railway and the train services are operated by Deutsche Bahn. The station was formerly located on the Wehra Valley Railway to Schopfheim. Passenger service over that line ended in 1971, and the line itself was abandoned in 1994.

== Services ==
As of the December 2023 timetable change, the following services stop at Bad Säckingen:

Connection	Line	Frequency	Operator
RE 3	Basel Bad Bf – Rheinfelden (Baden) – Bad Säckingen – Schaffhausen – Überlingen – Friedrichshafen Hafen	60 min	DB Regio Baden-Württemberg
RB 3	Basel Bad Bf – Rheinfelden (Baden) – Bad Säckingen – Schaffhausen – Singen – Überlingen – Friedrichshafen Stadt	individual services	DB Regio Baden-Württemberg
RB30	Basel Bad Bf – Rheinfelden (Baden) – Bad Säckingen – Laufenburg – Waldshut – Lauchringen (– Erzingen)	30 min	DB Regio Baden-Württemberg
