= Basel Badischer Bahnhof =

Railway station in Basel, Switzerland

Basel Bad Bf
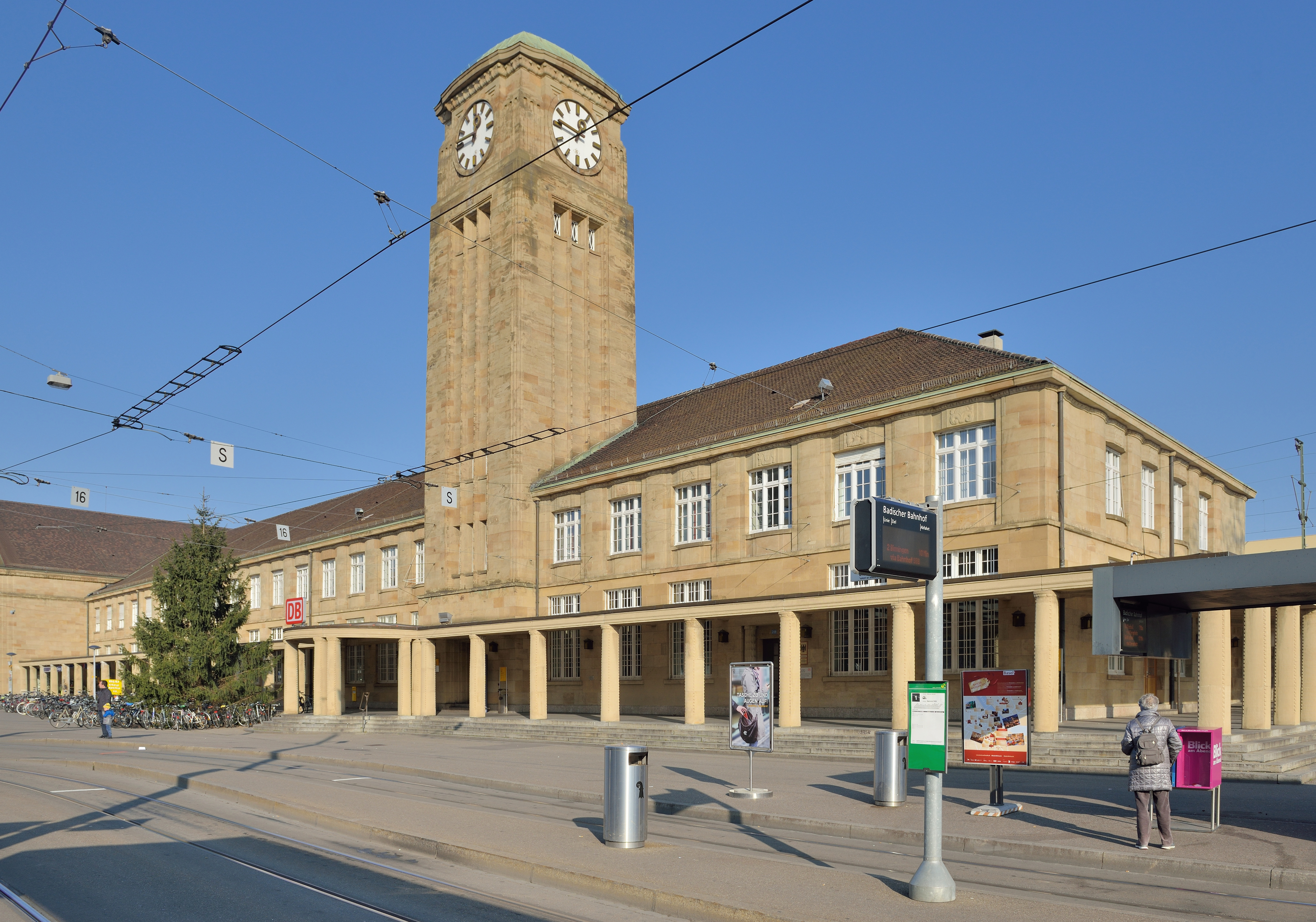

General information
- Location: Schwarzwaldallee 200; CH-4016 Basel; Basel, Basel-Stadt; Operates as if in Baden-Württemberg; Switzerland / Germany
- Coordinates: 47°34′03″N 7°36′26″E
- Owner: Grand Duchy of Baden State Railway (until 1920), Deutsche Reichsbahn (1920–1949), Deutsche Bundesbahn (1949–1993), Bundeseisenbahnvermögen (since 1994)
- Operator: DB Station&Service & DB Netz
- Lines: High Rhine Railway (KBS 730); Rhine Valley Railway (KBS 702); Wiese Valley Railway (KBS 735); Basel connecting line
- Platforms: 5 side platforms
- Tracks: 10
- Train operators: DB Fernverkehr; DB Regio Baden-Württemberg; FlixTrain; ÖBB; SBB GmbH

Construction
- Accessible: Yes

Other information
- Station code: -
- DS100 code: RB
- IBNR: 8000026
- Category: -
- IATA code: ZBA
- Fare zone: TNW: 10; RVL: 8
- Website: www.bahnhof.de

History
- Opened: 19 February 1855; 171 years ago
- Electrified: 13 September 1913; 112 years ago when the present edifice opened
- Former names: 1935–1948 Basel Deutsche Reichsbahn or Basel DRB

Services
Preceding station	DB Fernverkehr	Following station
Freiburg Hbf towards Berlin Ostbahnhof	ICE 12	Basel SBB towards Brig, Chur or Interlaken Ost
Freiburg Hbf towards Hamburg Hbf	ICE/ECE 20	Basel SBB Terminus
Freiburg Hbf towards Hamburg-Altona or Amsterdam Centraal	ICE 43	Basel SBB towards Basel SBB, Chur or Brig
Weil am Rhein towards München Hbf	ICE 60	Basel SBB Terminus
Freiburg Hbf towards Frankfurt (Main) Hbf	ECE 85 EuroCity towards Switzerland, EuroCityExpress towards Germany	Basel SBB towards Milano Centrale
Preceding station	ÖBB	Following station
Freiburg Hbf towards Amsterdam Centraal	Nightjet	Basel SBB towards Zürich HB
Freiburg Hbf towards Berlin Hbf	Nightjet	Basel SBB towards Zürich HB
Freiburg Hbf towards Hamburg-Altona	Nightjet	Basel SBB towards Zürich HB
Freiburg Hbf towards Praha hl.n.	EuroNight EC 12N	Basel SBB towards Zürich HB
Preceding station	DB Regio Baden-Württemberg	Following station
Terminus	RE 3	Rheinfelden (Baden) towards Friedrichshafen Hafen
Weil am Rhein towards Karlsruhe Hbf	RE 7	Terminus
Weil am Rhein towards Emmendingen	RB 27	Terminus
Preceding station	Basel S-Bahn	Following station
Basel SBB Terminus	S6	Riehen Niederholz towards Zell (Wiesental)
Terminus	RB30	Grenzach towards Lauchringen
Location
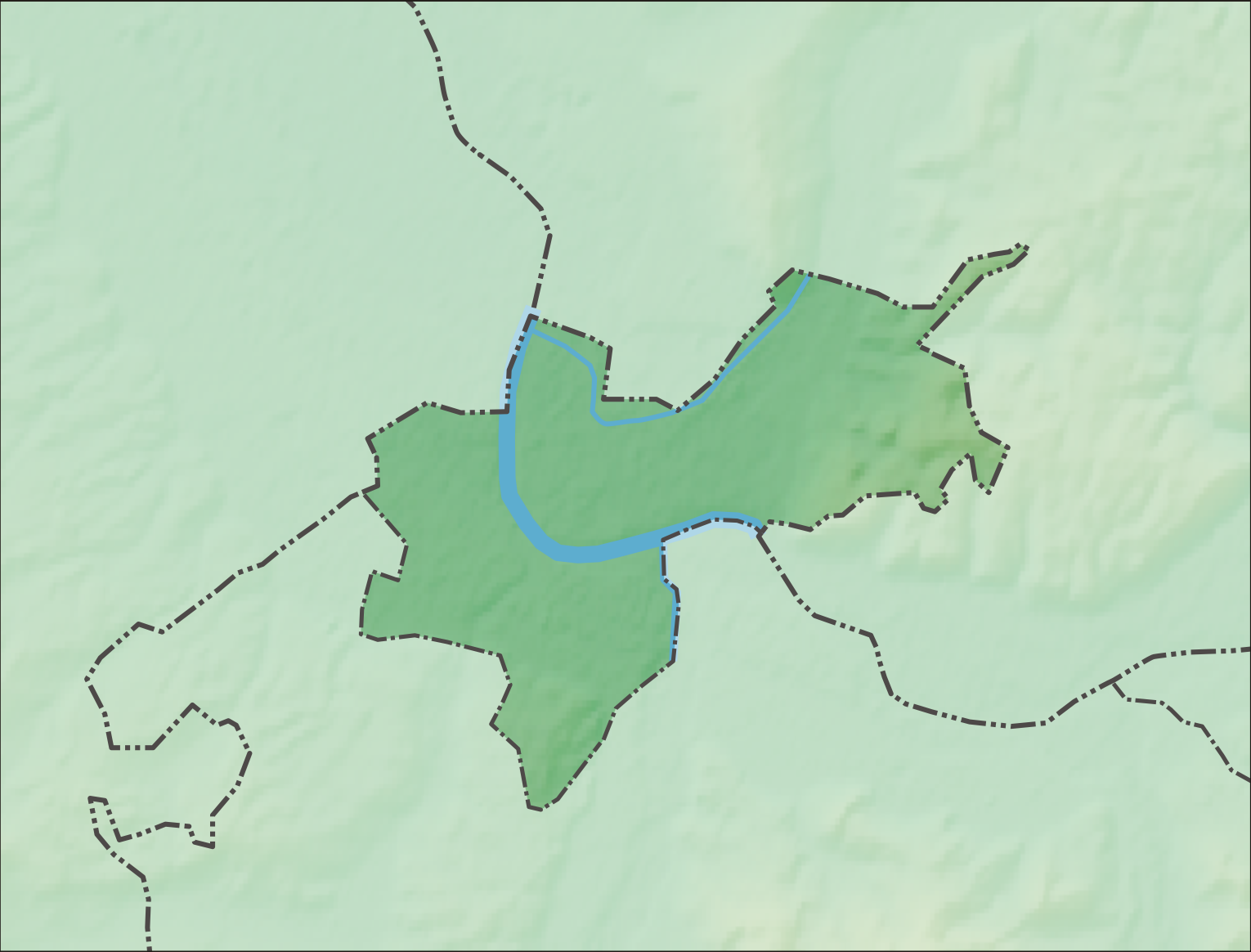
- Location within Switzerland Location within Canton of Basel-Stadt

Basel Badischer Bahnhof (Basel Baden Railway station; abbreviated Basel Bad) is a railway station in the Swiss city of Basel 2 km south of the Germany–Switzerland border. Despite its location, its land is an enclave of the EU Customs Union of Germany, with German rules applying to its rail traffic and infrastructure, the latter owned and operated by the respective German entities so that, for example, the station's clocks bear the "DB" logo of Deutsche Bahn.

The station is the city's second-largest, the larger being Basel SBB railway station operated by the Swiss Federal Railways (SBB CFF FFS). Basel Bad is served by the tri-national Regio S-Bahn Basel and by long-distance trains to and from Freiburg, Offenburg, Karlsruhe, Mannheim, Frankfurt, Amsterdam, Hamburg, Berlin and other cities, and is listed as a Swiss Heritage Site of national significance.

== History ==
In March 1838, the Grand Duchy of Baden State Railways started working on a railway line from Mannheim via Heidelberg, Karlsruhe and Freiburg im Breisgau. This line was called Badische Hauptbahn (Baden Main Line) or Rheintalbahn (Rhine Valley Line). A Swiss railway commission desired a continuation of the line into Basel and contacted the Grand Duchy of Baden in 1842.

In January 1851, the Rheintalbahn line reached the village of Haltingen, close to the Swiss border. Since the two governments had not agreed about how to build the station in Basel yet, the passengers were transported across the border with hackney carriages.

Finally, a treaty between the government of Baden and the Swiss Confederation entered into force on 27 July 1852, and has remained so into the present. The start of construction was further delayed, however, by the Swiss insisting on a terminal station and the Badische Staatseisenbahnen insisting on a through station in favour of the planned extension of the line towards Waldshut.

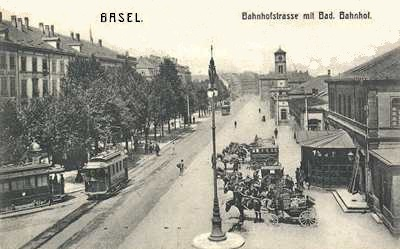
Badischer Bahnhof, 1862

The first Baden Railway station of Basel was built as a through station at nowaday's Messeplatz square about 800 meters west of today's one. The line from Haltingen to Basel was opened on 19 February 1855, with a temporary wooden station building. A further line to Konstanz in Baden was connected to the southern end of the station in 1856, and by 10 April 1859 Switzerland and Baden had finally agreed to build a permanent station, of which the construction started in May. The street entrances of the station building opened to nowaday's Riehenring street. In 1875, the Basel Connecting Line to Basel Swiss station was opened, running out of the Baden station parallel with the railway to Konstanz.

The increase of railway traffic in the beginning of 20th century required larger facilities. To get space for the urban development of Kleinbasel, the government of Basel insisted on a new station on a new site. It was chosen straight north northwest of the railway bridge across the Rhine. The station was moved to its current location between 1906 and 1913.

== Special customs and regulatory territory ==
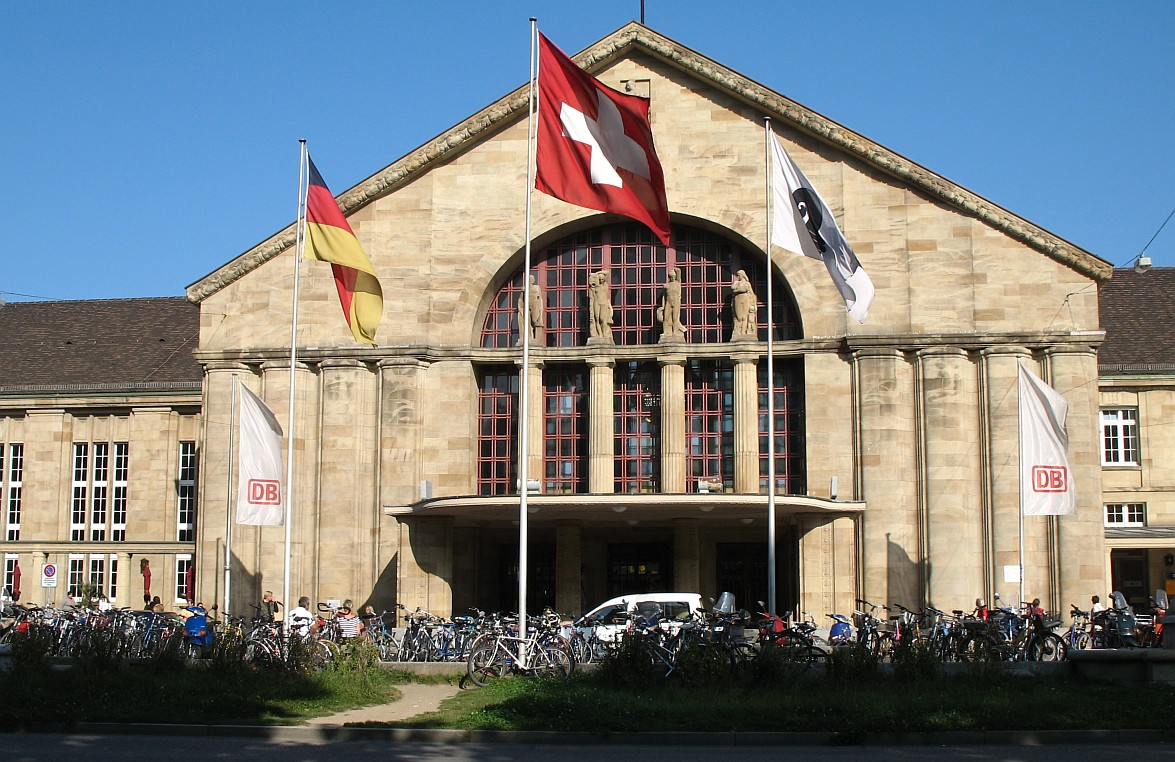
Basel Badischer Bahnhof

Although the Badischer Bahnhof is located in Switzerland, due to the 1852 treaty between the Swiss Confederation and the Grand Duchy of Baden (one of the predecessors of today's Germany), the terrain under its largest part, encompassing the platforms and part of the passenger tunnel that lead to the German/Swiss customs checkpoint, forms a special customs territory, which is both an exclave of the European Union Customs Union and an enclave within the Swiss customs area. The shops in the station hall are however, located in the Swiss customs union area and the Swiss franc is used as the official currency there (although the euro is accepted for train tickets). Customs checks are performed in a tunnel between the platforms and the station hall, while passengers of international trains transiting to Basel SBB may be subjected to on-board customs checks. Immigration checks have in turn been abolished since Switzerland joined the Schengen Area in 2008.

Except for the Basel connecting line, all lines served by the station along with traffic on them are under purview of the German Federal Railway Authority and the European Union Agency for Railways, being owned along with the station by the German Bundeseisenbahnvermögen, operated by DB Netz and DB Station&Service, regulated by the German Federal Network Agency and available exclusively for trains operated by German-licensed railway undertakings, including Deutsche Bahn (DB Fernverkehr & DB Regio), ÖBB, Swiss Federal Railways and the Basel S-Bahn.

== Layout ==
Basel Badischer Bahnhof has five side platforms serving ten tracks. The platforms are reached from two passenger tunnels leading from the main station building and from the southern tower-wing.

== Services ==
In the 2026 timetable, the following long-distance service stopped at the station:

=== Long distance services ===
Line	Route		Frequency
ICE 12	Berlin East – Berlin – Braunschweig – Kassel – Frankfurt – Mannheim – Karlsruhe – Offenburg – Freiburg – Basel Bad Bf – Basel SBB –	Bern – Interlaken East	120 min
ICE 12	Berlin East – Berlin – Braunschweig – Kassel – Frankfurt – Mannheim – Karlsruhe – Offenburg – Freiburg – Basel Bad Bf – Basel SBB –	Zürich	120 min
ICE/ECE 20	Hamburg – Hannover – Kassel – Frankfurt – Mannheim – Karlsruhe – Freiburg – Basel Bad Bf – Basel SBB		120 min
ICE 43	Hamburg-Altona – Hamburg – Bremen – Osnabrück - Münster – Dortmund – Essen – Düsseldorf –	Cologne – Frankfurt Airport – Mannheim – Karlsruhe – Freiburg – Basel Bad Bf – Basel SBB	120 min
ICE 43	Hannover – Bielefeld – Hamm – Dortmund – Wuppertal –	Cologne – Frankfurt Airport – Mannheim – Karlsruhe – Freiburg – Basel Bad Bf – Basel SBB	120 min
ICE 43	Amsterdam – Oberhausen – Duisburg – Düsseldorf –	Cologne – Frankfurt Airport – Mannheim – Karlsruhe – Freiburg – Basel Bad Bf – Basel SBB	120 min
ICE 60	Basel SBB – Basel Bad Bf – Offenburg – Karlsruhe – Bruchsal – Stuttgart – Ulm – Augsburg – Munich		one train pair
ECE 85	Milano – Lugano – Zürich – Basel SBB – Basel Bad Bf – Ringsheim/Europa-Park – Karlsruhe – Mannheim – Frankfurt		one train pair
Nightjet Zürich – Berlin	Zürich – Basel SBB – Basel Bad Bf – Offenburg – Karlsruhe – Frankfurt Süd – Leipzig (train split) –	Dresden – Decin – Prague	single service
EuroNight; Zürich – Prague	Zürich – Basel SBB – Basel Bad Bf – Offenburg – Karlsruhe – Frankfurt Süd – Leipzig (train split) –	Halle – Bitterfeld – Berlin	single service
Nightjet; Zürich – Hamburg-Altona	Zürich – Basel Bad Bf – Freiburg – Karlsruhe – Heidelberg – Frankfurt Süd – Hannover – Bremen – Hamburg – Hamburg-Altona		single service
Nightjet; Zürich – Amsterdam	Zürich – Basel Bad Bf – Freiburg – Offenburg – Bonn-Beuel – Köln – Utrecht – Amsterdam		one train pair
FLX 10	Basel Bad Bf – Freiburg – Offenburg – Karlsruhe – Heidelberg – Darmstadt – Frankfurt Süd – Erfurt – Halle – Berlin		one train pair

=== Regional services ===
Connection	Line	Frequency	Operator
RE 3	Basel Bad Bf – Bad Säckingen – Waldshut – Schaffhausen – Singen – Radolfzell – Friedrichshafen Hafen	60 min	DB Regio Baden-Württemberg
RE 7	(Basel SBB -) Basel Bad Bf – Weil am Rhein – Müllheim – Freiburg – Emmendingen – Herbolzheim – Lahr – Offenburg – Baden-Baden – Karlsruhe	60 min	DB Regio Baden-Württemberg
RB 27	(Basel SBB -) Basel Bad Bf – Weil am Rhein – Müllheim – Freiburg – Emmendingen (– Lahr – Offenburg)	60 min	DB Regio Baden-Württemberg
RB30	Basel Bad Bf – Laufenburg – Waldshut – Lauchringen (– Erzingen)	30 min	DB Regio Baden-Württemberg
S6	Basel SBB – Basel Bad Bf – Lörrach – Schopfheim – Zell (Wiesental)	30 min	SBB GmbH

== See also ==
- Rail transport in Germany
- Rail transport in Switzerland
