= Laufenburg (Baden) station =

Railway station in Baden-Württemberg on the High Rhine

Laufenburg (Baden)
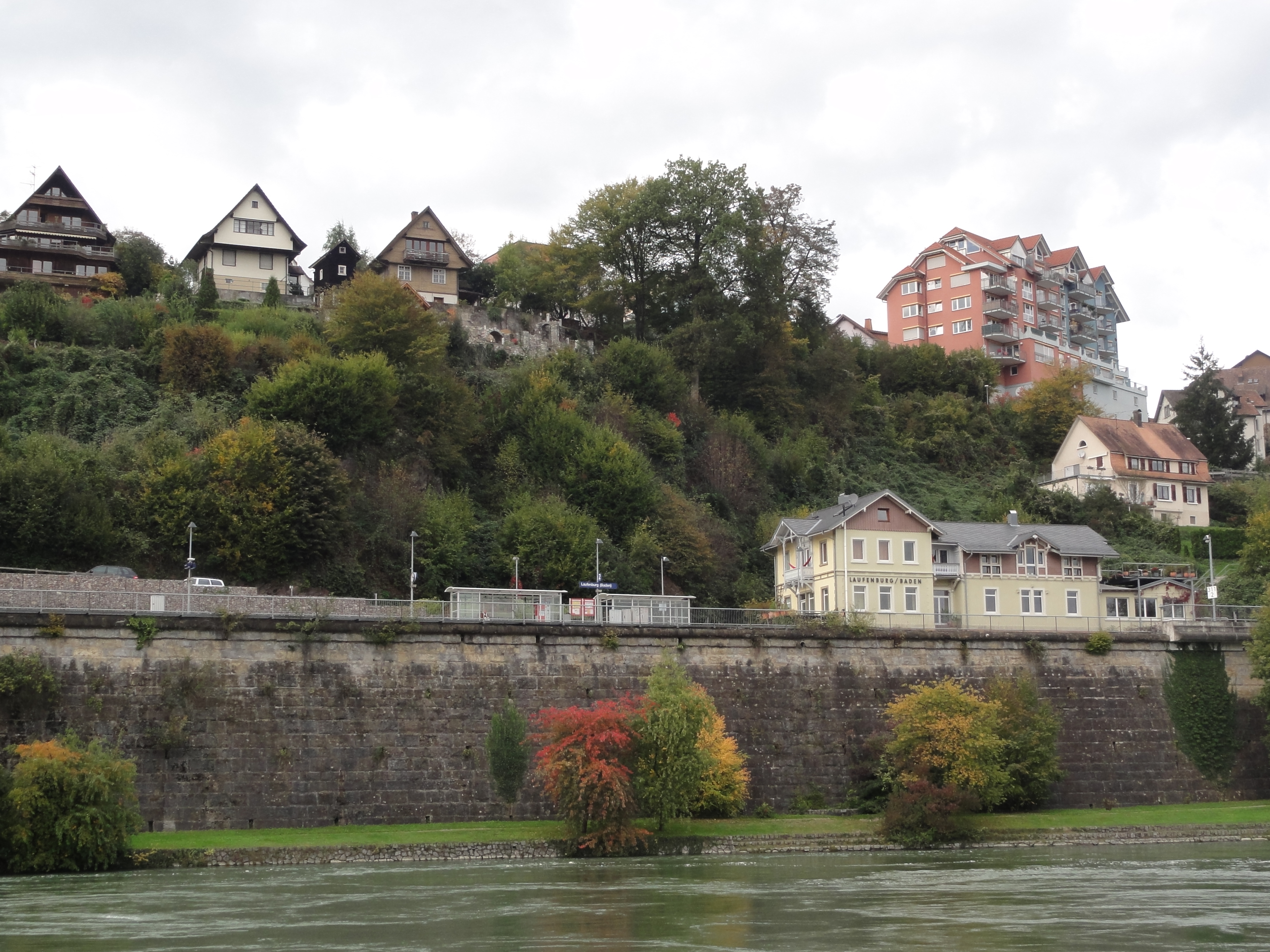
- The station in 2012

General information
- Location: Bahnhofstraße 9 Laufenburg, Baden-Württemberg; Germany
- Coordinates: 47°33′48″N 8°03′30″E
- Owner: DB Netz
- Operator: DB Station&Service
- Lines: High Rhine Railway (KBS 730)
- Distance: 311.2 km (193.4 mi) from Mannheim Hauptbahnhof
- Platforms: 2 side platforms
- Tracks: 2
- Train operators: DB Regio Baden-Württemberg
- Connections: Südbadenbus bus lines

Other information
- Station code: 3589
- DS100 code: RLFG
- IBNR: 8003585
- Category: 6
- Fare zone: 1 (WTV)

Services
Preceding station	Basel S-Bahn	Following station
Murg (Baden) towards Basel Bad Bf	RB30	Laufenburg (Baden) Ost towards Lauchringen
Location

Laufenburg (Baden) station (German: Bahnhof Laufenburg (Baden)) is a railway station in the town of Laufenburg (Baden), Baden-Württemberg, Germany. The station lies on the High Rhine Railway, directly next to the river and is opposite the Swiss part of Laufenburg. The train services are operated by Deutsche Bahn.

== Services ==
As of the December 2023 timetable change, the following services stop at Laufenburg (Baden):

- Basel S-Bahn RB30: hourly service between Basel Bad Bf and Lauchringen, supplemented by hourly weekday service in the afternoons between Basel and Waldshut.
