= Lauchringen station =

Railway station in Lauchringen, Germany

Lauchringen
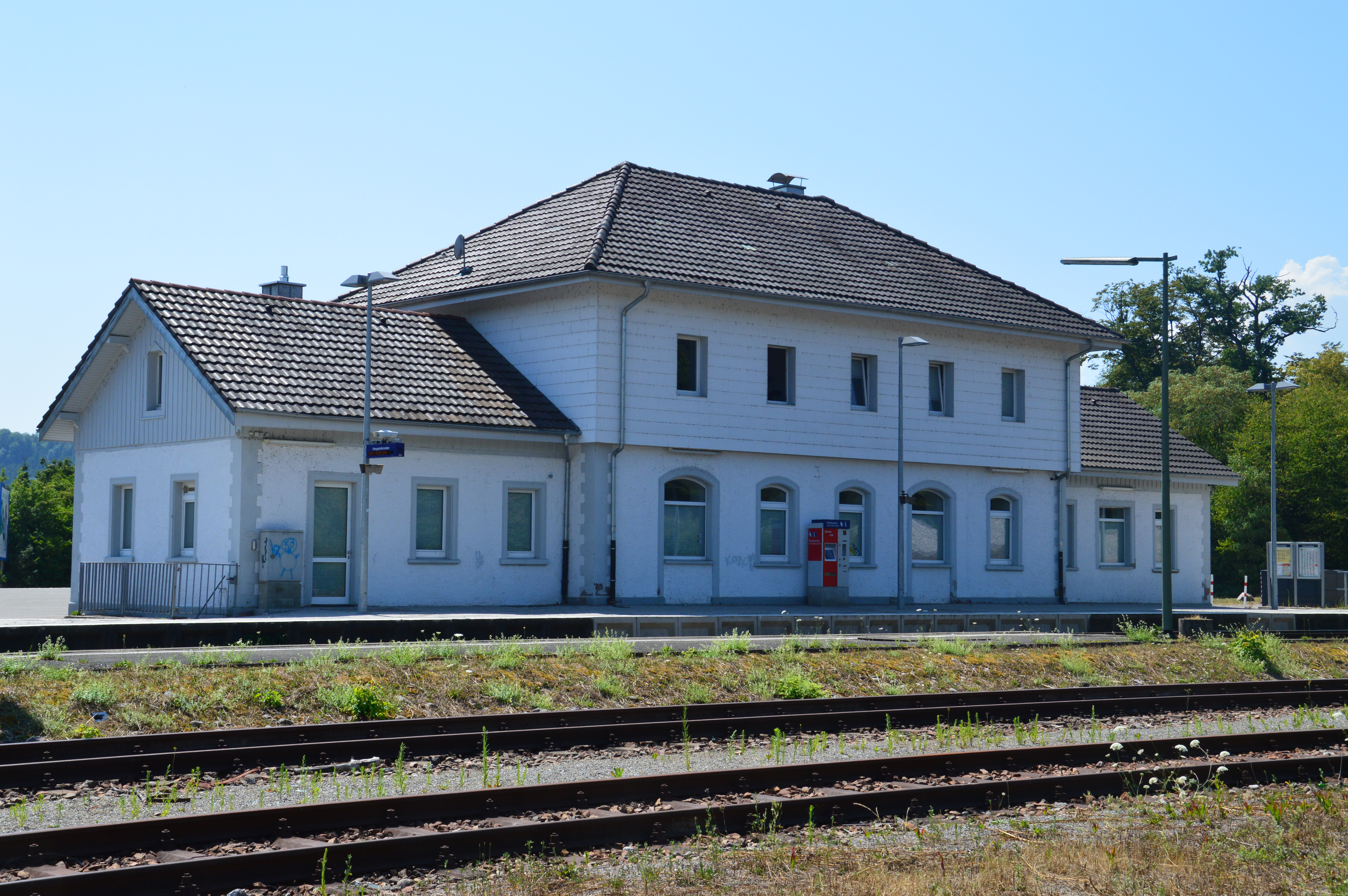
- The station in 2013

General information
- Location: Lauchringen, Baden-Württemberg; Germany
- Coordinates: 47°37′45″N 8°19′20″E
- Owner: DB Netz
- Operator: DB Station&Service
- Lines: High Rhine Railway (KBS 730); Wutach Valley Railway (KBS 737)
- Distance: 335.1 km (208.2 mi) from Mannheim Hauptbahnhof
- Platforms: 1 side platform
- Tracks: 1
- Train operators: DB Regio Baden-Württemberg
- Connections: Südbadenbus bus lines

Other information
- Fare zone: 3 (WTV)

Services
Preceding station	DB Regio Baden-Württemberg	Following station
Lauchringen West towards Ulm Hbf	RE 3	Grießen (Baden) towards Basel
Preceding station	Basel S-Bahn	Following station
Lauchringen West towards Basel Bad Bf	RB30	Grießen (Baden) towards Erzingen (Baden)
Location

Lauchringen station (German: Bahnhof Lauchringen) is a railway station in the town of Lauchringen, Baden-Württemberg, Germany. The station is located at the junction of the lies on the High Rhine Railway and Wutach Valley Railway, although there is no service over the latter from this station. Passengers continuing east on the High Rhine Railway to Erzingen (Baden) and beyond must change trains at Tiengen (Hochrhein).

== Services ==
As of the December 2023 timetable change, the following services stop at Lauchringen:

- DB Regio Baden-Württemberg RE 3: irregular service between Basel Bad Bf and Singen (Hohentwiel); every other train continues from Singen to Ulm Hauptbahnhof.
- Basel S-Bahn RB30: hourly service to Basel Bad Bf.
