= Stuttgart Österfeld station =

Railway station in Stuttgart, Germany

Stuttgart Österfeld
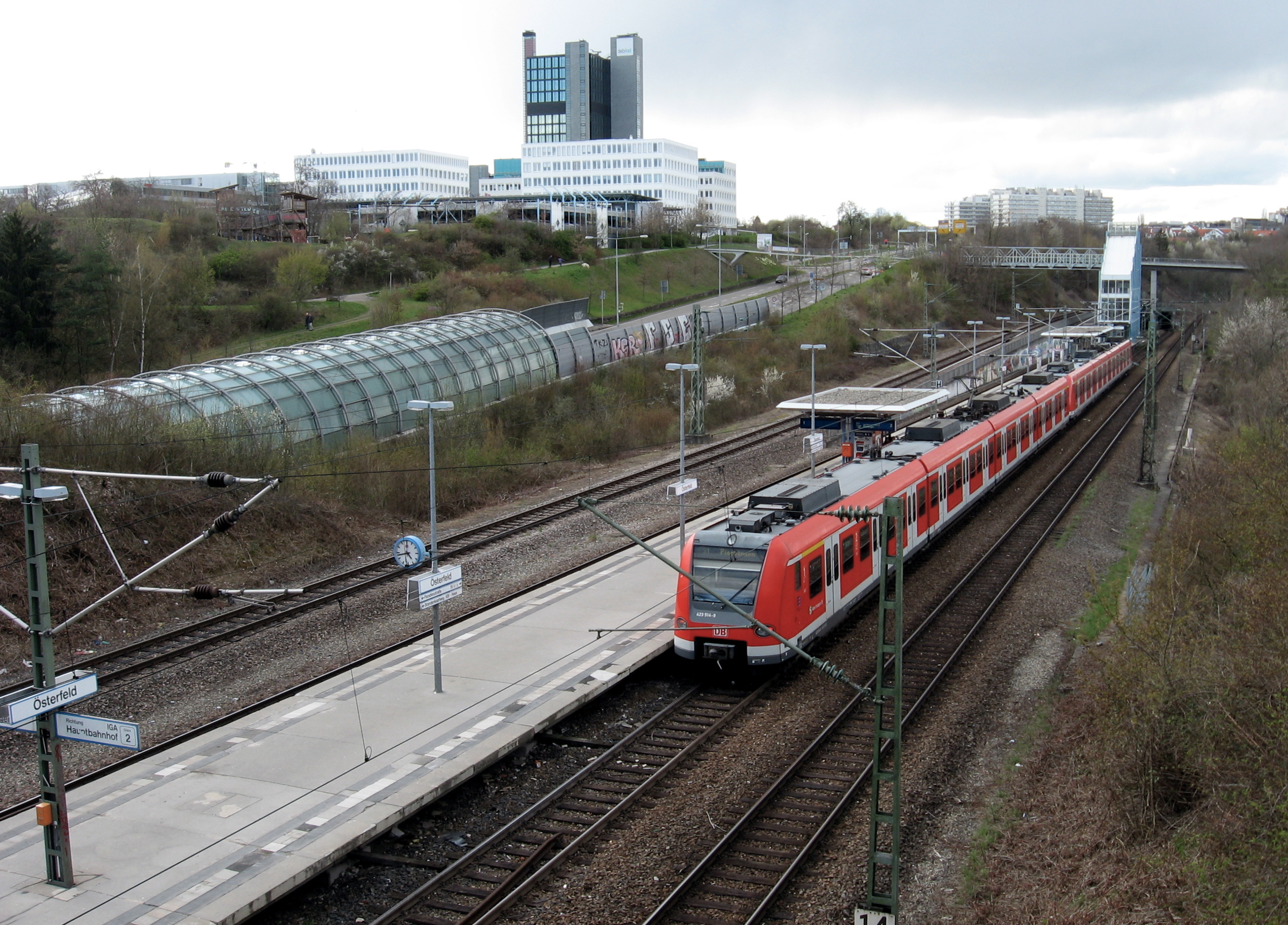
- View from the southeast, in the background is the Österfeld tunnel, the Stuttgart Engineering Park and scientific centres of the University of Stuttgart

General information
- Location: Paradiesstraße, Stuttgart, BW; Germany
- Coordinates: 48°44′15″N 9°7′0″E
- Lines: Main line of the Stuttgart S-Bahn; Stuttgart–Horb railway
- Platforms: 1 island platform
- Tracks: 2
- Train operators: S-Bahn Stuttgart

Construction
- Accessible: Yes

Other information
- Station code: 6075
- DS100 code: TSOS
- IBNR: 08005779
- Category: 4
- Fare zone: : 1
- Website: www.bahnhof.de

History
- Opened: 17 April 1993

Passengers
- 4050 (weekdays)

Services
| Preceding station | Stuttgart S-Bahn | Following station |
|---|---|---|
| Vaihingen towards Herrenberg | S1 | University towards Kirchheim (Teck) |
| Vaihingen towards Filderstadt | S2 | University towards Schorndorf |
| Vaihingen towards Flughafen/Messe | S3 | University towards Backnang |
Location

Österfeld station is located in the Stuttgart district of Vaihingen in the German state of Baden-Württemberg. It was built in 1985 at the junction of the main line of the Stuttgart S-Bahn where it emerges from the Hasenberg tunnel and connects with the Stuttgart–Horb railway, which runs above ground.

Attached to the station is a park-and-ride car park with 500 places, which is directly accessible from the A 831 autobahn. The station is otherwise only accessible by foot. Above the station is the STEP business park with numerous offices, including the headquarters of Debitel. Near the station are also the Verein Deutscher Ingenieure building and the Michael Bauer School (a Waldorf school).

== History ==
From the late 1970s, the planners of the S-Bahn line between the Pfaffenwald campus of the University of Stuttgart and Stuttgart-Rohr through Vaihingen concluded that the existing two-track Gäu Railway would not provide sufficient capacity for the S-Bahn and other traffic. They presented several alternatives, including an underground line on a north–south route through Vaihingen with a station in the centre of Vaihingen or alternatively the quadruplication of the section of the Gäu Railway running through Vaihingen. The Stuttgart City Council requested the federal and state governments to support the underground option at Vaihingen. As the federal and state governments rejected this, the city sought an additional station later called Österfeld to the north of the Nesenbach viaduct to support development of the residential areas of Vaihingen. The Verkehrs- und Tarifverbund Stuttgart (“Stuttgart Transport and Fares Association”, VVS) investigated this proposal and concluded that the forecast traffic would not justify the establishment of such a station at the time of the opening of the S-Bahn line, although the option of its future construction should be kept open. Therefore, the line was opened in 1985 as an above-ground four-track line, with space provided at the eventual Österfeld station between the tracks for the future installation of an island platform. This provision created an additional cost of 2.45 million Deutsche Marks, of which the city funded 0.35 million DM.

In 1990 the Hewlett-Packard(HP) company planned a development in an open area at the site of the proposed station and announced it would create 3,500 jobs when completed. Mayor Manfred Rommel requested that the then Bundesbahndirektion Stuttgart (the local Deutsche Bundesbahn railway division) implement the construction option, so that the council could approve the location of the HP development plan. The Bundesbahndirektion expected that the extended journey times due to the additional stop would require additional S-Bahn trains and decided to increase the number of passengers and thus the profitability of the station by building a park-and-ride facility. It opened together with the station in the spring of 1993 in time for the opening of the International Garden Festival on the Killesberg in order to relieve parking and traffic in the vicinity of the exhibition grounds. Because of the time taken for the design and approvals, construction could only begin in July 1992. Despite the time pressure and because of the continued operations of the S-Bahn, this work was carried out mostly at night. This led to high construction costs in excess of 15 million DM and the station was opened on 17 April 1993, in time for the festival. The car park and the station were not well used by visitors to the festival.

HP abandoned its development plans, however. The resulting loss of revenue was taken over by the city of Stuttgart in accordance with its contract with Deutsche Bundesbahn.

Later a Böblingen-based company abandoned its plans to develop the site. Instead, the city built the STEP (Stuttgart Engineering Park) industrial park on the site, which included the headquarters of Debitel. This skyscraper is still an outstanding landmark, but since a merger it no longer houses the Debitel headquarters.

== Rail services ==
In 2003, the station is used on average days by around 4,050 people. The superimposition of S-Bahn lines S1, S2 and S3 results in a 5-minute interval service in the peak hours and a 10-minute interval service during the off-peak to Vaihingen and to Stuttgart city centre. The trip to Stuttgart Central Station (Hauptbahnhof) takes 13 minutes. The station is classified by Deutsche Bahn as a category 3 station.

| Line | Route |
|---|---|
| S 1 | Kirchheim (Teck) – Wendlingen – Plochingen – Esslingen – Neckarpark – Bad Cannstatt – Hauptbahnhof – Schwabstraße – Österfeld – Vaihingen – Rohr – Böblingen – Herrenberg (extra trains in the peak between Esslingen and Böblingen.) |
| S 2 | Schorndorf – Weinstadt – Waiblingen – Bad Cannstatt – Hauptbahnhof – Schwabstraße – University – Österfeld – Vaihingen – Rohr – Flughafen/Messe – Filderstadt (extra trains in the peak between Schorndorf and Vaihingen.) |
| S 3 | Backnang – Winnenden – Waiblingen – Bad Cannstatt – Hauptbahnhof – Österfeld – Vaihingen – Rohr – Flughafen/Messe (extra trains in the peak between Backnang and Vaihingen). |
