= Class 39 =

Class 39 may refer to:

- A German passenger locomotive class with a 2-8-2 wheel arrangement operated by the Deutsche Reichsbahn:
  - Class 39.0-2: Prussian P 10, PKP class Pt1
  - Class 39.3: BBÖ 670
  - Class 39.4: JDŽ 06
  - Class 39.10^{p}: PKP Class Pt31
