= Stuttgart–Horb railway =

Railway in Baden-Württemberg, Germany

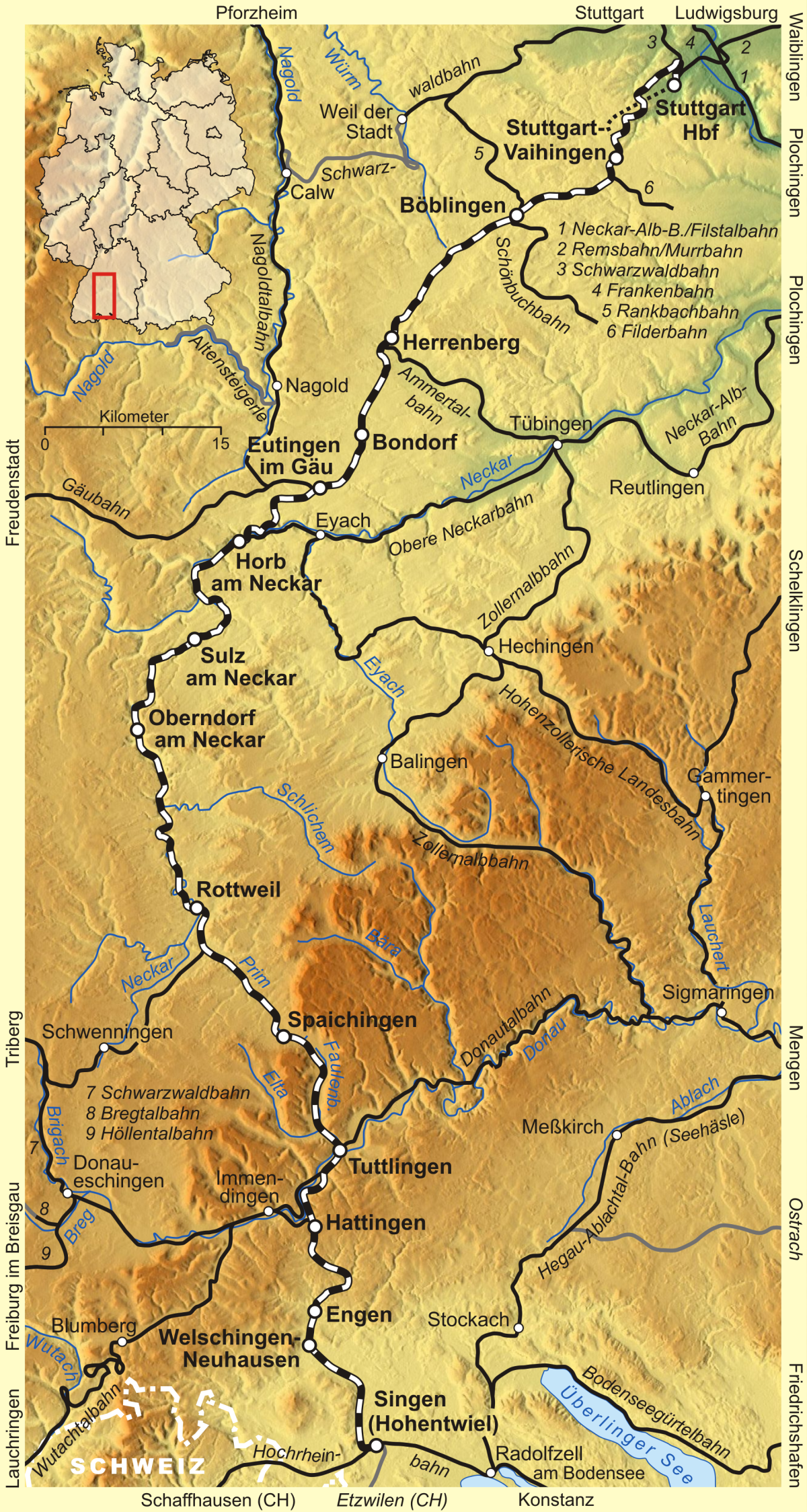

Overview
- Other name(s): Gäu Railway
- Native name: Gäubahn
- Owner: Deutsche Bahn
- Line number: 4860 (Stuttgart–Horb); 4861 (Stuttgart-Österfeld–Stuttgart-Rohr S-Bahn track)
- Locale: Baden-Württemberg, Germany
- Termini: Stuttgart; Horb

Service
- Route number: 740
- Operator(s): DB Netz

Technical
- Line length: 67.227 km (41.773 mi)
- Track gauge: 1,435 mm (4 ft 8 1/2 in) standard gauge
- Minimum radius: 315 m (1,033 ft)
- Electrification: 15 kV/16.7 Hz AC overhead catenary
- Operating speed: 160 km/h (99 mph)

The Stuttgart–Horb railway is a 67.227 kilometer-long railway in the southern part of the state of Baden-Württemberg in Germany, running from Stuttgart to Horb. It forms part of a railway known as the Gäubahn (IPA: [ˈɡɔɪbaːn]) or Gäu Railway. The Royal Württemberg State Railways (Königlich Württembergischen Staats-Eisenbahnen or K.W.St.E.) and the Baden State Railways (Badische Staatseisenbahnen) constructed the majority of this line between the years 1866 and 1879. Today the partially single-track, fully electrified line features the high-speed Intercity-Express (ICE) service, with its tilting train technology, traveling from Stuttgart to Zürich. In addition, a multitude of local train services of numerous railway companies are on offer. The Gäu Railway is also a significant line in the North-South freight service system.

== Route details ==
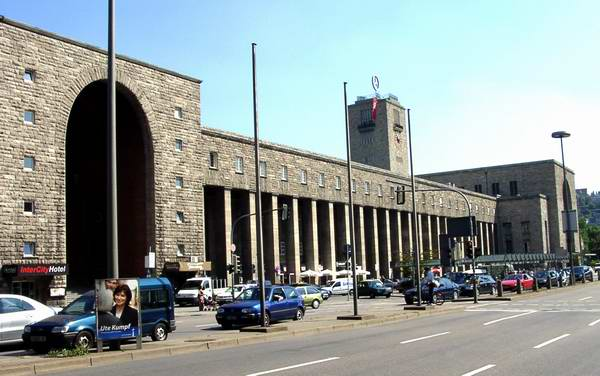
Stuttgart Hauptbahnhof, starting point of the Gäu Railway, and capital of the state of Baden-Württemberg

The Stuttgart–Horb railway steadily ascends from Stuttgart Hbf in a continuous loop around the city centre, which, due to its superb views of the basin of the Stuttgart valley, lent the name "Panoramabahn" to this section, and counts as one of the most beautiful city centre railways in Germany. From the city it heads in a southwesterly direction, and runs alongside the nature park Schönbuch between Böblingen und Herrenberg. From there, the Gäubahn runs through the eponymous Gäu to Eutingen. The route then descends into the Neckar valley as far as Horb and touches the eastern foothills of the Black Forest.

The Stuttgart–Horb railway is a main line railway, 67.2 kilometres in length. The entire line is electrified and is constructed to be used by the ICE tilting train technology. The line features twin tracks between Stuttgart and Horb and has a total of four tracks between the stations Stuttgart-Österfeld and Stuttgart-Rohr, a 3.5-kilometer-long section.

The line crosses three districts of the state of Baden-Württemberg and is part of three public transport associations. In the Stuttgart area, and in the district of Böblingen, namely between Stuttgart Hbf and Bondorf, the line is part of the transport-and-tariff association Stuttgart (Verkehrs- und Tarifverbund Stuttgart (VVS)). The station in Ergenzingen is the only station in the district of Tübingen, and is part of the Neckar-Alb-Donau transport association (Verkehrsverbund Neckar-Alb-Donau (NALDO)). Between Eutingen and Horb, the line traverses the district of Freudenstadt, and its transport association (Verkehrs-Gemeinschaft Landkreis Freudenstadt (VGS)).

== History ==
=== Construction of the Eutingen–Horb section (1874) ===
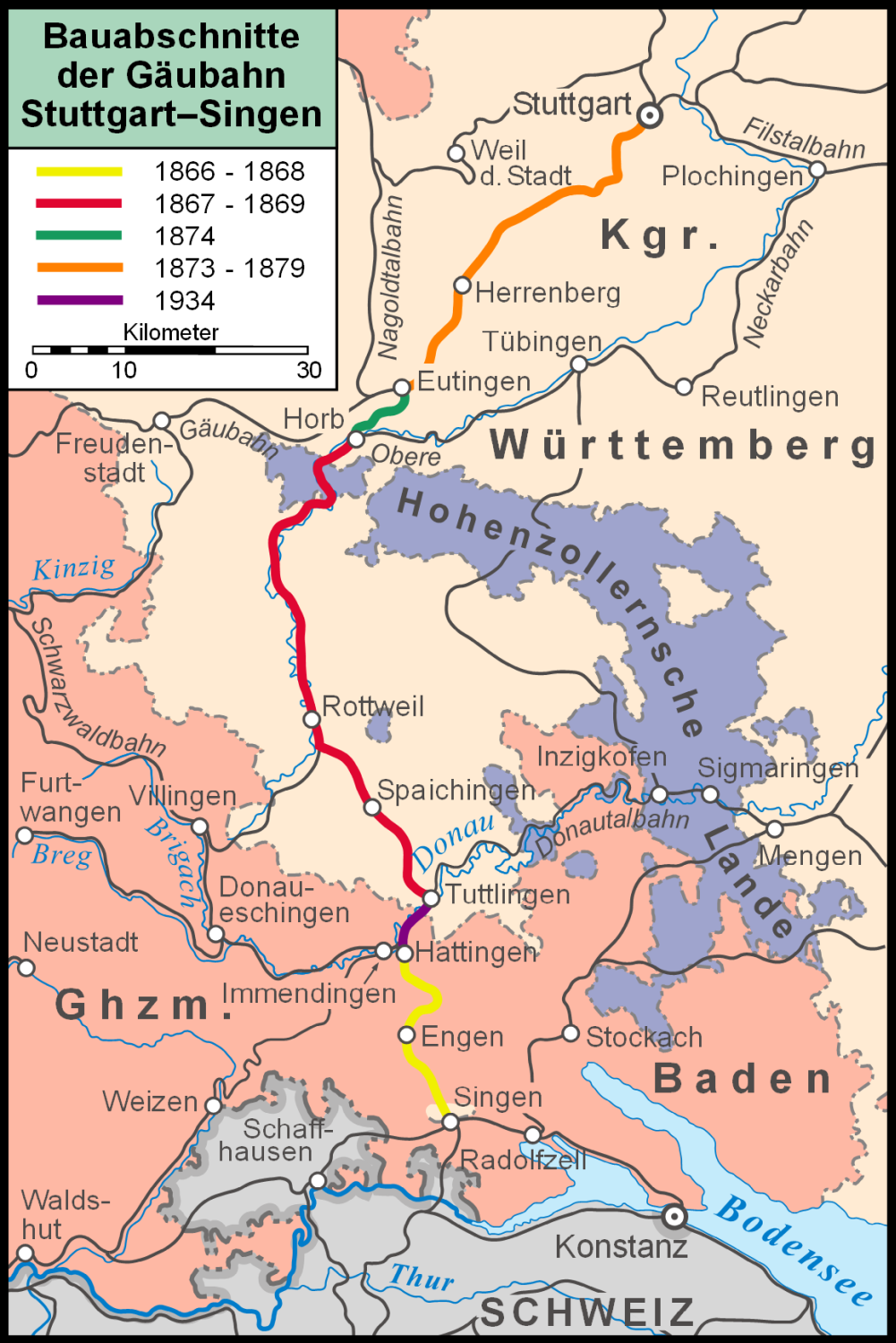
Overview of the construction history of the Gäubahn

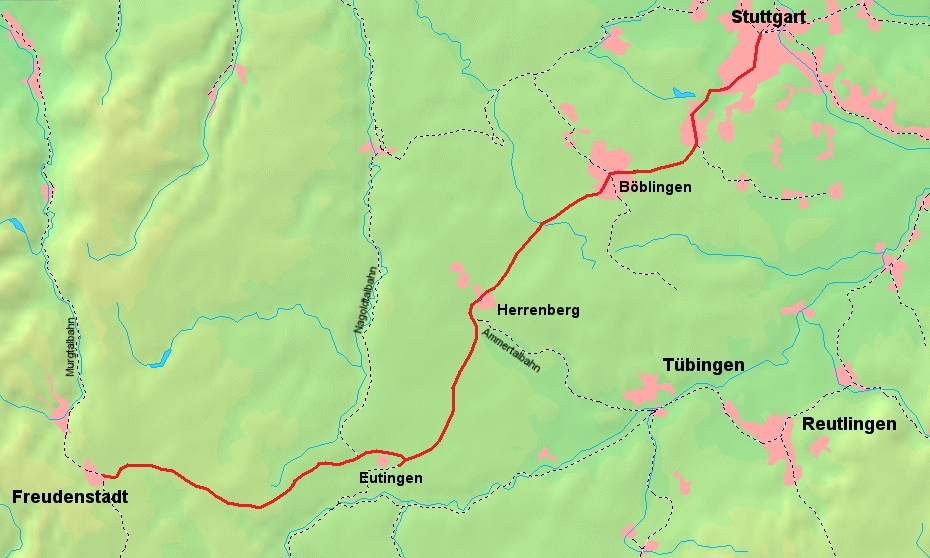
The Gäubahn between Stuttgart and Freudenstadt

Württemberg completed the section from Eutingen to connect to the Upper Neckar Railway (Obere Neckarbahn) in Horb on 1 June 1874. However, the aim was not to connect Horb via the Gäu and Böblingen to Stuttgart. Rather, the Royal Württemberg State Railways established the Nagold Valley Railway, a connection between Pforzheim and Horb, the completion of which made Horb a railway junction in 1874. However, the Royal Württemberg State Railways initially did not attempt to build a much shorter direct connection from Stuttgart to Horb because the gradients seemed too difficult to overcome.

=== Construction of the Stuttgart–Eutingen section (1879) ===
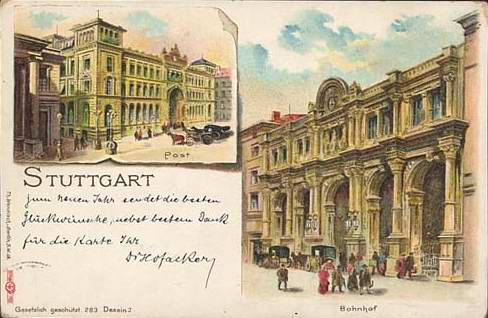
The former Stuttgart Centralbahnhof, the starting point of construction of the Gäubahn in the direction of Freudenstadt

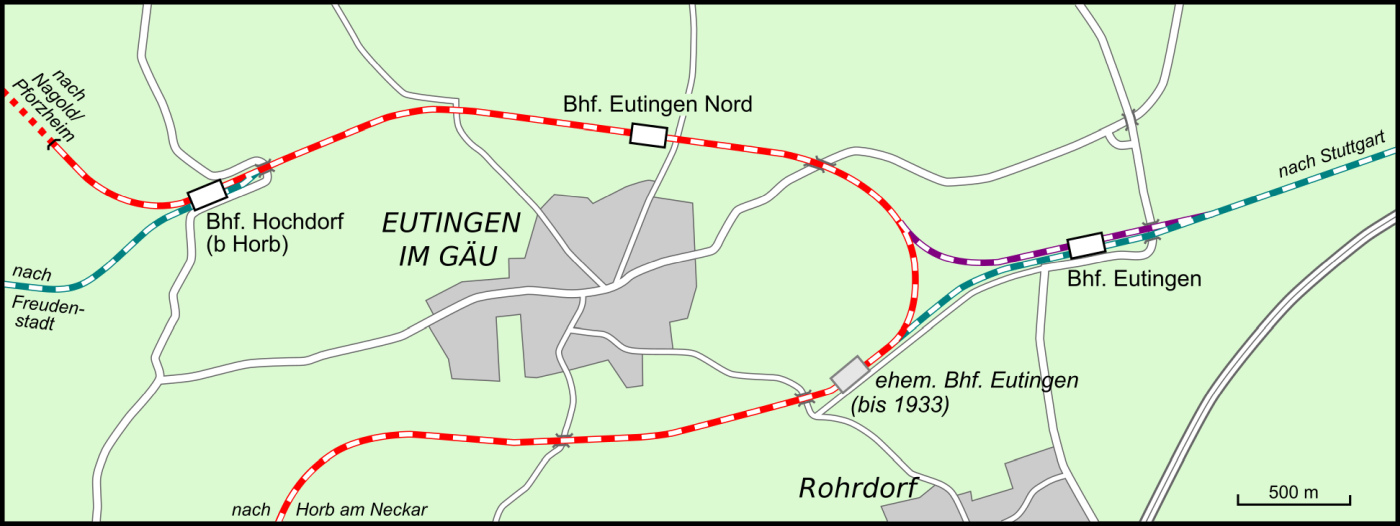
The construction of the Gäubahn around Eutingen

On 22 March 1873, the state of Württemberg legislated the creation of a railway between Stuttgart, via Herrenberg and Eutingen, to Freudenstadt, closing the gap between Stuttgart and Eutingen. In the discussions prior to the passage of this law, the term Gäubahn was used for the first time to label the section Stuttgart–Freudenstadt, and the term would later become the name for the entire line between Stuttgart and Singen. In November of the same year, construction on the technically challenging railway began in Stuttgart, led by the Württemberg engineer Georg Morlok. The route on the hillside was complicated, it required inclines of up to 1:52, bank engines in front and behind trains to Stuttgart-West, a large number of tunnels and deep cuts, the 430 metre-long and 39 metre-high Vogelsang embankment and the 42 metre-high Ziegelklingen embankment. A total of 1,600,000 cubic metres of earth were moved. The section to Vaihingen was the most expensive of the entire route, which cost a total of 31 million marks.

Much of the labour recruited by Morlok came from Italy. Construction went well: During the winter 1877/78, the line had already reached Herrenberg. On 20 August 1879, after a trial run from Stuttgart to Freudenstadt, the Royal Württemberg State Railways officially opened this section on 2 September 1879, in the presence of Georg Morlok, the president of Württemberg Hermann von Mittnacht, the mayor of Stuttgart Gottlob Friedrich von Hack, and many other dignitaries. The construction of this section shortened the distance between Stuttgart via Horb and Tuttlingen to Immendingen by 35 kilometers, and cut the trip time by 1 to 2 hours.

=== From regional to long-distance railway (1879–1919) ===
The Stuttgart–Horb–Tuttlingen–Immendingen line was primarily of regional significance at this time. The terminus of all long-distance travel was Immendingen. By the end of the 19th century trip times were becoming quite a bit shorter, to the point where the trip between Tuttlingen and Stuttgart had been cut down to only 3 hours in 1897, 4 to 5 hours less than in the 1870s. Starting in 1900, 3 daily express long-distance trains traversed the line. Around the turn of the century, the Royal Württemberg State Railways mostly used the steam locomotives of the class Württemberg AD for their express service, which were in turn replaced by the class Württemberg C during World War I. The class Württemberg T 5 was used for regional service. Possibly the most famous passenger on this line, Vladimir Lenin, the leader of the Russian Revolution, travelled from Zürich via Stuttgart to Petrograd in a special train on 9 April 1917.

The Royal Württemberg State Railways started to lay a second track alongside the originally single-track railway on short sections of the line in the 1880s and 1890s. In 1886, the first section to be made into a twin-track line was the 4.4-kilometer-long piece between Horb am Neckar and Eutingen im Gäu. In 1895, the 8.6-kilometer-long section between Stuttgart Hauptbahnhof and Stuttgart West received a second track and this was as extended as far as Böblingen from 22 November 1905.

The 1.2-kilometer connecting curve between Stuttgart North (Nordbahnhof) and the Stuttgart–Horb railway was opened on 1 November 1895. An initially planned connection line between Zuffenhausen and Stuttgart West was not realised. Traffic between Stuttgart and Böblingen increased from 16 trains (1890/91) to 32 trains in the winter of 1902/03.

In the period between World War I and World War II, the transport infrastructure in Germany received numerous improvements. On 22 October 1922, the new main station in Stuttgart (Stuttgart Hauptbahnhof) was officially opened. This removed the chokepoint at the terminus of the line and enabled the expansion of the capacity of rail traffic. Deutsche Reichsbahn altered the route taken by the line in the centre of Stuttgart to Eckartshaldenweg, avoiding Stuttgart North station, in autumn 1922.

In the 1920s, the Free People's State of Württemberg, as Württemberg was known during the Weimar Republic, undertook to expand the single-track lines constructed in the 19th century. The goal was to enable rail traffic from Berlin to Switzerland and Italy to utilise not just the railways in the neighbouring territories of Baden and Bavaria, but also the tracks owned by Württemberg. In addition, the Reichswehr had an interest in a high-capacity rail connection between Berlin and the southwestern border, which, particularly after the return of Alsace-Lorraine to France in 1918, was not as close to the French border as the Rhine Valley Railway from Mannheim to Basel, and would not be as easy to disrupt in the event of war. The occupation of the city of Offenburg by French troops in 1923 reinforced the desire for an effective and efficient alternative route.

As part of the expansion of the line, the Reichsbahn also expanded Horb am Neckar station, and replaced the old Eutingen station building with a large new building.

The expansions during the 1920s and 1930s resulted in great improvements in the service schedule on the Gäubahn. Express trains travelled from Berlin via Erfurt, Würzburg, Stuttgart, Zürich, and Milan all the way to Rome. The last peacetime schedule in 1939 showed 3 express trains from Berlin to Italy, even though not all of the trains continued from Milan to Rome. In addition there was express service between Berlin and Lucerne as well as between Stuttgart and Konstanz. Travel time between Stuttgart and Singen was cut to 2 hours and 41 minutes in 1933, and the regional and local service schedules also saw marked improvements.

As was true prior to the railway expansion, and since World War I, the Württemberg class C steam locomotives were used in express service. After the construction of the connecting curve from Tuttlingen to Hattingen, the Prussian P 10 which assumed the lead on these trains. The Württemberg class C was reassigned to manage the regional and local service traffic. The class Württemberg T 5 was also still seen, but was replaced by 1933 by the DRG Class 24. The Prussian P 8 had already been used since 1920 between Horb and Immendingen. For freight service, the Prussian G 12 as well as the Württemberg K were used. Starting in 1924, the Reichsbahn began to assign the Prussian G 10 to short-distance freight service, and between 1936 and 1938, the DRG Class 86 saw use in the same capacity.

During World War II, passenger service was reduced in favour of the rather more significant freight traffic. Axis partner Italy received coal shipments from Upper Silesia using freight trains on the line. It lost much of its military freight significance in the North-South corridor with the German attack on the Soviet Union, and many of the newer locomotives, especially the Prussian P 10, were relocated by the Reichsbahn to eastern Europe, while passenger trains on the line again saw the use of the Württemberg C locomotive.

=== War damage, dismantlement and diesel operation (1945–1962) ===
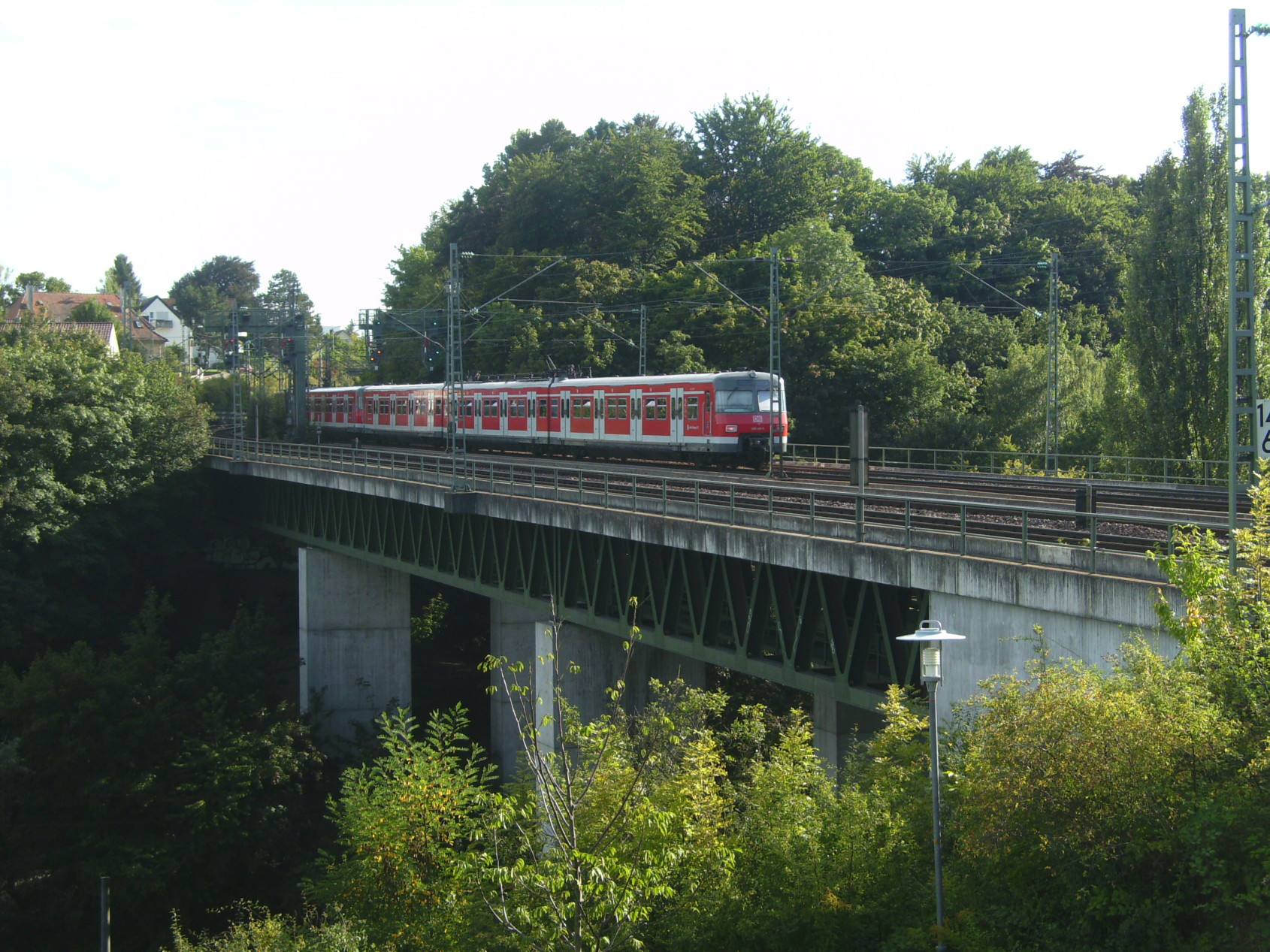
The Nesenbach viaduct in Stuttgart-Vaihingen, destroyed in April 1945, was rebuilt in 1946, and expanded into 4 tracks in 1982/83

Until February 1945, the Gäubahn did not suffer much damage during World War II, with the exception of aerial bombardment in 1944/45, which caused severe damage to the stations in Herrenberg and Horb am Neckar. This damage only disrupted traffic in the short term. More significant was the damage caused by German troops in April 1945, when several bridges were blown up between Stuttgart and Böblingen, stopping train traffic altogether shortly before the end of the war. Also in April 1945, American and French troops occupied southwestern Germany, which meant that the section of the line between Bondorf and Stuttgart fell into the American zone of occupation, while the section between Ergenzingen and Horb was assigned to the French zone. It was not until 13 August 1946 that the railway was opened again for through traffic.

France insisted on its right to reparations, unlike the United States of America, and in 1946 dismantled the second track between Horb and Tuttlingen, which had only been laid a few years before. Ever since, the Gäubahn is twin-tracked only between Stuttgart and Horb, as well as between Hattingen and Singen. The border between the American and French zones was responsible for the lack of through-traffic between Stuttgart and Singen, which did not resume until 1948. Compared to the heyday of the line at the end of the 1930s, the service schedule was severely reduced, and did not reach the same level as before the war until the end of the 1950s. The service to and from Berlin, for which the line had been expanded in the time between the wars, was not resumed by the Deutsche Bundesbahn, and the traffic corridor Berlin–Erfurt–Würzburg–Stuttgart–Zürich had lost its significance due to the separation of East Germany and West Germany.

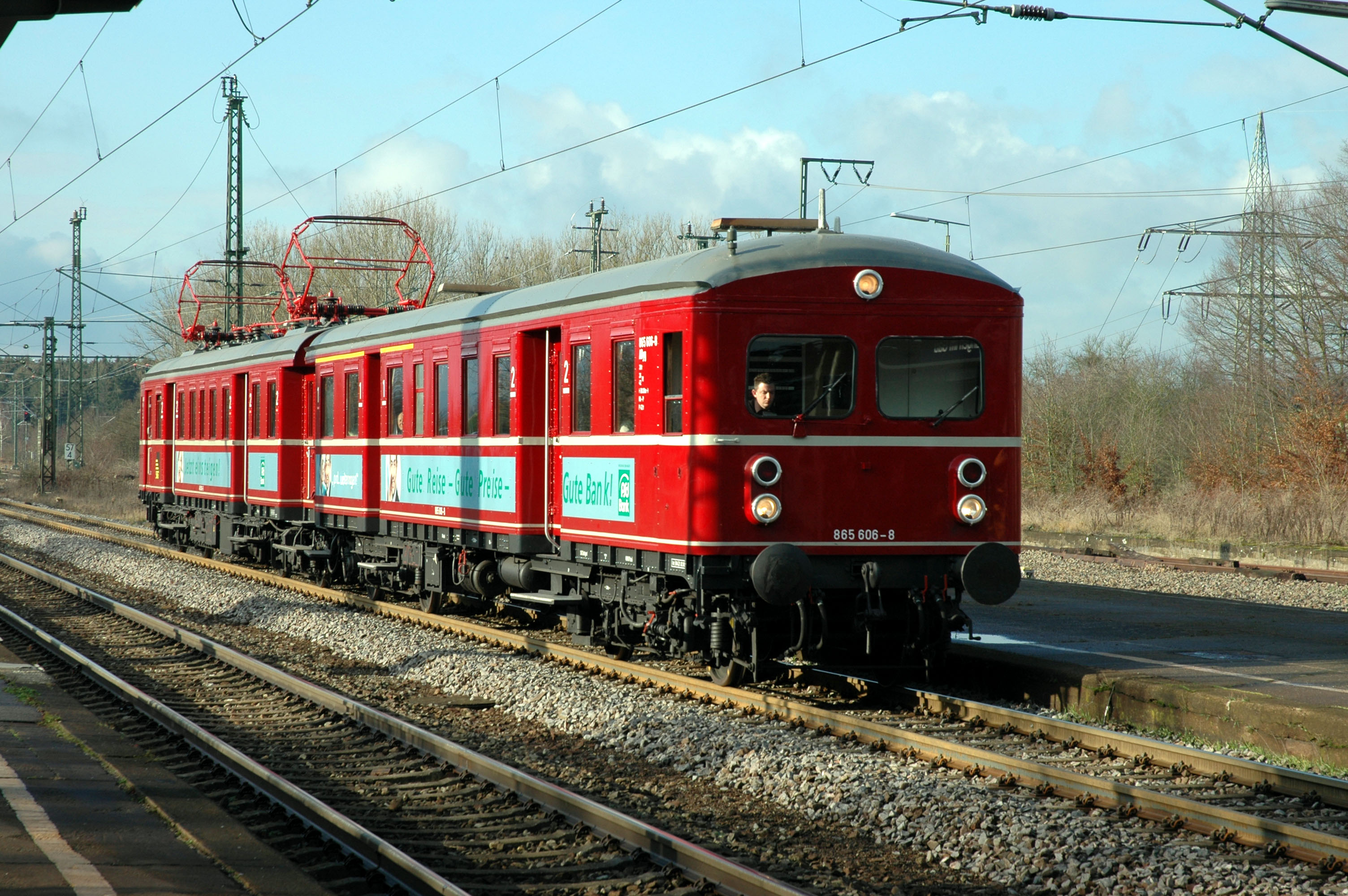
DRG class 465, also known at ET 65, in Eutingen

Starting in the 1950s, the Bundesbahn extended some of the express trains between Zürich and Stuttgart to Hamburg. Also, express service was reinstated between Stuttgart and Italy, largely due to the influx of guest workers from Italy into Baden-Württemberg at the end of the decade. These trains primarily saw the use of the Prussian P 10 and the Prussian P 8. Between 1958 and the middle of the 1970s, diesel locomotives of the class DB Class V 100 and DB Class V 200 replaced the steam locomotives on the Gäubahn, with the DB Class V 200.1 being used for freight service.

=== Electrification ===
The Bundesbahn electrified the section between Stuttgart and Böblingen in 1963, with the goal of reducing travel time in local service trains in the Stuttgart area. The section Böblingen–Horb was converted to electric operation in 1974, followed by Böblingen–Horb section in 1977.

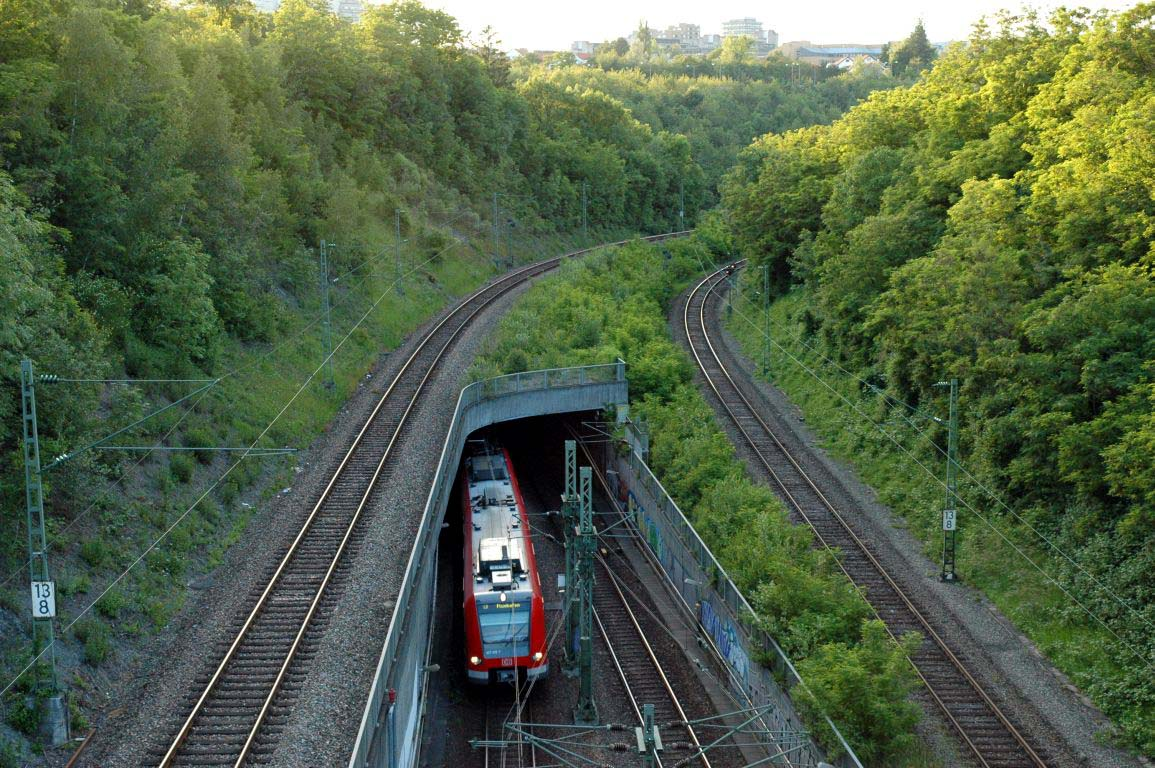
The Stuttgart–Horb railway above ground, and the 8.5 kilometer-long tunnel of the Verbindungsbahn of the S-Bahn Stuttgart

The 150 metre-long Kaufwald tunnel was converted into a cutting in nine months in the run-up to electrification in 1958/1959 with single-track operation. The cutting required the removal of 170,000 cubic metres of overburden.

After the section between Böblingen und Stuttgart was electrified in 1963, initially it was locomotives of the DRG class E 17, DB Class 141, DRG Class E 44, and DRB Class ET 55, which saw service. These were then replaced with DRG Class ET 25, DB Class ET 27, and DRG Class ET 65 by 1969. After 1974, and the electrification of the Böblingen–Horb section, the Bundesbahn used the DB Class E 10 for regional service on the line and used the same locomotive for express service after 1977. For freight service, the Bundesbahn initially relied on the DB Class E 50 and DRG Class E 93, switching to the DB Class 151 in the 1980s, then the DB Class E 40 starting in 1988; since 1993, it has been the DB Class 143 responsible for freight service.

=== Integration into the S-Bahn network ===
In 1985, the section between Stuttgart and Böblingen was incorporated into the network of the Stuttgart S-Bahn. Since then, S-Bahn services run from Stuttgart Hbf on the Verbindungsbahn (connection line), which is entirely underground in the centre of the city, and which meets up with the Stuttgart–Horb railway at Stuttgart Österfeld station. The Verbindungsbahn cuts down the trip distance of the S-Bahn by 5.5 kilometers, and puts the University of Stuttgart into the rail network, while regional and long-distance trains still use the old line, but Stuttgart West station lost its passenger service in 1985. In the run-up to the integration into the S-Bahn network, Goldberg station was opened in 1982. It is named after a residential area in Sindelfingen, but it is actually in Böblingen.

On 5 December 1992, the Deutsche Bundesbahn extended the S1 line of the Stuttgart S-Bahn from Böblingen to Herrenberg, thus significantly improving local transport between the Korngäu region and the state capital. For this purpose, Hulb station was put into operation on 8 December 1990 in Böblingen, opening up the extensive industrial area there.

=== New long-distance and local service (since 1990) ===
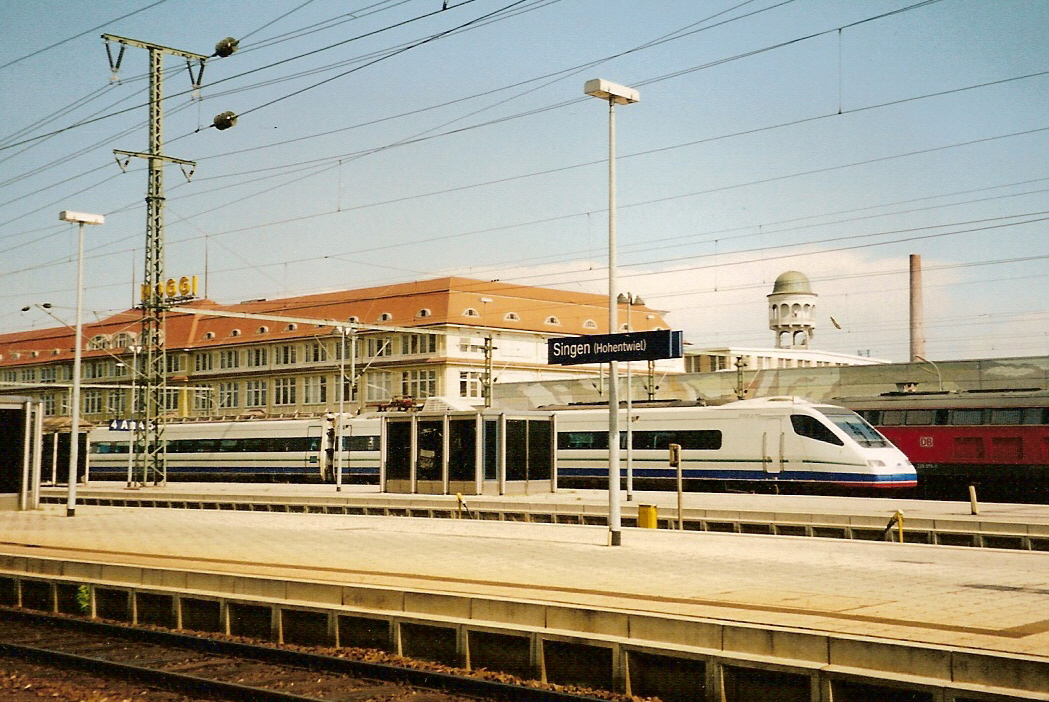
The Cisalpino in Singen in 2004

By 1991, the number of express trains on the line increased to eight daily trains, with five of those continuing on past Zürich to the cities of Milan, Genoa, and Lecce or Naples. On the other hand, traffic to the north was largely eliminated; for example, just a single express trains traveled on to Nuremberg at the time. The trip between Stuttgart and Singen now took exactly two hours, and was made by locomotives of the DB Class 110 and DB Class 181. Starting in 1993, the Deutsche Bundesbahn, and, from 1994, the privatised Deutsche Bahn AG, attempted to shorten express trip times even further. To achieve this goal, the Gäubahn saw test runs of the Italian Pendolino, as well as the Swedish X 2000. Between 1993 and 1995, two trains of the EuroCity service type replaced some of the traditional express trains on the line. For a short time, TEE-RABe trains of the Swiss Federal Railways were in use, which cut the trip time between Stuttgart and Singen to 1 hour and 50 minutes.

On 1 March 1998, two tilting trains of the type ETR 470, owned by the Swiss firm Cisalpino AG, replaced some express service trains, since German tilting technology trains were not available for service yet. This replacement did not initially result in shorter trip times. In 1999, the DB AG radically altered long-distance traffic on the Gäubahn, and stopped, with one exception, using locomotive-powered trains altogether. For the first time, trains of the type DB AG Class 415 with tilting technology were used on the line, and these trains, together with the Cisalpino, made up the bulk of long-distance trains. This resulted in a trip time of 1 hour and 44 minutes between Stuttgart and Singen. The Cisalpini were responsible for the traffic between Stuttgart and Milan, while the ICE trains carried the load between Stuttgart and Zürich; the through traffic between Stuttgart via Genoa to Naples was eliminated. In 2005, the last locomotive-powered express train, the so-called IC Insubria, was also removed. One year later, in December 2006, the Cisalpino service was stopped, eliminating direct connections to Italy, and making the ICE the only long-distance carrier on the Gäubahn.

From December 2006, ICE T sets composed of five-car sets (class 415), were replaced by seven-car sets (class 411) for ICE services.

After problems with vehicle availability and delays, ICE operations on the Stuttgart–Zürich route were discontinued on 21 March 2010 and replaced by intercity trains with Swiss Federal Railways carriages. Long-distance traffic was then operated solely with rolling stock from the Swiss Federal Railways until 2017. The ICE T would only be used again when they were allowed to travel at high speeds again, which ultimately did not happen. The Swiss Federal Railways had previously opposed attempts by Deutsche Bahn to use rolling stock from former Interregio services on the international line. In spring 2012, at a European timetable conference, Deutsche Bahn spoke out in favour of ending long-distance traffic between Stuttgart and Zürich, but failed again due to resistance from the Swiss Federal Railways.

== Operations ==
=== Long-distance traffic ===
Until the 2017/2018 timetable change, long-distance services only ran every two hours. Böblingen was not served from 2004 to 2013.

Since December 2017, Deutsche Bahn IC2 trains have been running alternately with SBB sets. This results in an hourly cycle, with the SBB trains only stopping in Böblingen, and the IC2 trains also stopping in Herrenberg, Gäufelden and Bondorf. Since then, local transport tickets have also been valid on long-distance trains. Because their class 146.5 and 147 locomotives were not approved for use in Switzerland, these journeys ended in Singen. At the edge of the day, a pair of trains also runs from or to Radolfzell. As of December 2022, DB has operated KISS multiple units with Swiss approval until the IC2 can be used in Switzerland.

=== Regional traffic ===
The addition ICE services added in 2017 replaced the Regional-Express (RE) services between Stuttgart and Singen, which had run every two hours. The RE) services between Stuttgart and Rottweil still run every two hours. These trains are split or joined in Eutingen. Going south, one half runs over the Eutingen im Gäu–Schiltach railway to Freudenstadt and the other half continues to Rottweil. Going north, these two halves are combined in Eutingen for the trip into Stuttgart. There is an hourly regional service between Stuttgart and Rottweil, since the IC trains can be used with local transport tickets. Since the changeover of the two-houlyr RE to IC2, Ergenzingen and Eutingen im Gäu have only been served every two hours from the direction of Stuttgart without having to change trains. When IC2 trains are running, trips on the Karlsruhe Stadtbahn to Bondorf serve these stops.

In 2004, the DB AG changed the train configuration on the Stuttgart–Singen route from the locomotive-hauled trains with Silberling coaches to the new DBAG Class 425 electrical multiple unit trains, which were occasionally replaced by locomotive-powered trains of the class 146, with double-decker coaches, starting in 2006. The use of class 425 sets has been greatly reduced on the Stuttgart–Singen route.

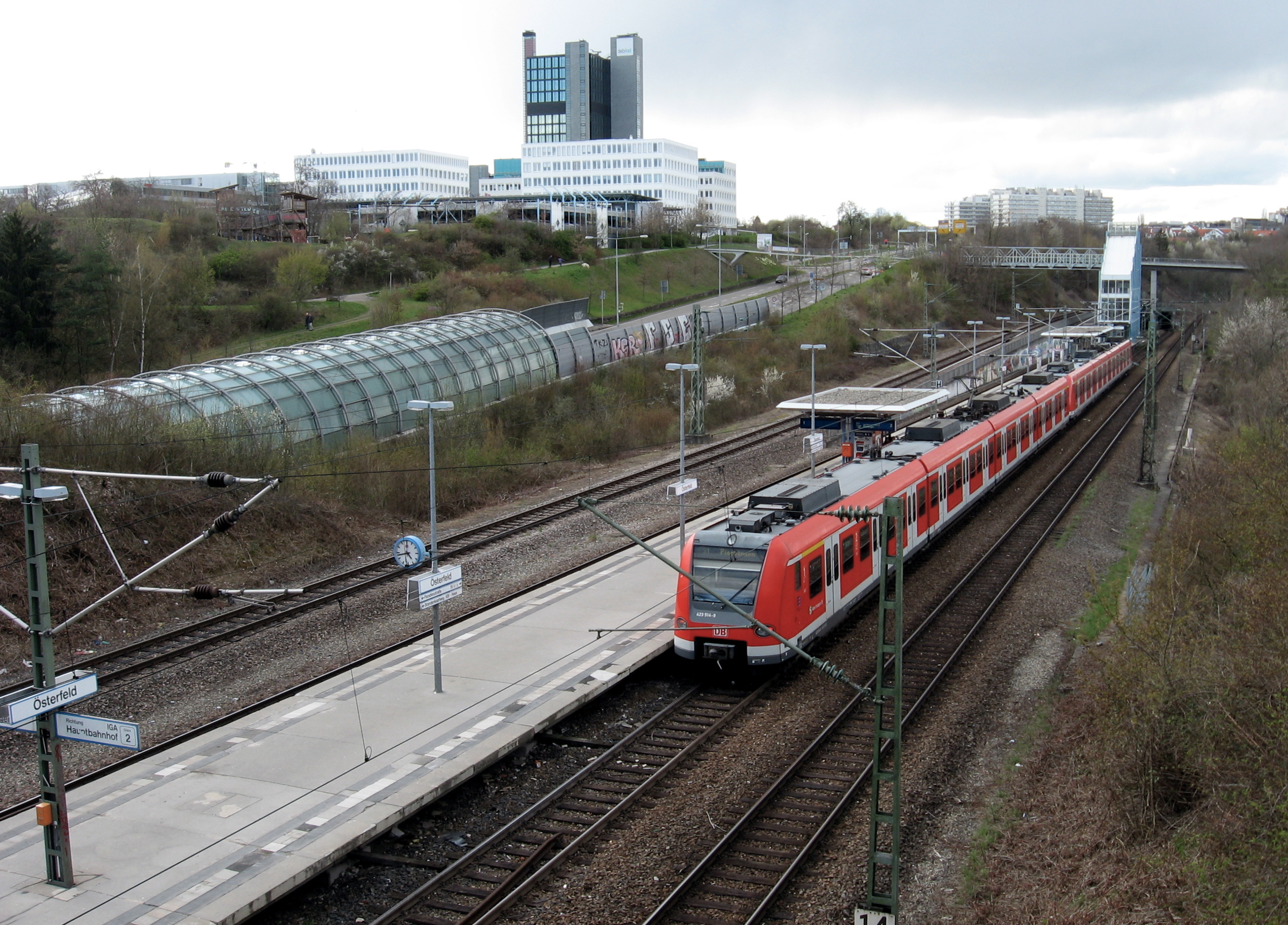
S-Bahn train in Stuttgart-Österfeld

The section between Stuttgart and Herrenberg is integrated into the Stuttgart S-Bahn network. The S 1 service runs from Herrenberg to Stuttgart-Österfeld, where the train leaves the Stuttgart–Horb and travels underground via the Verbindungsbahn to Stuttgart Hauptbahnhof. From there, the S 1 service utilises the Fils Valley Railway as far as Plochingen, before branching off to Kirchheim unter Teck the terminus of the S 1 route. The DBAG Class 423 is used on this route. The S-Bahn is also managed by the Deutsche Bahn AG, and runs every 30 minutes, except during the peak hour during the work week, where trains are available every 15 minutes. Between Herrenberg and Eutingen (some of these trains only go to Bondorf), DB AG also runs RegionalBahn trains every hour under the week, whose schedules are synchronized with the S-Bahn trains. In addition, during the work week, a train owned by the Albtal-Verkehrs-Gesellschaft travels between Freudenstadt, Eutingen, and Herrenberg, where it connects to the S-Bahn.

=== Freight traffic ===
The Gäubahn is again becoming a significant railway in terms of international freight traffic, particularly as an alternative to the heavily traveled Rhine Valley Railway, primarily as a transit route. With the exception of the connecting line to the industrial area of Böblingen-Hulb, no freight is processed for shipment directly on the line. Railion trains travel primarily from the large shunting station near Kornwestheim to St. Margrethen in Switzerland, and go around Stuttgart Hbf. This was accomplished until the 1970s via the Prag Tunnel, Stuttgart-West station and a connecting curve, but has been handled since the opening of the Stuttgart S-Bahn by running freight trains via the Rankbach Railway (Rankbachbahn) from Kornwestheim via Leonberg to Böblingen and the Stuttgart–Horb railway. Class 185 locomotives are used mostly.

== Plans for the future ==
Stuttgart 21 project

As part of the Stuttgart 21 project, it is intended to build a bypass of the tunnel-rich and steep section of the Stuttgart–Horb railway in the centre of Stuttgart. It is intended that trains on the line uses the new tunnel from Stuttgart Hbf as far as Stuttgart Airport, where it would meet the new Wendlingen–Ulm high-speed railway. Under early plans, Stuttgart–Horb trains would have connected to Stuttgart Flughafen/Messe station and continued to/from the airport towards Böblingen, taking the existing S-Bahn tracks to Stuttgart-Rohr, where they would have connected to the existing Stuttgart–Horb railway via a new Rohr connecting curve. According to the rail lobby group Pro Bahn, this new line would have extended the distance to Böblingen by 4.4 kilometres and have lengthened the trip for a Regional-Express train by five minutes. For regional and long-distance trains from Horb, this new line would have shortened the trip to the airport and no longer required a change of trains.

The route via Rohr has now been abandoned and planning is continuing using an alternative route, the Pfaffensteig Tunnel, which would be realised as a direct link from the Stuttgart–Horb route to the airport. This should merge towards Böblingen at kilometre 22. In this context, the line is to be rebuilt between route kilometres 21 and 24 (Goldberg). For the integration of the tunnel, the line is to be shifted to the north over a length of around 800 m and a flyover structure is to be built.

== See also ==
- History of the railway in Württemberg
