= Basel Connecting Line =

Swiss railway line

Overview
- Native name: Verbindungsbahn
- Locale: Basel-Stadt, Switzerland and Baden-Württemberg, Germany
- Termini: Basel SBB; Basel Bad Bf

Technical
- Line length: 4.4 km (2.7 mi)
- Number of tracks: 4 (throughout)
- Electrification: 15 kV/16.7 Hz AC overhead catenary

The Basel Connecting Line (German: Basler Verbindungsbahn) is a railway line in the Swiss city of Basel and connects Basel Baden station on the right bank of the Rhine and Basel SBB station on the left bank. It is located on Swiss territory.

Most of the German long-distance trains on the Rhine Valley Railway end at Basel SBB station and run along the Connecting Line. Many Regional-Express trains of Deutsche Bahn (from Freiburg) and S-Bahn trains of the SBB GmbH (from Zell) also run over the Connecting Line to Basel SBB.

== History ==
The railway line was authorised by Article 4 of an international agreement of 15 October 1869, concerning the construction and operation of the Gotthard Railway. The building of the Connecting Line was licensed by the Swiss federal government on 14 March 1870. On 3 November 1873 the line was opened, including a one-line bridge over the Rhine. Following an agreement between the then Swiss Central Railway and the Grand Duchy of Baden State Railways, the Connecting Line was built as a joint line by both companies. The project was exclusively funded by the Central Railway, which became its owner and it is now owned by the Swiss Federal Railways (SBB). Since the railway reform, the rail infrastructure is managed exclusively by the SBB. SBB, Deutsche Bahn and many other companies operate on the line. The property boundary is at the 3.537 km chainage mark (at the north head of the Rhine bridge).

== Technology ==
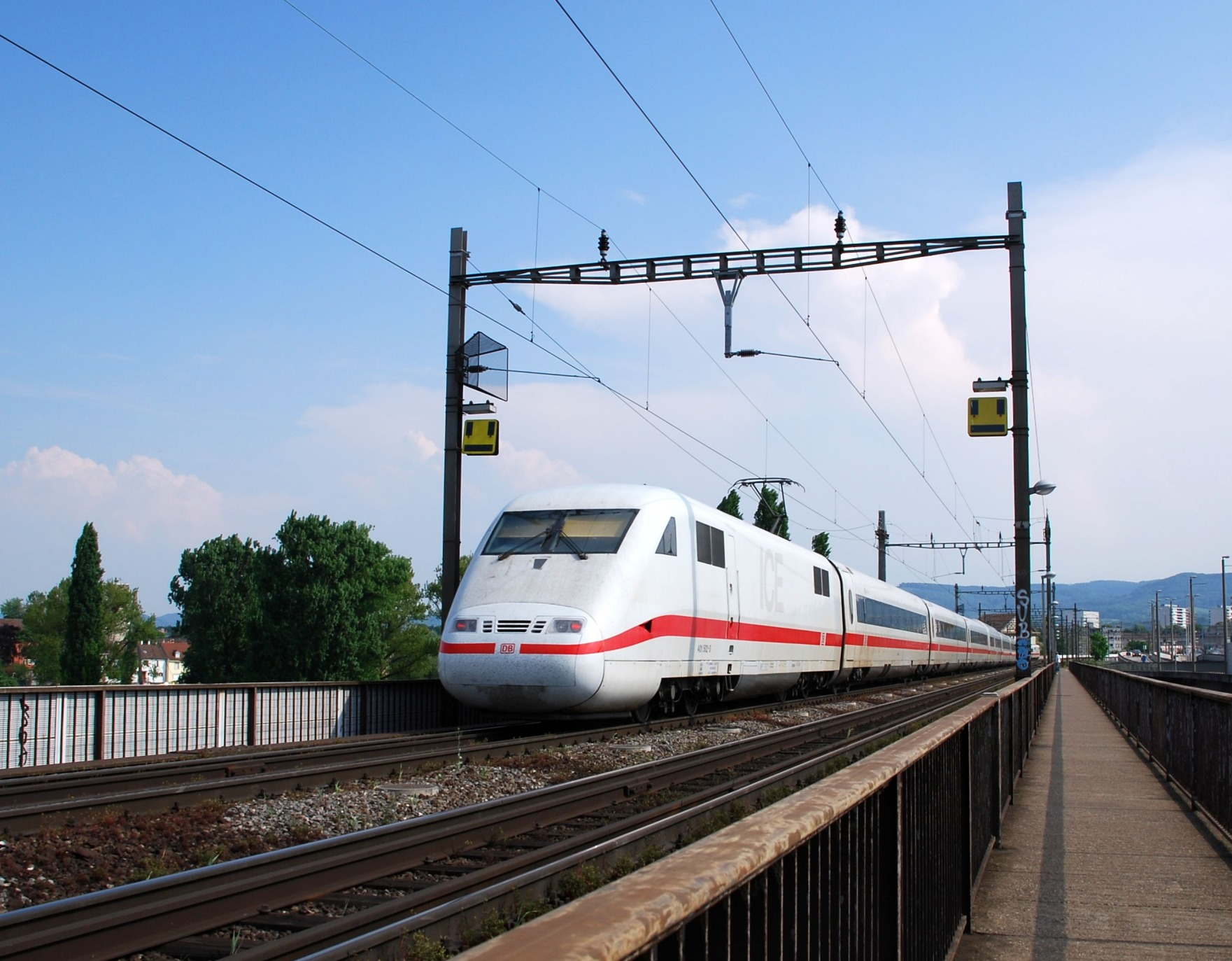
Phase separation point at the Basel connecting line bridge

The Basel Connecting Line, including railway Basel Baden station, Basel SBB station and Basel marshalling yard is equipped for Swiss locomotives without special technical equipment and can be used by services from Germany. The line is equipped with the German intermittent cab signalling system (Punktförmige Zugbeeinflussung) and the Swiss train protection system (Integra-Signum). Trains runs on the right, unlike elsewhere in the SBB network, in order to avoid the need to switch sides at Basel Baden station. The overhead line can be used by trains with both Swiss and German pantographs (maximum lateral deviation of 200 mm). The border between the overhead electrification systems is at the property boundary.
