= Stuttgart University station =

Railway station in Vaihingen, Germany

Stuttgart Universität
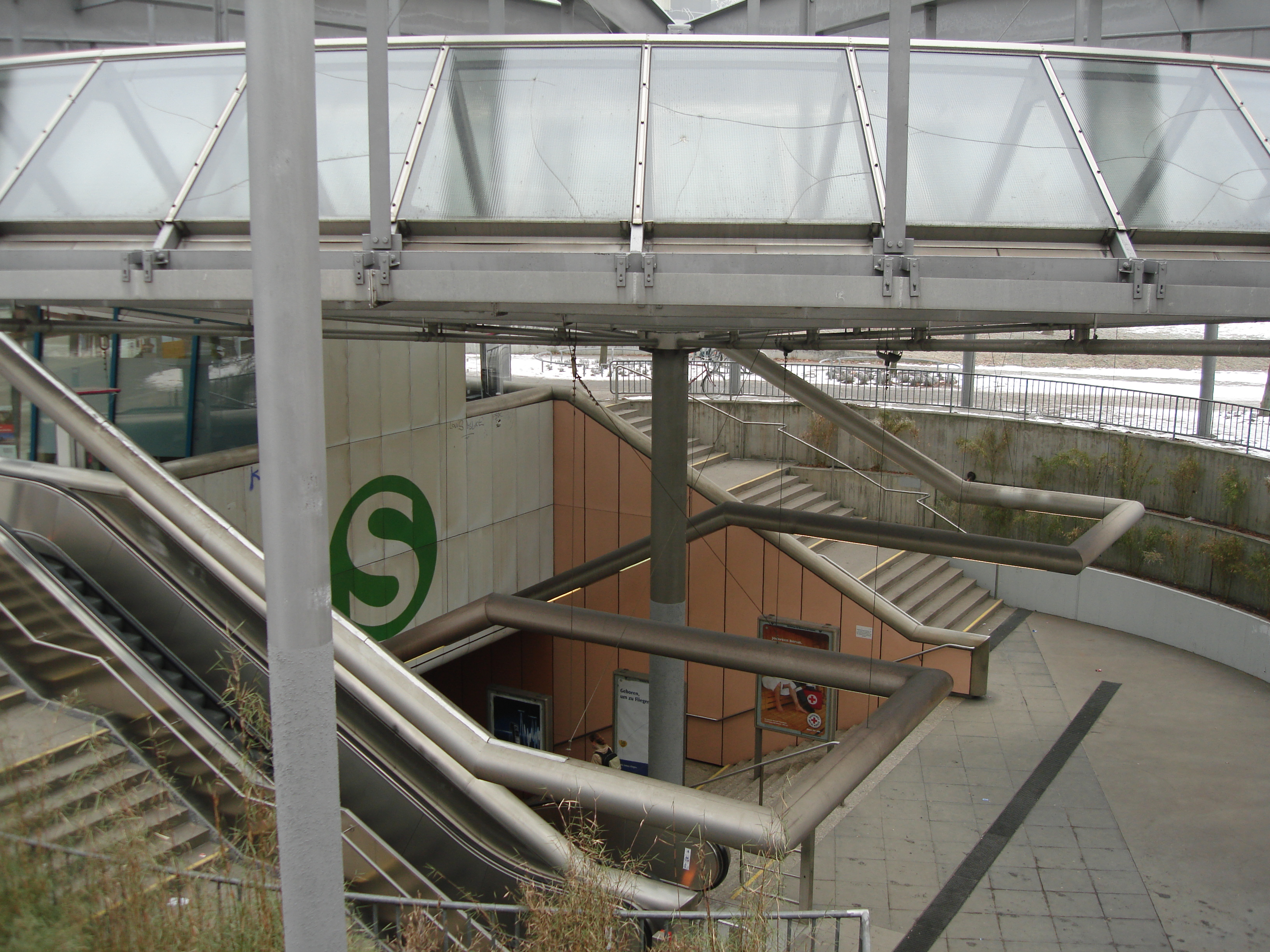
- Exit to the bus stop (University side)

General information
- Location: Universitätsstrasse, Vaihingen, Stuttgart, BW; Germany
- Coordinates: 48°44′45″N 9°6′19″E
- Owner: DB Netz
- Operator: DB Station&Service
- Lines: Verbindungsbahn (Stuttgart) (KBS 790.x)
- Platforms: 2 side platforms
- Tracks: 2
- Train operators: S-Bahn Stuttgart

Construction
- Accessible: Yes

Other information
- Station code: 6076
- DS100 code: TSUN
- IBNR: 8006513
- Category: 4
- Fare zone: : 1
- Website: www.bahnhof.de

History
- Opened: 29 September 1985

Services
Preceding station	Stuttgart S-Bahn	Following station
Österfeld towards Herrenberg	S1	Schwabstraße towards Kirchheim (Teck)
Österfeld towards Filderstadt	S2	Schwabstraße towards Schorndorf
Österfeld towards Flughafen/Messe	S3	Schwabstraße towards Backnang
Location

Stuttgart University station (German: Bahnhof Stuttgart Universität) is an underground station on the Stuttgart S-Bahn in the German state of Baden-Württemberg. It was opened on 29 September 1985 to serve the development of the Pfaffenwaldring campus of the Stuttgart University in the district of Vaihingen, an Outer District of Stuttgart. It lies on the main line of the S-Bahn. Its neighbouring stations are Stuttgart Schwabstraße and Stuttgart Österfeld (since 1993). The station has been served since its opening by lines S1, S2 and S3.

== Location ==
The station is situated on a curve with radius of 750 m and lies particularly deep, with the platforms being 21.5 m below ground level. From the platforms to the surface, three successive sets of stairs or escalators must be used. Alternatively, lifts are present. The station is located in an auditorium building of the university, which was built after the opening of the station. Universitätsstraße (University street) runs above the station, near the auditorium building. It provides a connection to federal highway 14 and the district of Büsnau. The bus stop located on the ground above the station is served by several bus lines.

In contrast to the other underground S-Bahn stations in Stuttgart, which employ island platforms, university station makes use of side platforms. The station walls, which are painted brown, reflect the university through attached motifs representing each faculty.

== Rail services ==
The interlining of S-Bahn lines S1, S2 and S3 results in a 5-minute interval service in the peak hours and a 10-minute interval service during the off-peak to Vaihingen and to Stuttgart city centre. The station is classified by Deutsche Bahn as a category 4 station.

Line	Route
S 1	Kirchheim (Teck) – Wendlingen – Plochingen – Esslingen – Neckarpark – Bad Cannstatt – Hauptbahnhof – Stadtmitte – Feuersee – Schwabstraße – University – Österfeld – Vaihingen – Rohr – Böblingen – Herrenberg (extra trains in the peak between Esslingen and Böblingen.)
S 2	Schorndorf – Weinstadt – Waiblingen – Bad Cannstatt – Hauptbahnhof – Stadtmitte – Feuersee – Schwabstraße – University – Österfeld – Vaihingen – Rohr – Flughafen/Messe – Filderstadt (extra trains in the peak between Schorndorf and Vaihingen.)
S 3	Backnang – Winnenden – Waiblingen – Bad Cannstatt – Hauptbahnhof – Stadtmitte – Feuersee – University – Österfeld – Vaihingen – Rohr – Flughafen/Messe (extra trains in the peak between Backnang and Vaihingen).
