= Verbindungsbahn (Stuttgart) =

Railway tunnel in Germany

Coordinates: 48°45′38″N 9°08′17″E

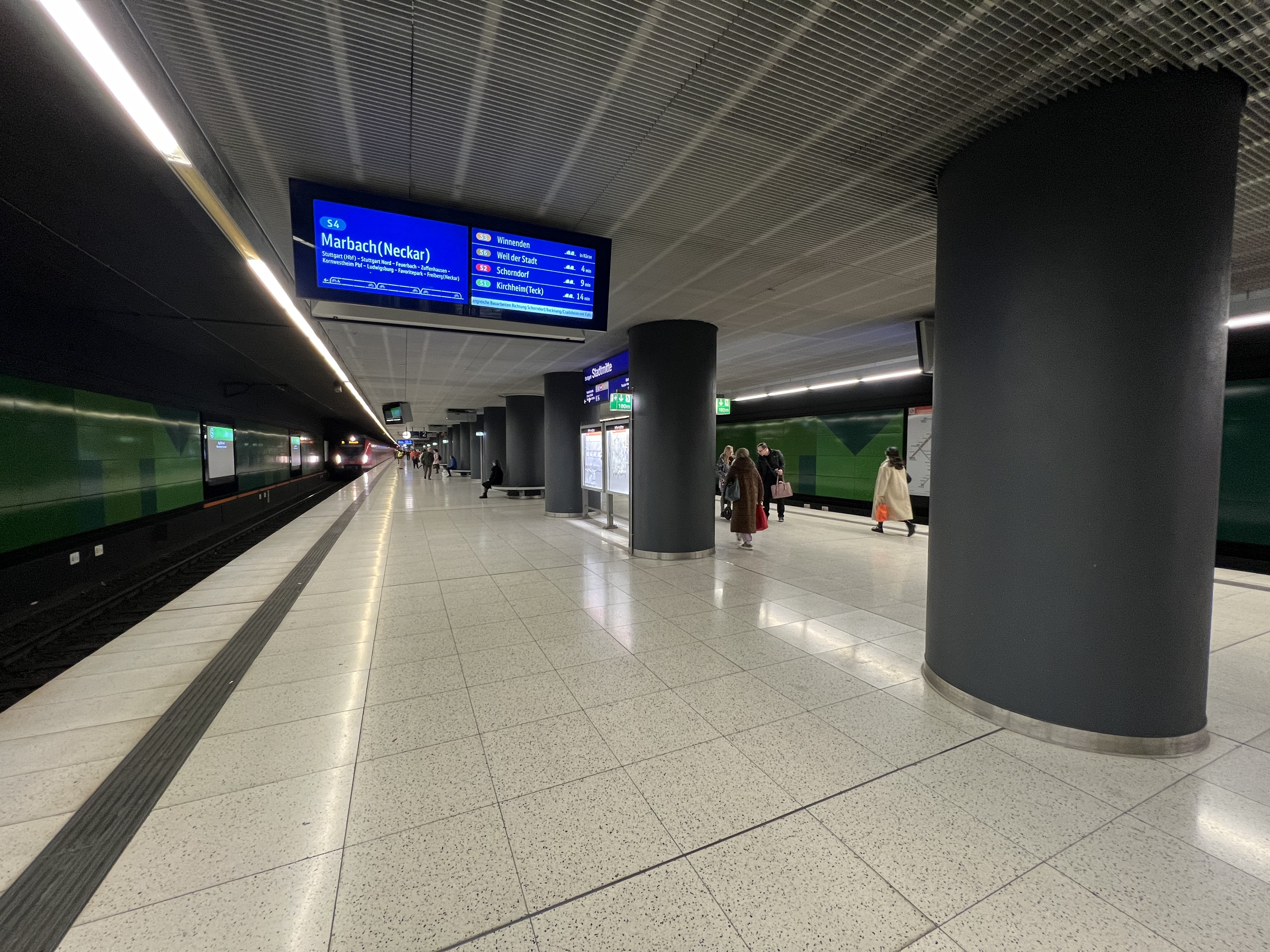
- Stadtmitte station after renovation, 2023

Overview
- Line number: 4861 (Stuttgart Hbf–Filderstadt)
- Locale: Baden-Württemberg, Germany

Service
- Route number: 790.1–6

Technical
- Line length: 9.4 km (5.8 mi)
- Track gauge: 1,435 mm (4 ft 8 1/2 in) standard gauge
- Electrification: 15 kV/16.7 Hz AC overhead catenary
- Operating speed: 100 km/h (62 mph)
- Maximum incline: 3.8%

The name Verbindungsbahn (German for connection line) is used in Stuttgart to describe the railway line between the subterranean S-Bahn Stuttgart station at Stuttgart Hauptbahnhof and the tunnel exit at the station in Stuttgart-Österfeld, which connects, via tunnel, the Stuttgart valley and the Filder plateau. The term originates from the planning stages in the 1960s, when similar projects for the S-Bahn München and S-Bahn Rhein-Main were referred to with the same term.

With a length of 8.788 km, the tunnel is the longest S-Bahn tunnel in Germany, and was the longest railway tunnel of any kind in Germany from 1985 until 1988, when the Landrückentunnel was opened for service. The tunnel is made up of two sections: the 2.6 km long section from Stuttgart Hbf to the station at Schwabstrasse, and the 5.5 km long Hasenberg tunnel, which ascends to the Filder plateau. As part of the project Stuttgart 21, the tunnel is scheduled to be extended by new underground construction, such as the new Rosenstein tunnel.

The first section of the tunnel was constructed between 1971 and 1978, mostly utilizing the cut-and-cover method of construction; only at the terminal loop and a short piece between the Hauptbahnhof and city center was the mining/boring technique of construction used. The second section, constructed between 1981 and 1985, utilized the mining method, with the exception of the station at the University of Stuttgart.

== History ==
=== Planning phase ===
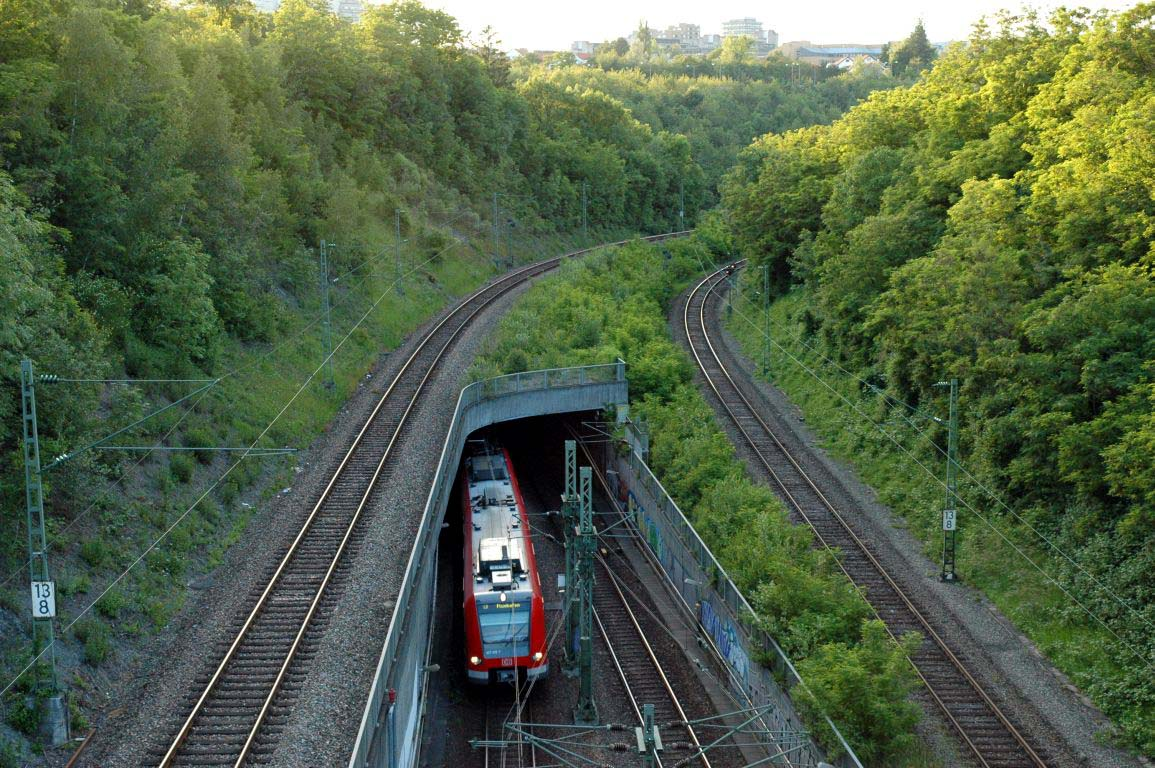
The Stuttgart–Horb railway above ground, and the 8.8-kilometre-long tunnel of the Verbindungsbahn of the S-Bahn Stuttgart

Stuttgart mayor Arnulf Klett, in a letter to Deutsche Reichsbahn dated 11 July 1949, proposed the construction of a tunnel, roughly 1.2 kilometres in length, to run between Central station and Alter Postplatz, just south of Rotebühlplatz; he also mentioned the willingness to undertake financial participation in the project by the city of Stuttgart. This tunnel was meant to absorb the suburban service utilizing electric multiple unit trains, which had started in 1933. In response, Deutsche Bundesbahn underwrote a study, which was published in 1956 in the journal Die Bundesbahn. The initial plans envisioned an extension of that line to the Stuttgart–Horb railway, which would also offer faster connections to commuters in the area to the south and southwest of Stuttgart. To achieve this, a tunnel with a grade of 50 ‰ was planned, which would have connected to the Stuttgart–Horb railway just before the former station at Wildpark, and units of DB Class ET 30 were slated for service. A new, four-track subterranean station, called Stadtmitte (city centre), was planned to be built underneath the then-under-construction Theodor-Heuss-Strasse, where half of the trains originating at Hauptbahnhof would have turned around. The station underneath Hauptbahnhof was also meant to be expanded to four tracks to enable a concept to utilize the highest possible operational efficiency; this concept was later put into operation in the S-Bahn station under the Frankfurt Hauptbahnhof. Another subterranean station, with the name Schwabstraße, was planned for the west of Stuttgart.

Initially, no progress was made in terms of the financing of the project. In 1964, the Bundesbahn published an updated planning document, which featured these differences to the study of 1956:

- the stations at Hauptbahnhof and Stadtmitte would have only three tracks
- the tunnel to connect the line to the Stuttgart–Horb railway was to be lengthened, reducing the grade to 35 ‰

In 1967, the city of Stuttgart decided not to go forward with existing plans for an underground railway line (by then labelled “U-Bahn”) parallel to the Verbindungsbahn. As a result, a new station with the name Feuersee, between Stadtmitte and Schwabstraße, was added to the plans for the Verbindungsbahn. Also, all trains originating from Hauptbahnhof were to stop at all stations to Schwabstraße, in the name of better service along the line. These changes now enabled the Bundesbahn to develop the plan for the Verbindungsbahn as it was later realized:

- Stations featuring two tracks, with an island platform between these tracks, at the stations Hauptbahnhof, Stadtmitte, Feuersee, and Schwabstraße. The Bundesbahn favored the clear arrangement and ability of passengers to change trains on the same platform.
- A terminal loop, with the ability for passing, connected to the station at Schwabstrasse. Even though this meant higher construction costs, the Bundesbahn saw this method as economically more efficient than an underground terminating track, especially in light of the many trains that were scheduled to turn around at this station.
- The reduction to two tracks made possible the relocation of the station at the Hauptbahnhof closer to the city center, underneath the narrow Lautenschlagerstrasse. This change made changing service to the Stuttgart Stadtbahn easier, shortened the walking distance to the city centre, and meant no change in getting to trains in the above-ground main line station.

=== Construction of the inner city section Hauptbahnhof–Schwabstraße ===
In May 1971, construction began to build the three subterranean levels for the Klett-Passage for pedestrians, the Stadtbahn, and the S-Bahn. On 5 July 1972, work started on the construction of new a raised track in the Hauptbahnhof apron. In April 1972, the first phase of construction on the actual Verbindungsbahn began with the construction of a tunnel underneath the tracks of the main line station, parallel to the underground passages under the main hall.

==== Hauptbahnhof ====
During the construction of the Verbindungsbahn section underneath tracks 1 through 3 of the Hauptbahnhof, no more than one main line track was scheduled to be taken out of service at any time. For this reason, a makeshift platform was constructed at the north-westerly track 1a, and the excavation pit was split lengthwise into two lateral pieces. Construction was done utilizing the cut-and-cover top-down method, where the outer shell was made up of a 28-metre-deep bored pile wall, on top of which the roof structure of the tunnel was built. The tracks and platforms where then reconstructed on this tunnel roof by May 1974, which meant the complete resumption of main line traffic. Underneath the roof structure, space was then excavated from the top down, and the inner shell was constructed, consisting of a floor and inner walls, which carried the roofs of up to three internal levels. On the topmost internal level, an underground parking garage with 120 spaces was built, which doubled as a civilian shelter, secure against airborne agents, such as poison gas, and nuclear attack, with a capacity for 4,500 persons. The inner shell was completed at the end of 1975.

The technically most challenging aspect of the construction of the Verbindungsbahn was thought to be the subterranean section, 74.6 metres long and about 25 meters wide, underneath the main building of the Hauptbahnhof, which is a protected cultural monument, in the area under the Kleine Schalterhalle (small counter hall). In deciding whether to use the mining/boring construction method, or dismantling and reconstructing parts of the building, here too the decision was made to instead utilize the top-down cut-and-cover method. To be able to move the weight of the building onto newly constructed outer support pillars, the foundation walls were surrounded by concrete sleeves, or pairs of concrete beams, which braced each other. Underneath the sleeves, horizontal beams, which rested on the new support pillars, were constructed. Once both the sleeves and beams were in place, hydraulic presses were used to put pressure onto this supporting structure, until the pressure generated equaled the weight of the building to be put on top. To complete the process, the presses were then replaced by wedges, and the resulting settling of the Kleine Schalterhalle was limited to 1 millimetre. The old building foundation was removed, the site underneath the building was excavated, and in September 1973, construction of the inner shell of the tunnel was begun.

Management of the construction process underneath the main line station forecourt, with the Klett-Passage, Stadtbahn station, and S-Bahn station, was the responsibility of the City of Stuttgart.

The section between the Hauptbahnhof and the station Stadtmitte was to be built utilizing open construction, according to the plans, where roads above the construction site would be demolished, the tunnel built, and then the road and other structures would be replaced. However, a bidding construction company suggested that a 322-metre-long section between Thouretstrasse und Fürstenstrasse should be constructed using a mining method, in a depth of 8 to 10 metres. As the most economical solution, this suggested method was used, but as it resulted in settling of over 50 centimeters in places along the section, instead of the expected settling of 5 centimetres, the sewer system and roads above the site had to be reconstructed. Utilizing the open method of construction after that point, an emergency exit was also added near the Kanzleistrasse. In June 1973, this section was the first shell section of the Verbindungsbahn to be completed.

==== Stadtmitte ====
Starting in November 1972, the station Stadtmitte, 22.5 meters wide, with a platform 12.8 metres in length, was constructed under the Theodor-Heuss-Straße, which is near the Rotebühlplatz and is 45 metres wide. The platform area was also built to be able to serve as a civilian shelter with a capacity for 4,500 people, which would be usable in case of an emergency if the S-Bahn traffic was also stopped.

Stuttgart Stadtbahn with its "U"-Logo

In addition, a crossing tunnel was constructed in advance for the Stadtbahn Stuttgart, which was taken into service on 31 October 1983. Lines U2, U4 and U14 operate there, but due to Stuttgart 21 project, lines are redirected in 2017 (now U1, U14 and U21). The western entrance to a pedestrian tunnel under the Rotebühlplatz was constructed in the inner courtyard of a new building for the Allgemeine Rentenanstalt, a public pensions institution.

==== Feuersee ====
The Verbindungsbahn continues on its way under the 23-metre-wide Rotebühlstrasse, and this section was also built using the open construction method, starting in November 1973. The existing tram line was rerouted to run on the Gutenbergstrasse, which runs parallel to the northwest of the Rotebühlstrasse, while the road traffic was rerouted to the Augustenstrasse, parallel southwest of the Rotebühlstrasse. This section of the tunnel has a lengthwise grade of 37.5 per mille, and the station at the Feuersee has a grade of 20 per mille. The Feuersee, a lake which had been built in 1701, and borders both the excavation zone as well as the Johanneskirche, was drained of all but half a metre of water during the construction phase.

==== Schwabstrasse ====
The Schwabstrasse station (German spelling: Schwabstraße) was constructed at a depth of 11 metres to 27 metres under the street surface, underneath the ground water table, which is at a depth of 6 to 8 metres. Lengthwise, this section has a grade of 1.6 per mille, and was only completed in December 1977, due to complications in the construction of the ascending terminal loop, which utilized a mining construction method.

==== Terminal loop ====
On 7 October 1974, the tunneling work began to construct the terminal loop, which is connected to the Schwabstrasse station, branching structures, and 60-meter-long sections of two single-track tubes of the Hasenbergtunnel, started in 1979, to connect to the Stuttgart–Horb railway. The front section of the terminal loop is located in depleted anhydrite, which is brittle in consistency. For this reason, and because the thin vertical cover in the area, the rock above the tunnel roof ridge was stabilized by artificially freezing the ground water (Bodenvereisung). In the rear of the terminal loop section, undepleted anhydrite posed different problems, because this mineral, when it comes in contact with water, tends to massively expand, which puts enormous pressure on the tunnel structure. For this reason, the inner shell of the tunnel in the area is up to 1 metre thick.

For the survey of the terminal loop, 40 measuring points were used. Since there was no access to the surface, the only point of reference for the survey was the station at Schwabstrasse. After tunneling for 850 meters to the right, and 900 meters to the left, the cut-through was achieved underneath the Westbahnhof, with a horizontal defect of 8 millimetres, and a vertical defect of 2 mm. The tunnel features a diameter of 6.7 metres in the single-track section, and 9.8 metres in the twin-track area. The vertical cover between tunnel and surface is 17 meters at the Schwabstrasse station, and 80 meters at the Westbahnhof.

==== Completion ====
Above the Verbindungsbahn, the two streets Lautenschlagerstrasse and Theodor-Heuss-Strasse were opened again for surface traffic in April 1977, to coincide with the Bundesgartenschau in Stuttgart that year. In March 1978, the Rotebühlstrasse, followed by the section above the Schwabstrasse station in July 1978, were returned to normal service. On 1 October 1978, S-Bahn service was officially started on the Verbindungsbahn.

=== Construction of the Hasenbergtunnel between Schwabstrasse and the Stuttgart–Horb railway ===
On 2 April 1979, the second phase of construction began. In an attempt to achieve better control over the pressure put on the tunnel by the expansion of the anhydrite material around it, the rear, 2.2 kilometer-long section of the Hasenbergtunnel, originally planned in 1967 to feature one twin-track tube, was redesigned to feature two smaller single-track tubes with an egg-shaped profile. The upper section was left to be built in single-tube, twin-track configuration with an arch profile. The redesign of the rear section also eliminated the need for the construction of an emergency exit in an area with thick vertical cover; in case of an emergency, exits to the other tube would be utilized.

The tunneling process was begun at three access points, named Heslacher Wand, Leonberger Strasse, and Magstadter Strasse. At the Heslacher Wand access point, a loading track was operated to assist in the removal of 180,000 cubic metres of excavation material from the site. In total, 396,000 cubic metres of material were removed in the section between Schwabstrasse and the station at Universität. Once the Verbindungsbahn was put into service, these access points serve as emergency exits, ventilation shafts, and smoke funnels in case of fire.

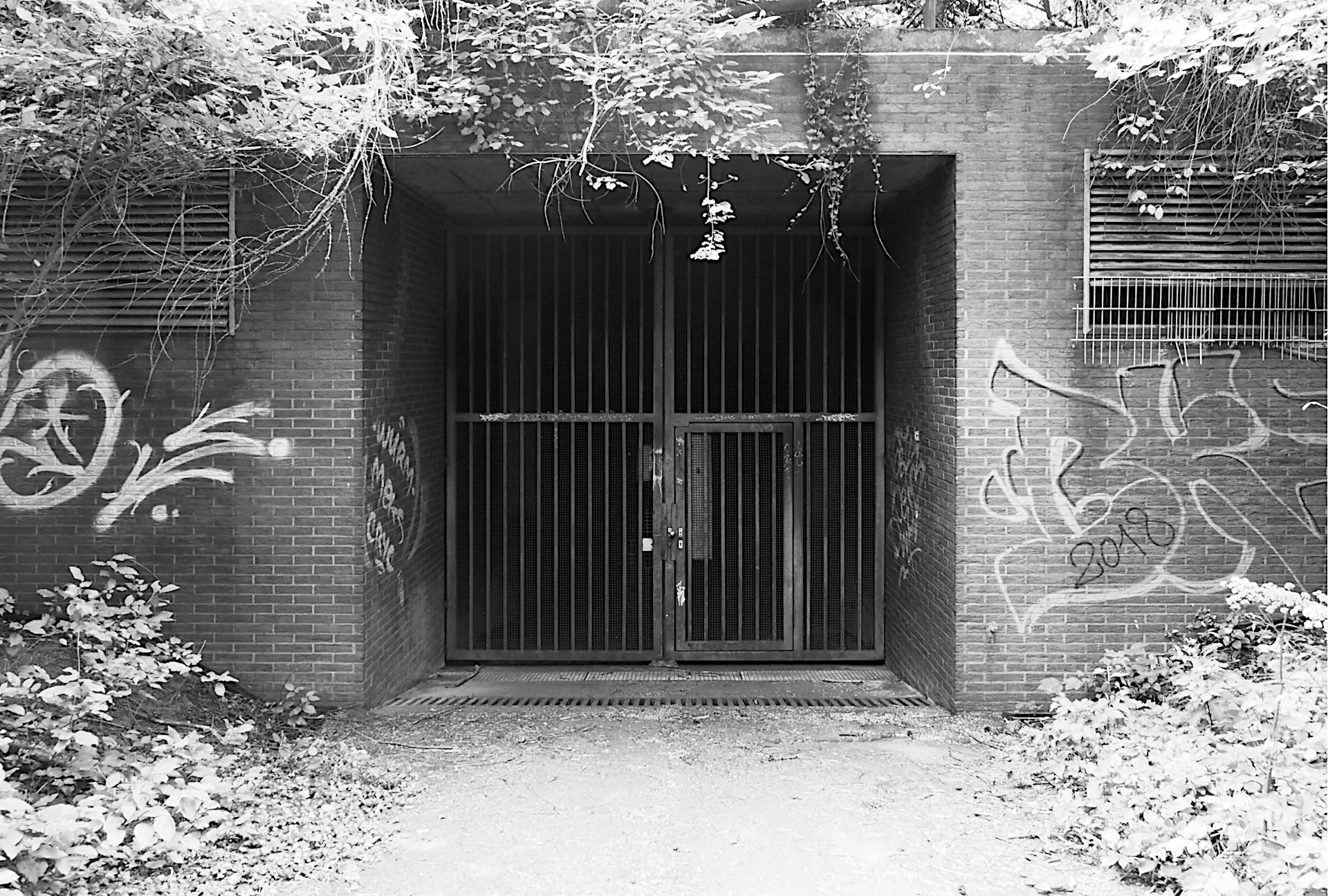
Magstadter Straße, vehicle access

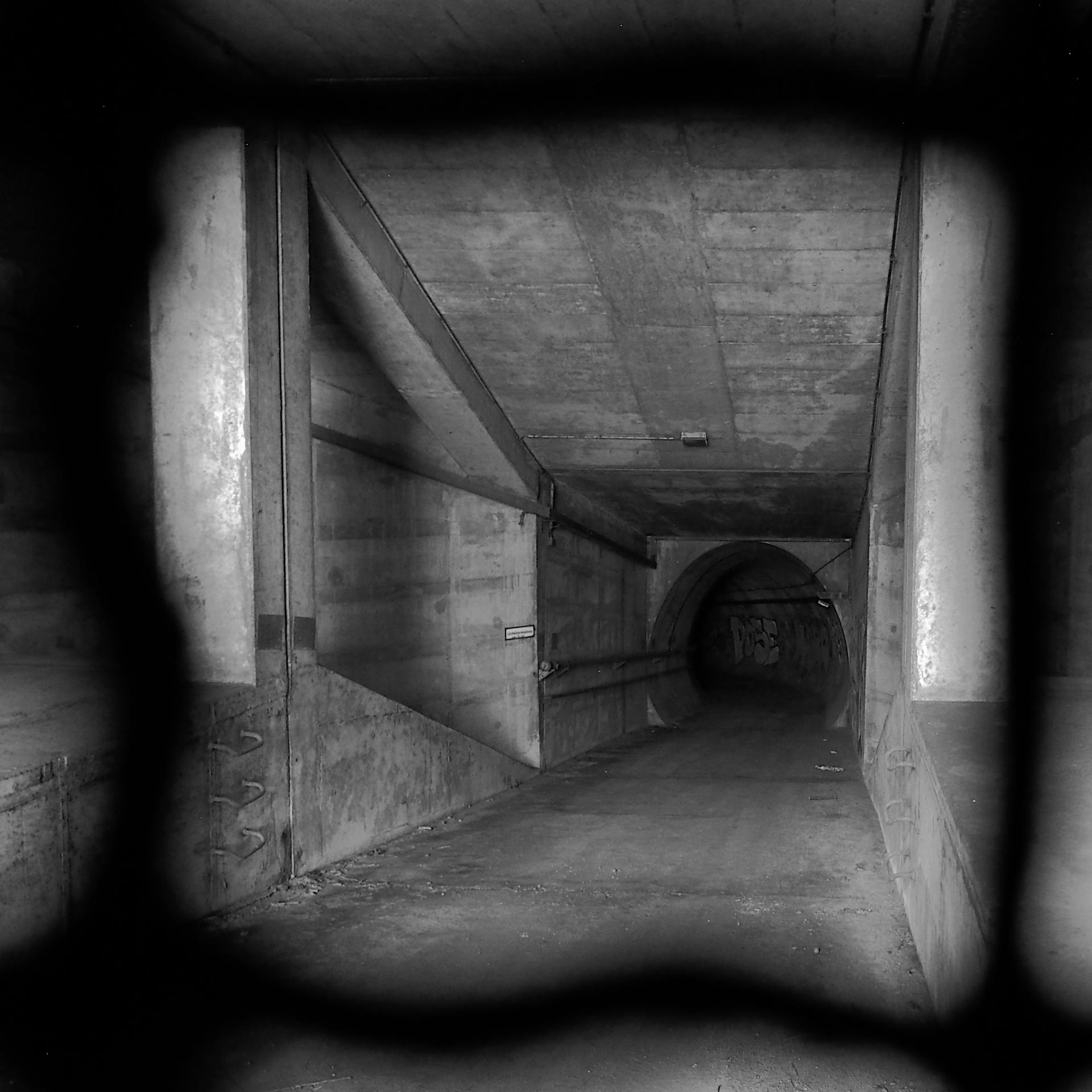
access tunnel

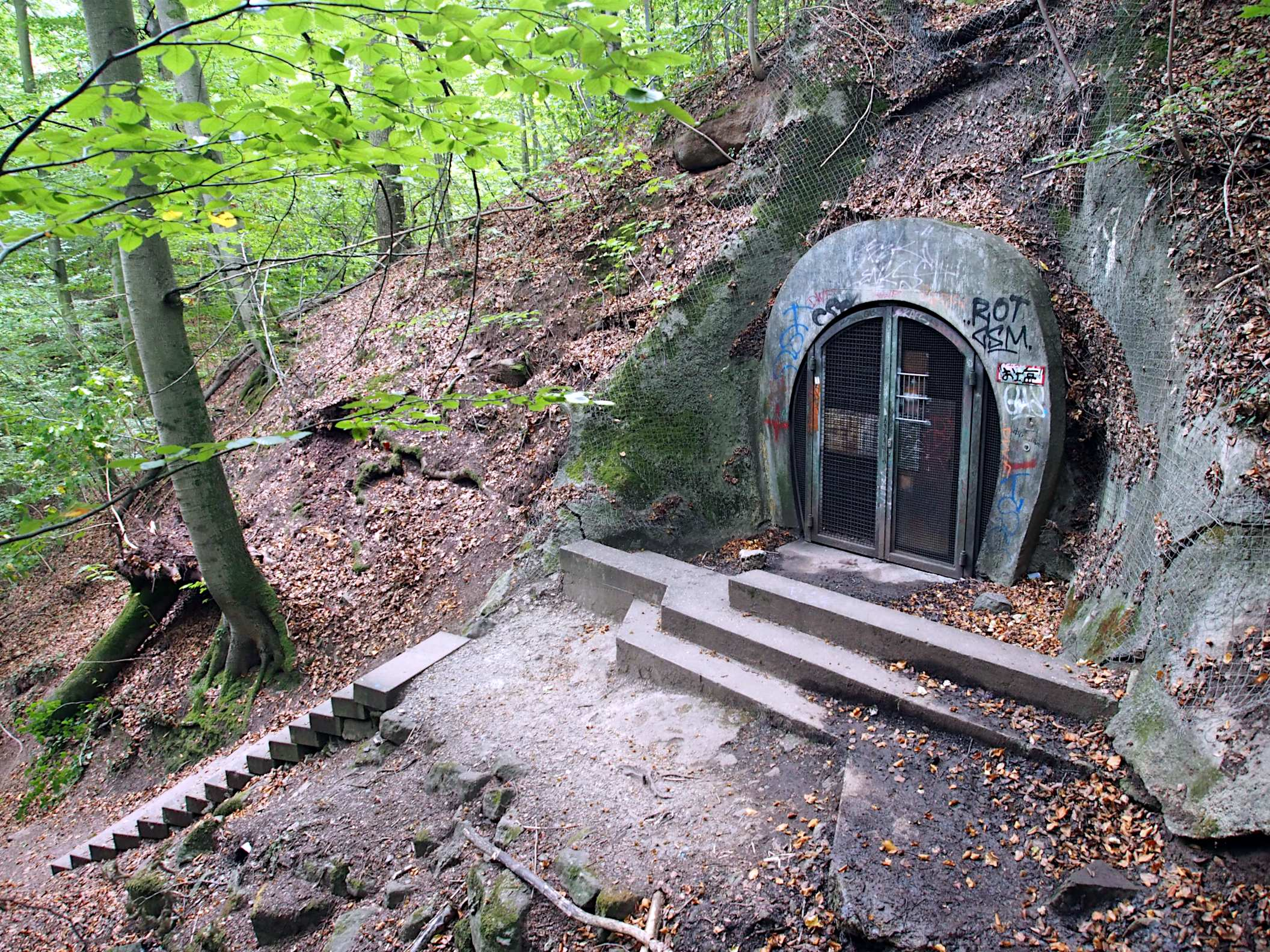
Leonberger Straße exit in rough terrain

== Operations ==
=== Main S-Bahn section ===
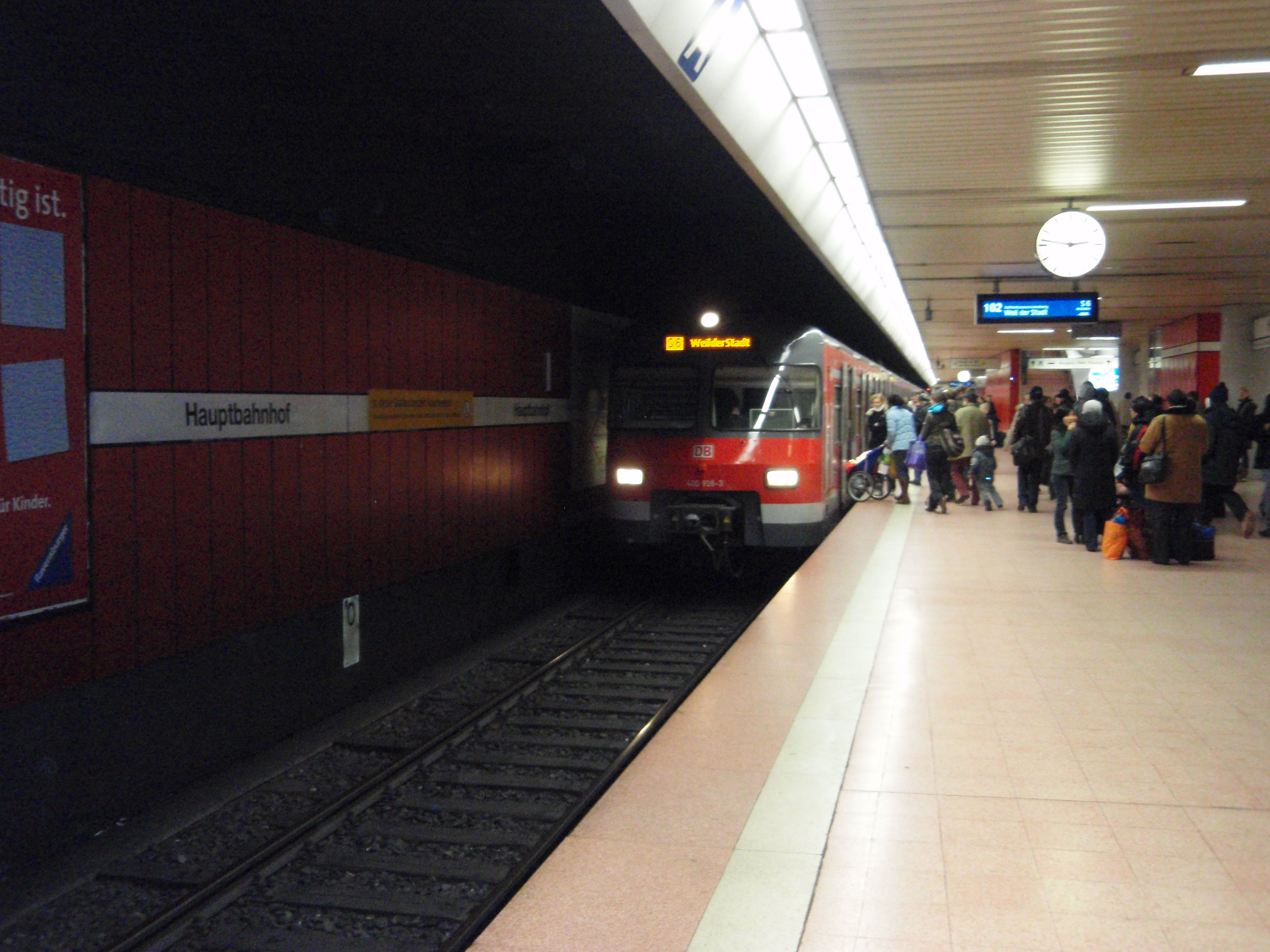
The S-Bahn station Stuttgart-Hauptbahnhof in 2008

The section between the stations at the Hauptbahnhof and Schwabstraße is the main section of the S-Bahn network, and is served by all 7 S-Bahn routes. With the exception of two early-morning trains, which begin or end at Hauptbahnhof, all S-Bahn trains traverse this entire section. S-Bahn trains branch off from the main line tracks in the apron area of the main line station, and are routed underground through separate tunnel entrances into the S-Bahn station Hauptbahnhof.

Connected to Schwabstraße station is a subterranean terminal loop, which enables the trains of the routes S 4, S 5, S 6 and S 60, which terminate there, to turn around. This terminal loop features a twin-track section, which, in the early years, housed a reserve S-Bahn train; today the 2nd track serves as a passing track, so that the train sequence can be normalized in case of any operational anomalies.

The top speed on this section is 60 kilometres per hour (km/h), and 50 km/h in the area of the terminal loop. Railway signals of the type H/V (Haupt-/Vorsignal, home/distant signal), are present in pre-determined intervals, which allow trains to follow each other in distances of 400 to 700 metres, or 1.9 minutes. In addition to the usual PZB train protection system, speed detection zones are also installed.

=== Hasenberg tunnel ===
After the station at Schwabstraße, the line connects to Hasenberg tunnel. This tunnel initially runs in a straight line under the eponymous Hasenberg and Glemswald, until, after about 5 kilometers, it approaches University station, named for the Vaihingen campus of the University of Stuttgart, after completing a curve of about 500 metres radius. The grade ascends at 35 ‰ to the station, then descends at 38 ‰ and emerges to surface level before the station at Österfeld, in between the tracks of the Stuttgart–Horb railway. The tunnel is very close to the building developments on the surface before emerging, and a shock-absorbing system (Masse-Feder-System) is utilized to minimize the ground vibrations caused by the trains.

Until November 2004, the top speed permitted in the Hasenbergtunnel was 80 km/h, but since then, S-Bahn trains going in the ascending, i.e. outbound direction, may travel at 100 km/h.

=== Stations ===
The five stations of the Verbindungsbahn each feature their own color to make station identification easier for passengers:

- Hauptbahnhof (tief - low level): red
- Stadtmitte: green
- Feuersee: blue
- Schwabstraße: yellow
- Universität: brown

At the station Hauptbahnhof (tief), the tracks were originally labelled as Track 1 and 2, but were later changed to Track 101 and 102, which eliminated the possibility of mistaking these tracks with the main line tracks aboveground. In all other stations, tracks are labeled as Track 1 and 2. The stations from Hauptbahnhof to Schwabstrasse feature island platforms, and the station at Universität has two side platforms. The stations at Hauptbahnhof, Stadtmitte, and Schwabstrasse are staffed by station supervisors around the clock, while the stations at Feuersee and Universität do not, or no longer, have personnel present at any time.

All stations except for Feuersee, which features a grade of 20 ‰, are level. The station at Schwabstrasse features the longest escalator in the S-Bahn system, with a length of 37 metres.

== Scheduled expansion ==
As part of the project Stuttgart 21, the S-Bahn tracks between Hauptbahnhof and Bad Cannstatt are scheduled to be renewed and expanded. This would mean the following:

- New construction of an underground route between Hauptbahnhof and a new S-Bahn station named Mittnachtstraße.
- New construction of a two-track station (to serve as a transfer point) at Mittnachtstraße, northeast of Hauptbahnhof.
- New construction of the Rosensteintunnel between Hauptbahnhof and Mittnachtstraße
- New construction of the railway bridge over the Neckar river

These new construction and expansion plans would make the length of the Verbindungsbahn tunnel about 11 kilometres, and it would again become the longest railway tunnel in Germany.
