= Verbindungsbahn =

A Verbindungsbahn (link line, connecting line, junction line) is in German language a railway line that links stations or lines, in some cases of different railroad companies, sometimes bypassing specific stations. Its most simple form is a Umgehungsbahn (bypass railway). A Verbindungsbahn can often be found near Terminus stations (Kopfbahnhof in German), interlinking them in large cities with several terminus stations. Sometimes the Verbindungsbahn is also called Stammstrecke (lit. original line). The term can also be found in other European languages in a similar form. As an abbreviation for Verbindungsbahn sometimes V-Bahn is used.

== Examples ==
Examples for a Verbindungsbahn are:

=== Germany ===
- Verbindungsbahn (Berlin)
- Verbindungsbahn (Frankfurt)
- Verbindungsbahn (Hamburg)
- Stammstrecke (München)
- Verbindungsbahn (Stuttgart)

=== Austria ===
- Verbindungsbahn (Vienna)

=== Switzerland ===
- Verbindungsbahn (Basel)
