= Debitel =

German telecommunications company

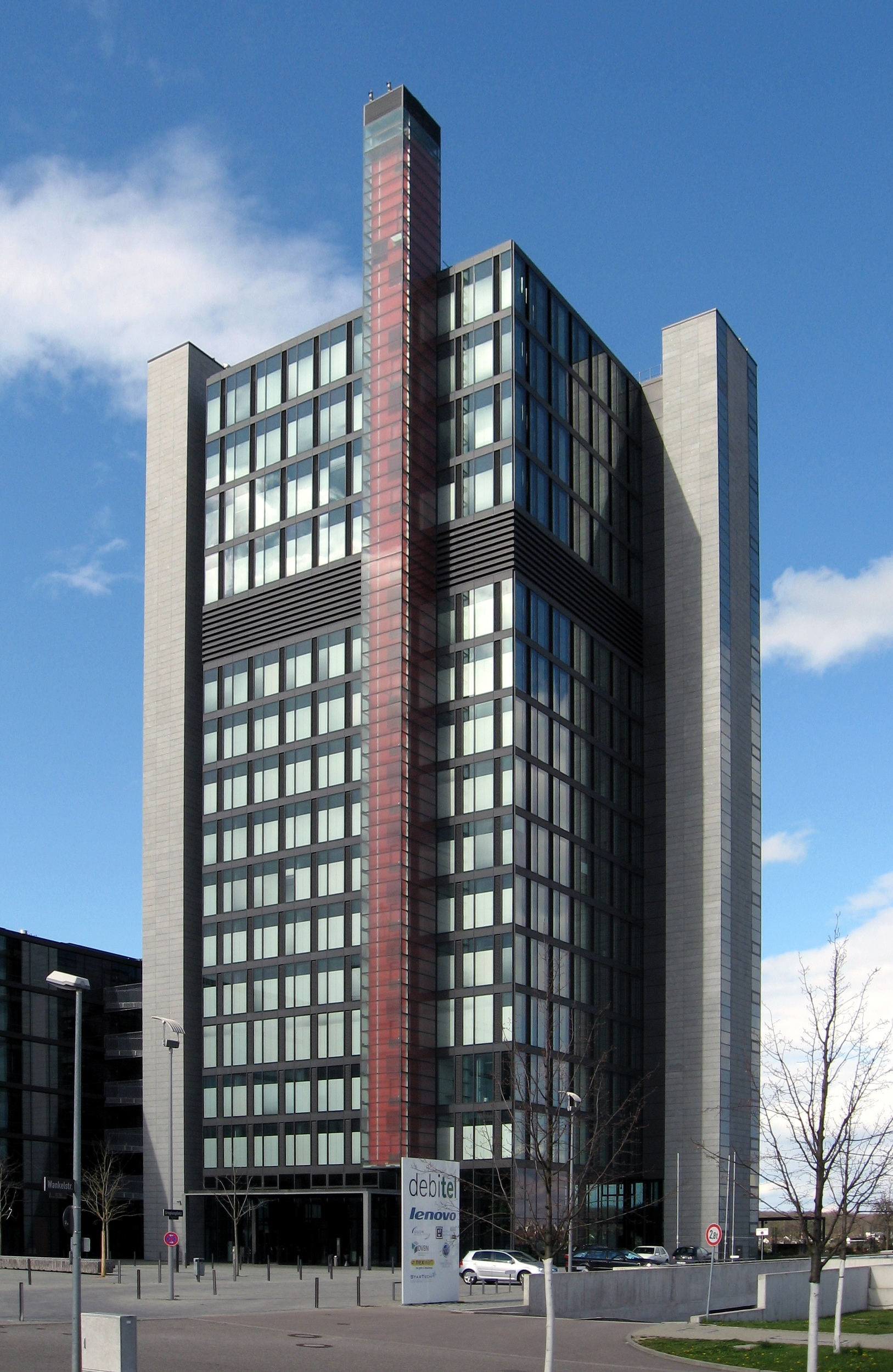
debitel headquarters in the Vaihingen district of Stuttgart

Debitel AG was one of the largest mobile telephone services providers in Europe, offering a wide range of telecommunication products – mobile and land-line telephony as well internet services. At its peak, the business commanded a 47% market share of the mobile service provider market in Germany (its largest market) with 12.4% of the overall mobile telephone market as of 2004. The company boasted over 10.2 million customers of which 8.3 million were resident in Germany.

The company was founded in 1991 by Debis, a subsidiary of German car maker Daimler Benz before being sold in 2004 to a German holding company of Swiss telecommunications giant Swisscom.

== Takeovers and mergers ==
In June 2004, Permira, an international private equity firm, acquired Swisscom's 95% stake in Debitel.

In 2006 it was announced that Debitel would merge with _dug telecom AG, a German telecommunications company with 430 outlets of its own which had been founded in 1993 as a mobile telephone direct sales company called ‘Dittrich und Grella’.

Including the 1100 employees of _dug, by March 2008 the merged company employed 4000 people. In October 2008 the company owned 500 outlets in Germany, marketing what are known in Germany as 'tariff-based' products under the Debitel brand on behalf of network providers such as T-Mobile, E-Plus and O_{2}. debitel also sold land-line services at this time for Deutsche Telekom's T-Home brand, Arcor, O_{2} DSL, Alice (a German brand owned by Telecom Italia) and Freenet.

In July 2007 Debitel was granted permission by the EU Commission to take over Elmshorn-based telecommunications company Talkline.

Debitel subsequently consolidated the administration of the merged companies and downsized human resources leading to the loss of 700 jobs at Talkline and the announcement that Talkline operations would close entirely by 2010.

In April 2008, Freenet AG announced it would purchase Debitel from Permira including all liabilities for approx. 1.6 billion euros.

== Sponsorship ==
Between 1999 and 2005, Debitel was the main kit sponsor of German football club VfB Stuttgart.
