= Prussian P 10 =

Class of 260 German 2-8-2 locomotives

Prussian P 10 DRG Class 39 PKP class Pt1
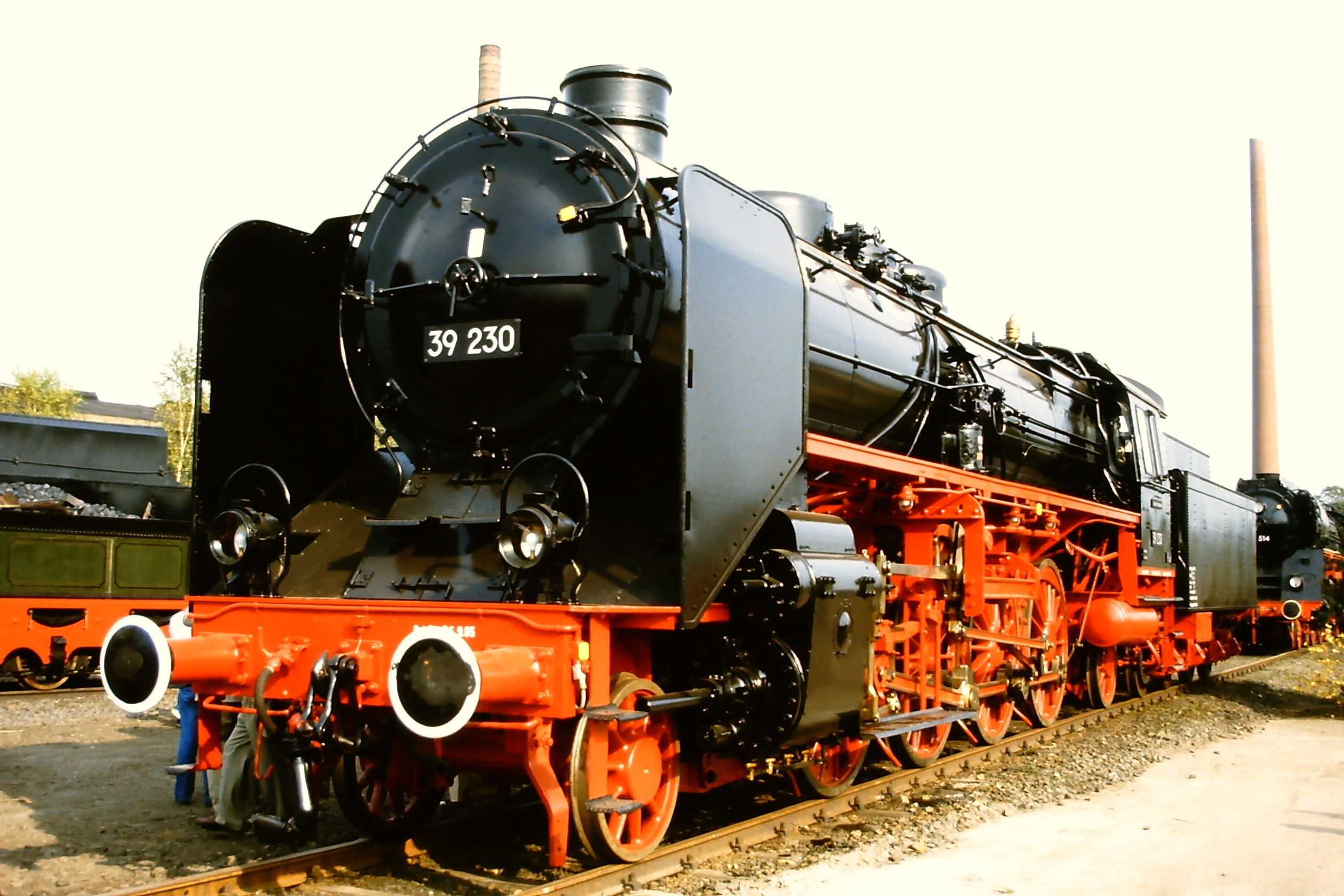
- 39 230 in Bochum-Dahlhausen (5.10.1985)
Type and origin
- Builder: Borsig (93); Henschel & Sohn (78); Krupp (29); Hanomag (19); Linke-Hofmann (17); MBG Karlsruhe (24)
- Build date: 1922–1927
- Total produced: 260
Specifications
  - German: P 46.19
- Gauge: 1,435 mm (4 ft 8 1/2 in)
- Leading dia.: 1,000 mm (3 ft 3 3/8 in)
- Driver dia.: 1,750 mm (5 ft 8 7/8 in)
- Trailing dia.: 1,100 mm (3 ft 7 1/4 in)
- Wheelbase
  - Overall: 11,600 mm (38 ft 1 in)
- Length
  - Over beams: 22,890 mm (75 ft 1 1/4 in)
- Axle load: 19.4 tonnes (19.1 long tons; 21.4 short tons)
- Adhesive weight: 75.7 tonnes (74.5 long tons; 83.4 short tons)
- Empty weight: 100.4 tonnes (98.8 long tons; 110.7 short tons)
- Service weight: 110.4 tonnes (108.7 long tons; 121.7 short tons)
- Water cap.: 31.5 m^{3} (6,900 imp gal; 8,300 US gal)
- Boiler
- No. of heating tubes: 138
- No. of smoke tubes: 34
- Boiler pressure: 14 kgf/cm^{2} (1.37 MPa; 199 lbf/in^{2})
- Heating surface
  - Firebox: 4.08 m^{2} (43.9 sq ft)
  - Tubes: 122.30 m^{2} (1,316.4 sq ft)
  - Evaporative: 217.01 m^{2} (2,335.9 sq ft)
- Superheater
  - Heating area: 77.20 m^{2} (831.0 sq ft)
- Cylinders: 3
- Cylinder size: 520 mm (20 1/2 in)
- Piston stroke: 660 mm (26 in)
Performance figures
- Maximum speed: 110 km/h (68 mph)
- Indicated power: 1,620 PS (1,190 kW; 1,600 hp)
Career
- Numbers: DRG: 39 001 – 39 260; PKP: Pt1-1 – Pt1-11
- Retired: 1967
- Disposition: Two preserved (39 184, 39 230), remainder scrapped

The Prussian state railways' Class P 10 were 2-8-2 "Mikado" type passenger-hauling steam locomotives built for hauling heavy express trains in the hilly terrain of the Mittelgebirge. They were the last Prussian passenger train steam locomotives to be developed in Prussia before the state railways were merged into the Deutsche Reichsbahn (German Imperial Railway), who eventually designated them as DRG Class 39.

The design by Borsig, under the supervision of chief engineer August Meister, was ready in 1919 but, due to material shortages, no locomotives were produced until 1922. They were three-cylinder locomotives, all cylinders driving the second coupled axle. Three sets of Walschaerts valve gear were used, the one for the inside cylinder being mainly located inside the frame, but driven from the same eccentric crank as the valve gear on the left-hand side; two eccentric rods of different lengths being attached to the same crank.

The locomotives' heavy axle-load exceeded the 17 tonne standard specification of much of the German rail network, so they were limited to specific lines which were constructed to higher standards. A total of 260 of these locomotives were ultimately constructed and they worked primarily on the Main-Weser-Bahn between Frankfurt and Kassel, as well as the Eifel region, the Black Forest network until their replacement by Class 221 diesel locomotives, and the Gäubahn. They were the most powerful of all the state railway passenger locomotives.

The vehicles were originally equipped with Prussian 2'2' T 31,5 tenders. The Deutsche Bundesbahn fitted many of the surviving examples with Witte smoke deflectors and 2'2' T 34 tenders. The last three engines were stabled in Stuttgart and taken out of service in 1967.

39 184 is displayed in a museum located on the grounds of Alstom Transport Deutschland in Salzgitter, Germany. The museum is not accessible to the public.

The DB Museum owns 39 230, which may be viewed currently at the German Steam Locomotive Museum.

In the East German Deutsche Reichsbahn the Prussian P 10 was indispensable and was therefore included in their reconstruction programme. The 85 Rekoloks were grouped into DR Class 22.

== See also ==
- Prussian state railways
- List of Prussian locomotives and railcars
- List of preserved steam engines in Germany
