= Malmsheim station =

Railway station in Renningen, Germany

Malmsheim
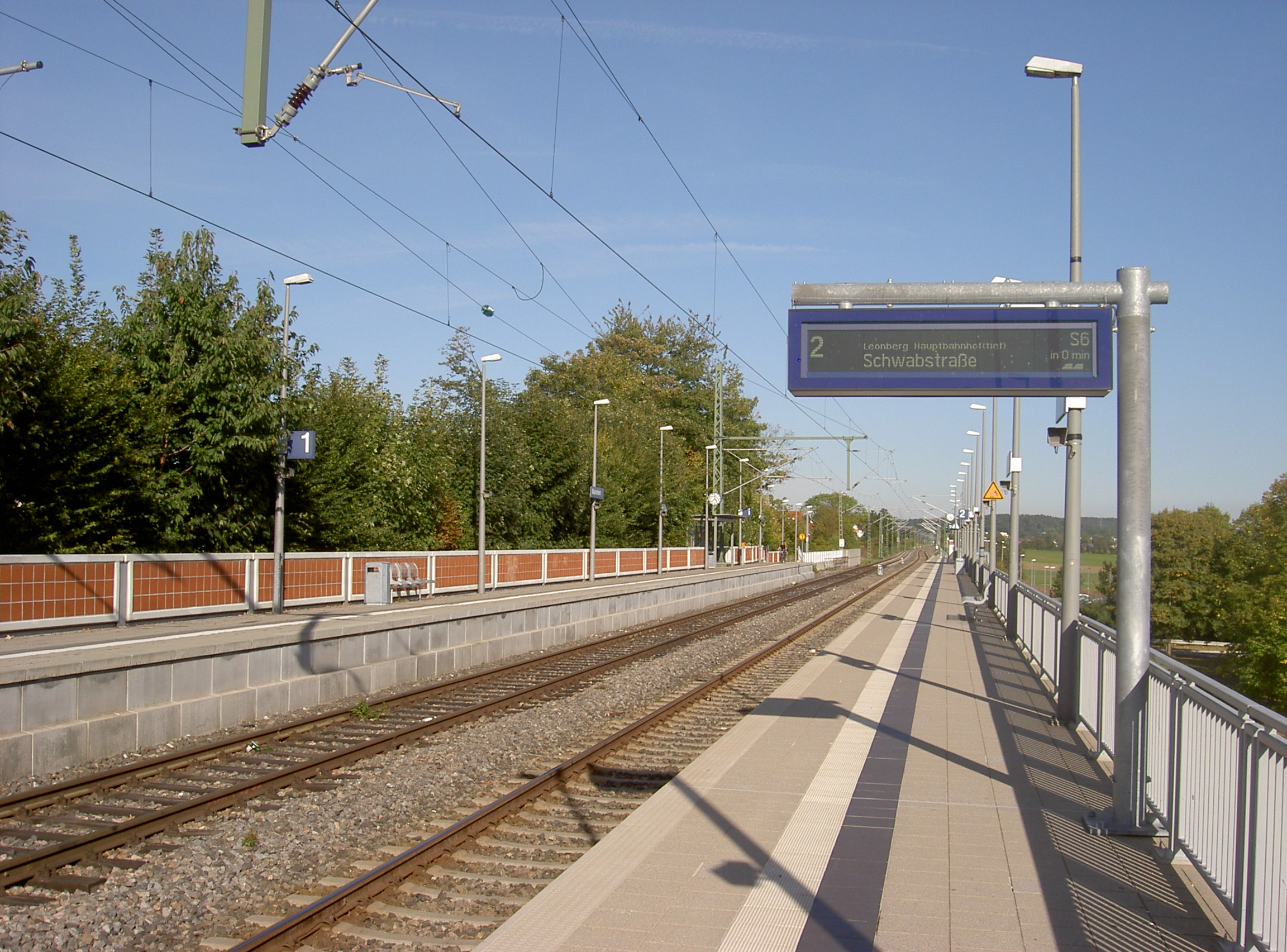

General information
- Location: Alte Bahnhofstraße, Renningen, Baden-Württemberg; Germany
- Coordinates: 48°46′18″N 8°54′16″E
- Line: Black Forest Railway (KSB 790.6)
- Platforms: 2

Construction
- Accessible: Yes

Other information
- Station code: 3916
- DS100 code: TMAL
- IBNR: 8003831
- Category: 5
- Fare zone: : 4
- Website: www.bahnhof.de

History
- Opened: 1 December 1894
Location

Malmsheim station is in the town of Malmsheim in the municipality of Renningen in the German state of Baden-Württemberg. It is located at kilometer 22.4 of the Black Forest Railway and it is served by line S 6 of the Stuttgart S-Bahn.

== History ==
On 1 December 1869, the Royal Württemberg State Railways opened the line between Ditzingen and Weil der Stadt, the second section of the Black Forest Railway from Zuffenhausen to Calw. The line ran between Renningen and Weil der Stadt through the Malmsheim district, close to the village. Although Malmsheim already had over 1,000 people, it still had no station. The State Railways only agreed to build a station when the municipality agreed to provide 3,403 gold marks for the construction of a wooden, one-story building with a ticket office and waiting room. It was situated on the railway crossing on the road to Weil der Stadt and opened on 1 December 1894.

Agriculture in Malmsheim declined in the 1920s and 1930s. Many people from Renningen and Malmsheim found new jobs mainly in Sindelfingen and Böblingen. In order to help the commuters to get to work, the two municipalities called on the Deutsche Reichsbahn railway division (German: Reichsbahndirektion) of Stuttgart to provide denser services on the Rankbach Railway. But the railway division refused. It also did not approve the conversion of the Malmsheim entrance building to increase the waiting room and it rejected a proposal of establishing a freight-handling facility.

To improve transport in the district of Leonberg (Landkreis Leonberg), Deutsche Reichsbahn extended electrical operations from Leonberg to Weil der Stadt on 18 December 1939. The concept of developing the Stuttgart S-Bahn out of the suburban railway evolved in the 1960s. As a result, Deutsche Bundesbahn created an underpass to replace the Calwer Straße level crossing. Since 1 October 1978, line S 6 of the S-Bahn has run between Schwabstraße and Weil der Stadt. In late 1979, the entrance building, which was no longer used, was demolished.

On 19 October 2003, Deutsche Bahn AG opened a second track between Renningen and the new crossover at Rankmühle, south of Malmsheim. For this purpose, it also extended the station and created new courses for Calwer Straße and the Rankbach stream.

== Rail services ==
The station is served by line S 6 of the Stuttgart S-Bahn. Track 1 is used for services to Weil der Stadt, and track 2 is used for services to Renningen.

The station is classified by Deutsche Bahn as a category 5 station.

=== S-Bahn ===
Line	Route
S 6	Weil der Stadt – Malmsheim – Renningen – Leonberg – Zuffenhausen – Hauptbahnhof – Schwabstraße (additional services in the peak between Leonberg and Schwabstraße)
