= Rutesheim station =

Railway station in Leonberg, Germany

Rutesheim
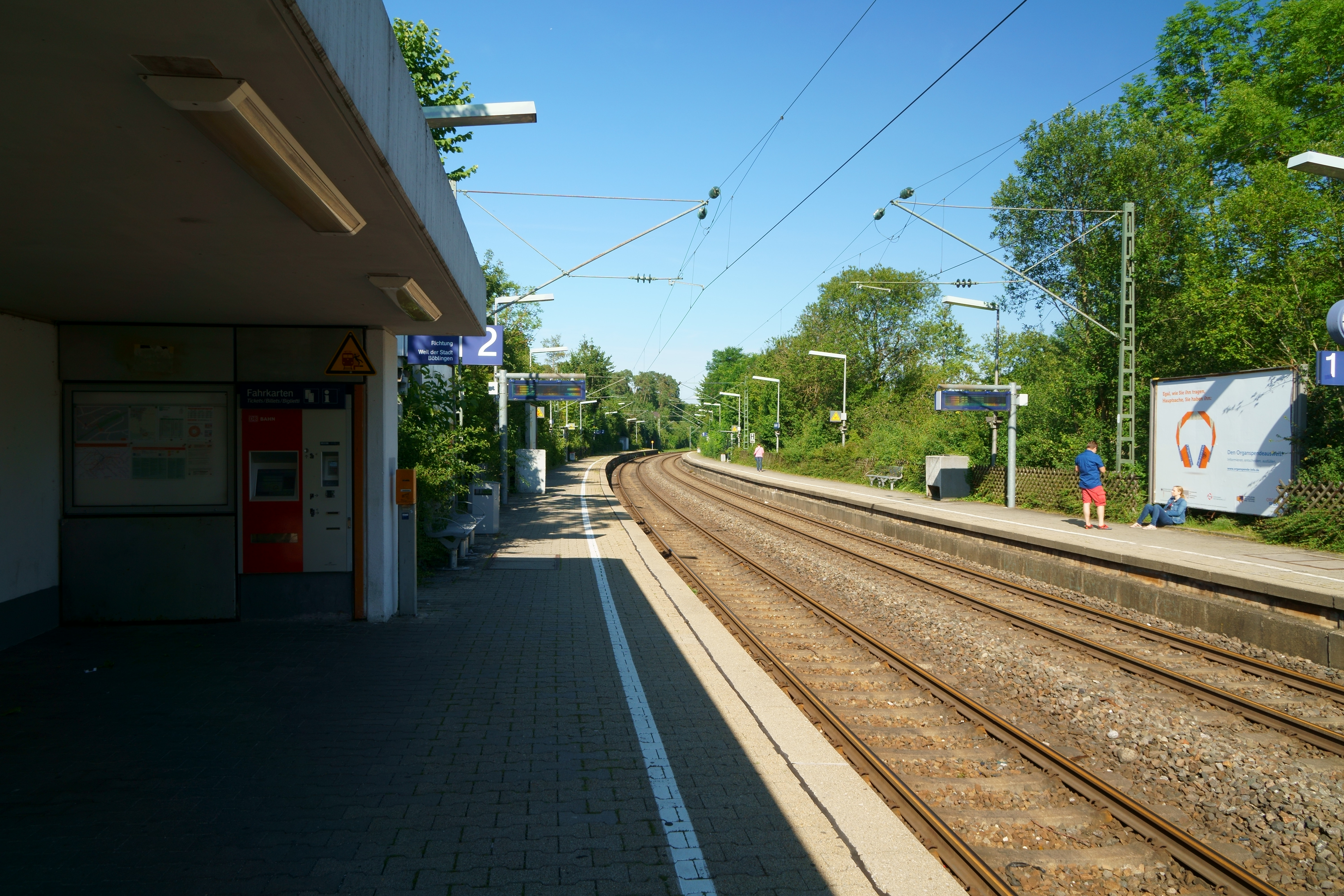
- 2019

General information
- Location: Bahnhofstraße/Wasserbachstraße; 71229 Rutesheim; Baden-Württemberg; Germany
- Coordinates: 48.7904°N 8.9606°E
- System: Hp
- Owner: Deutsche Bahn
- Operator: DB Netz; DB Station&Service
- Lines: Black Forest Railway (KBS 790.6)
- Platforms: 2 side platforms
- Tracks: 2
- Train operators: S-Bahn Stuttgart
- Connections: S 6S 60; 655

Construction
- Parking: yes
- Cycle facilities: yes
- Accessible: yes

Other information
- Station code: 5443
- DS100 code: TRUT
- IBNR: 8005236
- Category: 5
- Fare zone: : 3 and 4
- Website: www.bahnhof.de

Services
| Preceding station | Stuttgart S-Bahn | Following station |
|---|---|---|
| Leonberg towards Schwabstraße | S6 | Renningen towards Weil der Stadt |
| Leonberg towards Schwabstraße | S60 | Renningen towards Böblingen |
Location
- Location within Baden-Württemberg Location within Germany Location within Europe

Rutesheim station (German: Haltepunkt Rutesheim) is a railway station in the municipality of Rutesheim, located in the Böblingen district in Baden-Württemberg, Germany.
