= Gäufelden =

- Municipality
- Coat of arms

- Location of Gäufelden within Böblingen district
- Interactive map of Gäufelden
- Location within Germany Location within Baden-Württemberg
- Coordinates: 48°33′38″N 8°50′06″E
- Country: Germany
- State: Baden-Württemberg
- Admin. region: Stuttgart
- District: Böblingen
- Subdivisions: 3

Government
  - Mayor (2019–27): Benjamin Schmid

Area
  - Total: 20.07 km^{2} (7.75 sq mi)
- Elevation: 481 m (1,578 ft)

Population (2025-12-31)
  - Total: 9,199
  - Density: 458.3/km^{2} (1,187/sq mi)
- Time zone: UTC+01:00 (CET)
  - Summer (DST): UTC+02:00 (CEST)
- Postal codes: 71126
- Dialling codes: 07032
- Vehicle registration: BB
- Website: www.gaeufelden.de

Gäufelden (German pronunciation: [ɡɔɪ̯ˈfɛldn̩]) is a municipality in the administrative district of Böblingen, in the German state of Baden-Württemberg.

== Geography ==
Gäufelden is located in the upper Gäu about seven kilometres from Herrenberg and just as far from Nagold. The local subdistrict extends from 390 to 545 metres above sea level.

The municipality of Gäufelden is situated in the southwestern corner of the Böblingen district, sharing its eastern border with the district of Tübingen.

The highest elevation is located in the north-west, standing at 544.95 m, while the lowest point can be found to the north-east at 381.50 m.

== Economy and Infrastructure ==
=== Traffic ===
==== Rail ====
Gäufelden is connected to the national railway network via the Stuttgart–Horb railway. The railway station is served every two hours by regional express trains to Singen (in the opposite direction to Stuttgart Hauptbahnhof), by regional trains to Freudenstadt Hauptbahnhof or Rottweil, which also share every two hours in Eutingen im Gäu, and by individual regional trains to Herrenberg (in the opposite direction to Bondorf (b Herrenberg)). In the evenings from Monday to Friday, a pair of trains on the S 81 line of the Karlsruhe Stadtbahn, which otherwise ends in Eutingen im Gäu, will also be tied through to Herrenberg, which also stops in Gäufelden.

==== Bus transport ====
In order to provide a connection to the S 1 line of the Stuttgart S-Bahn to Kirchheim unter Teck, which terminates in Herrenberg, Gäufelden is served hourly by buses in the direction of Herrenberg.

==== Roads ====
Gäufelden is located on several Landesstraßen and Kreisstraßen.

== History ==
The municipality was founded July 1, 1971 by the voluntary merger of the previously independent villages of Nebringen, Öschelbronn and Tailfingen. Since then, the population has more than doubled. These three villages constitute "Ortsteile" (districts) of Gäufelden. Each district retains a Rathaus (town hall), but the administration is centralized in Öschelbronn.

=== Nebringen ===
The town was first mentioned in the 12th century. In 1382, it passed from the Counts Palatine of Tübingen to the County of Württemberg. Ecclesiastically, Nebringen originally belonged to the parish of Gültstein. It became an independent parish toward the end of the Middle Ages. With the Reformation, Nebringen became a branch parish of Tailfingen. A large number of Celtic graves containing rich grave goods have been excavated in Nebringen. The recovered grave items can be viewed at the Württemberg State Museum.

=== Öschelbronn ===
The town of Öschelbronn was established in 1824 by uniting Ober- and Unteröschelbronn. Between then and 1612, Oberöschelbronn was gradually acquired by Württemberg from the lords of Genkingen, Gültlingen, and others. The Bebenhausen Monastery purchased one-half of Unteröschelbronn from Friedrich von Enzberg and Peter Remp, a citizen of Reutlingen, between 1408 and 1413. After the Reformation, this region became part of Württemberg.

== Former mayors ==
- Herrmann Wolf (1971-2003)
- Johannes Buchter (2003-2019)
