= Renningen station =

Railway station in Renningen, Germany

Renningen
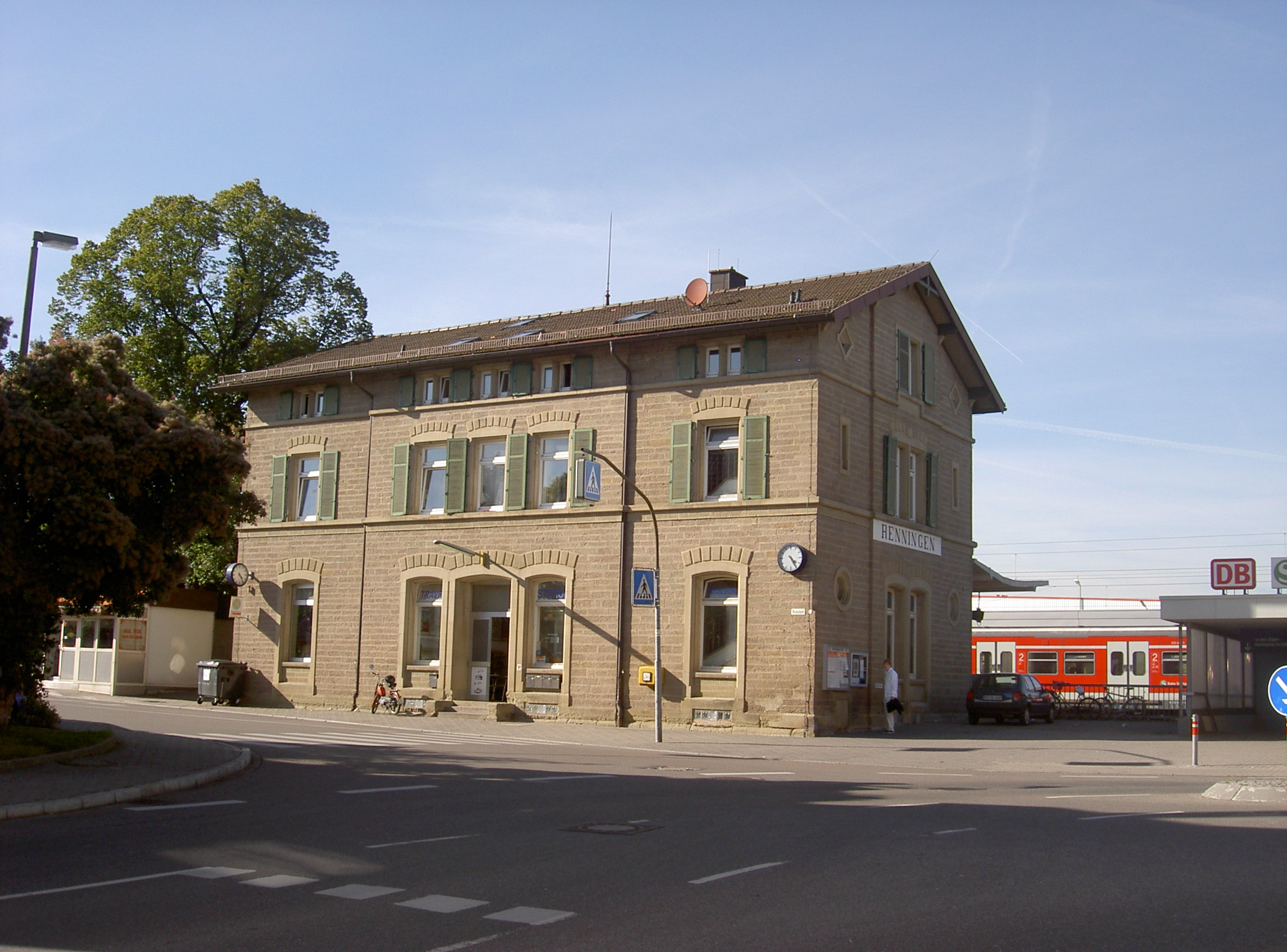

General information
- Location: Renningen, Baden-Württemberg; Germany
- Coordinates: 48°46′30″N 8°55′56″E
- Lines: Black Forest Railway (KBS 790.6); Rankbach Railway
- Platforms: 3 (2 used regularly)

Construction
- Accessible: Yes

Other information
- Station code: 5226
- DS100 code: TRX
- IBNR: 8000313
- Category: 4
- Fare zone: : 4
- Website: www.bahnhof.de

History
- Opened: 1 December 1869

Services
Preceding station	Stuttgart S-Bahn	Following station
Rutesheim towards Schwabstraße	S6	Malmsheim towards Weil der Stadt
Rutesheim towards Schwabstraße	S60	Renningen Süd towards Böblingen
Location

Renningen station serves the town of Renningen in the German state of Baden-Württemberg. It is at the junction of the Rankbach Railway (German: Rankbachbahn) and the Württemberg Black Forest Railway (Schwarzwaldbahn). It is a station on the Stuttgart S-Bahn network.

== History ==
From 1865 onwards Renningen was expecting a rail connection to be built to it, but the Royal Württemberg State Railways was only able to build the Black Forest Railway in stages. The Ditzingen–Weil der Stadt section was opened on 1 December 1869. The station was about one kilometre north of the location of the village at that time. The present Bahnhofstraße was a dirt road that ran through marshes and fields to the new railway, which was widened just before the line opened. Carters however used the road to Rutesheim and left it, where it was closest to the station. There, the municipality built a straight paved road (now called Alte Bahnhofstraße, “Old Station Street”) to connect with the station.

In 1913, the State Railways began building the Rankbach Railway as part of a freight bypass around the Stuttgart basin. It ran between Böblingen and Renningen, creating a connection between the Stuttgart–Horb railway and the Black Forest Railway. It was opened on 23 December 1914 from Böblingen to Sindelfingen and on 1 October 1915 to Renningen. In 1913, a plan was submitted for a line called the Platten Railway (Plattenbahn) from Renningen via Friolzheim to Mühlacker, but it was not supported by the State Railways and was never built.

After the First World War and the subsequent economic crisis had been overcome, there was support for the establishment of passenger service on the Rankbach line. Many people in Renningen and Malmsheim found a new job at the Daimler (Daimler-Benz from 1926) plant in Sindelfingen. The line was also used to travel to schools in Sindelfingen and Böblingen. Nevertheless, services were limited. The councils of Renningen and Malmsheim unsuccessfully asked the Railway Administration in Stuttgart for improvements to services.

A Luftwaffe airfield was opened in 1937 at Malmsheim, north of Renningen, with its own railway siding for supplies. The junction was northeast of the station.

On 9 March 1939, the Black Forest Railway duplication was completed between Leonberg and Renningen. On 18 December 1939 electric train operations commenced between Stuttgart Hauptbahnhof and Weil der Stadt.

After the Second World War, the numbers of passengers between Renningen and Böblingen declined with the increase in car ownership. On 29 September 1970 passenger operations between Renningen and Sindelfingen were abandoned.

At the beginning of the 21st century there was growing support for an S-Bahn service between Renningen and Böblingen. The planned S-Bahn line S 60 should have been available for commuters in 2006, but cost increases and the need for extensive modifications delayed the reopening of passenger services. Since June 2010 line S 60 has run between Böblingen and Maichingen and it was extended to Renningen in December 2012.

== Operations ==
Stuttgart S-Bahn lines S 6 and S 60 services operate at the station. Platform track 1, next to the station building, is not used any more for services. Instead it is used for non-stopping trains running towards Leonberg. S-Bahn services towards Leonberg stop on track 2 and services towards Weil der Stadt and Böblingen stop on track 3.

Renningen station is classified by Deutsche Bahn as a category 4 station.

=== S-Bahn ===
Line	Route
S 6	Weil der Stadt – Renningen – Leonberg – Zuffenhausen – Hauptbahnhof – Schwabstraße (additional services in the peak between Leonberg and Schwabstraße)
S 60	Böblingen – Sindelfingen – Magstadt – Renningen – Leonberg – Zuffenhausen – Hauptbahnhof – Schwabstraße
