= Goldberg (Württ) station =

Railway station in Germany

Goldberg Goldberg(Württ)
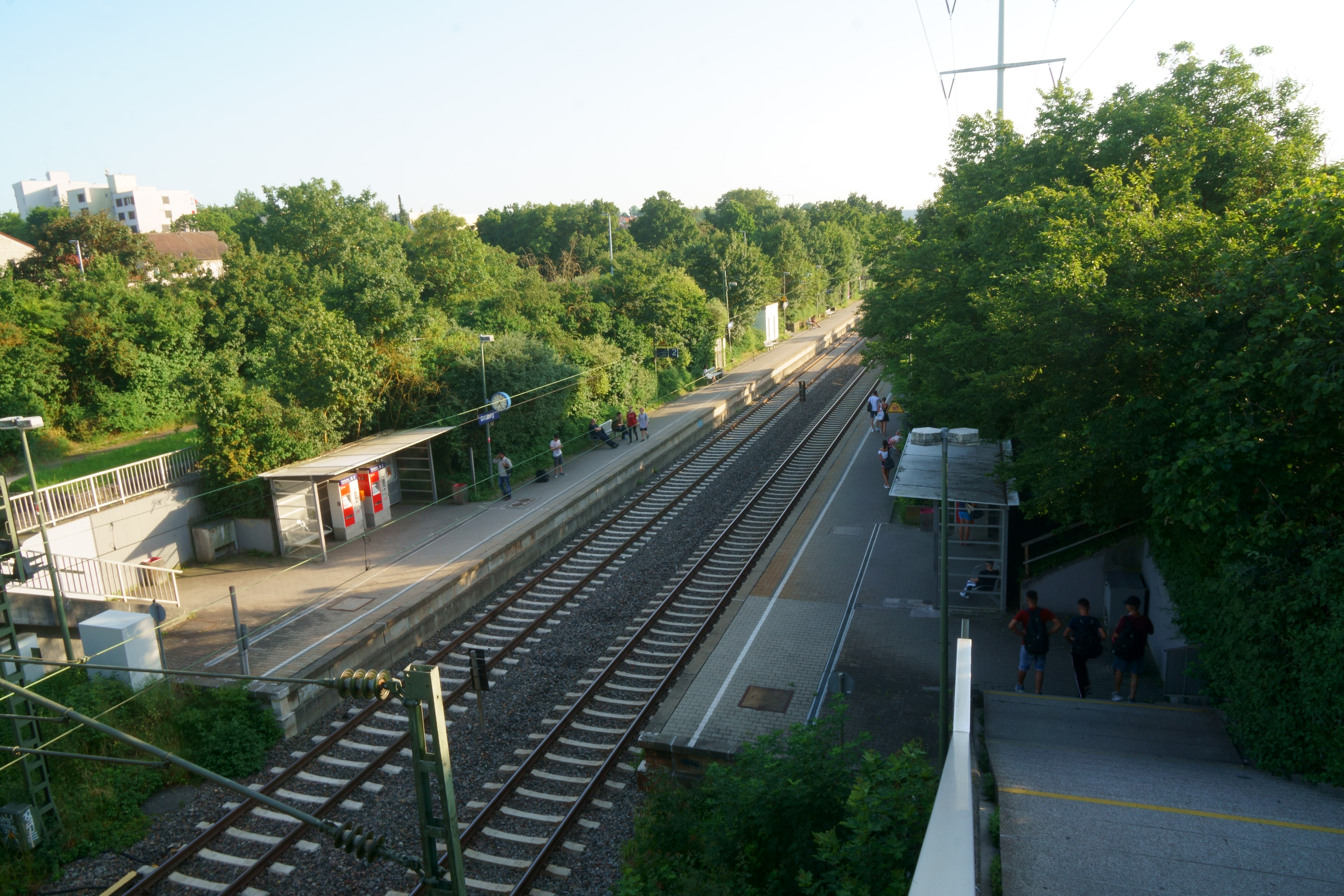
- 2019

General information
- Location: Leibnizstraße; 71032 Böblingen; Baden-Württemberg; Germany
- Coordinates: 48.6965°N 9.0197°E
- System: Hp
- Owner: Deutsche Bahn
- Operator: DB Station&Service
- Lines: Stuttgart–Horb railway (KBS 740)
- Platforms: 2 side platforms
- Tracks: 2
- Train operators: S-Bahn Stuttgart
- Connections: S 1; 704 706 708 709 722 734

Construction
- Parking: yes
- Cycle facilities: yes
- Accessible: yes

Other information
- Station code: 2171
- DS100 code: TGOL
- IBNR: 8005201
- Category: 5
- Fare zone: : 3
- Website: www.bahnhof.de

Services
Preceding station	Stuttgart S-Bahn	Following station
Böblingen towards Herrenberg	S1	Stuttgart-Rohr towards Kirchheim (Teck)
Location
- Location within Baden-Württemberg

Goldberg station is a railway station in the Goldberg district of the municipality of Böblingen, located in the Böblingen district in Baden-Württemberg, Germany.
