= Sindelfingen station =

Railway station in Sindelfingen, Germany

Sindelfingen
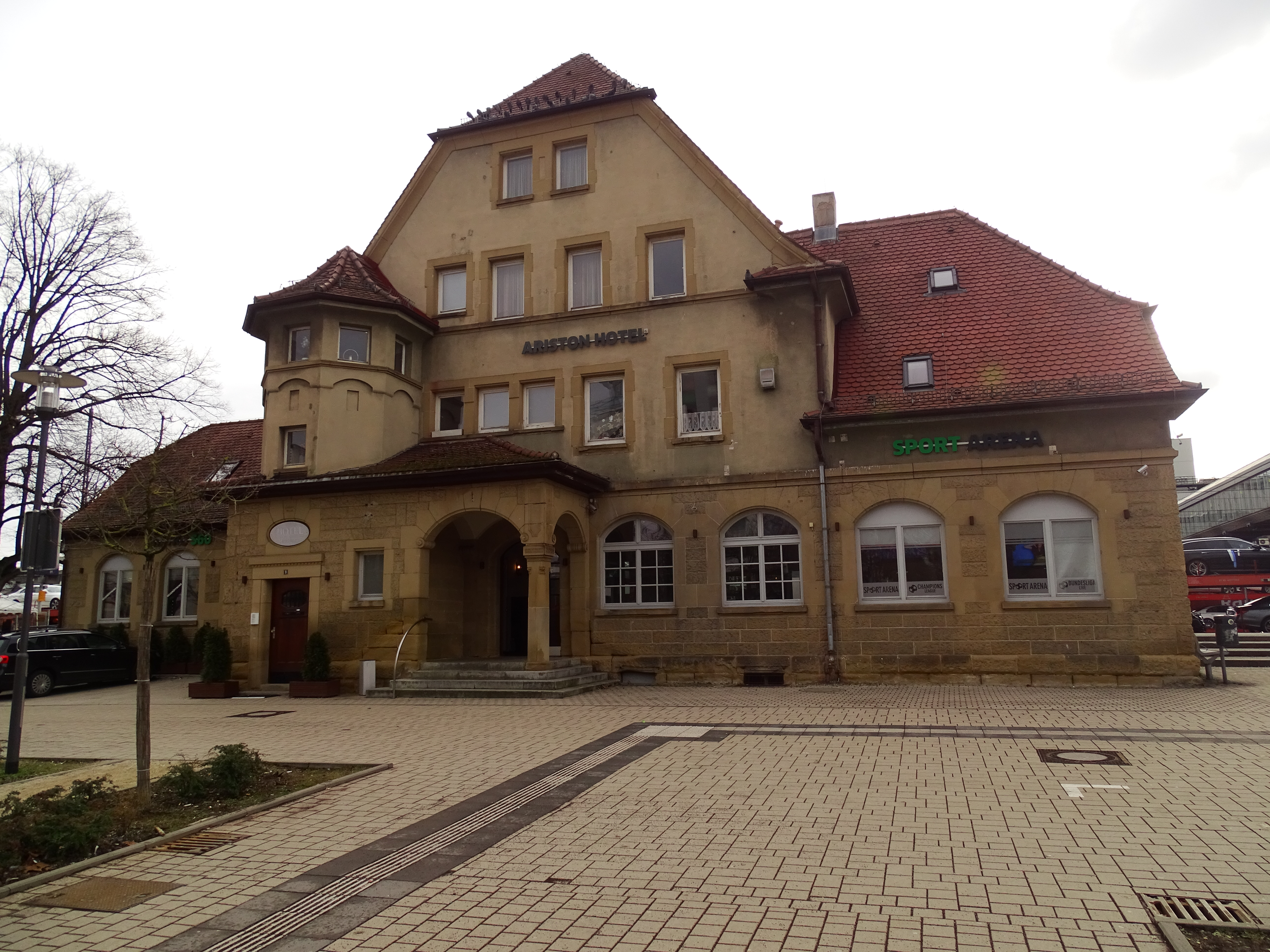
- 2019

General information
- Location: Hanns-Martin-Schleyer-Straße 9; 71063 Sindelfingen; Baden-Württemberg; Germany
- Coordinates: 48°42′14″N 8°59′57″E
- Elevation: 432 m (1,417 ft)
- System: Bf
- Owner: Deutsche Bahn
- Operator: DB Station&Service
- Lines: Rankbach Railway (KBS 790.60)
- Platforms: 1 side platform
- Tracks: 12
- Train operators: S-Bahn Stuttgart
- Connections: S 60; 705 N60

Construction
- Parking: yes
- Cycle facilities: yes
- Accessible: yes

Other information
- Station code: 5863
- DS100 code: TSI
- IBNR: 8005574
- Category: 6
- Fare zone: : 3
- Website: www.bahnhof.de

Services
Preceding station	Stuttgart S-Bahn	Following station
Maichingen towards Schwabstraße	S60	Böblingen Terminus
Location
- Location within Baden-Württemberg Location within Germany Location within Europe

Sindelfingen station (German: Bahnhof Sindelfingen) is a railway station in the municipality of Sindelfingen, located in the Böblingen district in Baden-Württemberg, Germany. It is part of the Stuttgart S-Bahn and trains go at a frequency of two trains an hour in both directions. Across the street is the Sindelfingen central bus station, and in the opposite direction it borders the Mercedes-Benz plant.

The shortest connection to the inner city of Stuttgart is via Böblingen. The other direction takes a b-line around the city over Renningen and Leonberg and eventually enters the city centre of Stuttgart from the north and will take considerably longer.

The station and most of its tracks serves as a hub for freight trains from and to the plant. Trains with raw materials and auto parts coming in and cars going out to Bremerhaven for oversea shipment.
