= Tübingen West station =

Railway station in Tübingen, Germany

Tübingen West
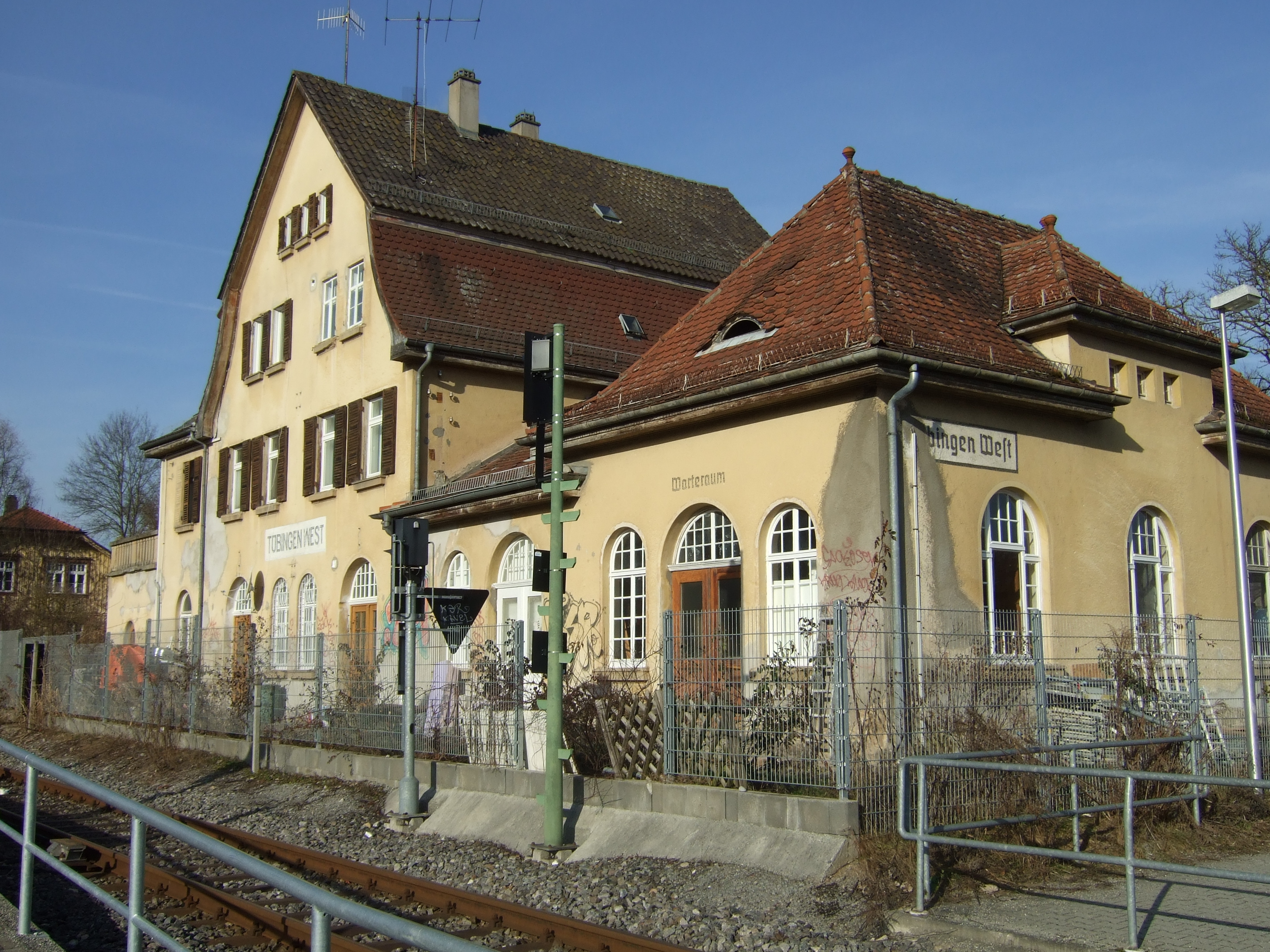
- Entrance building

General information
- Location: Tübingen, Baden-Württemberg; Germany
- Coordinates: 48°31′12″N 9°02′19″E
- System: Through station
- Line: Ammer Valley Railway
- Platforms: 2

Other information
- Station code: n/a
- DS100 code: TTW
- IBNR: 8005916
- Fare zone: naldo: 111

History
- Opened: 1910

Services
Preceding station	DB Regio Baden-Württemberg	Following station
Unterjesingen Sandäcker towards Herrenberg	RB 63	Tübingen Hbf towards Bad Urach
Location
- Location within Baden-Württemberg Location within Germany Location within Europe

Tübingen West station was opened in 1910 and is located in the west of the city of Tübingen in the German state of Baden-Württemberg. It was opened in 1910 with the Ammer Valley Railway (Ammertalbahn).

The station building is no longer used for railway operations. The station consists of two tracks around an island platform. It is necessary to cross over an unprotected passenger level crossing to reach the platform.

Currently, the former station building houses a Tanztheater ("dance theatre") with a display space and a cocktail bar and beer garden.

== History ==
Tübingen West station was opened as the last station on the Ammer Valley Railway in 1910. The station precinct consisted of a stately entrance building, a freestanding goods shed, crossing tracks with side platforms, head and side loading ramps, a weighbridge (32 tonnes), a small loading crane, a mechanical dispatcher signal box and several private sidings.

After the takeover of the operation by the Zweckverband ÖPNV im Ammertal ("communal association for public transport in the Ammer valley", ZÖA), the mechanical signal box was decommissioned in 1999, the freight facilities were abandoned and an island platform was built between the main tracks, which can be reached via a level crossing at the former station building. The remote-controlled points were replaced by resetting points, supported by train-controlled entry and distant colour light signals. The station building and goods shed still exist but are used for private purposes.

== Regional services ==
One rail service serves the station as follows:

Train class	Route	Frequency	Line	Operator
RB	Tübingen – Tübingen West – Entringen – Herrenberg	30 minutes	Ammer Valley Railway	DB Regio Baden-Württemberg
RB	Most Regionalbahn services from Herrenberg to Tübingen continue towards Plochingen or Bad Urach.			
