= Ammer Valley Railway =

Railway line in Germany

Overview
- Native name: Ammertalbahn
- Line number: 4633
- Locale: Baden-Württemberg, Germany
- Termini: Tübingen; Herrenberg

Service
- Route number: 764

Technical
- Line length: 21.4 km (13.3 mi)
- Track gauge: 1,435 mm (4 ft 8 1/2 in) standard gauge
- Minimum radius: 215 m (705 ft)
- Electrification: 15 kV 16.7 Hz AC
- Maximum incline: 1.7%

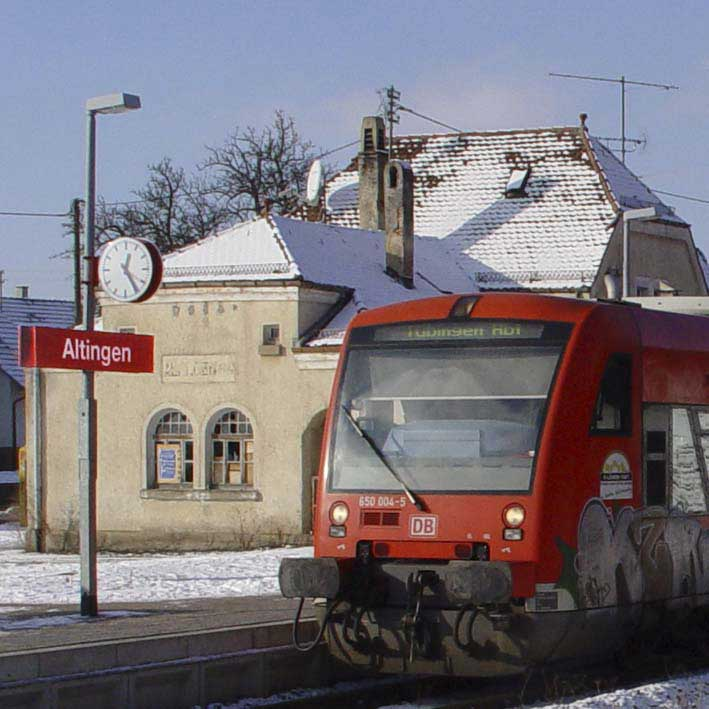
Altingen station

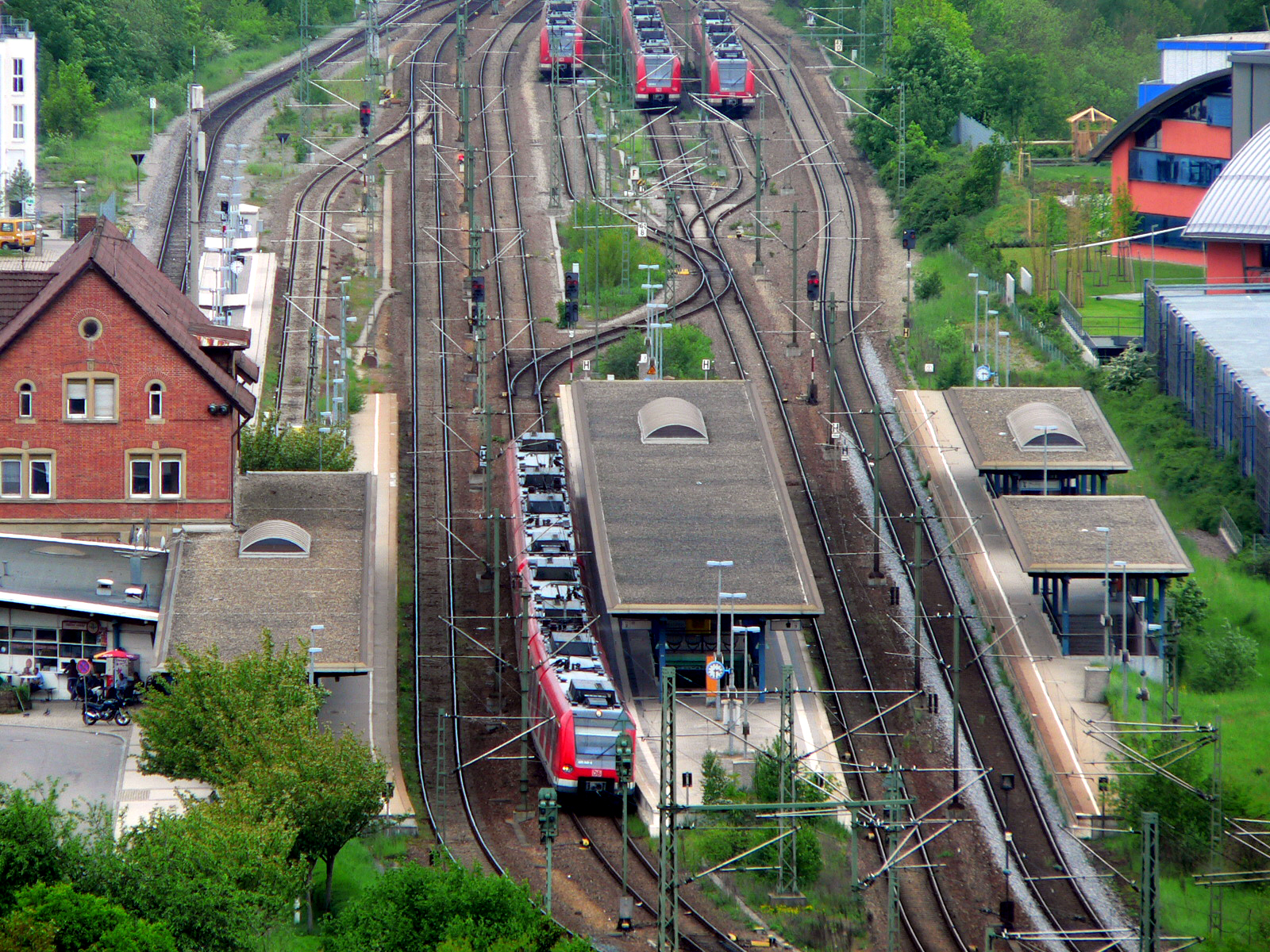
Herrenberg station: The bay platform of the Ammer Valley Railway is on the far left partially obscured by the entrance building

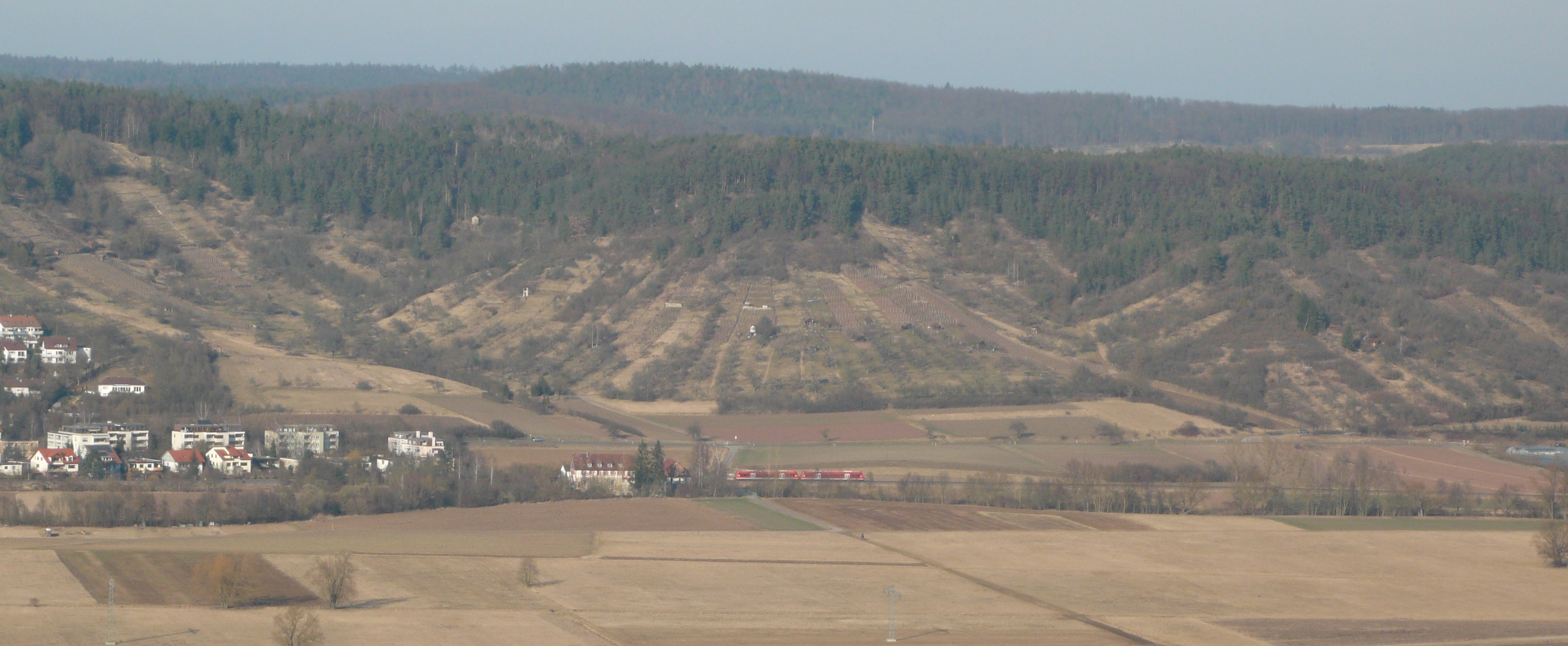
Near Unterjesingen

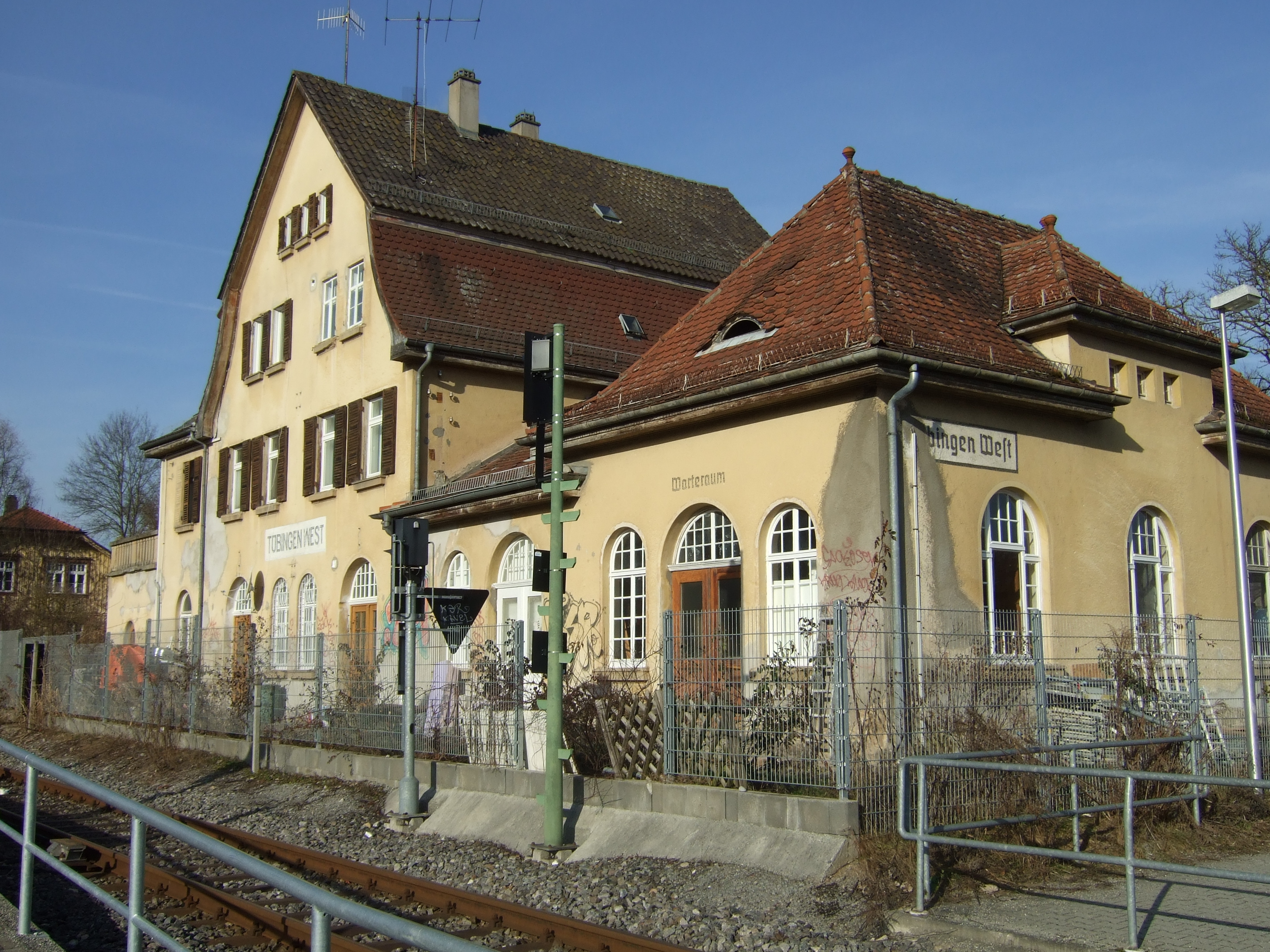
Tübingen West station

The Ammer Valley Railway (Ammertalbahn) runs through the German state of Baden-Württemberg, connecting the university town of Tübingen with Herrenberg in the Böblingen district. It mostly runs through the valley of the Ammer river.

The Royal Württemberg State Railways put the line into operation in 1909 and 1910. In 1966, Deutsche Bundesbahn stopped passenger traffic between Entringen and Herrenberg. The Gültstein–Herrenberg section was taken out of service and dismantled in the 1960s and 1970s. Since 1999, the entire length of the line has been reactivated for local passenger services. From 2019 to 2022, the line was electrified and partially double-tracked.

== History ==
The Herrenberg–Pfäffingen section was opened on 12 August 1909, while the Pfäffingen–Tübingen section was delayed to 1 May 1910, partly because the construction of the Schlossberg tunnel had not been completed. The swampy ground in the Ammer valley also had to be treated, with 13 metre long oak logs being driven into the ground to stabilise the track. Not least, a citizens' initiative had opposed the approach advocated by Tübingen mayor Hermann Haußer for the rail project. Scholars and artists saw their popular promenades along the streets endangered by the railway line. The dispute was known as the Tübinger Alleenstreit ("Tübingen allee dispute"). The Schwäbische Heimatbund ("Swabian homeland association") was founded in 1909 during this dispute. Its goal at the time was to prevent industrialisation destroying any more of the old than was really necessary.

Deutsche Bundesbahn discontinued passenger services between Entringen and Herrenberg on 25 September 1966. The Entringen–Gültstein section continued to be operated for freight traffic until 31 January 1998, while the Gültstein–Herrenberg section was abandoned and eventually dismantled in 1973. The Entringen-Gültstein section was only operated for freight traffic until 31 January 1998. However, the section was never legally closed, that is, it was not decommissioned, but was simply out of service. In 1989, Deutsche Bundesbahn applied for closure of the line.

On 26 July 1995, the Zweckverband ÖPNV im Ammertal ("municipal association for public transport in the Ammer valley", ZÖA) was established and bought the line from Deutsche Bahn in 1996. The 4.1 kilometres (2.5 mi)-long section between Gültstein and Herrenberg was rebuilt enabling the line to be reactivated for passenger services over its full length on 1 August 1999. The single-track, non-electrified line was completely modernised and prepared for operations at up to 100 kilometres per hour (62 mph). The stations of Tübingen West, Pfäffingen and Entringen are crossing stations with two platform tracks. Entringen is the station where services are scheduled to cross. In Herrenberg, the trains operate exclusively from platform 102, while in Tübingen they operate from platforms 1, 2 or 13. The line is operated using direct traffic control (Zugleitbetrieb) with the train dispatcher located in the Tübingen signalbox.

When the line was recommissioned, 700 passengers per day were expected. The number of passengers transported on the railway line on average per day rose steadily from 5,150 at the end of 1999 to 2009, by a total of 53% to 7,890 and a further 9% to 8,588 in 2019. In 2020, passenger numbers were 54% lower than the previous year at 3,978—largely due to the COVID-19 pandemic.

=== Double-track upgrade and electrification ===
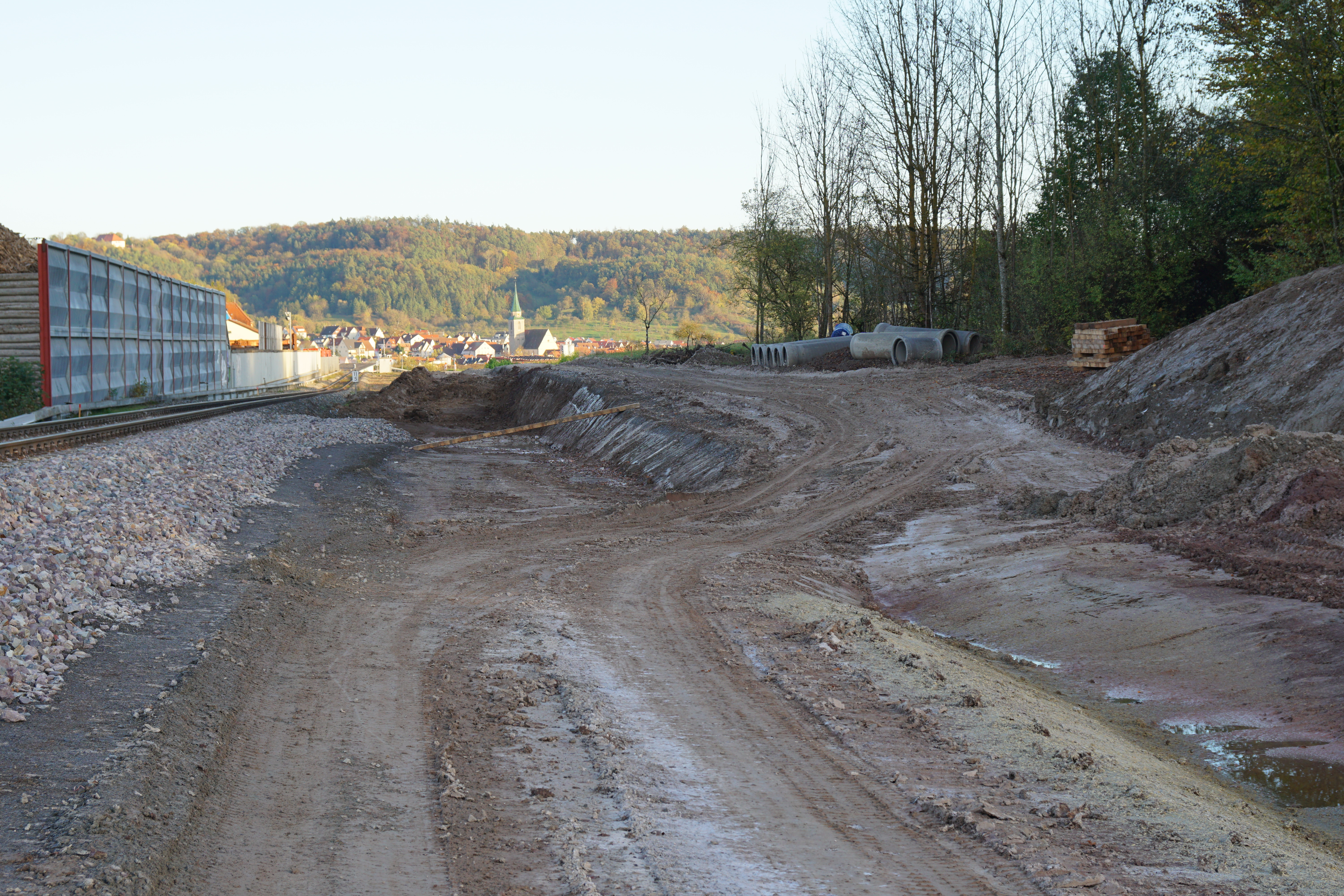
End of October 2019: construction work for the second track at Breitenholz station

The Ammer Valley Railway plays an important role in the planned Regionalstadtbahn Neckar-Alb (Neckar-Alb regional light rail) network based on the Karlsruhe model. The implementation is to take place in several stages, with the partial double-track upgrade and electrification of the line being one of the first steps.

The planning approval process for the electrification of the line with two upgraded sections began in March 2016 and the planning approval was issued on 16 May 2017. In Unterjesingen, a second track was built south of the existing line. This 1.4 kilometres (0.87 mi)-long double-track section begins behind the Ammer bridges and ends shortly before the Unterjesingen Mitte station. At the Unterjesingen Sandäcker station, a second, 110 metres (360 ft)-long outside platform was built on the new track. In Entringen, a new outside platform was built, further north than the previous main platform at the station building. The island platform was dismantled for this, so access to the platform is no longer over the tracks.

A further two-track extension was carried out over 2.6 kilometres (1.6 mi) between the western end of the platform in Entringen to the Hardtwald level crossing and the second track is also located on the south side of the existing track. The Hardtwald bridge was no longer connected to the public road network and was demolished without being replaced.

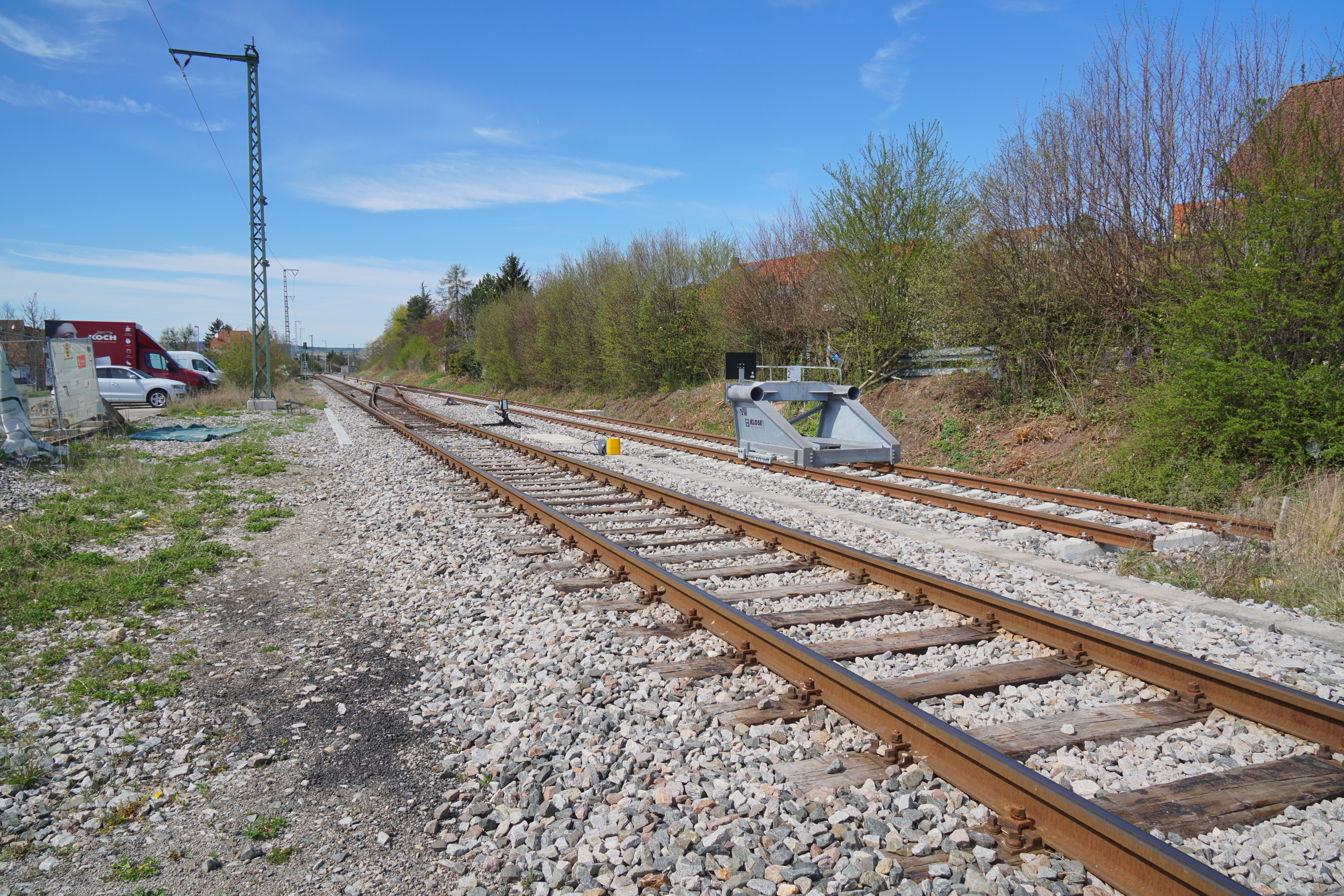
A siding with dead-end track in Altingen

According to 2012 figures (at 2006 prices), the estimated cost of the duplication of the two sections (4 km in total), the electrification of the whole line (including the Schlossberg tunnel) and the construction of a new main platform amounted to €27.8m. In the Hardtwald area, the swampy subsoil caused problems, so the foundations of the existing track had to be rebuilt. For the construction work, the former track 3 in Altingen also had to be temporarily rebuilt as a construction track. This is to be put into permanent operation as a siding without a platform, so the halt will thus be reclassified as a full station again.

Due to delays in the delivery of individual parts of the electronic interlocking system, the completion of the section between Entringen and Herrenberg was delayed from 12 September until the timetable change on 10 December 2022.

== Operations ==
From 1 August 1999, services on the Ammer Valley Railway were operated with Regio-Shuttle (class 650.0, 650.1 and 650.3) DMUs by DB ZugBus Regionalverkehr Alb-Bodensee, a subsidiary of DB Regio AG. Individual services were also operated each day by Hohenzollerische Landesbahn. Services ran every half hour from Monday to Friday and hourly on weekends. Six additional trains ran between Tübingen and Entringen for school traffic in each direction. Uerdingen railbuses (class 796 or 996) were used on the line until 21 May 1999. Since December 2019, this service has been known as RB 63.

At the timetable change in December 2022, electric operations began every 30 minutes from Herrenberg via Tübingen to Bad Urach. Monday to Friday during peak hours, trains ran between Tübingen and Entringen every 15 minutes. The state of Baden-Württemberg put these services out to tender in 2019. DB Regio was awarded the contract for these services in January 2022. The transport contract is to run until December 2035 at the latest and can be terminated from December 2030. In December 2022, the Regio-Shuttles were replaced by Alstom Coradia Continental sets, which had been used in the Augsburg electric network until December 2022. These were modernised in the course of 2023, equipped with Wi-Fi and request stop buttons and repainted in bwegt (Baden-Wurttemberg public transport) colours.

Since June 2024, trains on the RB 63 line only run to Tübingen instead of Reutlingen.

There are no freight operations on the line any more.

The owner of the line is the Zweckverband ÖPNV im Ammertal, which is owned by the Böblingen district (20%) and Tübingen district (80%).
