= Horb station =

Railway station in Baden-Württemberg, Germany

Horb
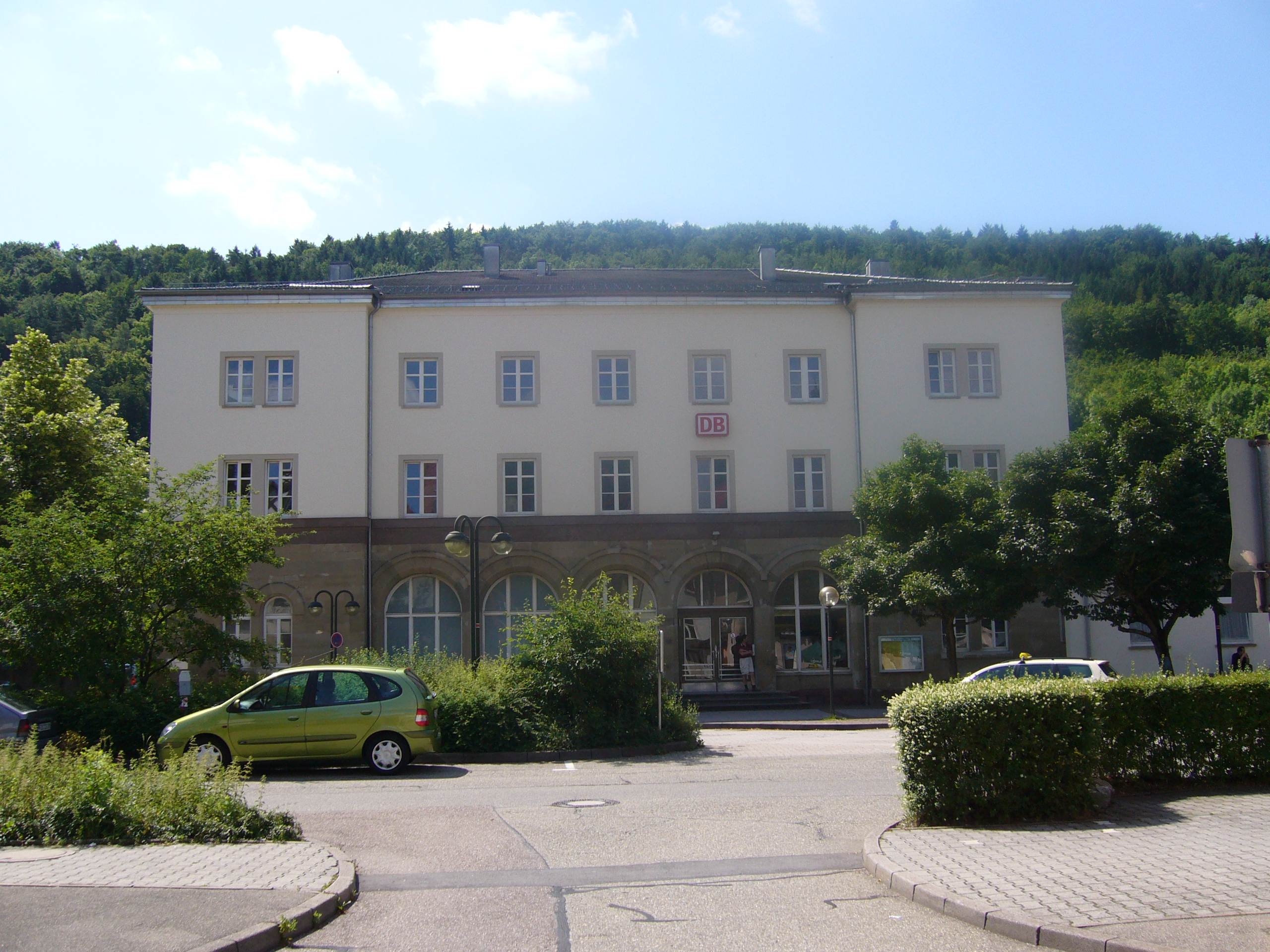
- 2007

General information
- Location: Bahnhofplatz; 72160 Horb am Neckar; Baden-Württemberg; Germany
- Coordinates: 48°26′30″N 8°41′20″E
- Elevation: 391 m (1,283 ft)
- Owner: Deutsche Bahn
- Operator: DB Station&Service
- Lines: Stuttgart–Horb railway (KBS 740); Plochingen–Immendingen railway (KBS 774)
- Platforms: 2 island platforms 1 side platform
- Tracks: 7
- Train operators: DB Fernverkehr; DB Regio Baden-Württemberg

Other information
- Station code: 2906
- DS100 code: THB
- IBNR: 8000177
- Category: 3
- Fare zone: VGF: 14; naldo: 635 (VGF transitional tariff); Move: 92 (VGF transitional tariff)
- Website: www.bahnhof.de

History
- Opened: 1 December 1866

Services
Preceding station	DB Fernverkehr	Following station
Rottweil towards Zürich HB	IC 87	Bondorf (b Herrenberg) towards Stuttgart Hbf
Rottweil towards Zürich HB	IC 87	Eutingen towards Stuttgart Hbf
Sulz (Neckar) towards Zürich HB	IC 87	Herrenberg towards Stuttgart Hbf
Sulz (Neckar) towards Zürich HB	IC 87	Böblingen towards Stuttgart Hbf
Preceding station	DB Regio Baden-Württemberg	Following station
Sulz (Neckar) towards Rottweil	RE 14a	Eutingen im Gäu towards Stuttgart Hbf
Eutingen Nord towards Pforzheim Hbf	RB 74	Mühlen (bei Horb) towards Tübingen Hbf
Preceding station	(Stuttgart)	Following station
Terminus	RE 6b	Mühlen (bei Horb) towards Stuttgart Hbf
Location
- Location within Baden-Württemberg

Horb station is a railway station in the municipality of Horb am Neckar, located in the Freudenstadt district in Baden-Württemberg, Germany.
