= Rankbach Railway =

Rail line in Baden-Württemburg, Germany

Overview
- Native name: Rankbachbahn
- Owner: DB Netz
- Line number: 4870
- Locale: Baden-Württemberg, Germany
- Termini: Renningen 48.7752°N 8.9327°E; Böblingen 48.6880°N 9.0048°E

Service
- Route number: 790.60
- Operator: S-Bahn Stuttgart

Technical
- Line length: 14.253 km (8.856 mi)
- Track gauge: 1,435 mm (4 ft 8 1/2 in) standard gauge
- Electrification: 15 kV/16.7 Hz AC overhead catenary

The Rankbach Railway (German: Rankbachbahn) is a 14.253 km long double-track railway line from Renningen to Böblingen in the southwestern region of Stuttgart in the German state of Baden-Württemberg. The line is named after the Rankbach stream. It is served by the Stuttgart S-Bahn between Böblingen and Renningen.

== History ==
The Ranbbach Railway opened on 1 October 1915. The reason it was opened was because the Germans needed a quicker means of transport to the front line during World War I and was used commercially once the war ended. On 29 September 1970 passenger operations between Renningen and Sindelfingen were abandoned. As part of the planning for the Stuttgart S-Bahn, capacity was created by shifting the operation of freight trains from sections of the Stuttgart–Würzburg and Stuttgart–Horb railway to the Rankbach line, which was upgraded in the early 1970s. The line has been electrified since 10 April 1972. In the course of the electrification the line speed was also increased from 60 km/h to 80 km/h.

The section between Maichingen and Böblingen was opened as part of the Stuttgart S-Bahn network on 10 June 2010. Regular operations started on 14 June 2010. The remaining section to Renningen was opened on 8 December 2012.

== Operations ==
=== Freight ===
Freight services use the line in particular to:

- bypass the Böblingen–Vaihingen–Stuttgart West–Prag Tunnel–Zuffenhausen–Kornwestheim Rbf (marshalling yard) route in order to ensure that the Stuttgart S-Bahn has sufficient capacity and to avoid steep gradients.
- supply parts for the Sindelfingen Daimler factory
- transport assembled car from the Sindelfingen factory to Bremen for export.

Every day about 40 freight trains run on the line, most of which start or finish at Sindelfingen.

From late March to mid-October 2008 the line between Sindelfingen and Renningen was closed for the upgrade of the line for the introduction of S-Bahn services. All freight trains were diverted to the Gäu Railway and the freight curve between Stuttgart Nord station and Kornwestheim.

=== Passengers ===
Prior to 10 December 2004 the line was only regularly served by the so-called “Daimler trains” between Sindelfingen and Horb via Böblingen, running at shift changes from the station located at DaimlerChrysler's Sindelfingen plant.

=== Construction and commissioning of the S60 ===
On 14 June 2010, the Böblingen–Maichingen section was taken into regular S-Bahn service as line S 60. For this service, the Sindelfingen–Maichingen section was duplicated and the Böblingen station was rebuilt, among other things. The platforms at all stations were also rebuilt and all level crossings were eliminated. As of June 2006 the total cost of the investment for the reconstruction and development was about €120 million.

The work on the first “Böblingen” section was completed in late March 2007. The Federal Railway Authority (Eisenbahn-Bundesamt) approved at the beginning of May 2007 the second "Sindelfingen" planning section and the Verband Region Stuttgart (which coordinates public transport in the Stuttgart Region) issued zoning approval for it. The main work on this section was carried out in 2008 and the track was completely blockaded from the end of March to October 2008.

The third section, known as "Magstadt–Renningen", which also includes duplication, obtained planning approval in late summer 2008, with construction beginning in 2009 so that the line could open at the end of 2010. Additional activities in relation to the replacement of the level crossings in Magstadt and Renningen (such as land acquisition) meant that Verband Region Stuttgart was obliged to delay the commissioning of the section to late 2011. Opening of full services has since been delayed until late 2012.

Since 14 June 2010 an S-Bahn shuttle service has operated from Monday to Friday at 30-minute intervals from 5:00 to 23:00, using class 420 electrical multiple units. Trains run from Böblingen—where it connects with line S1 services from Herrenberg to Stuttgart—via Sindelfingen to Maichingen. It is therefore also possible to transfer to the Schönbuch Railway. From mid June 2011, S 60 services ran on weekends and holidays. This was determined by the transport committee of Verband Region Stuttgart on 22 December 2010.

Since 8 December 2012 operations have been conducted as follows: the additional S 6 services that run during peak hours from Stuttgart to Weil der Stadt are divided in Renningen with part going to Böblingen and the other part to Weil der Stadt. Moreover, some of the S 6 services that stop short in Leonberg are extended to Renningen and Böblingen. Outside the rush hour trains run between Renningen and Böblingen, without running past Renningen. In contrast, Böblingen has good connections to services on line S1 and the Schönbuch Railway.
