= Böblingen station =

Railway station in Böblingen, Germany

Böblingen
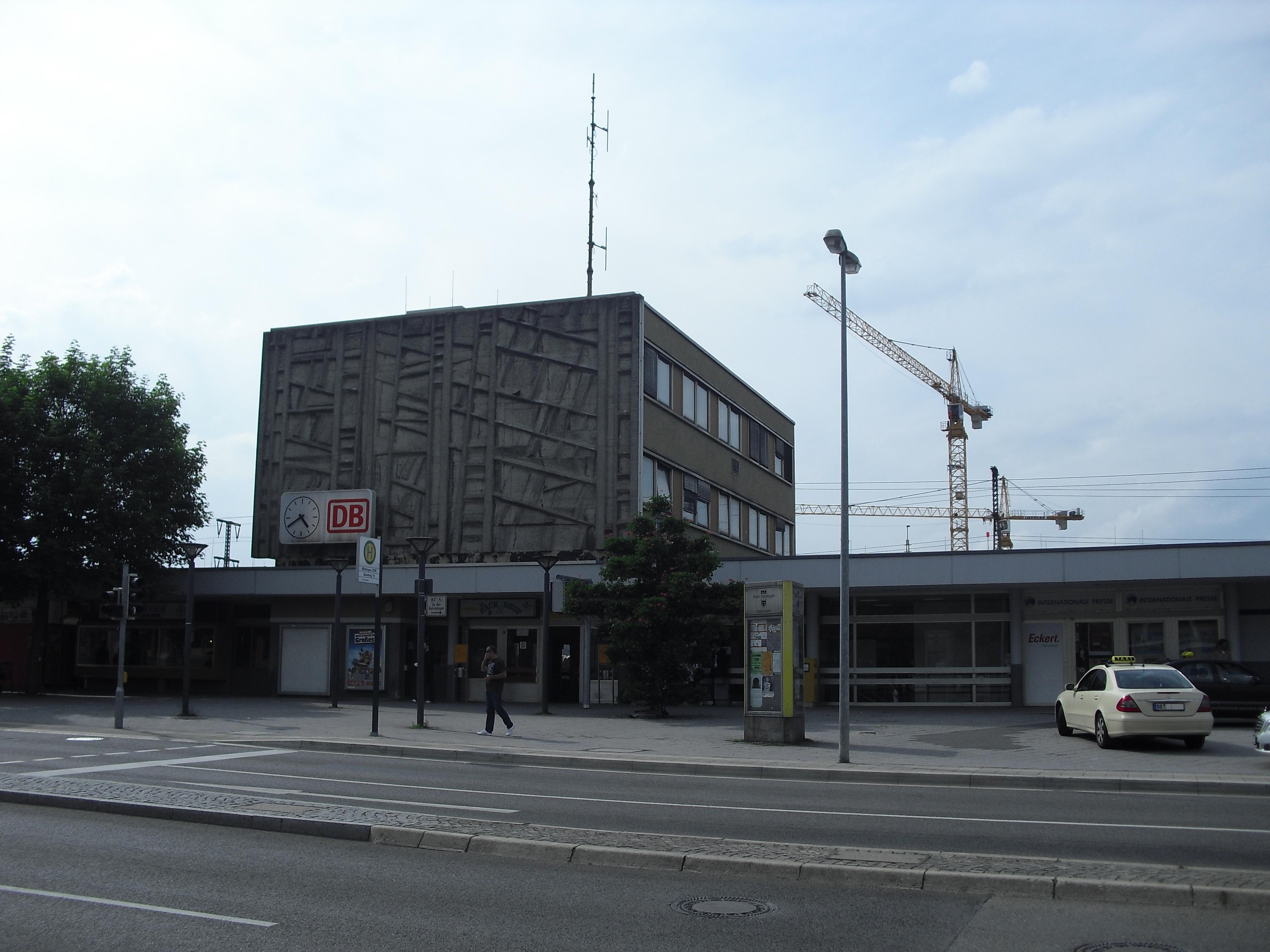

General information
- Location: Bahnhof 1/ Bahnhof 2, Böblingen, Baden-Württemberg; Germany
- Coordinates: 48°41′15″N 9°0′17″E
- Owner: Deutsche Bahn
- Operator: DB Netz; DB Station&Service
- Lines: Stuttgart–Horb railway (KBS 740, KBS 790.1); Rankbach Railway (KBS 790.60); Schönbuch Railway (KBS 790.72)
- Platforms: 5

Construction
- Accessible: Yes

Other information
- Station code: 720
- DS100 code: TBO
- Category: 3
- Fare zone: : 3
- Website: www.bahnhof.de

History
- Opened: 2 September 1879
Services
Preceding station	DB Fernverkehr	Following station
Horb towards Zürich HB	IC 87	Stuttgart-Vaihingen towards Stuttgart Hbf
Herrenberg towards Zürich HB	IC 87	Stuttgart Hbf Terminus
Preceding station	DB Regio Baden-Württemberg	Following station
Herrenberg towards Singen (Hohentwiel)	RE 4	Stuttgart Hbf Terminus
Herrenberg towards Rottweil	RE 14a	Stuttgart Hbf Terminus
Herrenberg towards Freudenstadt Hbf	RE 14b	Stuttgart Hbf Terminus
Preceding station	Württembergische Eisenbahn-Gesellschaft	Following station
Terminus	RB 46	Böblingen Danziger Straße towards Dettenhausen
Preceding station	Stuttgart S-Bahn	Following station
Hulb towards Herrenberg	S1	Goldberg towards Kirchheim (Teck)
Sindelfingen towards Schwabstraße	S60	Terminus
Location

Böblingen station is located on the Stuttgart–Horb railway (German: Gäubahn) and is at the start of the Rankbach Railway (Rankbachbahn) and the Schönbuch Railway (Schönbuchbahn). It is served by regional services and Stuttgart S-Bahn line S 1. Until 2002 it was served by Intercity-Express and Cisalpino services.

== History ==
The Oberamts (the former districts of Baden-Württemberg, that were replaced in 1934 by Landkreise) of Calw and Nagold proposed a railway line from Stuttgart at the Northern Black Forest Festival in 1863. According to the plans of Professor Johannes Mährlen, an adviser to King William I, and Otto Elben, a Member of the Oberamt Böblingen, a railway junction would be built at Böblingen, with lines running to Calw, Horb and Tübingen. Tübingen hoped for a faster connection to Stuttgart, without having to go through Plochingen. But overcoming the altitude difference between Stuttgart Hauptbahnhof and the high level of the Filder plain presented a major problem.

The counter proposal was for a route through the Strohgäu. After several debates in the Landtag (parliament) in 1865 a small majority of members voted for the route via Leonberg to Calw. The Royal Württemberg State Railways proposed that the Gäu Railway be built first and Elben eventually persuaded the royal court to support this. In November 1873, construction commenced and the line from Stuttgart via Herrenberg to Freudenstadt opened on 2 September 1879.

A station serving both Böblingen and Sindelfingen was to be built between Galgenberg and Goldberg. The State Railways decided to move site of the station to the fields west of Böblingen partly to serve a sugar factory on the Unteren See (a lake). The station building, consisting of a central building and two wings, has three floors. A shed was built for handling goods south-west of the station. In 1885 the station was renamed Böblingen (Sindelfingen) or Böblingen/Sindelfingen.

In 1905 a second track was completed on the line between Stuttgart West station and Böblingen. The Schönbuch Railway (Schönbuchbahn) was planned to run from Böblingen to Tübingen via Dettenhausen. The branch line connected the villages of the Schönbuchlichtung to Böblingen. On 16 October 1910, the State Railways opened the line to Weil im Schönbuch. The first trains reached Dettenhausen on 29 July 1911.

After a planned freight bypass track did not eventuate between Stuttgart West station and Zuffenhausen, the State Railway needed an alternative. It planned a line from Böblingen to Renningen to connect with the Black Forest Railway. The Rankbach Railway allowed freight trains to be diverted from the Stuttgart basin. Construction began in 1913. Although the outbreak of World War I delayed construction, the first section was opened on 23 December 1914 to Sindelfingen. As a result of the opening of Sindelfingen station, Böblingen (Sindelfingen) station was renamed Böblingen station. In October 1915, the whole line was completed.

On 1 May 1922 a branch of the Schönbuch Railway was opened to Schönaich from a junction at Schönaicher First (now Böblingen Zimmerschlag) station. As a continuation to Waldenbuch or even Nürtingen was never implemented, Schönaich was the end of the line.

The growing car ownership during the post-war economic boom led to the end of passenger traffic on the branch lines around Böblingen. Deutsche Bundesbahn closed the Schönaicher First–Schönaich section in 1954. In 1965, the last passenger service ran to Dettenhausen. Passenger services on the Rankbach Railway were closed west of Sindelfingen in 1970; in 2004 passengers services were closed to Sindelfingen. A new entrance building was opened in Böblingen in 1969. This is a multi-storey building, with a facade on its street side that is covered by a relief, which is reminiscent of railway tracks.

In 1996, the Württembergische Eisenbahn-Gesellschaft reopened the Schönbuch Railway. In 2010, the Rankbach Railway was reopened and it is served by the Stuttgart S-Bahn.

== Operations ==
Böblingen station is a railway junction on the Gäu Railway, from which the Rankbach Railway and Schönbuch Railway branch. Trains on the Schönbuch Railway start and finish on platform track 1. Track 2 is the used by regional trains to Stuttgart. Track 3 is used by S-Bahn trains to Rohr. Track 4 is used by S-Bahn trains to Herrenberg station. S-Bahn services on line S 60 start and end on track 5 and it also used by regional trains to Herrenberg. The station is classified by Deutsche Bahn as a category 3 station.

=== Regional Transport ===
Route		Frequency
IC 87 / RE 87	Stuttgart – Böblingen – Herrenberg – Eutingen im Gäu – Horb – Rottweil – Tuttlingen – Singen	60 minutes
RE 4	Stuttgart – Böblingen (– Herrenberg ) – Horb (– Rottweil ) – Tuttlingen – Radolfzell – Konstanz	2 train pairs
RE 14a	Stuttgart – Böblingen – Herrenberg – Eutingen im Gäu – Horb – Rottweil	120 minutes (Regional-Express between Stuttgart and Eutingen coupled with Stuttgart-Freudenstadt service)
RE 14b	Stuttgart – Böblingen – Herrenberg – Eutingen im Gäu – Freudenstadt	120 minutes (Regional-Express between Stuttgart and Eutingen coupled with Stuttgart–Rottweil service)
RB 46	Böblingen – Holzgerlingen – Dettenhausen	30 minutes

=== S-Bahn ===
Line	Route
S 1	Kirchheim (Teck) – Wendlingen – Plochingen – Esslingen – Neckarpark – Bad Cannstatt – Hauptbahnhof – Schwabstraße – Vaihingen – Rohr – Böblingen – Herrenberg (extra trains in the peak between Esslingen and Böblingen.)
S 60	Böblingen – Sindelfingen – Magstadt – Renningen – Leonberg – Zuffenhausen – Hauptbahnhof – Schwabstraße
