= Gäufelden station =

Railway station in Gäufelden, Germany

Gäufelden
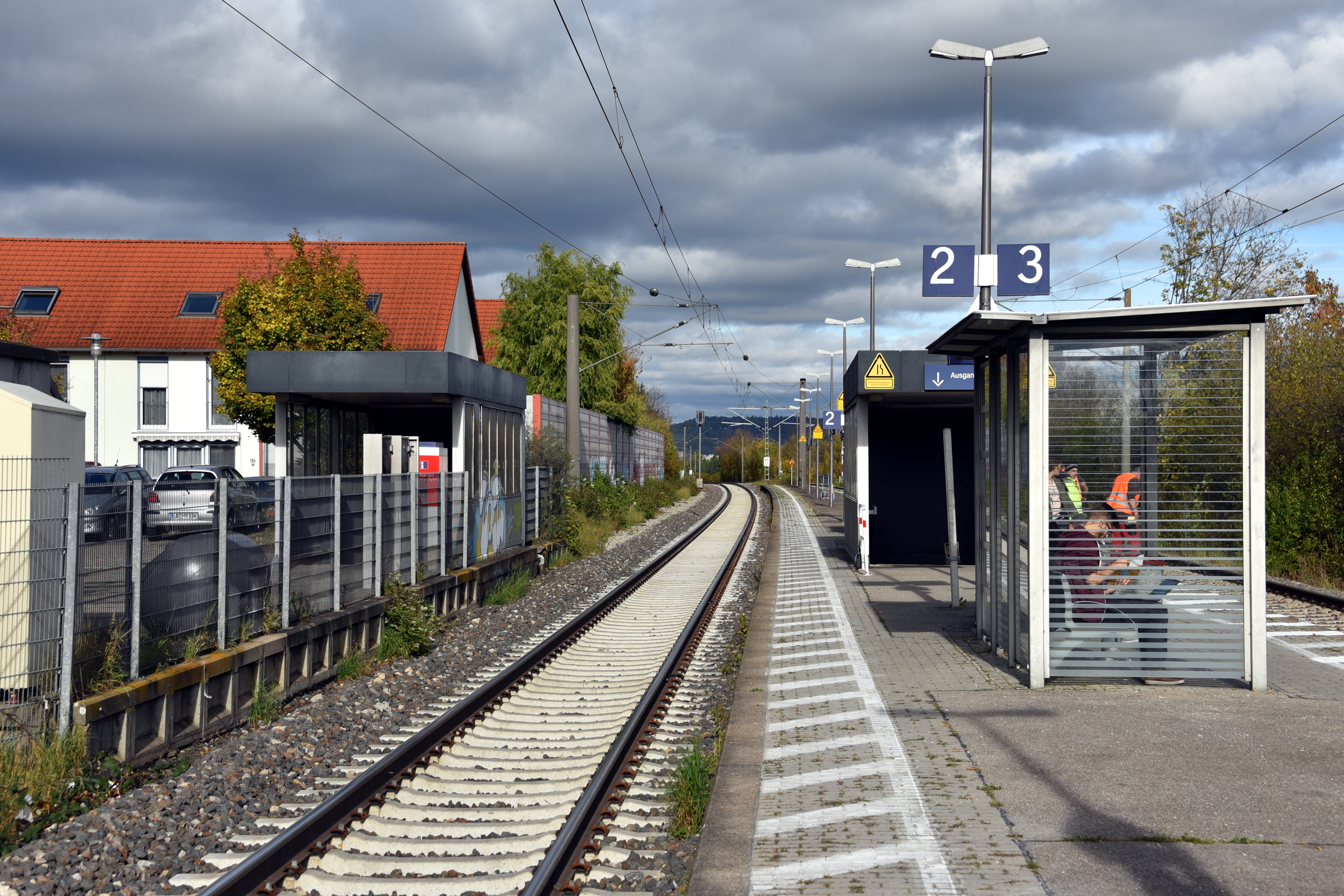
- 2017

General information
- Location: Bahnhofstraße 12; 71126 Gäufelden; Baden-Württemberg; Germany
- Coordinates: 48°33′35″N 8°51′01″E
- Owner: Deutsche Bahn
- Operator: DB Station&Service
- Lines: Stuttgart–Horb railway (KBS 740)
- Platforms: 1 island platform
- Tracks: 2
- Train operators: DB Fernverkehr; DB Regio Baden-Württemberg
- Connections: 777

Construction
- Parking: yes
- Cycle facilities: yes
- Accessible: no

Other information
- Station code: 2023
- DS100 code: TGFD
- IBNR: 8002166
- Category: 5
- Fare zone: : 5; naldo: 501 (VVS transitional tariff)
- Website: www.bahnhof.de

Services
Preceding station	DB Fernverkehr	Following station
Bondorf (b Herrenberg) towards Zürich HB	IC 87	Herrenberg towards Stuttgart Hbf
Preceding station	DB Regio Baden-Württemberg	Following station
Bondorf (b Herrenberg) towards Rottweil	RE 14a	Herrenberg towards Stuttgart Hbf
Bondorf (b Herrenberg) towards Freudenstadt Hbf	RE 14b	Herrenberg towards Stuttgart Hbf
Location
- Location within Baden-Württemberg Location within Germany Location within Europe

Gäufelden station (German: Haltepunkt Gäufelden) is a railway station in the municipality of Gäufelden, located in the Böblingen district in Baden-Württemberg, Germany.
