= Bondorf (b Herrenberg) station =

Railway station in Bondorf, Germany

Bondorf (b Herrenberg)
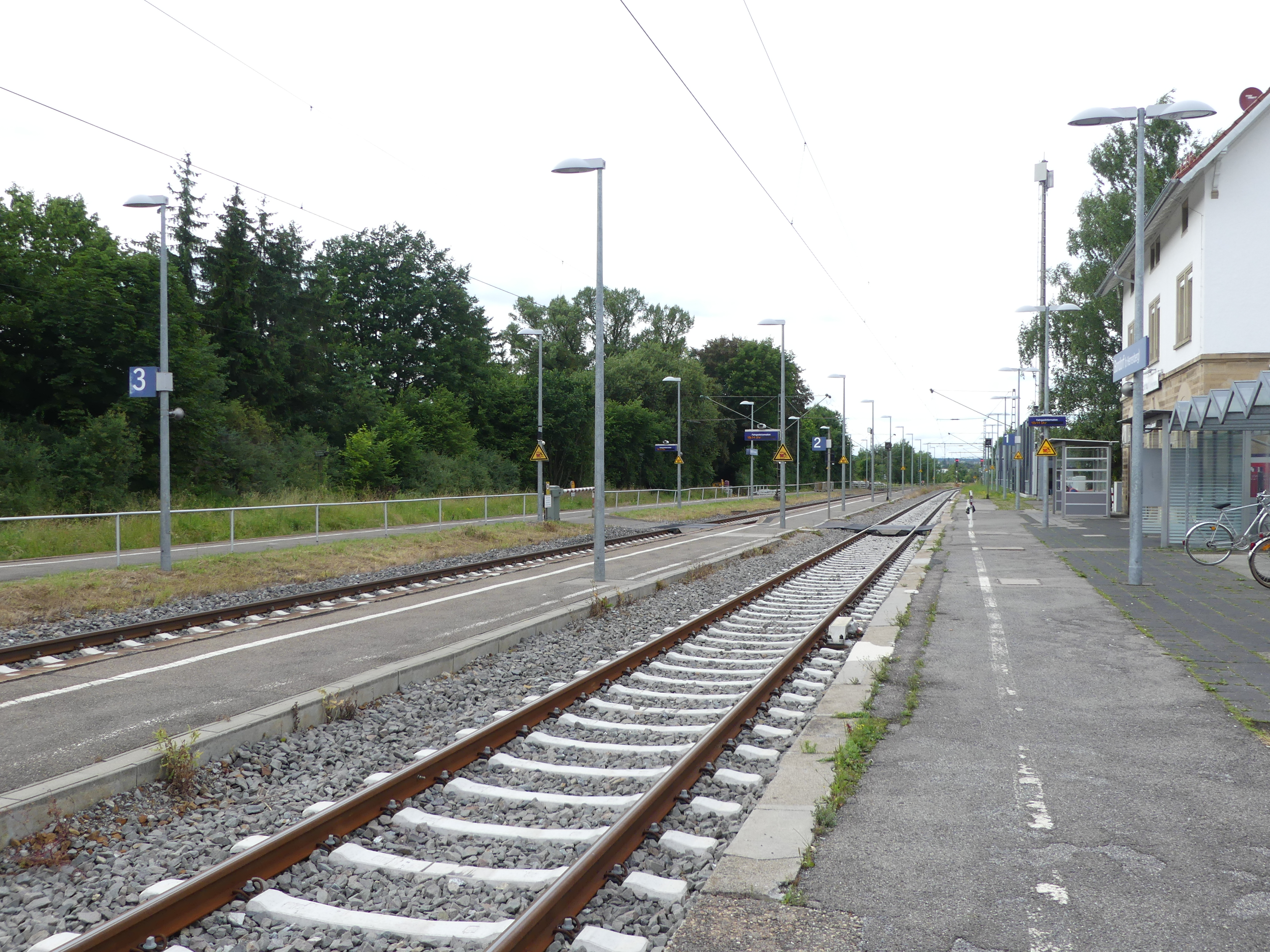
- 2016

General information
- Location: Bahnhofstraße; 71149 Bondorf; Baden-Württemberg; Germany
- Coordinates: 48.5235°N 8.8281°E
- Owner: Deutsche Bahn
- Operator: DB Station&Service
- Lines: Stuttgart–Horb railway (KBS 740)
- Platforms: 1 island platform 1 side platform
- Tracks: 3
- Train operators: DB Fernverkehr; DB Regio Baden-Württemberg; Karlsruhe Stadtbahn
- Connections: S 8; 553 778 7627

Construction
- Parking: yes
- Cycle facilities: yes
- Accessible: yes

Other information
- Station code: 762
- DS100 code: TBD
- IBNR: 8001080
- Category: 5
- Fare zone: naldo: 595; : 5
- Website: www.bahnhof.de

Services
| Preceding station | DB Fernverkehr | Following station |
|---|---|---|
| Horb towards Zürich HB | IC 87 | Gäufelden towards Stuttgart Hbf |
| Ergenzingen towards Zürich HB | IC 87 | Gäufelden towards Stuttgart Hbf |
| Preceding station | DB Regio Baden-Württemberg | Following station |
| Horb towards Singen (Hohentwiel) | RE 4 | Herrenberg towards Stuttgart Hbf |
| Ergenzingen towards Rottweil | RE 14a | Gäufelden towards Stuttgart Hbf |
| Ergenzingen towards Freudenstadt Hbf | RE 14b | Gäufelden towards Stuttgart Hbf |
Location
- Location within Baden-Württemberg Location within Germany Location within Europe

Bondorf (b Herrenberg) station (German: Bahnhof Bondorf (b Herrenberg)) is a railway station in the municipality of Bondorf, located in the Böblingen district in Baden-Württemberg, Germany.
