= Rankbach =

River in Germany

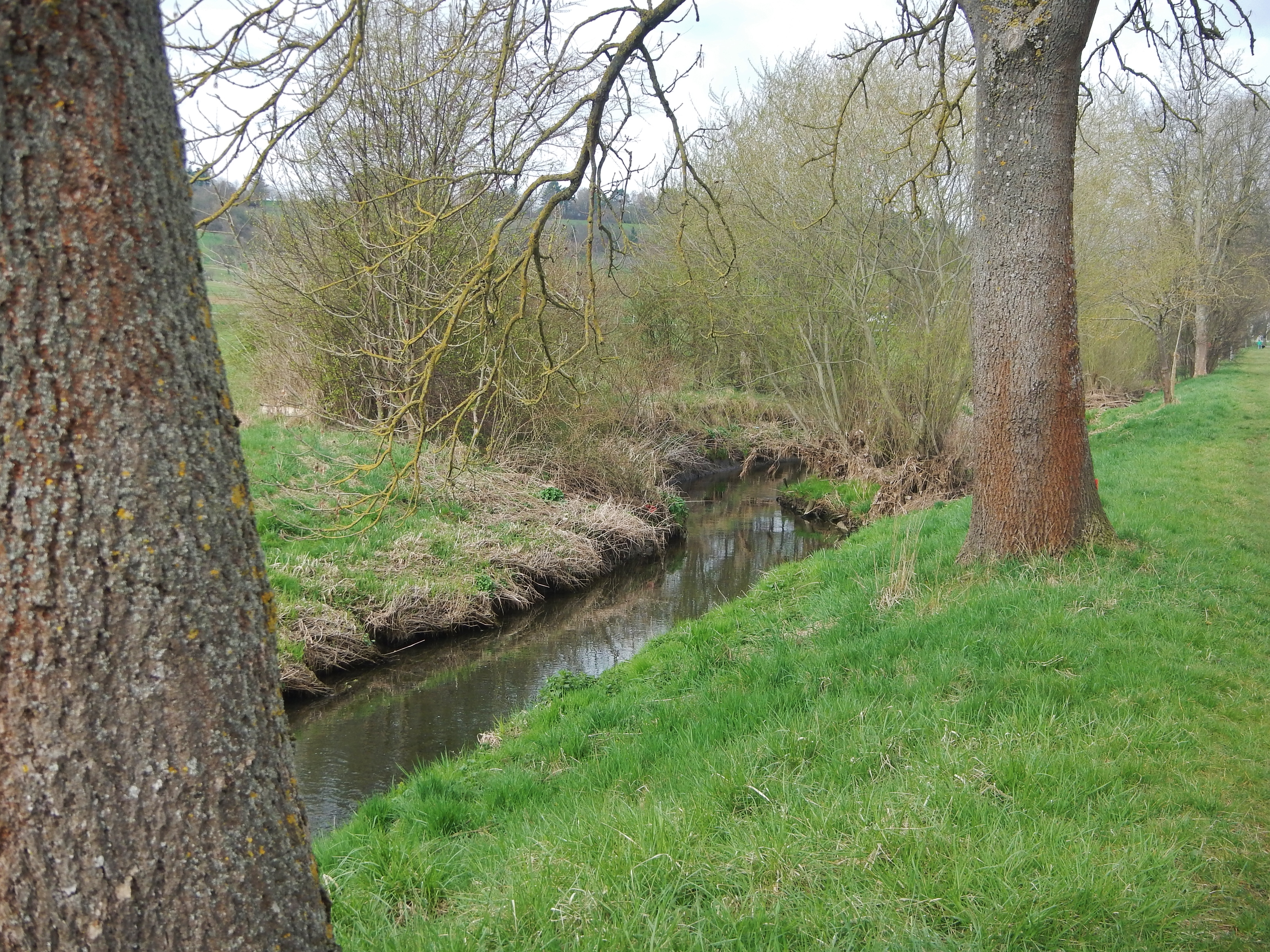

Location
- Country: Germany
- State: Baden-Württemberg

Physical characteristics
- Mouth
  - location: Würm
  - coordinates: 48.7627°N 8.8774°E
- Length: 16.7 km (10.4 mi)

Basin features
- Progression: Würm→ Nagold→ Enz→ Neckar→ Rhine→ North Sea

Rankbach is a river of Baden-Württemberg, Germany. It flows into the Würm in Weil der Stadt.

== See also ==
- List of rivers of Baden-Württemberg
