= Leonberg station =

Railway station in Leonberg, Germany

Leonberg
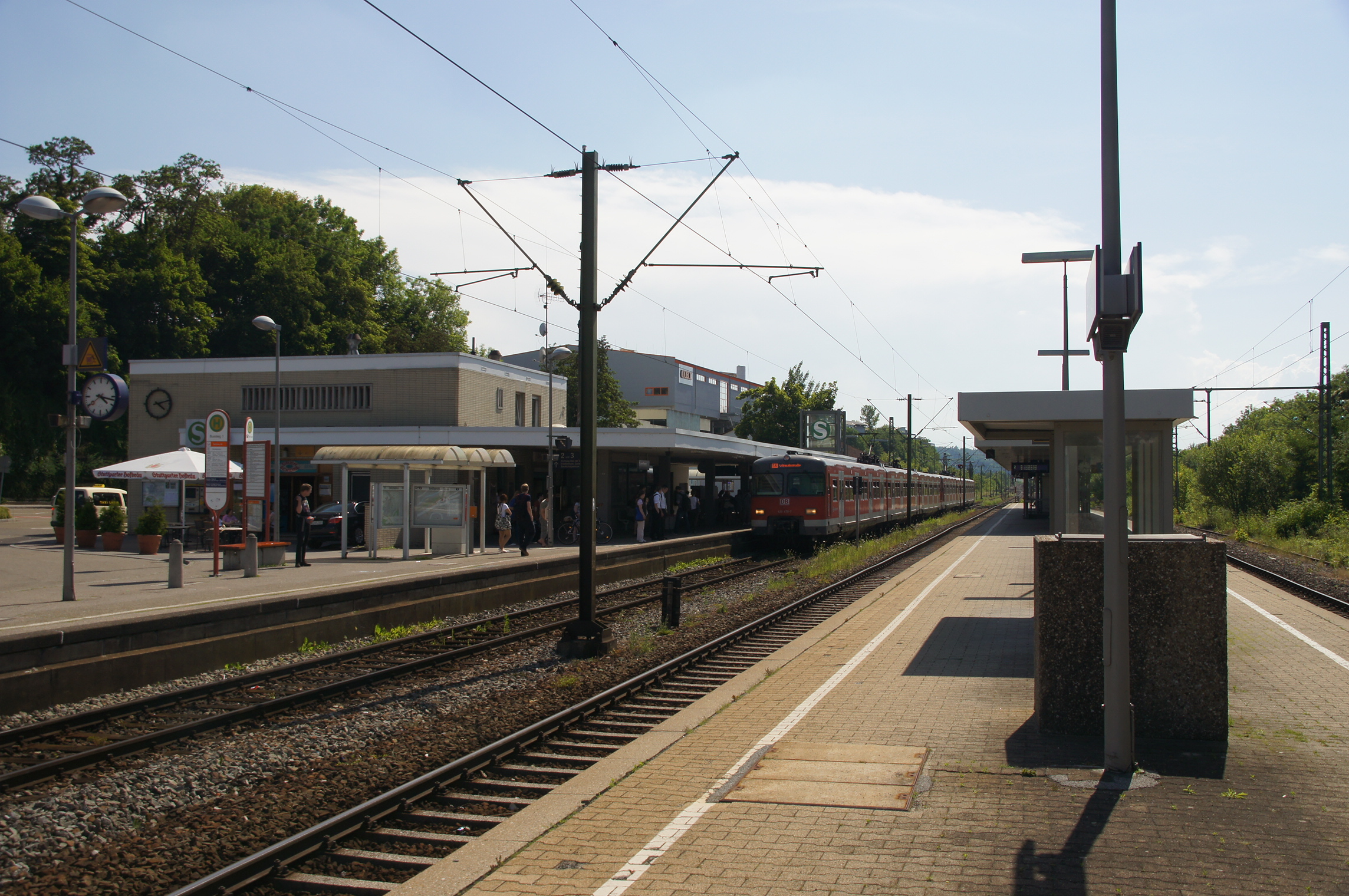

General information
- Location: Bahnhofstr. 78, Leonberg, Baden-Württemberg; Germany
- Coordinates: 48°47′58″N 9°0′10″E
- Lines: Black Forest Railway (Württemberg) (KBS 790.6
- Platforms: 3 (2 regularly used)

Construction
- Accessible: Yes

Other information
- Station code: 3667
- DS100 code: TLE
- IBNR: 8003652
- Category: 5
- Fare zone: : 3
- Website: www.bahnhof.de

History
- Opened: 1 December 1869; 156 years ago
- Electrified: 15 May 1939; 87 years ago

Services
Preceding station	Stuttgart S-Bahn	Following station
Höfingen towards Schwabstraße	S6	Rutesheim towards Weil der Stadt
Höfingen towards Schwabstraße	S60	Rutesheim towards Böblingen
Location

Leonberg station is a station located on the Black Forest Railway in the town of Leonberg in the German state of Baden-Württemberg. It is served by lines S 6 and S 60 of the S-Bahn. It is classified by Deutsche Bahn as a category 4 station.

== History ==
A horse-drawn omnibus service had operated between Leonberg and Stuttgart from 1840. However, it could only carry twelve people and operated only two or three times a week.

In 1863, representatives of the Oberamts (the districts of the time) of Calw and Nagold requested that their districts be connected to the railway network. Christian Maier, chief official of the Oberamt of Leonberg, agreed and suggested a route through Leonberg and Weil der Stadt. But the Oberamt of Böblingen wanted the benefits of a new railway and the member for Böblingen, Otto Elben, presented the parliament of Württemberg with his plan for a line from Böblingen. The heads of the Oberamts of the Black Forest distanced themselves from this discussion. Whether the line ran via Böblingen or Leonberg seemed secondary to them. There were long debates in the parliament. The member for Leonberg was obliged to give parliament an assurance that agriculture and trade was more important in the Oberamt of Leonberg. It is debatable whether he persuaded parliament or the members just decided to pick the less expensive proposal. Parliament decided with a slim majority on 13 August 1865 to pick the option that passed through the Strohgäu, thus securing a rail link for Leonberg.

The construction of the Black Forest Railway took longer than anticipated. Large earthworks were necessary, especially in the section between Ditzingen and Leonberg. The station was built west of Leonberg on the border with the Eltingen district. The Royal Württemberg State Railways (German: Königlich Württembergischen Staats-Eisenbahnen) built a more monumental station building for the Oberamt town than was usual on the line. It consisted of a three-story main building, with a single storey extension. The building ended in a polygonal section.

=== Subsequent events ===
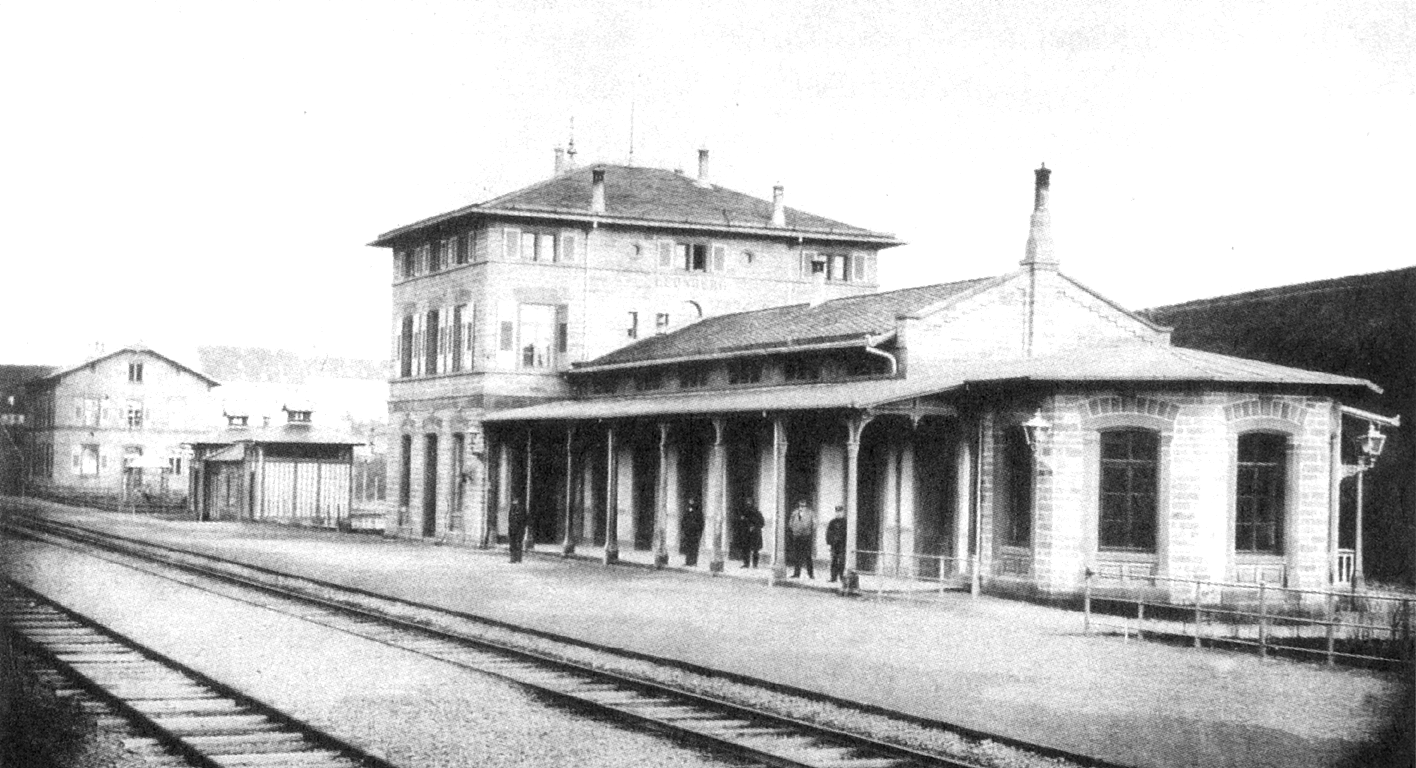
Leonberg station in 1870

On 1 December 1869, the Royal Württemberg State Railways put the Ditzingen–Weil der Stadt section into service. In subsequent years, the population of the town increased only very moderately. The small district had barely enough room for a significant industrial centre. The Black Forest line lost much of its importance after the completion of the Gäu Railway in September 1879.

The Black Forest Railway has had a second track on the Ditzingen–Leonberg section since 30 September 1932. The line was electrified between Zuffenhausen and Leonberg on 15 May 1939, leading to an improved rail services.

As a modernisation measure, Deutsche Bundesbahn demolished the historic station building in 1967 and opened a new one-story flat-roofed building on 22 January 1969. On 1 October 1978, S-Bahn line S 6, running from Stuttgart Schwabstraße to Weil der Stadt, replaced the existing electric suburban trains.

== Rail operations ==
The station is served by lines S 6 and S60 of the Stuttgart S-Bahn. S-Bahn services towards Zuffenhausen and Stuttgart stop on platform track 1, next to the station building. Trains towards Renningen stop on track 2. Platform 3 is used by some services beginning or ending in Leonberg. Track 4 (which has no platform) is no longer used. The station is classified by Deutsche Bahn as a category 4 station.

Line	Route
S 6	Weil der Stadt – Renningen – Leonberg – Zuffenhausen – Feuerbach – Hauptbahnhof – Schwabstraße (additional services in the peak between Leonberg and Schwabstraße)
S 60	Böblingen – Sindelfingen – Magstadt – Renningen – Leonberg – Zuffenhausen – Hauptbahnhof – Schwabstraße
