= Rutesheim =

- Town
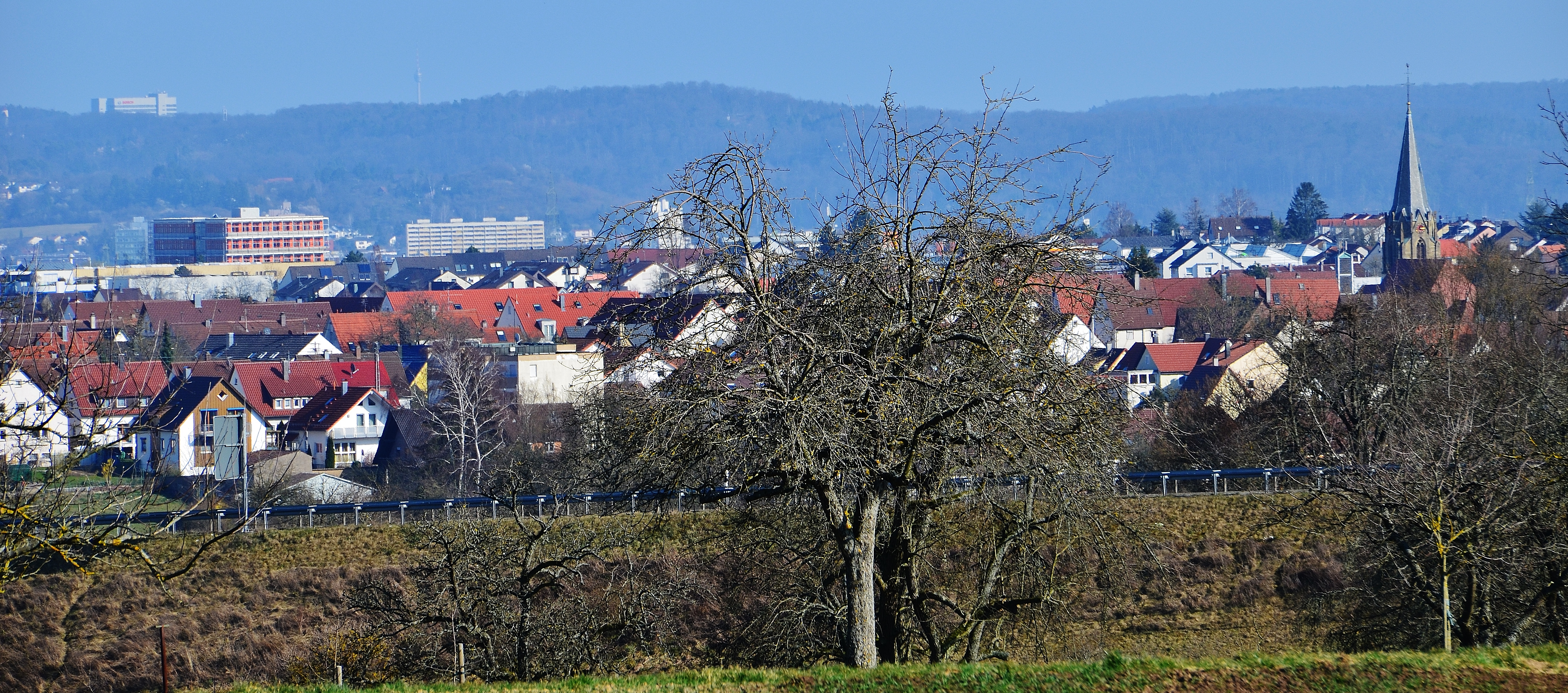
- Rutesheim

- Coat of arms

- Location of Rutesheim within Böblingen district
- Interactive map of Rutesheim
- Location within Germany Location within Baden-Württemberg
- Coordinates: 48°48′35″N 8°56′42″E
- Country: Germany
- State: Baden-Württemberg
- Admin. region: Stuttgart
- District: Böblingen
- Subdivisions: 2 Stadtteile

Government
  - Mayor (2018–26): Susanne Widmaier

Area
  - Total: 16.22 km^{2} (6.26 sq mi)
- Elevation: 447 m (1,467 ft)

Population (2025-12-31)
  - Total: 11,047
  - Density: 681.1/km^{2} (1,764/sq mi)
- Time zone: UTC+01:00 (CET)
  - Summer (DST): UTC+02:00 (CEST)
- Postal codes: 71277
- Dialling codes: 07152
- Vehicle registration: BB
- Website: www.rutesheim.de

Rutesheim (German pronunciation: [ˈʁuːtəsˌhaɪm]) is a town located in the district of Böblingen, Baden-Württemberg, Germany.

== Location ==
Rutesheim is situated directly to the Highway 8 (Bundesautobahn 8), 5 kilometres (3 miles) from the town Leonberg, 18 km (11 mi) from the city Stuttgart and just 22 km (14 mi) from Stuttgart Airport and from the new exhibition center, 7 km (4 mi) way west from the town Heimsheim.

== History ==
Rutesheim was first mentioned in the year 767 in a deed from the convent of Lorsch.

The council of ministers decided on 22 January 2008, to award Rutesheim the designation town on 1 July 2008. Prime Minister Oettinger assigned the deed to the town in a ceremonial act on 26 June 2008.

== Population development ==
The sources are census results (¹) or the data of the statistical office Baden-Württemberg.

Year	Inhabitants
1 December 1871 ¹	1,654
1 December 1880 ¹	1,754
1 December 1890 ¹	1,787
1 December 1900 ¹	1,799
1 December 1910 ¹	1,990
16 June 1925 ¹	2,220
16 June 1933 ¹	2,375
17 May 1939 ¹	2,515
13 September 1950 ¹	3,368

Year	Inhabitants
6 June 1961 ¹	5,273
27 May 1970 ¹	7,719
31 December 1980	8,291
27 May 1987 ¹	8,511
31 December 1990	9,025
31 December 1995	9,515
31 December 2000	9,970
31 December 2005	10,145
31 December 2010	10,249
31 December 2015	10,624

== Politics ==
=== Mayor ===
Since 2018 Susanne Dornes (née Widmaier) has been the mayor of the city.

=== City council ===
The current legislative period lasts until 2014. Distribution of seats after the election of June 2009:

Unabhängige Bürger Rutesheim (UBR)	5 seats
Bürgerliche Wählervereinigung Rutesheim (BWV)	5 seats
Christlich Demokratische Union Deutschlands (CDU)	4 seats
Grün-Alternative Bürgerliste (GABL)	3 seats
Sozialdemokratische Partei Deutschlands (SPD)	2 seats

=== Partnerships ===
- Scheibbs (Niederösterreich), since 1972
- Saalburg-Ebersdorf (Thüringen), since 1989
- Perosa Argentina (Italien), friendship treaty since October 2008

=== Religions ===
There are three Evangelical churches, two New-Apostolic churches, one Evangelical Methodist church and one Roman Catholic church in Rutesheim.

The town has a history with the Waldensians (Perouse).

=== Sport ===
The most well-known sports club from Rutesheim is SKV Rutesheim. Its first football team is playing in the seven-rated Landesliga Württemberg.
