= Bondorf =

- Municipality
- Coat of arms

- Location of Bondorf within Böblingen district
- Interactive map of Bondorf
- Location within Germany Location within Baden-Württemberg
- Coordinates: 48°31′N 08°50′E
- Country: Germany
- State: Baden-Württemberg
- Admin. region: Stuttgart
- District: Böblingen

Government
  - Mayor (2019–27): Bernd Dürr

Area
  - Total: 17.55 km^{2} (6.78 sq mi)
- Elevation: 460 m (1,510 ft)

Population (2025-12-31)
  - Total: 6,196
  - Density: 353.0/km^{2} (914.4/sq mi)
- Time zone: UTC+01:00 (CET)
  - Summer (DST): UTC+02:00 (CEST)
- Postal codes: 71149
- Dialling codes: 07457
- Vehicle registration: BB
- Website: www.bondorf.de

Bondorf (German pronunciation: [ˈboːnˌdɔʁf]) is a municipality in the district of Böblingen in Baden-Württemberg in Germany. It is the southernmost municipality in the Stuttgart administrative district and the Region of Stuttgart.
