= Schönbuch Railway =

Railway line in Germany

Böblingen–Schönaich/Dettenhausen
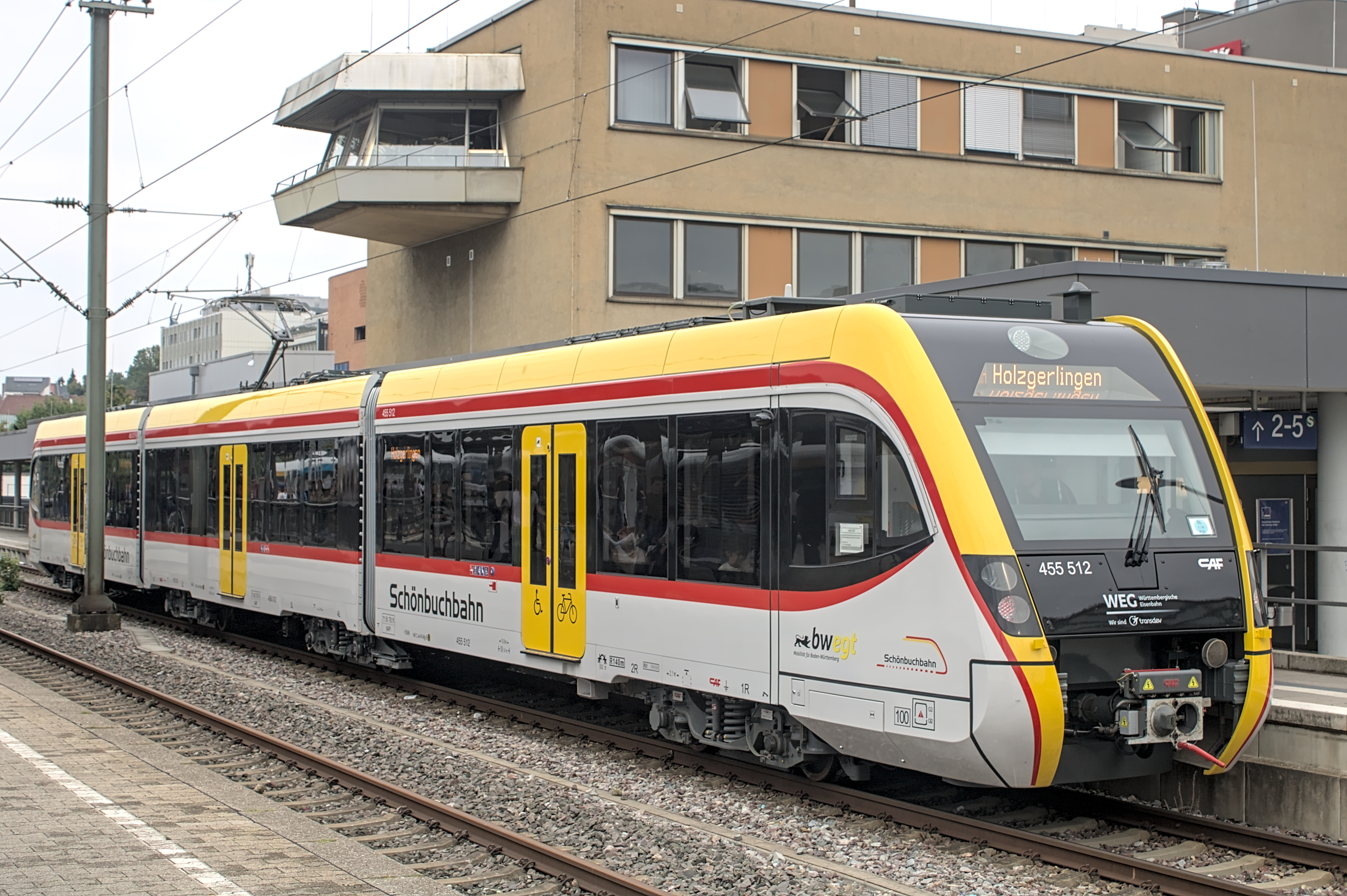
- Nexio train of the Schönbuchbahn

Overview
- Line number: 4871

Service
- Route number: 790.46; 327b (1965)

Technical
- Line length: 17.0 km + 3.02 km
- Track gauge: 1435 mm
- Electrification: 15 kV 16⅔ Hz AC
- Operating speed: 100 km/h (62 mph)

The Schönbuch Railway (German: Schönbuchbahn) is a branch line in the Stuttgart region of the German state of Baden-Württemberg. It is 17.0 kilometres (10.6 mi) long, standard gauge and mostly single track. It links Dettenhausen with Böblingen, where a connection is made with lines S1 and S60 of the Stuttgart S-Bahn. Line S1 provides a direct service to Stuttgart.

The Schönbuchbahn is owned by the Zweckverband Schönbuchbahn (ZVS), and is operated by the Württembergische Eisenbahn-Gesellschaft (WEG), a member of the Veolia Transport group.

The typical service pattern consists of two trains an hour, although the frequency may reduce to one train an hour at weekends or in the evenings.

== History ==
The line was built by the Royal Württemberg State Railways and opened in 1911. Passenger services were withdrawn in 1965, although mixed trains continued operating until 1967. The line remained in use for freight until 1990, after which it was sold by Deutsche Bahn to the Zweckverband Schönbuchbahn (owned by the districts of Böblingen and Tübingen) for one mark plus tax.

In 1996 the line reopened after being modernised with speeds increased from 50 km/h (31 mph) to 80 km/h (50 mph), platform heights raised to 76 cm (30 in) to match train floor heights, five new stations and a new passing loop to allow half-hourly services to operate. Services were operated by a new fleet of Stadler Regio-Shuttle RS1 railcars, with a new workshop built at Dettenhausen to maintain them. Passenger numbers were around twice the expected number of 2500 per day, leading to extra railcars being acquired.

The success of the line led to a second modernisation, beginning in 2016. This included electrification, speeds being raised to 100 km/h (62 mph) and adding a second track for around one third of the line's length in order to allow trains to operate every fifteen minutes as far as Holzgerlingen. New electric trains were ordered from CAF.

== Rolling stock ==
Between reopening and electrification, passenger services on the Schönbuchbahn used a fleet of six partially low floor Stadler Regio-Shuttle RS1 diesel units.

In December 2016 transport authority Zweckverband Schönbuchbahn selected Construcciones y Auxiliar de Ferrocarriles (CAF) for a €51·3m contract to supply nine three-car light rail vehicles of a new design, called Nexio, with a further three vehicles ordered later. The first vehicles were delivered for testing in 2021 but problems with their authorisation (particularly around the braking and rates of deceleration) meant that they did not enter service until 2025.

During the delays to the Nexio trains entering service the diesel Regioshuttles continued in use alongside Class 426 electric units hired from Deutsche Bahn.

== Gallery ==
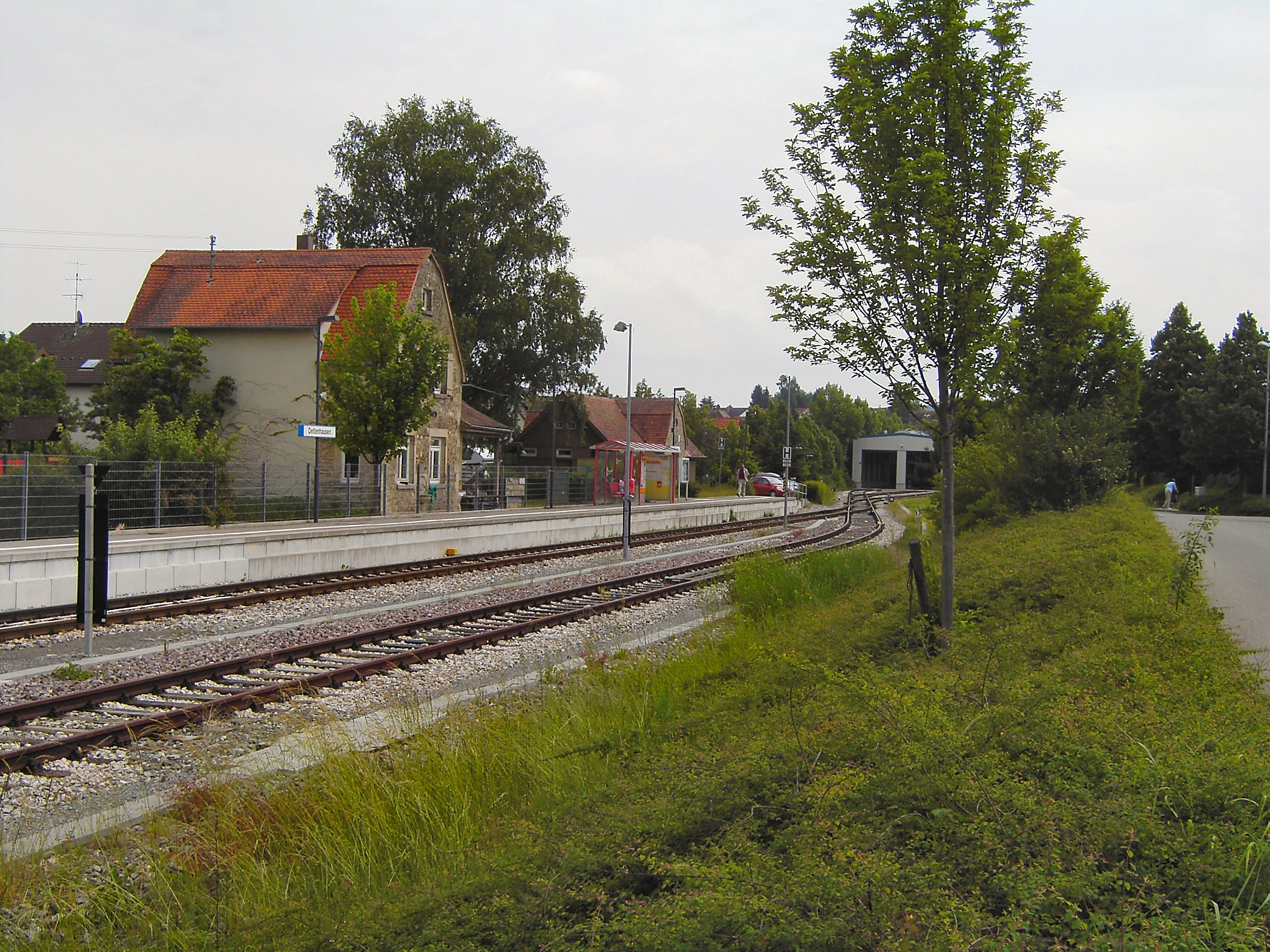
Dettenhausen station

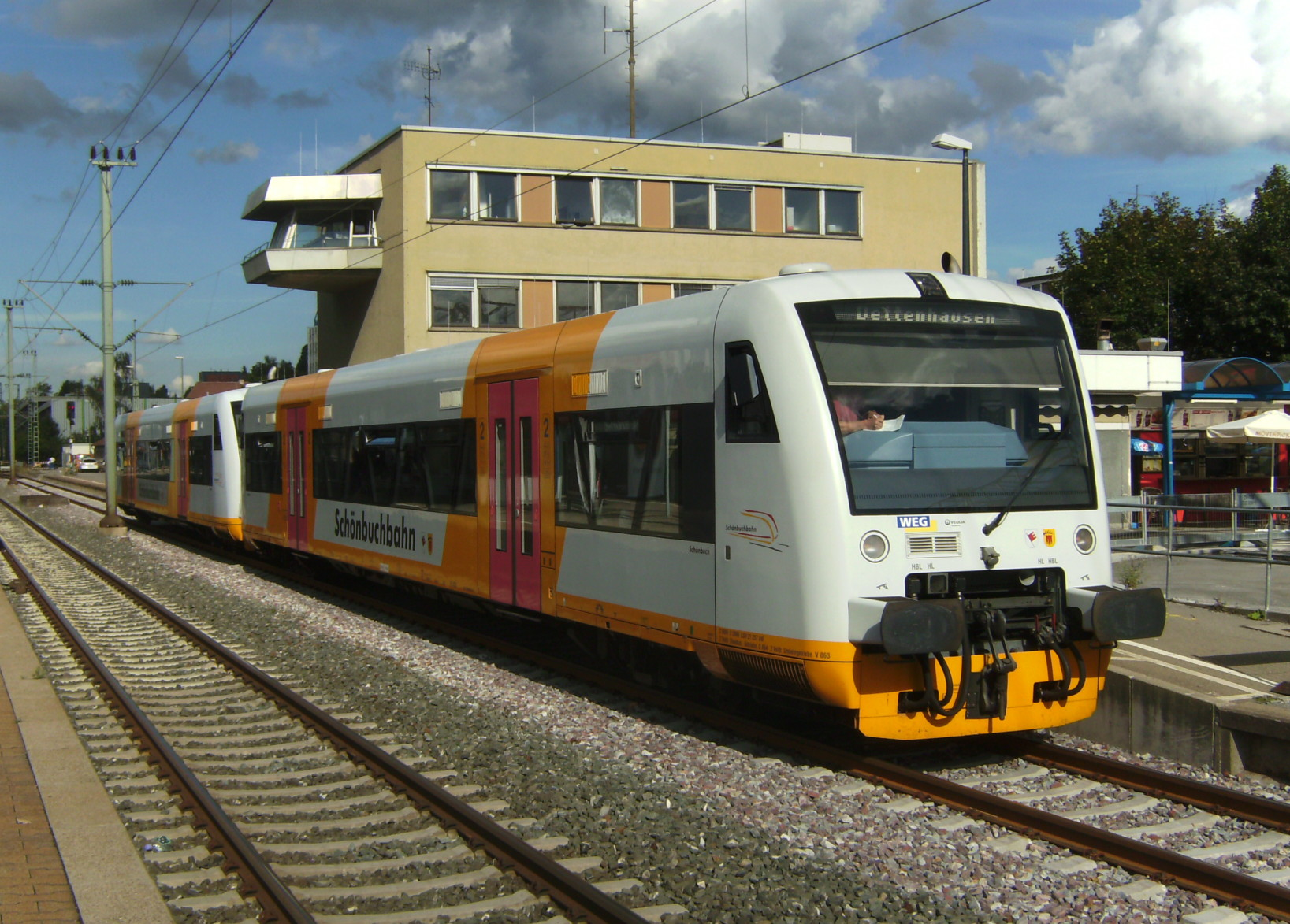
Regio-Shuttles at Böblingen station
