= Herrenberg station =

Railway station in Herrenberg, Germany

Herrenberg
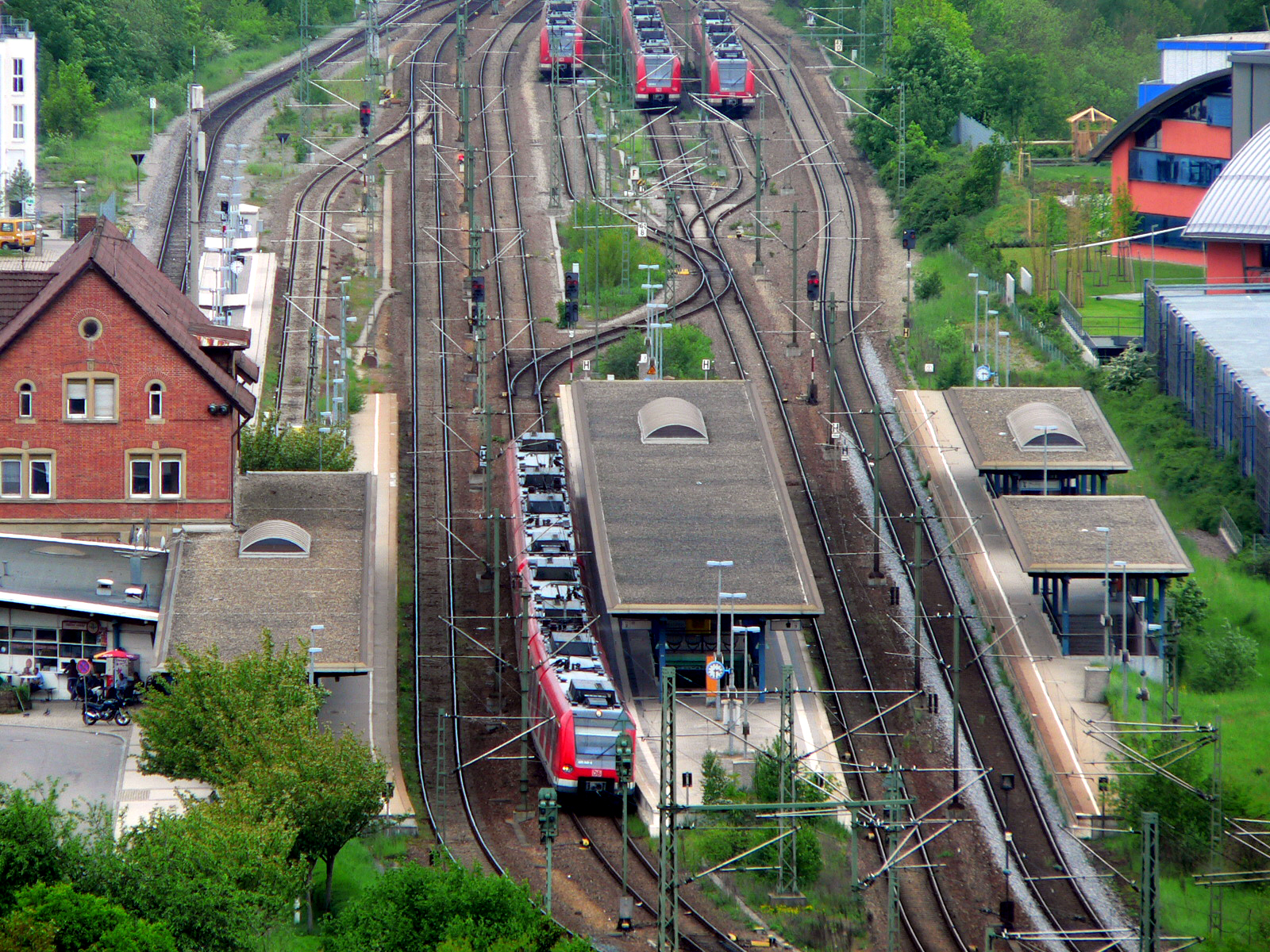

General information
- Location: Bahnhofstr. 14, Herrenberg, Baden-Württemberg; Germany
- Coordinates: 48°35′37″N 8°51′46″E
- Lines: Stuttgart–Horb railway (KBS 740, KBS 790.1); Ammer Valley Railway (KBS 764)
- Platforms: 6

Construction
- Accessible: Yes

Other information
- Station code: 2726
- DS100 code: THE
- IBNR: 8002785
- Category: 3
- Fare zone: : 5; naldo: 501 (VVS transitional tariff)
- Website: www.bahnhof.de

History
- Opened: 2 September 1879

Services
Preceding station	DB Fernverkehr	Following station
Gäufelden towards Zürich HB	IC 87	Böblingen towards Stuttgart Hbf
Preceding station	DB Regio Baden-Württemberg	Following station
Gäufelden towards Rottweil	RE 14a	Böblingen towards Stuttgart Hbf
Gäufelden towards Freudenstadt Hbf	RE 14b	Böblingen towards Stuttgart Hbf
Terminus	RB 63	Herrenberg Zwerchweg towards Bad Urach
Preceding station	Stuttgart S-Bahn	Following station
Terminus	S1	Nufringen towards Kirchheim (Teck)
Location

Herrenberg station is located on the Stuttgart–Horb railway (German: Gäubahn) and is at the start of the Ammer Valley Railway (Ammertalbahn). Because it is a stop for Regional-Express services and it is a terminus for both Stuttgart S-Bahn line S 1 and Regionalbahn services from Tübingen and Bondorf, it is an important transport node. It is located about 200 metres west of the old centre of Herrenberg in the German state of Baden-Württemberg.

== History ==
In the mid 19th century the citizens of Oberamt Herrenberg (one of the former districts of Baden-Württemberg, that were replaced in 1934 by Landkreise) were mostly engaged in agriculture. The most profitable seems to have been the cultivation of sugar beet and hops. In the 1860s, Herrenberg sought a connection to the rail network so that and the district could have access to night soil from the latrines of Stuttgart as cheap fertilizer in order to grow produce for supply to the Böblingen sugar beet factory and the breweries. The cities of Böblingen and Freudenstadt also participated in the campaign. But because of the difficult geographical conditions, the parliament of Württemberg voted not to require the Royal Württemberg State Railways to build the connection sought from Stuttgart via the western Filder plain and the Korngäu district of the northern Black Forest. Only in November 1873 was construction authorised for the railway line, now called the Gäubahn.

On 2 September 1879, the State Railways opened the line. Herrenberg station had the still preserved three-story reception building and the now demolished freight shed. In that year, the trip from Stuttgart to Herrenberg took one hour and 22 minutes. In the 1880s, the freight facilities had to be expanded. Funding of this work involved the city of Herrenberg and the surrounding communities of Kuppingen, Oberjettingen, Unterjettingen and Affstätt, whose inhabitants still hoped to have their own stations.

The railways’ planners foresaw the beginning of a connection from the Gäu Railway to Tübingen. Böblingen campaigned for this line to run from Böblingen, but in 1900 it was decided that the line would run from Herrenberg to the Upper Neckar Railway. The line through the valley of the Ammer was less complicated and costly than the line through the Schönbuch.

At that time, were also plans for a line from Herrenberg to Calw, Althengstett or Wildberg. Two routes were considered to Wildberg but were rejected because such a line would have competed with the Nagold Valley Railway.

Enlargement of the station was necessary for the Ammer Valley Railway. As a new junction, it received several new tracks, a signal box, a locomotive shed with a turntable and a water tower. The Ammer Valley Railway was opened on 12 August 1909 as far as Pfäffinger and on 1 May 1910 to Tübingen. On 25 September 1966, Deutsche Bundesbahn passenger services were abandoned between Herrenberg and Entringen and the line was closed between Herrenberg and Gültstein in 1973.

On 6 December 1992, the station was connected to the Stuttgart S-Bahn network with extension of line S 1, which had earlier ended in Böblingen. After the Zweckverband ÖPNV im Ammertal (Ammer Valley public transport association) acquired the Ammer Valley Railway from Deutsche Bahn in 1996, the restoration of the line could be started. Since 1 August 1999, trains are again running between Herrenberg and Tübingen.

== Operations ==
Herrenberg station is a railway junction on the Gäu Railway, from which the Ammer Valley Railway branches off. Platform track 1 is assigned to Regional-Express services towards Böblingen. Track 2 is used for the start and end on S-Bahn services. Track 3 is used by terminating S-Bahn services, before they are parked in the rear track field. Regional-Express trains to Eutingen im Gäu stop on track 4. Tracks 101 and 102 are terminating tracks, on which Regionalbahn services start to Tübingen and Bondorf. The station is classified by Deutsche Bahn as a category 3 station.

=== Regional Transport ===
Route		Frequency
IC 87 / RE 87	Stuttgart – Herrenberg – Singen (Hohentwiel) – Konstanz	Every 2 hours
RE 14a	Stuttgart – Böblingen – Herrenberg – Bondorf (b Herrenberg) – Eutingen im Gäu – Horb – Rottweil	120 minutes (runs between Stuttgart and Eutingen together with line RE 14B)
RE 14b	Stuttgart – Böblingen – Herrenberg – Bondorf (b Herrenberg) – Eutingen im Gäu – Freudenstadt	120 minutes (runs between Stuttgart and Eutingen together with line RE 14A)
RB 63	Bad Urach – Metzingen (Württ) – Tübingen – Entringen – Herrenberg	30 minutes
RB 14a	Herrenberg – Bondorf (b Herrenberg) (– Eutingen im Gäu – Horb)	Individual pairs of trains in the morning, at noon and in the evening, Mon–Fri

=== S-Bahn ===
Line	Route
S 1	Kirchheim (Teck) – Wendlingen – Plochingen – Esslingen – Neckarpark – Bad Cannstatt – Hauptbahnhof – Schwabstraße – Vaihingen – Rohr – Böblingen – Herrenberg (extra trains in the peak between Esslingen and Böblingen.)

== Gallery ==
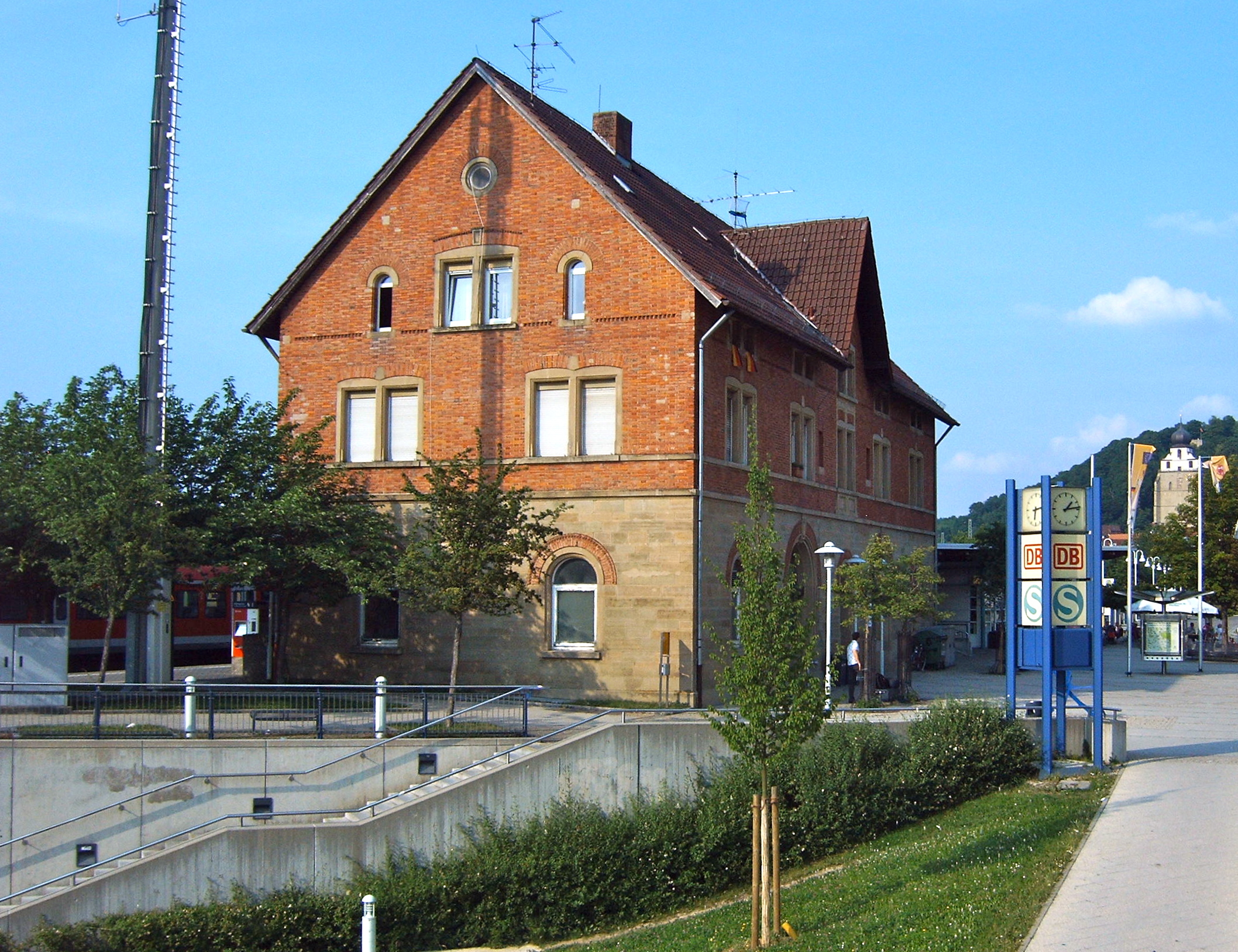
Entrance building, the entrance to the western pedestrian underpass and the forecourt

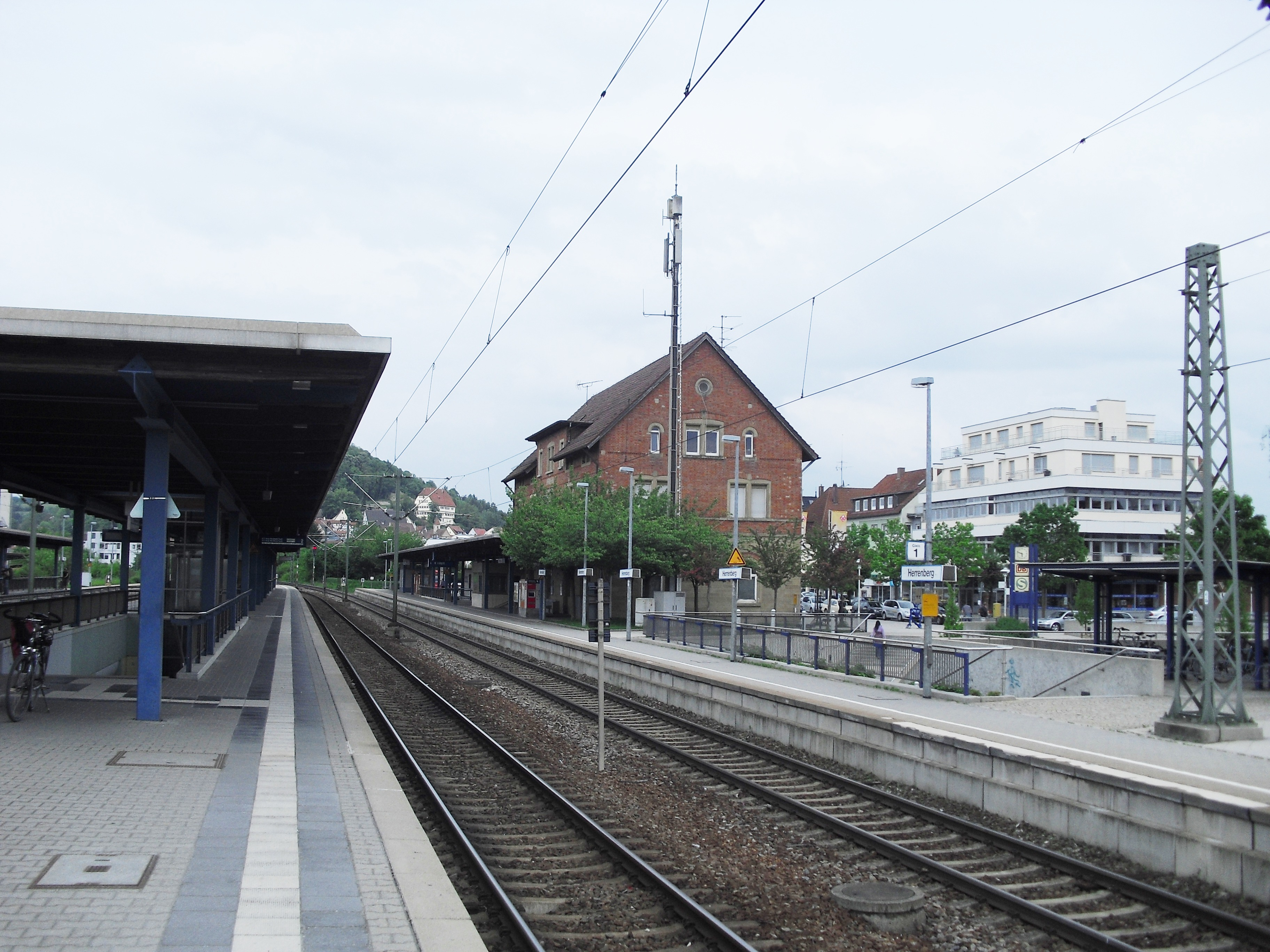
View of tracks 1 and 2
