= Nürtingen–Neuffen railway =

Railway line in Germany

Coordinates: 48°33′32″N 9°22′28″E

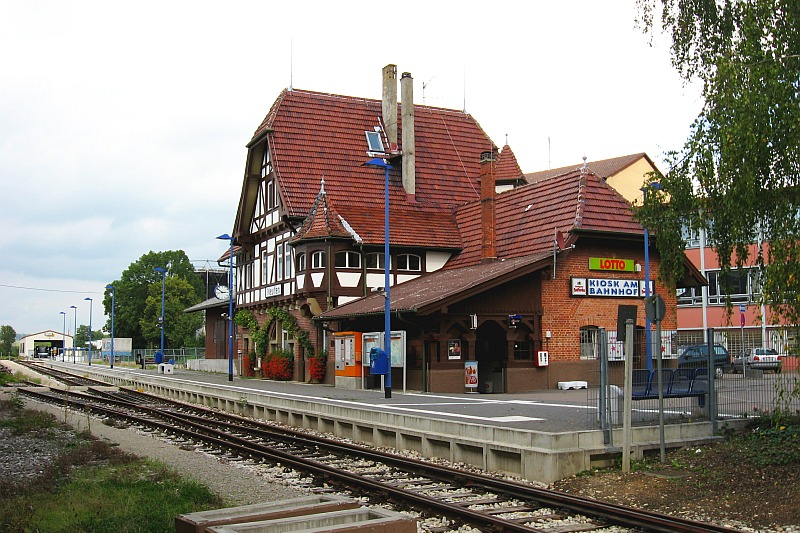
- Neuffen terminal station

Overview
- Native name: Tälesbahn
- Line number: 9465
- Locale: Baden-Württemberg, Germany

Service
- Route number: 762

Technical
- Line length: 8.9 km (5.5 mi)
- Track gauge: 1,435 mm (4 ft 8 1/2 in) standard gauge
- Minimum radius: 190 m (623 ft)
- Operating speed: 80 km/h (49.7 mph) (maximum)
- Maximum incline: 2.2%

The Nürtingen–Neuffen railway, also known as the Tälesbahn ('Valley's Railway'), is a branch line in the Stuttgart region of the German state of Baden-Württemberg. It is single-track and standard gauge, and is 8.9 kilometres (5.5 mi) long. It links Neuffen with Nürtingen, where it connects to the Plochingen–Tübingen railway from Stuttgart to Tübingen.

The line was also opened for freight on 1 June 1900 and for passenger transport on 21 June 1900. It overcomes a height difference of 111 metres. The Tälesbahn is owned and operated by the Württembergische Eisenbahn-Gesellschaft (WEG), a member of the Veolia Transport group. The line is the oldest surviving operation of the WEG.

The WEG operated limestone trains between a quarry near Neuffen and a cement works in Nürtingen until 1979. The trains were hauled by purpose-built railbuses of Class WEG T 23 and 24.

Passenger services on the Tälesbahn use a fleet of 4 Stadler Regio-Shuttle RS1 units with a partial low floor. The typical service pattern consists of either one or two trains an hour, depending on the day and time of day, with each train taking 12 minutes for its journey. Except from regular historical train rides there was until 24 March 2013 no service on Sundays. Since then there is a test running with one train per hour between 10:00 and 20:00.

== Inspiration for Model Railways ==
The Neuffen Station is reproduced as a 1:87 scale (H0) Model Railway plastic kit model by the Vollmer company http://www.vollmer-online.de/de/artikel/art_3510.html. The same company produces other scale versions of the Neuffen Station.

== Gallery ==
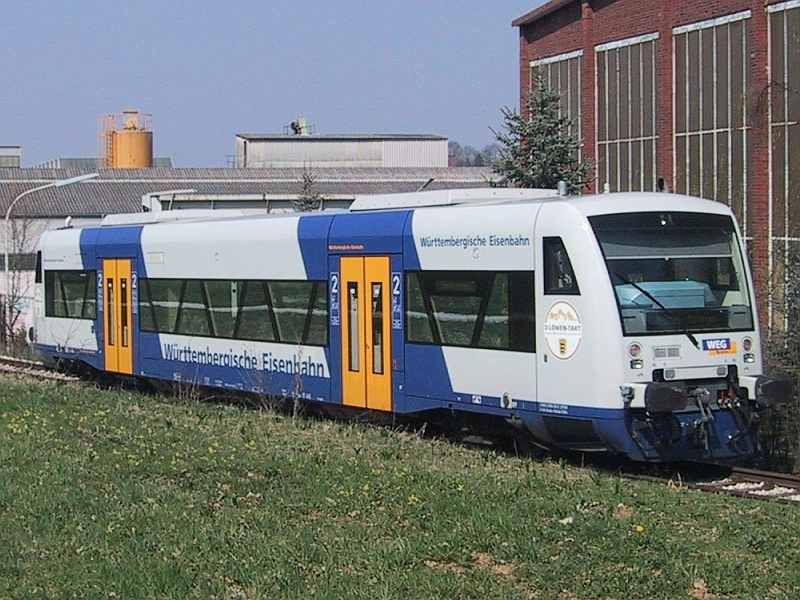
RegioShuttle on the Tälesbahn
