= Bempflingen station =

Railway station in Bempflingen, Germany

Bempflingen
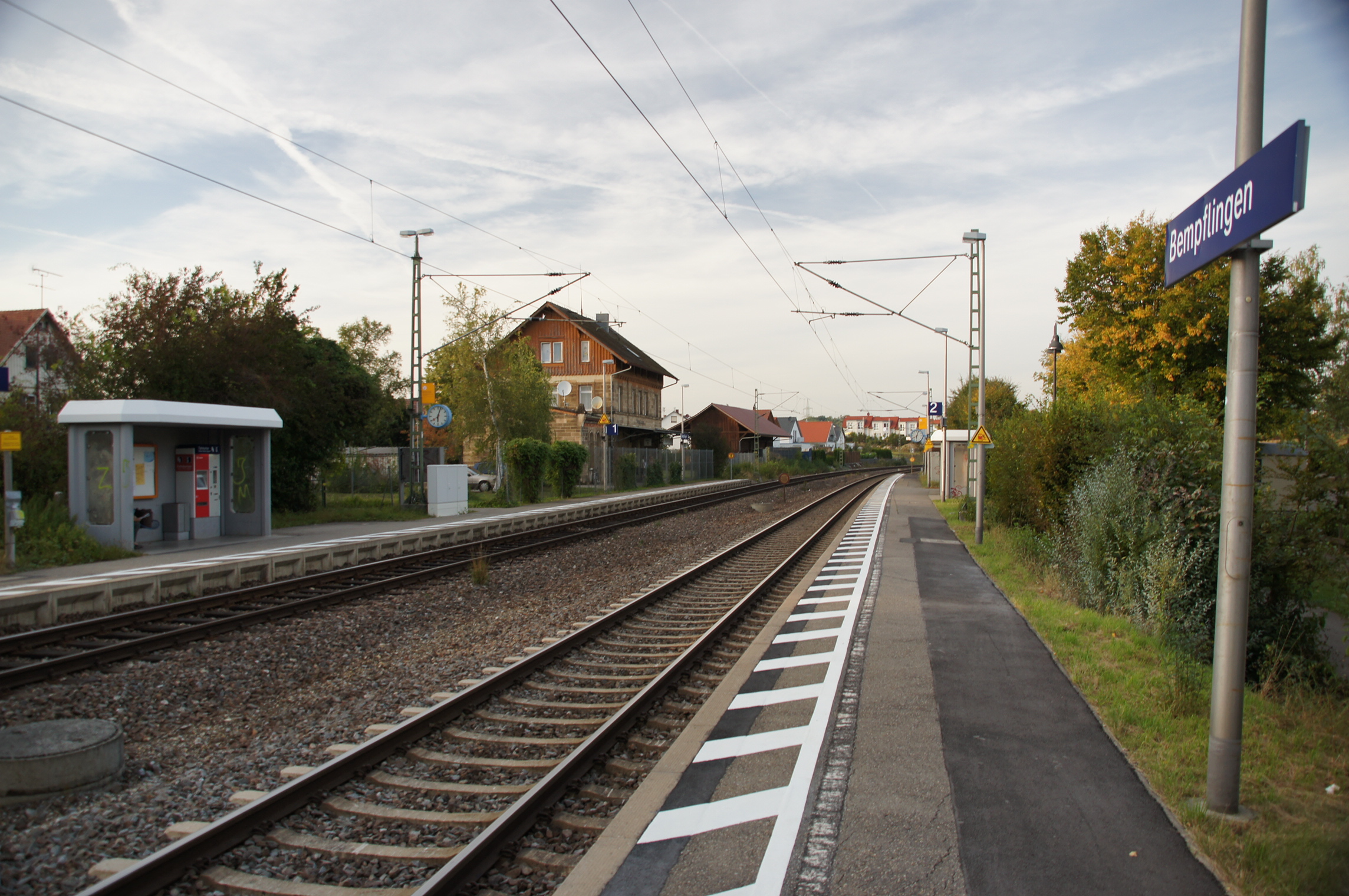
- Bempflingen station

General information
- Location: Bahnhofstraße 30, Bempflingen, Baden-Württemberg; Germany
- Coordinates: 48°34′21″N 9°16′23″E
- Line: Plochingen–Immendingen
- Platforms: 2

Construction
- Accessible: Yes

Other information
- Station code: 479
- DS100 code: TBEM
- IBNR: 8000865
- Category: 6
- Fare zone: naldo: 594; : 5
- Website: www.bahnhof.de

History
- Opened: 20 September 1859
Location

Bempflingen station is located in Bempflingen in the German state of Baden-Württemberg at line kilometre 22.2 of the Plochingen–Immendingen railway. According to the German railway regulations, it should be downgraded from a station to the status of a Haltepunkt (roughly: "halt").

== History ==
=== Planning and construction ===
In the mid-1850s the Royal Württemberg State Railways (Königlich Württembergischen Staats-Eisenbahnen) was planning the construction of the line from Plochingen to Tübingen, then called the Obere Neckarbahn (Upper Neckarbahn). The management of the Elmer & Zweifel company, which had operated a cotton mill in Bempflingen since 1855, called for the construction of a station in Bempflingen. They wrote a petition to the authorities in Stuttgart and promoted the place on behalf of the municipality of Bempflingen and the surrounding communities. The letter stated, inter alia:

Zuffenhausen, Eislingen and other small towns also have halts that hardly have the importance that such would acquire in Bempflingen

Bempflingen, then counting about 700 inhabitants, finally received a station about half a kilometre to the east of the village. This was built on an embankment, which cut the road to Großbettlingen.

A two-storey sandstone station building was built, which is still preserved. The building is covered with a gabled roof. The outer roof beams are covered with wooden slats. Windows and doors on the ground floor were given Rundbogenstil (Romanesque Revival) arches. A platform track and a crossing loop were built at the station.

=== State Railways period ===
On 20 September 1859, the State Railways opened the first section between Plochingen and Reutlingen. On that day, the first post office was opened in Bempflingen, which was located on the ground floor of the entrance building. An underpass was built to reconnect the road to Großbettlingen.

As a result of the building of the cotton mill and the railway, the small community experienced a structural change. In 1895, there were 792 inhabitants, 45 percent of whom worked as farmers.

At the beginning of the 20th century, the State Railways expanded the station building with a single-storey annex to its south. The State Railways completed the double-tracking of the Neckartailfingen–Metzingen line on 1 October 1901. The station received another track as a fast track. The post office relocated from the entrance building in 1909.

=== Reichsbahn period ===
From the mid-1920s, buses competed with the railway, with two routes ending in Bempflingen. The Kraftpost (a part of the post office that formerly operated buses carrying passengers and mail) opened a route from Nürtingen in 1926. A private entrepreneur opened a route from Metzingen in 1927.

Deutsche Reichsbahn completed electrification between Plochingen and Tübingen on 1 October 1934.

There were air raids in the immediate vicinity of the station during the Second World War. One occurred on 9 December 1944. Early in the morning allied fighter-bombers attacked the village. Another low-flying attack on an express train running from Tübingen to Stuttgart took place at lunchtime. This attack claimed three lives. On 25 March 1945, there was a low-flying attack on an express train to Tübingen. This time six were killed and several were injured.

=== Bempflingen as a border station ===
After the war, the Allies divided Württemberg into two occupation zones. The border between the American and French zones ran south of Bempflingen. The station received a new function as a border station. In the timetables of this time, the editors noted that there was a five-minute stay for trains towards Plochingen. In reality, this was not enough. The checks sometimes took up to 25 minutes to complete. The Stuttgart rail administration complained to the two military governments about these delays. The train stops were reduced to two minutes by 1948.

=== Dismantling ===
On 1 August 1988, the Deutsche Bundesbahn abandoned freight operations at Bempflingen. The unneeded goods shed was acquired by the town between 1989 and 1992. The station building has been unused since 1 February 1993. Deutsche Bahn demolished all sidings and sets of points and thus the station should be classified as a halt under the Railway Construction and Operating Regulations. There is now only one direct connection to Stuttgart a day (as of 2011).

== Operations ==
The station is served by regional trains. Trains towards Metzingen (or Herrenberg) stop at platform 1 (next to the station building) and trains towards Nürtingen or Plochingen stop at platform 2.

Regional services (2025)
MEX 12	Tübingen – Reutlingen – Metzingen – Bempflingen – Nürtingen – Plochingen – Stuttgart – Bietigheim-Bissingen – Heilbronn (– Mosbach-Neckarelz)	60 minutes	SWEG Bahn Stuttgart
MEX 18	Tübingen – Reutlingen – Metzingen – Bempflingen – Nürtingen – Wendlingen – Plochingen – Stuttgart – Ludwigsburg – Bietigheim-Bissingen – Heilbronn – Neckarsulm – Bad Friedrichshall – Osterburken	Peak hour services	SWEG Bahn Stuttgart

Bempflingen station is classified by Deutsche Bahn as a category 6 station.
