= WEG T 23 and T 24 =

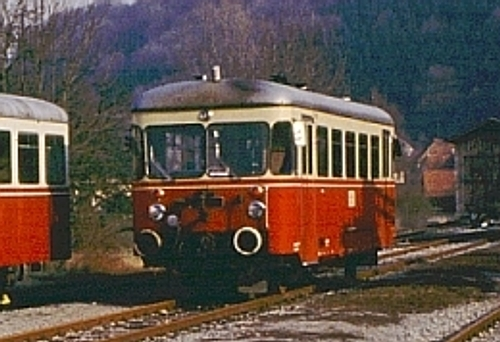
- Ohrnberg station in 1993
- Manufacturer: Gmeinder, Auwärter
- Constructed: 1968
- Number built: 2
- Fleet numbers: WEG: T 23, T 24; WEBA: VS 23, VT 24

Specifications
- Car length: 13.37 m (43 ft 10 in) over buffers
- Maximum speed: 65 km/h (40 mph)
- Weight: 27.4 tonnes (27.0 long tons; 30.2 short tons) (empty)
- Prime mover(s): Büssing U 11 D
- Power output: 2×154 kW (2×210 PS)
- Transmission: hydraulic
- UIC classification: Bo
- Seating: 45
- Track gauge: 1,435 mm (4 ft 8 1/2 in)

The Classes T 23 and T 24 are diesel railbuses which were procured by the Württemberg Railway Company (WEG) and then operated by the Westerwald Railway (WEBA) until 2009 on the Daade Valley Railway and now belong to the Krumbach IGEBA engineer society railway.

The WEG had the two railbuses built in 1968 at Gmeinder and Auwärter for working the branch line from Nürtingen to Neuffen. They were powered by two Büssing engines with a power of 154 kW (210 PS) each. Each motor drove an axle via a Voith 501 drive. Their control system enabled them to be used as a pair.

The two new railbuses hauled heavy limestone trains between a quarry near Neuffen and a cement works in Nürtingen. In order to simplify shunting operations, the WEG fitted the two railbuses and the two end wagons of the limestone trains with Scharfenberg couplers. After the transportation of limestone was ended in October 1979, the two railbuses lost their original operating route and, on 3 October 1979 went to the Lower Kocher Valley Railway where they took over all the services, replacing the diesel Class T 06. The Scharfenberg couplers were thus replaced by normal railway couplings.

After the closure of the Lower Kocher Valley Railway, the two diesel units were sold on 6 September 1996 to WEBA. Both units were modernised at the Gmeinder Works, the T 23 being converted into a VS 23 driving trailer and No. T 24 being redesignated VT 24. The rake was deployed on the Daade Valley Railway between Betzdorf and Daaden for school runs, usually combined with the WEBA 628 677. Due to the lack of suspension, it was given the nickname "wacker plate" (Rüttelplatte).

The vehicles were later sold to the IGEBA engineer society railway in Krumbach and driven away from the Westerwald region in September 2009.

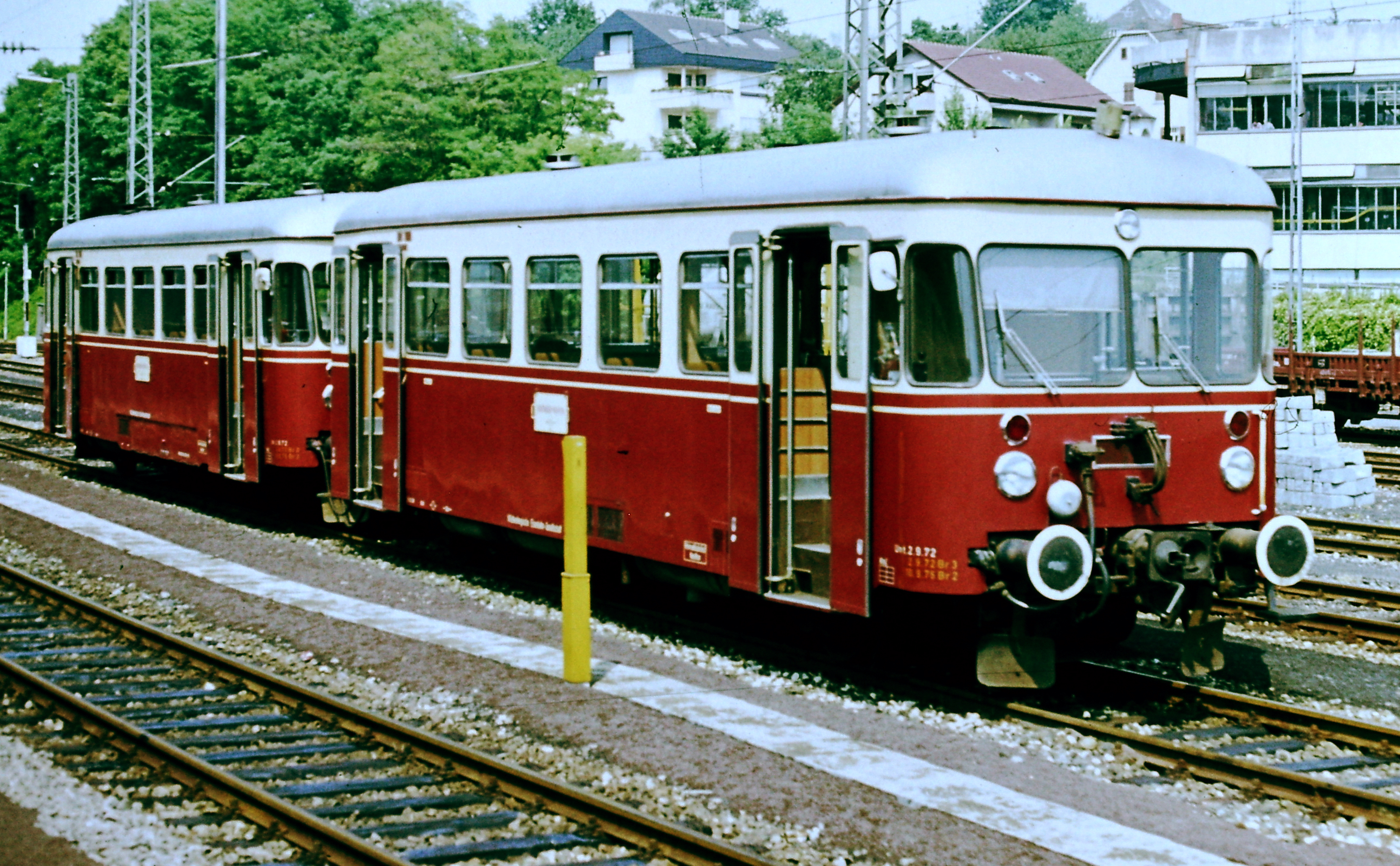
T23 and T24 in Nürtingen station

== Literature ==
- Hermann Bürnheim (1986), Württembergische Eisenbahn-Gesellschaft. Die Geschichte einer bedeutenden Privatbahn (in German) (1. ed.), Stuttgart: Motorbuch Verlag, ISBN 3-613-01145-X
