= Metzingen (Württemberg) station =

Railway station in Metzingen, Germany

Metzingen (Württ)
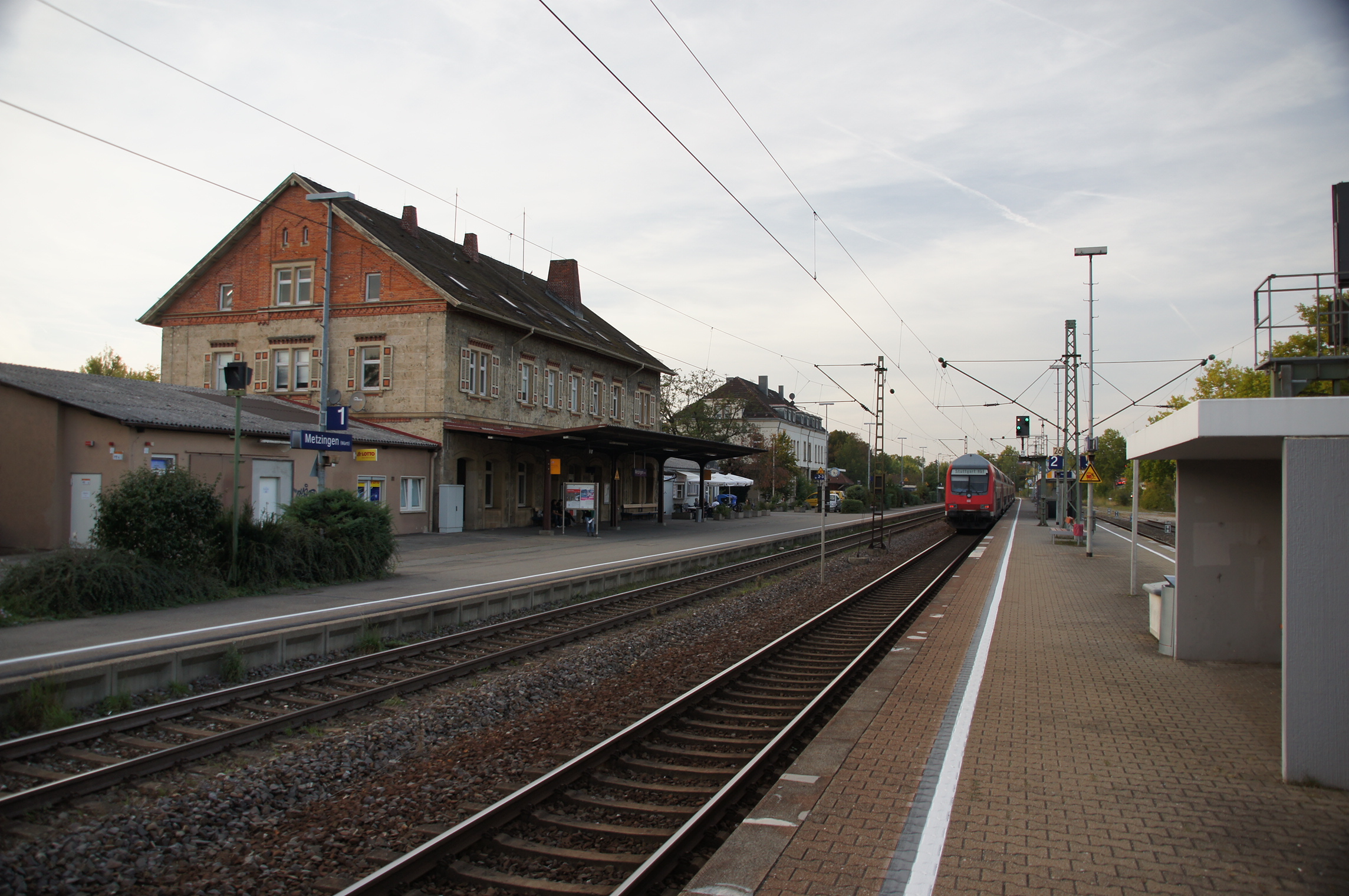
- Metzingen station

General information
- Location: Eisenbahnstr. 24, Metzingen, Baden-Württemberg; Germany
- Coordinates: 48°32′20″N 9°17′24″E
- Lines: Plochingen–Immendingen; Metzingen–Bad Urach
- Platforms: 3

Construction
- Accessible: No

Other information
- Station code: 4087
- DS100 code: TME
- IBNR: 8004009
- Category: 4
- Fare zone: naldo: 219
- Website: www.bahnhof.de

History
- Opened: 20 September 1859

Services
Preceding station	DB Fernverkehr	Following station
Nürtingen towards Dresden Hbf	IC 55	Reutlingen Hbf towards Tübingen Hbf
Preceding station	DB Regio Baden-Württemberg	Following station
Terminus	RB 63	Reutlingen-Sondelfingen towards Herrenberg
Preceding station	(Stuttgart)	Following station
Nürtingen towards Stuttgart Hbf	RE 6	Reutlingen Hbf towards Tübingen Hbf
Bempflingen towards Heilbronn	MEX 12	Reutlingen Hbf towards Tübingen Hbf
Nürtingen towards Osterburken	MEX 18	Reutlingen Hbf towards Tübingen Hbf
Location

Metzingen (Württemberg) station (abbreviated: Metzingen (Württ)) is a railway junction in Metzingen in the German state of Baden-Württemberg. It is on the Plochingen–Immendingen railway, where the Erms Valley Railway (Ermstalbahn) branches off to Bad Urach. It is served by a pair of InterCity trains and regional trains.

== History ==
=== Planning and construction ===
During the construction of the Plochingen–Tübingen railway, the Royal Württemberg State Railways (Königlich Württembergischen Staats-Eisenbahnen) already foresaw Metzingen becoming a railway junction. The town council asked the State Railways for a station to be built west of the Erms. Instead the tracks were laid to the east of town to allow a better alignment and to facilitate the connection of the projected railway line towards Urach.

=== State Railways period ===
On 20 September 1859, the State Railways opened the Plochingen–Reutlingen section. The entrance building, which housed the post office in the beginning, has been preserved. The railway to Urach, with a possible continuation to Münsingen planned, was opened from a junction in Metzingen on 27 December 1873. This line was initially operated by the private Ermsthalbahn-Gesellschaft ("Erms Valley Railway Company").

The State Railways completed the double-tracking of the Neckartailfingen–Metzingen line on 1 October 1901. It took over operations on the Erms Valley Railway on 1 April 1904. An iron footbridge enabled passengers to reach the island platform from 31 August 1907.

On 8 November 1912, the council complained about the entrance building, the size of which, in their opinion, was no longer sufficient. Its deficiencies were mainly in the loading of luggage and goods. At this time, agriculture was still important to Metzingen. Farmers mainly loaded fruit, vegetables, wine, beef, pork and lumber. But even leather and iron goods were despatched at the station.

=== Reichsbahn period ===
Electrification was completed between Plochingen and Tübingen on 1 October 1934. Deutsche Reichsbahn accelerated the operation of freight traffic on this section in 1938. This included the removal of long stays by freight trains in Metzingen. The station's operations area received a small locomotive for the shunting of freight trains. The Reichsbahn erected a wooden shed for them at the crossing of Reichsstrasse 28 (now Ulmerstraße). It was mockingly called Südbahnhof ("south station") by the Metzingen population. The local Nazis railed against the building. The Nationalsozialistischen Mitteilungsblatt (“National Socialist Bulletin”) published an article entitled Metzingen wehrt sich gegen Bausünden ("Metzingen resists eyesores"), in which they demanded its demolition, but this did not happen.

=== Bundesbahn period ===
In 1959, one hundred years after the opening, 130 trains stopped at or passed through Metzingen each day. 112 ran on the Plochingen–Tübingen line and 18 ran on the branch line to Urach. Of these, 92 were passenger trains and 24 were freight trains. In addition there were 14 other scheduled trains, such as service trains and empty rolling stock movements. The high frequency made it essential to expand the station building, which was carried out in 1960. The old goods shed south of the station building had to be demolished in 1962 for the works. Deutsche Bundesbahn replaced it in 1972.

In the following years, rail traffic was reduced by the growth in the use of cars. The Bundesbahn discontinued passenger services on the Erms Valley Railway on 27 May 1976. The iron bridge from 1907 was replaced by an underpass in May 1982. It was removed in the following year. On 1 January 1988, the last freight was handled at Metzingen station. The shed for the small locomotive, which was now unneeded, was demolished.

=== Deutsche Bahn period ===
With the recommencement of passenger services on the Erms Valley Railway using DMUs on 1 August 1999, Metzingen once again became a railway junction. Since the timetable change on 13 December 2009, a pair of InterCity trains has stopped in Metzingen. The unused goods shed was demolished in June 2011 to create a site for a commercial building and parking.

Since 2016, Deutsche Bahn has made a number of changes in the station, including the dismantling of a track.

As part of a track renovation, a level crossing (cart crossing) to the platform for tracks 2 and 3 was removed. This means that the platform is no longer accessible. Preliminary planning for barrier-free access began in 2016. Due to the narrow platform width, a lift could only have been installed provisionally and not before 2019. Widening the platform would have required a comprehensive redesign of the track system, costing almost €10 million. The start of construction was celebrated on 27 January 2022. The €10.5 million project was scheduled for completion in 2024. On 18 July 2023, work began on raising the platform on track 1 to 76 cm (30 in).

== Entrance building ==
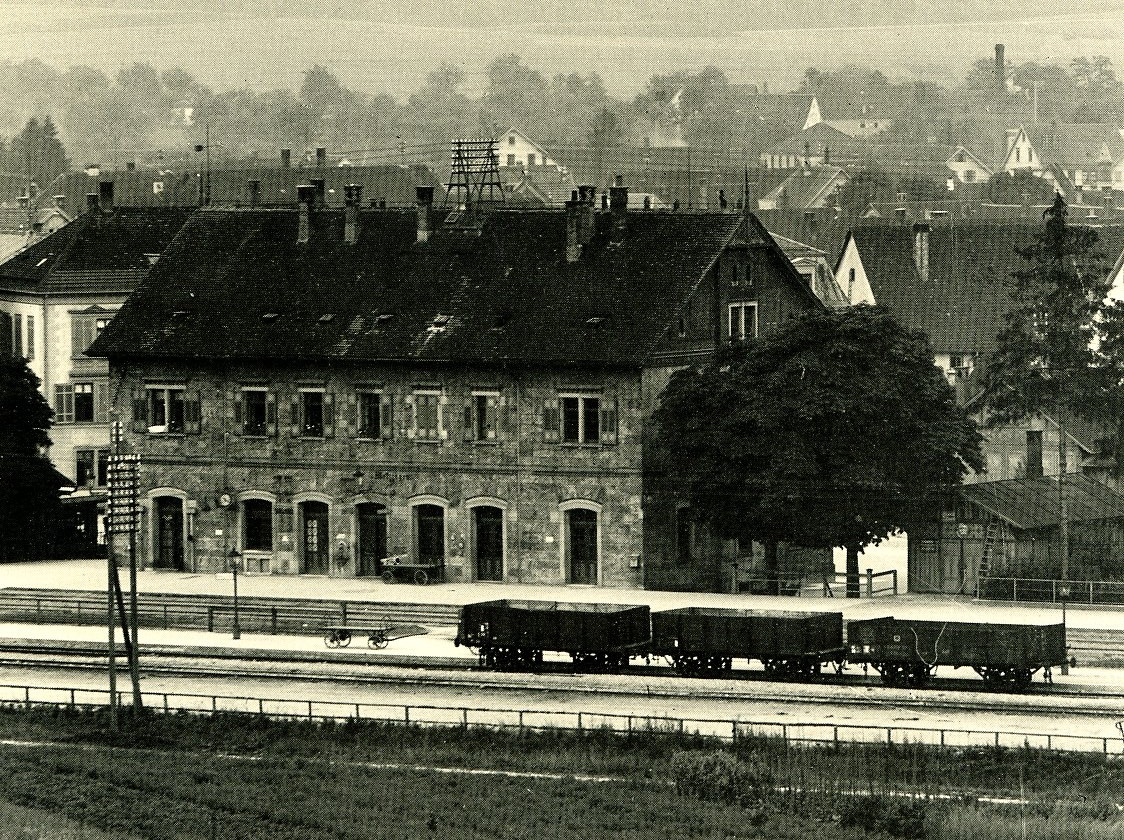
Metzingen station in 1906

The station building is a two-storey building with gabled roof. The windows and doors on the ground floor differ from the windows upstairs as they are built in the Rundbogenstil (“round arch style” or Romanesque Revival). The exterior walls in the ground and first floors consist of light-colored sandstone. The facade of the gabled-roof storey is bright red clinker brick. It had brick interiors with cornices.

The original main building has a length of 25.78 metres and a width of 14.32 metres. The narrow main hall of the building was open at first. In 1888, the State Railways installed doors.

On the ground floor there were 2nd and 3rd class waiting rooms, as well as premises for the railway and the post office. The upper floor was used for staff housing.

A telephone connection was installed at the Metzingen post office on 1 March 1889. The post office left the entrance building in 1893 and moved into the separate post office building that had been built to the north of the entrance building.

Deutsche Bundesbahn enlarged the building in 1960. The northern one-storey extension has since housed a tavern. In addition, for the first time, toilets were installed inside the building. It is 18 metres long and 12.49 metres wide. The 15.5 metre-long and 14.32 metre wide single-storey annexe to the south was built for the handling of baggage and express freight.

== Operations ==
The station has three platform tracks. Trains towards Reutlingen stop at platform 1 (next to the station building) and trains towards Nürtingen stop at platform 2. Trains running towards Bad Urach start at platform 3.

Track 4 formerly had a weighbridge, but this is no longer in operation.

Long-distance services
Line	Route	Frequency
IC 55	Dresden – Leipzig – Halle – Magdeburg – Braunschweig – Hanover – Bielefeld – Dortmund – Hagen – Wuppertal – Solingen – Cologne – Bonn – Koblenz – Mainz – Mannheim – Stuttgart – Metzingen – Reutlingen – Tübingen	1 train pair

Regional services
RE 6	Stuttgart – Metzingen – Reutlingen – Tübingen	Every 2 hours
MEX 12	Tübingen – Reutlingen – Metzingen – Bempflingen – Nürtingen – Oberboihingen – Wendlingen (Neckar) – Plochingen – Esslingen (Neckar) – Stuttgart – Heilbronn – (Mosbach)	Hourly
MEX 18	Tübingen – Reutlingen – Metzingen – Nürtingen – Wendlingen (Neckar) – Plochingen – Esslingen (Neckar) – Stuttgart – Heilbronn – Osterburken	Hourly
RB 63	Herrenberg – Tübingen – Reutlingen – Metzingen – Bad Urach	Hourly every 30 minutes (Herrenberg–Metzingen)

Metzingen station is classified by Deutsche Bahn as a category 4 station.
