= Erms Valley Railway =

Branch line in Baden-Württemberg, Germany

Overview
- Native name: Ermstalbahn
- Line number: 763
- Locale: Baden-Württemberg, Germany
- Termini: Metzingen (Württ) 48.5397°N 9.2900°E; Bad Urach 48.4914°N 9.3961°E

Service
- Route number: 4621

Technical
- Line length: 12.260 km (7.618 mi)
- Track gauge: 1,435 mm (4 ft 8 1/2 in) standard gauge
- Minimum radius: 350 m (1,148.3 ft)
- Electrification: 15 kV/16.7 Hz AC overhead catenary
- Operating speed: 80 km/h (49.7 mph) (maximum)
- Maximum incline: 1.455%

The Erms Valley Railway (German: Ermstalbahn, originally written as Ermsthalbahn) is a single-track electrified branch line in the German state of Baden-Württemberg. It links Metzingen, where it branches off from the Plochingen–Tübingen railway with Bad Urach (called Urach until July 1983) on the northern edge of the Swabian Jura (Schwäbische Alb). For its entire length, the branch line follows the Erms river and it is now operated by the Erms-Neckar-Bahn Eisenbahninfrastruktur AG (ENAG).

== History ==
The Erms Valley Railway was opened on 27 December 1873 as a private railway by the Ermsthalbahn-Gesellschaft ("Erms Valley Railway Company"). The concession consigned the railway with effect from 1 April 1904 to the Kingdom of Württemberg, after which the railway was controlled by the Royal Württemberg State Railways (Königlich Württembergischen Staats-Eisenbahnen). On 2 August 1919, the line was extended by 1.194 km to Kunstmühle Künkele. Although this extension was only for the carriage of freight to the mill, provision was made for the construction of an envisaged extension towards Münsingen, which would have created a link to the Reutlingen–Schelklingen railway. After the First World War, the line became part of Deutsche Reichsbahn, which was founded in 1920, and after the Second World War it was taken over by Deutsche Bundesbahn (DB).

The temporary closure of the railway began in the summer of 1971; the DB abandoned operations on the last section between the loading point of the URACA pump factory and Kunstmühle. On Friday, 27 May 1976, the last regular passenger service ran to Urach, but freight traffic was still maintained to URACA. Special excursion trains also operated on the line. In July 1983, Urach was declared to be a spa town and renamed Bad Urach, but freight traffic continued to fall. At the end of 1989, the sparse freight between the crossing loop at Dettingen Gsaidt and Bad Urach was finally abandoned.

The aspirations of the neighbouring communities, especially the spa town of Bad Urach, to revive rail transport led first to the establishment of the Ermstal-Verkehrsgesellschaft mbH ("Erms Valley Transport Company", EVG). This took over the line on 28 December 1993 with effect from 1 January 1994 from the former Deutsche Bundesbahn for the symbolic price of one Deutschmark. In 1995, the EVG was reformed as the Erms-Neckar-Bahn AG (ENAG) in Bad Urach. In May 1998, tourist traffic began on weekends and public holidays. Regular passenger traffic to Bad Urach was resumed on 1 August 1999. In this context, three new stations were put into operation in the municipality of Dettingen an der Erms (Dettingen-Lehen, Dettingen-Freibad and Dettingen-Gsaidt). In 2004, the Bad Urach Ermstalklinik station was opened and the maximum line speed was increased to 80 km/h.

From 2019 to 2022, the line was upgraded and electrified as part of the establishment of the Regionalstadtbahn Neckar-Alb ("Neckar-Alb regional light rail"). The Tübingen regional council gave planning approval in February 2017, and construction began in October 2019. The implementation of "Module 1" by ENAG was subsidised by the districts of Reutlingen and Tübingen as well as the cities of Reutlingen, Metzingen, Bad Urach and the municipality of Dettingen. All stations were upgraded to a uniform platform length of 80 metres and a height of 55 centimetres. In Dettingen-Gsaidt, a two-track crossing station with a central platform was built by the end of 2020.

== Operations ==
Regionalbahn trains on line RB63 run every hour from Herrenberg running via the Ammer Valley Railway and the Plochingen–Tübingen railway to Bad Urach. The service is operated by DB Regio (previously DB ZugBus Regionalverkehr Alb-Bodensee [RAB]) on behalf of the state of Baden-Württemberg. The company uses Alstom Coradia Continental electric multiple units. Until December 2022, Stadler Regio-Shuttle RS 1 diesel multiple units were used. Parallel to the Erms Valley Railway, the RAB also operates bus, the timetables of which are coordinated with the train timetable. The Erms Valley Railway has been fully integrated in the Verkehrsverbund Neckar-Alb-Donau (Naldo) transport association since 1 January 2002.

As part of the establishment of the Neckar-Alb regional light rail system, dual-system light rail sets are expected to be used on the line from 2027.
