= Reutlingen Hauptbahnhof =

Railway station in Reutlingen, Germany

Reutlingen Hbf
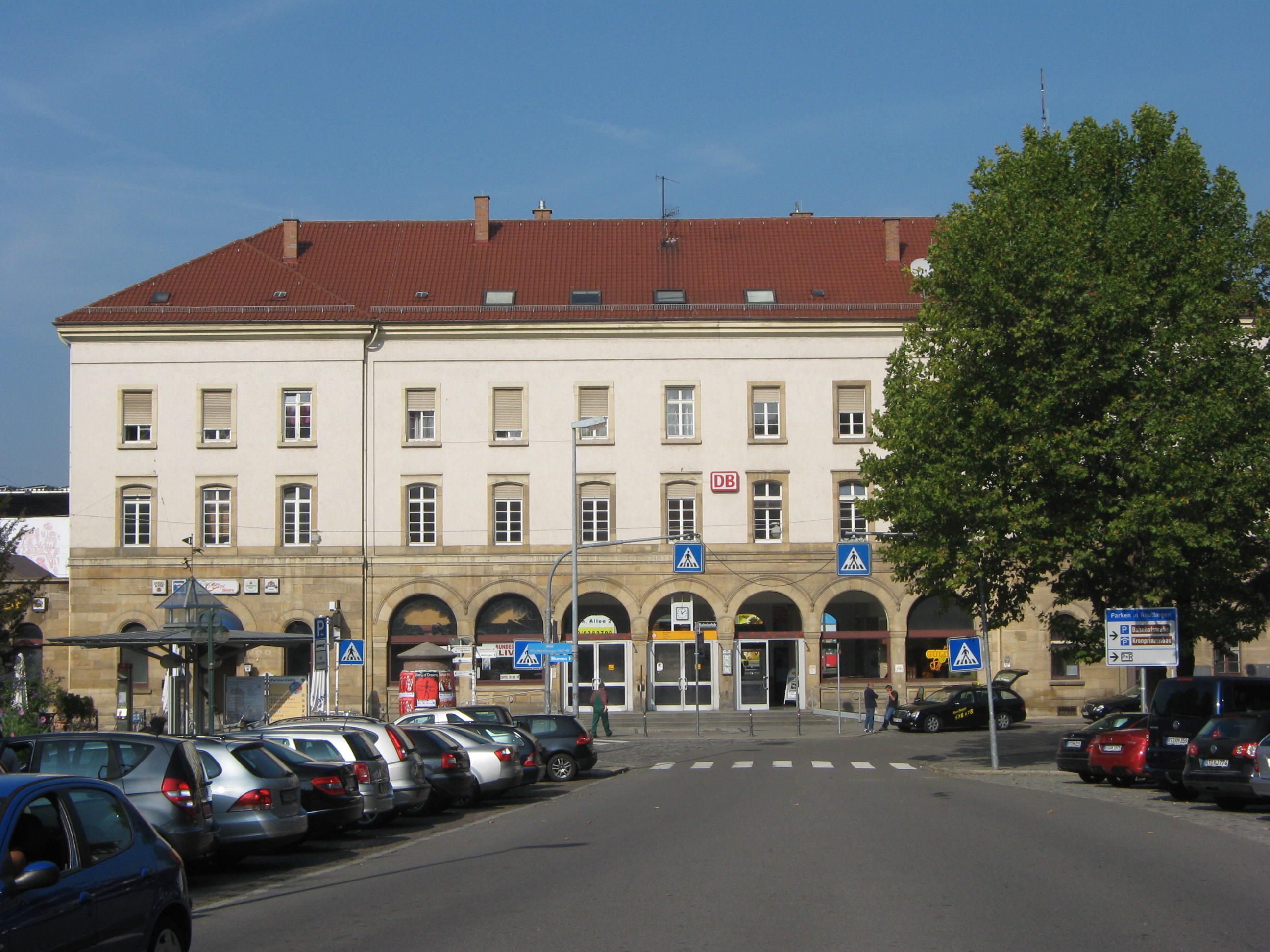
- Front of the station building

General information
- Location: Bahnhofstr. 3, Reutlingen, Baden-Württemberg; Germany
- Coordinates: 48°29′46″N 9°12′33″E
- Owner: Deutsche Bahn
- Operator: DB Netz; DB Station&Service
- Lines: Plochingen–Immendingen railway (KBS 760); Gönningen Railway (closed); Swabian Jura Railway (closed to Reutlingen); Reutlingen–Eningen local railway (closed)
- Platforms: 3

Construction
- Accessible: Yes

Other information
- Station code: 5242
- DS100 code: TRE
- IBNR: 8000314
- Category: 3
- Fare zone: naldo: 220
- Website: www.bahnhof.de

History
- Opened: 20 September 1859
Services
Preceding station	DB Regio Baden-Württemberg	Following station
Stuttgart Hbf Terminus	RE 6a	Tübingen Hbf towards Aulendorf
Stuttgart Hbf Terminus	RE 6b	Tübingen Hbf towards Rottenburg
Reutlingen-Sondelfingen towards Metzingen	RB 63	Reutlingen West towards Herrenberg
Preceding station	(Stuttgart)	Following station
Metzingen (Württ) towards Stuttgart Hbf	RE 6	Tübingen Hbf Terminus
Metzingen (Württ) towards Heilbronn	MEX 12	Tübingen Hbf Terminus
Metzingen (Württ) towards Osterburken	MEX 18	Tübingen Hbf Terminus
Location

Reutlingen Hauptbahnhof is the main station in Reutlingen in the German State of Baden-Württemberg. In addition the city has halts (Haltepunkte) at Reutlingen West and in the suburbs of Betzingen and Sondelfingen. They all lie on the Plochingen–Immendingen railway. Reutlingen Süd (south) station (formerly called Eningen station) is no longer in operation.

== History ==
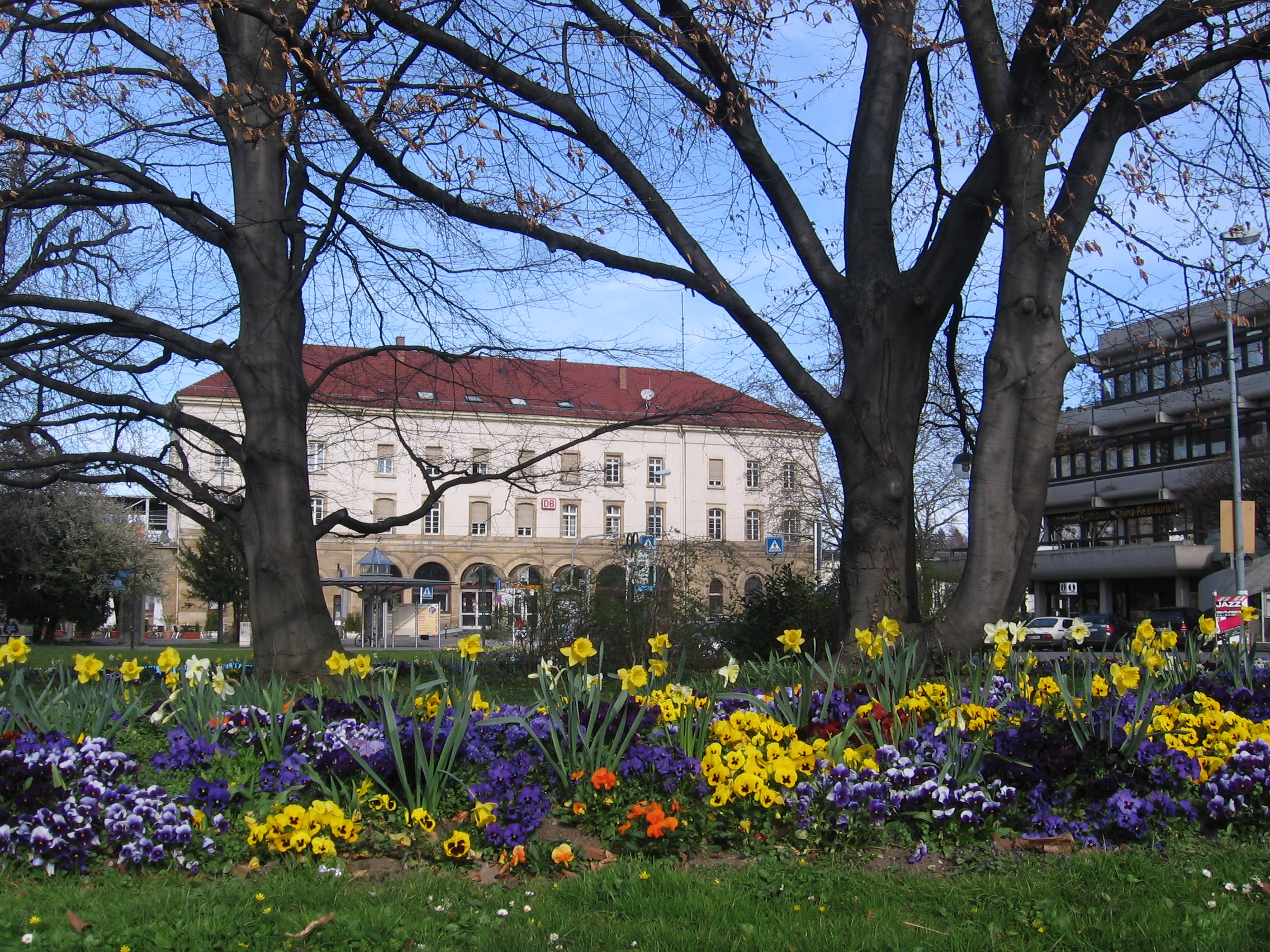
Exterior of station with square in spring.

After the citizens of Reutlingen had actively participated in the Revolution of 1848-49, the Württemberg government deliberately delayed the construction of the railway from Plochingen to Reutlingen. The station was finally opened on 20 September 1859. It had an administration building and a customs house, a freight shed, a locomotive depot and a repair workshop with a water supply point.

Until 1994, the Swabian Jura Railway (Schwäbische Albbahn) branched in Reutlingen station. The section of the line from Reutlingen to Kleinengstingen is now closed and dismantled. Until 1985, the Gönningen Railway branched here connecting Reutlingen and Gönningen. In addition, from 1899 to 1974 the Lokalbahn Reutlingen–Eningen (a tramway) operated from the station to Eningen unter Achalm.

== Services ==
Since the timetable change in December 2009, Intercity trains served Reutlingen. From December 2023, a pair of trains ran on line 55 to Dresden, but this was discontinued in 2025. Regionalbahn services run from Reutlingen to Bad Urach, Herrenberg, Horb am Neckar and Plochingen and Regional-Express services run to Stuttgart and Tübingen. Interregio-Express services connect to Aulendorf, Rottenburg am Neckar and Stuttgart. In the 2026 timetable, the following services stop at the station:

Line	Route		Frequency	Operator
RE 6a	Aulendorf – Herbertingen – Sigmaringen – Albstadt-Ebingen – Balingen – Hechingen –	Tübingen (train split/joined) – Reutlingen – Stuttgart	Every two hours	DB Regio Baden-Württemberg
RE 6b	Rottenburg –	Tübingen (train split/joined) – Reutlingen – Stuttgart	Every two hours	DB Regio Baden-Württemberg
RE 6	Tübingen – Reutlingen – Metzingen – Stuttgart		Every two hours	SWEG Bahn Stuttgart
MEX 12	Tübingen – Reutlingen – Metzingen – Bempflingen – Nürtingen – Oberboihingen – Wendlingen – Plochingen – Esslingen	– Stuttgart – Heilbronn – (Mosbach-Neckarelz)	Hourly	SWEG Bahn Stuttgart
MEX 12	Tübingen – Reutlingen – Metzingen – Bempflingen – Nürtingen – Oberboihingen – Wendlingen – Plochingen – Esslingen	– Stuttgart Hbf	Additional peak hour services	SWEG Bahn Stuttgart
MEX 18	Tübingen – Reutlingen – Metzingen – Nürtingen – Wendlingen – Plochingen – Esslingen – Stuttgart – Heilbronn – Osterburken		Hourly	SWEG Bahn Stuttgart
RB 63	Herrenberg – Tübingen – Reutlingen – Metzingen (– Bad Urach)		Herrenberg–Metzingen: every 30 minutes; Metzingen–Bad Urach: hourly	DB Regio Baden-Württemberg

=== Local transport ===
The station from 1899 to 1974 was the focal point of the Reutlingen Tramway. Today it has this role for most of the bus lines of the city bus company, Reutlinger Stadtverkehrsgesellschaft (RSV).

== Infrastructure ==
Reutlingen station has three main platform tracks. The sprawling freight yard has been closed for some years, but the tracks are intact.
