= Nürtingen station =

Railway station in Nürtingen, Germany

Nürtingen
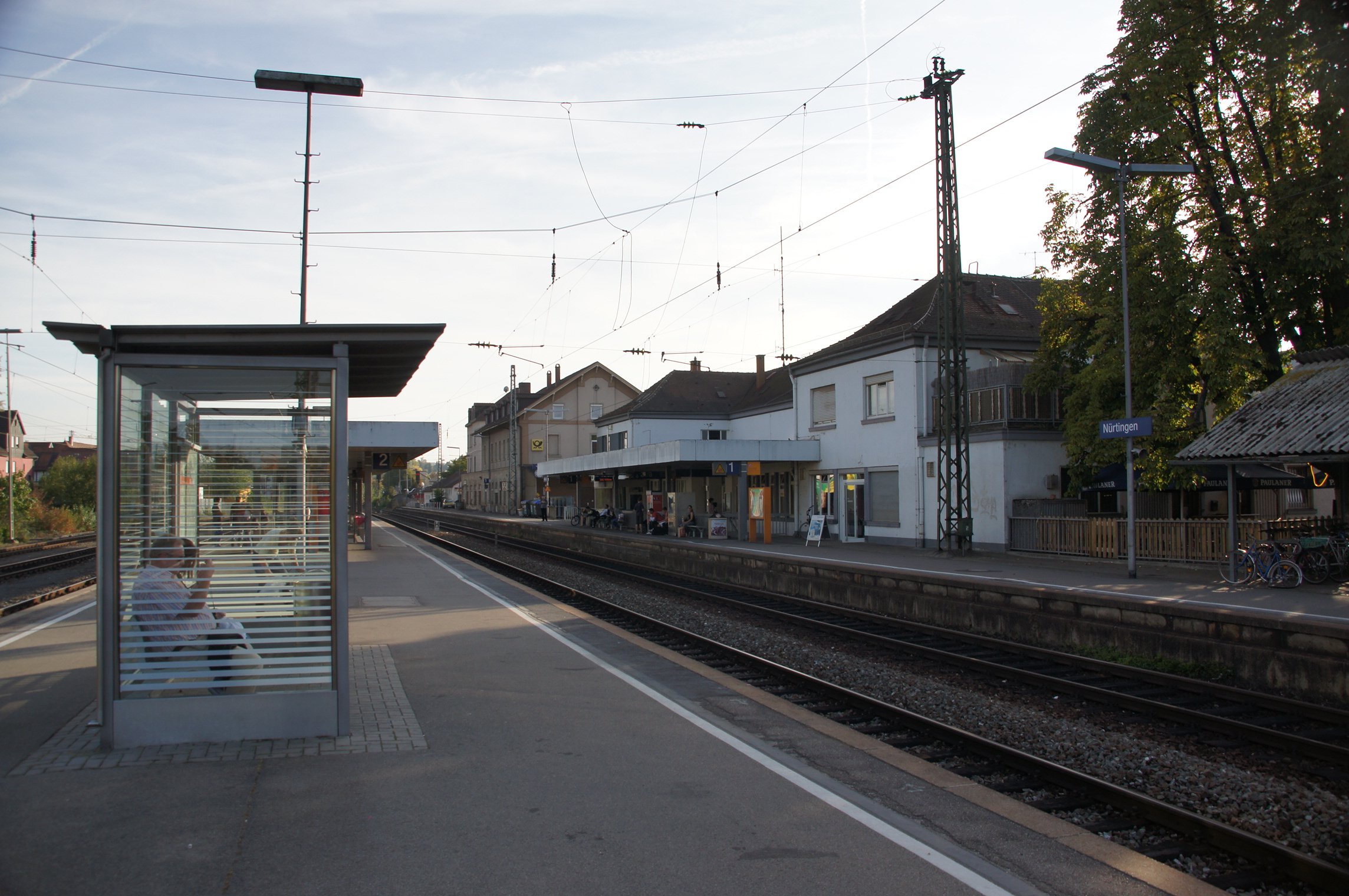
- Nürtingen station

General information
- Location: Bahnhofstr. 8, Nürtingen, Baden-Württemberg; Germany
- Coordinates: 48°37′41″N 9°20′33″E
- Owner: Deutsche Bahn
- Operator: DB Netz; DB Station&Service
- Lines: Plochingen–Immendingen; Nürtingen–Neuffen
- Platforms: 3

Construction
- Accessible: Yes

Other information
- Station code: 4612
- DS100 code: TNU
- IBNR: 8004488
- Category: 3
- Fare zone: : 4 and 5
- Website: www.bahnhof.de

History
- Opened: 20 September 1859

Services
| Preceding station | DB Fernverkehr | Following station |
|---|---|---|
| Metzingen (Württemberg) towards Tübingen Hbf | IC 55 | Stuttgart Hbf towards Dresden Hbf |
| Preceding station | (Stuttgart) | Following station |
| Metzingen (Württemberg) towards Tübingen Hbf | RE 6 | Stuttgart Hbf Terminus |
| Metzingen (Württemberg) towards Tübingen Hbf | MEX 12 | Wendlingen (Neckar) towards Mosbach-Neckarelz |
| Bempflingen towards Tübingen Hbf | MEX 18 | Oberboihingen towards Osterburken |
| Preceding station | Württembergische Eisenbahn-Gesellschaft | Following station |
| Terminus | RB 65 | Nürtingen-Vorstadt towards Neuffen |
Location

Nürtingen station is a railway junction in Nürtingen in the German state of Baden-Württemberg. It is at the junction of the Plochingen–Immendingen railway from Plochingen to Immendingen and the Nürtingen–Neuffen railway (Tälesbahn) to Neuffen. It is served by one pair of InterCity trains, regional trains and trains operated by the Württembergische Eisenbahn-Gesellschaft ("Württemberg Railway Company").

== History ==
=== Opening ===
The Royal Württemberg State Railways (Königlich Württembergischen Staats-Eisenbahnen) opened the first section of Plochingen–Immendingen railway (then called the Obere Neckarbahn, "Upper Neckar Railway") from Plochingen to Reutlingen on 20 September 1859. A station was built at Nürtingen, as it was conveniently located on the Neckar and was the seat of the Oberamt (district) of Nürtingen. The station was built to the east of the town. The former entrance building is still preserved. It housed the post office until 1893, when it was given its own building south of the station building.

=== Nürtingen becomes a railway junction ===
In the late 19th century, the town of Neuffen sought a connection to the railway. This was made possible by a private company. Since 1 June 1900, the Nürtingen–Neuffen railway has branched from the Plochingen–Tübingen railway in Nürtingen to Neuffen. This line is also called the Tälesbahn (“Valley’s Railway”). At the same time, the State Railways was planning a railway line that would branches off in Nürtingen to Kirchentellinsfurt, running on the left (western) bank of the Neckar. However, it rejected this project. The State Railways also opened a section of double track on the Unterboihingen–Neckartailfingen section in 1900.

Nürtingen reported increasing numbers of inhabitants. With new residential and commercial buildings as well as industrial and commercial enterprises, the town grew towards the station.

=== Reichsbahn period ===
As early as 1926 the municipal council and the tourist office declared that the entrance building was too small and out of date. Deutsche Reichsbahn did not share this opinion and refused to fund a new building. The Reichsbahn only agreed when some of Nürtingen's industrial concerns declared their willingness to share in the costs and the Post Office expressed interest in taking over the old building.

The new entrance building was built north of the former building. The official inauguration was held on 19 November 1934. The Reichsbahn completed electrification of the route from Plochingen to Tübingen on 1 October 1934.

== Entrance buildings ==
In Nürtingen both the entrance building of 1859 and the new building of 1934 have survived.

=== Entrance building of 1859 ===
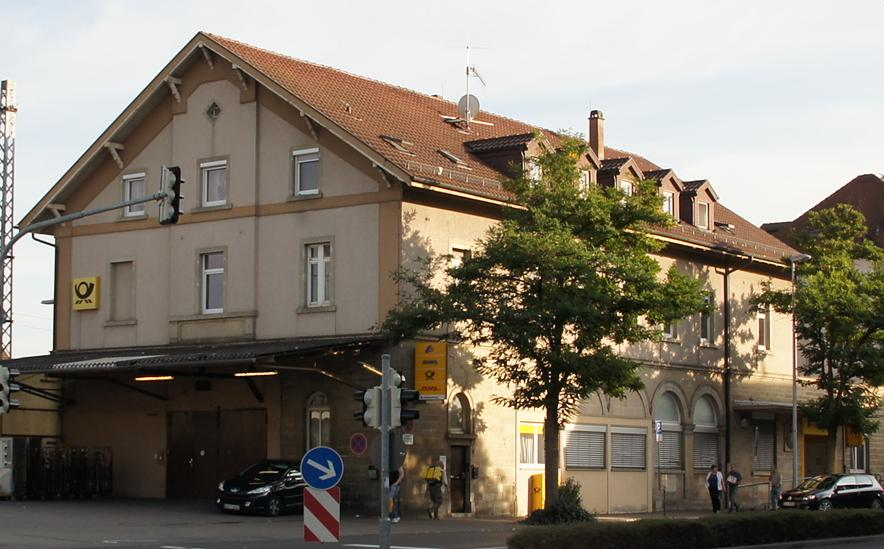
Entrance building of 1859 (2010)

The station building from 1859 is a two-storey building with a gabled roof. Windows and doors on the ground floor were built with Rundbogenstil (Romanesque Revival) arches, which are still visible. It originally had a length of 25.78 metres and a width of 14.32 metres. From the street side passengers reached the platform through a narrow main hall. The building accommodated a waiting room and service rooms for the railway employees, as well as the post office. The building was later given a southward extension. Upstairs apartments were provided for railway staff. In 1893, the post office moved into its own building south of the station building. In 1934, the post office took over the old entrance building from the railways.

=== Entrance building of 1934 ===
The entrance building of 1934 was very representative of its time, but functional. The main part of the building (central building and two two-story wings) initially had a length of 43 metres and a width of 14.5 metres. To the north, extending for a length of about 4.5 metres, there is a staircase that forms a buttress. This is followed by a one-storey annexe. Deutsche Bundesbahn also extended the building to the south with a five-metre-long one-story annex.

The main hall in the central block no longer has its original length due to internal conversions. Originally it was 24 metres long and 7.12 metres wide. The ceiling height is 6.6 metres. The hall is illuminated by the large windows on the street side. The central structure has a one-story extension to the east.

The building is covered with several hip roofs. The one-story part of the central structure has a flat roof.

The Reichsbahn formally inaugurated the building on 19 November 1934.

== Operations ==
The station has three platform tracks. Trains towards Metzingen stop at platform 1 (next to the station building) and trains towards Wendlingen stop at platform 2. The trains operated by WEG towards Neuffen start at platform 3.

Long-distance services
| Line | Route | Frequency |
|---|---|---|
| IC 55 | Dresden – Leipzig – Halle – Magdeburg – Braunschweig – Hanover – Bielefeld – Dortmund – Hagen – Wuppertal – Solingen – Cologne – Bonn – Koblenz – Mainz – Mannheim – Stuttgart – Nürtingen – Tübingen | One train pair |

Regional services
| Line | Route | Frequency |
|---|---|---|
| RE 6 | Stuttgart – Nürtingen – Metzingen – Reutlingen – Tübingen | 120 mins |
| MEX 12 | Tübingen – Reutlingen – Metzingen – Bempflingen – Nürtingen – Oberboihingen – Wendlingen (Neckar) – Plochingen – Esslingen (Neckar) – Stuttgart – Heilbronn Hbf – (Mosbach) | 60 mins, Mosbach only in peak |
| MEX 18 | Tübingen – Reutlingen – Metzingen – Nürtingen – Wendlingen (Neckar) – Plochingen – Esslingen (Neckar) – Stuttgart – Heilbronn – Osterburken | 60 mins |
| RB 65 | Nürtingen – Frickenhausen – Neuffen | 60 mins (30 mins in peak) |

Nürtingen station is classified by Deutsche Bahn as a category 3 station.
