= Sigmaringen station =

Railway station in the town of Sigmaringen

Sigmaringen
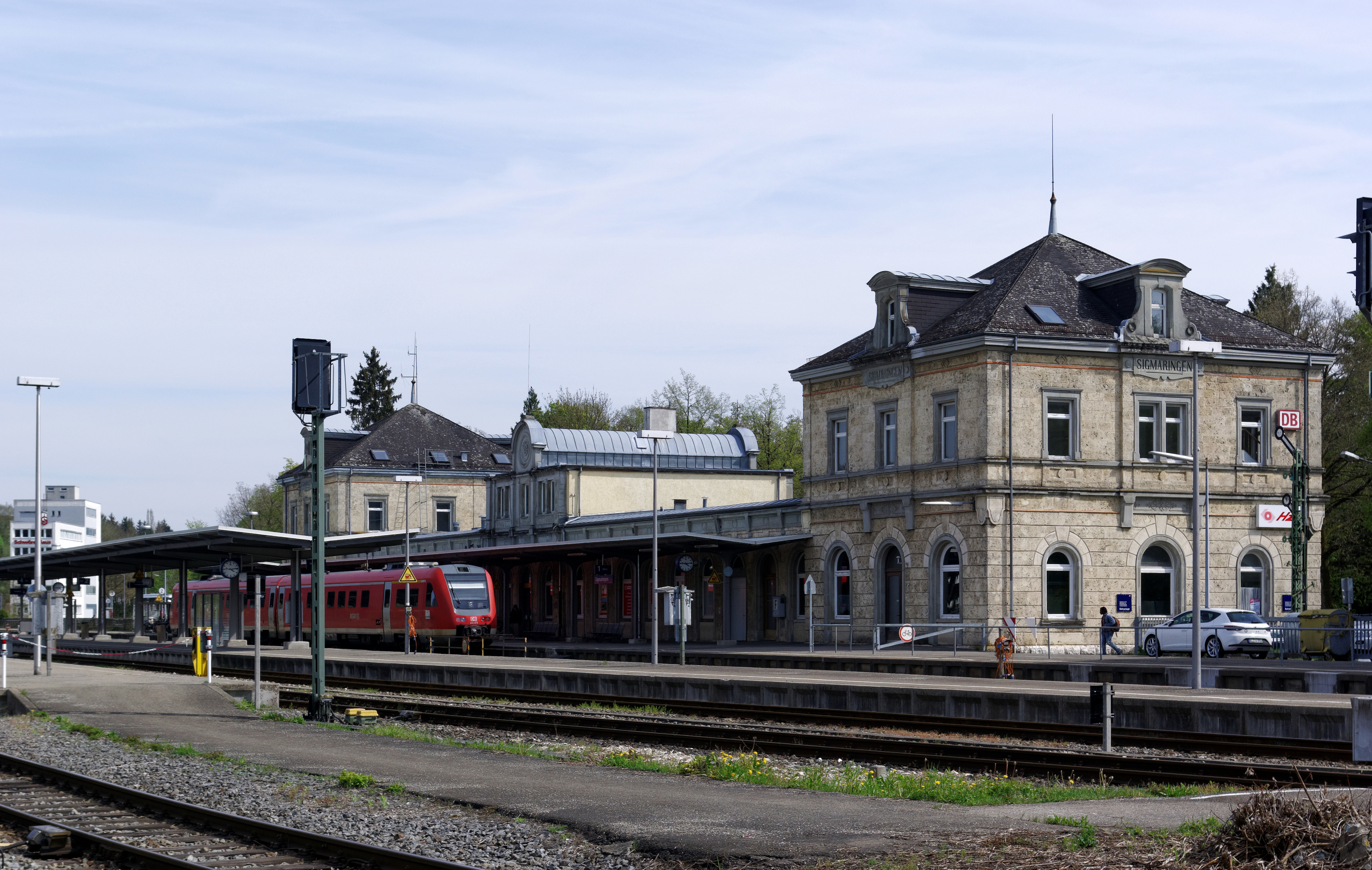

General information
- Location: Bahnhofstraße 7; 72488 Sigmaringen; Baden-Württemberg; Germany
- Coordinates: 48°05′13″N 09°13′20″E
- Elevation: 572 m (1,877 ft)
- System: Bf
- Owner: DB InfraGO
- Operator: DB InfraGO
- Lines: Tübingen–Sigmaringen railway (KBS 766); Ulm–Sigmaringen railway (KBS 755); Engstingen–Sigmaringen railway (KBS 759, 768); Krauchenwies–Sigmaringen railway (until 1971)
- Platforms: 1 side platform and 2 island platforms
- Tracks: 5
- Train operators: DB Regio Baden-Württemberg; SWEG Südwestdeutsche Landesverkehrs-AG
- Connections: Bus interchange

Construction
- Parking: yes
- Cycle facilities: yes
- Accessible: yes
- Architectural style: Renaissance Revival architecture

Other information
- Station code: 5853
- DS100 code: TSIG
- IBNR: 800069
- Category: 5
- Fare zone: naldo: 441
- Website: www.bahnhof.de

History
- Opened: 26 July 1873

Services
Preceding station	DB Regio Baden-Württemberg	Following station
Albstadt-Ebingen towards Stuttgart Hbf	RE 6a	Mengen towards Aulendorf
Storzingen towards Albstadt-Ebingen	RB 53	Sigmaringendorf towards Aulendorf
Hausen im Tal towards Villingen (Schwarzwald)	RE 55	Sigmaringendorf towards Ulm Hbf
Preceding station	(Stuttgart)	Following station
Hausen im Tal towards Immendingen	RB 43a	Terminus
Terminus	RB 59a	Hanfertal towards Engstingen
Storzingen towards Tübingen Hbf	RB 66	Terminus
Hanfertal towards Hechingen	RB 68	Terminus
Location
- Location within Baden-Württemberg Location within Germany Location within Europe

Sigmaringen is a railway station in the town of Sigmaringen, located in the Sigmaringen district in Baden-Württemberg, Germany. The station lies on the Tübingen–Sigmaringen railway, the Ulm–Sigmaringen railway and the Engstingen–Sigmaringen railway. The train services are operated by DB Regio Baden-Württemberg and SWEG Südwestdeutsche Landesverkehrs-AG.

== History ==
The planning of the station building took place in 1870 and the completion of the building took place in 1873.
