= Tübingen Hauptbahnhof =

Largest station in Tübingen and the district of Tübingen

Tübingen Hbf
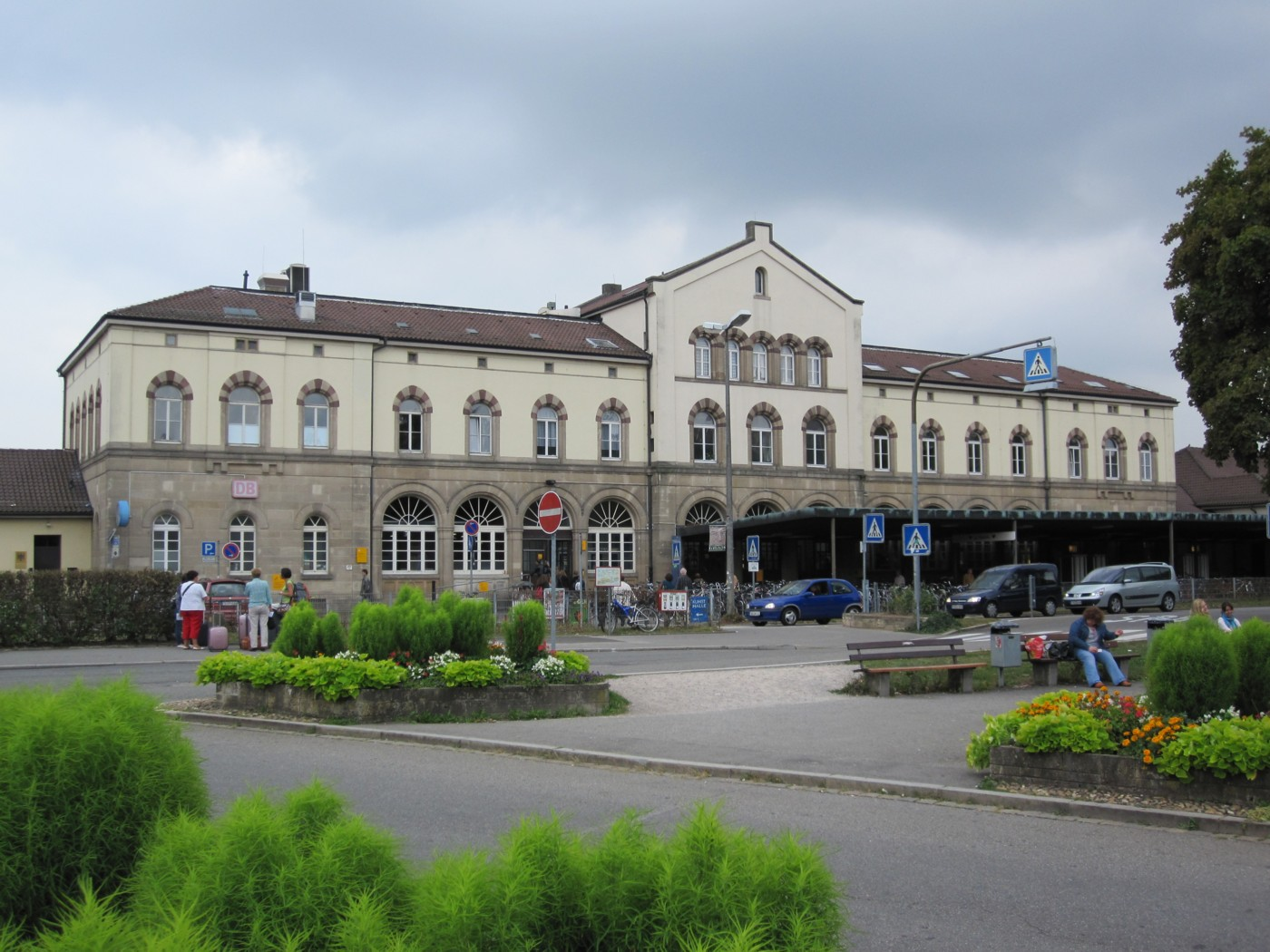

General information
- Location: Tübingen, Baden-Württemberg; Germany
- Coordinates: 48°30′57″N 9°03′21″E
- Owner: Deutsche Bahn
- Operator: DB Netz; DB Station&Service
- Lines: Plochingen–Immendingen railway (KBS 764, 760); Ammer Valley Railway (KBS 764); Tübingen–Sigmaringen railway (KBS 766)
- Platforms: 7 (1–3, 5–6, 12–13)

Construction
- Accessible: Yes
- Architect: Josef Schlierholz
- Architectural style: Rundbogenstil

Other information
- Station code: 6279
- DS100 code: TT
- Category: 2
- Fare zone: naldo: 111
- Website: www.bahnhof.de

History
- Opened: 1862; 164 years ago
- Electrified: 7 October 1934; 92 years ago

Passengers
- 50,000 (2007)
Services
Preceding station	DB Regio Baden-Württemberg	Following station
Reutlingen Hbf towards Stuttgart Hbf	RE 6a	Mössingen towards Aulendorf
Reutlingen Hbf towards Stuttgart Hbf	RE 6b	Kiebingen towards Rottenburg
Tübingen-Lustnau towards Metzingen (Württ) or Bad Urach	RB 63	Tübingen West towards Herrenberg
Kiebingen towards Horb or Pforzheim Hbf	RB 74	Terminus
Preceding station	(Stuttgart)	Following station
Reutlingen Hbf towards Stuttgart Hbf	RE 6	Terminus
Reutlingen Hbf towards Heilbronn or Mosbach-Neckarelz	MEX 12	Terminus
Reutlingen Hbf towards Osterburken	MEX 18	Terminus
Terminus	RB 66	Tübingen-Derendingen towards Sigmaringen
Location

Tübingen Hauptbahnhof is the largest station in the university town of Tübingen and the district of Tübingen, and a transport hub in the German state of Baden-Württemberg.

== Location ==
The station is located south of the centre of the old town on the opposite side of the Neckar. It was originally built in open fields, that are now the southern Tübingen districts of Derendingen and Südstadt. In 1960 a bus station was established in the station forecourt (Europaplatz), which is now used by 34 bus routes daily, connecting the station to the entire city.

== History ==
The line now forming the Plochingen–Immendingen railway, then called the Obere Neckarbahn (Upper Neckar Railway), was opened from Plochingen to Reutlingen in 1859. It was extended to Tübingen and Rottenburg am Neckar in 1861. The line was then further extended in several stages until 1870, when it finally reached Immendingen on the Black Forest Railway, connecting to Lake Constance. This provided the rail link to the capital of the former Kingdom of Württemberg for the then 8,000 residents of Tübingen and about 30,000 residents in the administrative district of Oberamt Tübingen that then included Tübingen. In 1861/1862, the still preserved station building was built to a design by the architect Josef Schlierholz. At the same time an engine depot was established in Tübingen. From 1867 to 1874, the Royal Württemberg State Railways built the Hohenzollern Railway (Hohenzollernbahn or Hohenzollern Railway, later called the Zollernalbbahn or Zollernalb Railway) from Tübingen via Hechingen to Sigmaringen, forming the Tübingen–Sigmaringen railway and making Tübingen into a railway junction. Once the Ammer Valley Railway from Herrenberg was connected to Tübingen on 1 May 1910, the present form of the rail junction was largely achieved. In 1916, an underpass was built to the two island platforms, the entrance building was extended to the west with the construction of the so-called exit hall, the interior of the entrance building was rebuilt and the platforms were covered. Apart from changes of use, in particular the conversion of waiting rooms and storage areas to shops and restaurants, and minor changes, such as the removal of the platform barriers, it is largely unchanged since then.

Air raid shelters were set up in the basement of the entrance building in 1937.

== Current operations ==
=== Layout of the station ===
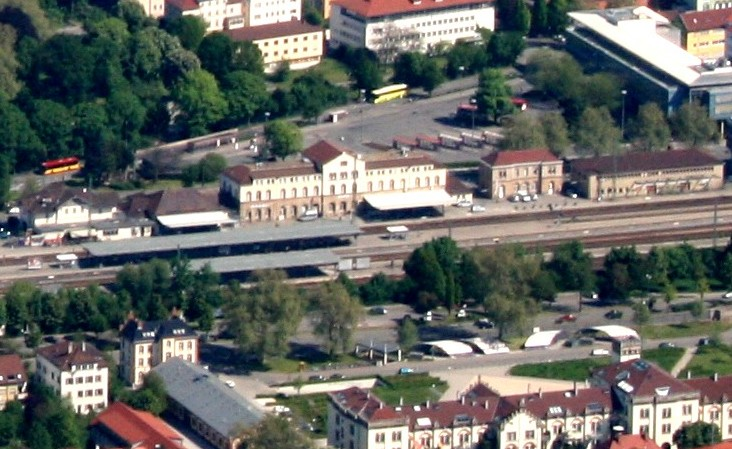
Aerial view of the station in 2008

The Tübingen Hauptbahnhof now has eight running lines, five of which are equipped with platforms: track 1 is the main platform track, the two island platforms are bordered by tracks 2/3 and 5/6. On the island platforms there are also the bay platforms 9–12, of which only 12 is used for passenger operations. At the western end of the main platform there is another bay platform, track 13, which is used for passenger traffic. To the north of this, a platform will be built on the existing dead-end track 14, which has been needed for the intensified service on line RB 63 since December 2022. To the west are the depot and the Ammertalbahn, the Tübingen–Sigmaringen railway line and the line towards Immendingen. To the east is the former freight yard on the line towards Plochingen. Today, only a few sidings remain there; the remaining area was developed into a new urban district between 2015 and 2019.

All tracks have LCD destination displays for passenger information. There is also a Deutsche Bahn service point and a travel centre. Two restaurants and various shops are available for visitors. The station also has a federal police station and a contact point of the Bahnhofsmission (a charity).

The platforms have been barrier-free accessible since September 2011. This development was planned as part of the station modernisation programme of DB Station&Service for Baden-Württemberg, and work began in spring 2010. The platform for tracks 1 and 13 as well as the platform for tracks 2, 3 and 12 were each connected by a lift, and the platform for tracks 5 and 6 by a ramp. The low height of the platforms remained unchanged, however, so that step-free boarding of trains is only possible on track 13. This platform was the only one to be raised to a height of 55 cm (22 in) along its entire length when the modernised Ammer Valley Railway was reopened in 1999. The raising of the other platforms to 55 cm is still part of the station modernisation program, but no concrete plans and timescales exist yet.

The renovation of the station is considered a high priority by Deutsche Bahn. The concept was developed by the construction administration with Deutsche Bahn and in close consultation with the historic preservation authorities. The interior, with its public areas, shops and office units, the platforms, the energy efficiency of the building envelope, and the technical systems are also to be improved. The state and the railway are currently coordinating the station renovation program for the next ten years, starting in 2019.

Entrance to the underground bicycle parking facility, 2024

=== Surrounding area and ZOB ===
For decades, the area just outside the northern exit of the train station building was bordered by the bus terminal at Europaplatz and the so-called "Anlagenpark" (a public park).

In 2019, construction began on a new central bus station (ZOB), extensive cycling infrastructure, an underground parking garage, and the redesign of the Anlagenpark. This project, led by the city of Tübingen, was largely completed in 2023 at a total cost of approximately 65 million euros.

=== Services ===
The station was served by the following regional services in 2026:

Line	Route		Frequency	Operator
RE 6a	Aulendorf – Herbertingen – Sigmaringen – Albstadt-Ebingen – Balingen – Hechingen –	Tübingen (train split/joined) – Reutlingen – Stuttgart	Every two hours	DB Regio Baden-Württemberg
RE 6b	Rottenburg –	Tübingen (train split/joined) – Reutlingen – Stuttgart	Every two hours	DB Regio Baden-Württemberg
RE 6	Tübingen – Reutlingen – Metzingen – Stuttgart		Every two hours	SWEG Bahn Stuttgart
MEX 12	Tübingen – Reutlingen – Metzingen – Bempflingen – Nürtingen – Oberboihingen – Wendlingen – Plochingen – Esslingen	– Stuttgart – Heilbronn – (Mosbach-Neckarelz)	Hourly	SWEG Bahn Stuttgart
MEX 12	Tübingen – Reutlingen – Metzingen – Bempflingen – Nürtingen – Oberboihingen – Wendlingen – Plochingen – Esslingen	– Stuttgart	Additional peak hour services	SWEG Bahn Stuttgart
MEX 18	Tübingen – Reutlingen – Metzingen – Nürtingen – Wendlingen – Plochingen – Esslingen – Stuttgart – Heilbronn – Osterburken		Hourly	SWEG Bahn Stuttgart
The MEX 12 and MEX 18 lines offer services between Tübingen and Heilbronn almost every half hour
RB 63	Herrenberg – Tübingen – Reutlingen – Metzingen (– Bad Urach)		Herrenberg–Metzingen: every 30 minutes; Metzingen–Bad Urach: hourly	DB Regio Baden-Württemberg
RB 66	Tübingen – Dußlingen – Nehren – Mössingen – Bodelshausen – Hechingen – Bisingen – Balingen – Albstadt-Ebingen (– Sigmaringen)		60 minutes (to Albstadt), 120 minutes (to Sigmaringen)	SWEG Südwestdeutsche Landesverkehrs-AG
Additional RB 66 trains Mon–Fri during rush hour between Tübingen and Hechingen
RB 74	Tübingen – Rottenburg – Horb (– Nagold – Calw – Pforzheim)		60 minutes (to Horb or Pforzheim with a change in Horb), 120 minutes (without change to Pforzheim)	DB Regio Baden-Württemberg

== Prospects ==
After the planned completion of the Stuttgart 21 project, it is planned to operate four trains per hour each way between Stuttgart and Tübingen from December 2025. Two pairs of trains per hour will stop in Nürtingen and Stuttgart Flughafen/Messe station, running via the proposed Little Wendlingen Curve and a section of the new Wendlingen–Ulm high-speed line. Two pairs of trains an hour will run via Plochingen. Diesel powered tilting trains will no longer run on the line, because they will be banned in the new Stuttgart Hauptbahnhof.

Services will operate via Stuttgart to Heilbronn, Mannheim, Aalen and Karlsruhe providing connections without requiring changes of trains.

The renovation of the Tübingen train station is considered by the Deutsche Bahn as a priority and will be carried out within the scope of the Europaplatz project. The administration developed the concept with DB and in close coordination with the preservation of historical monuments.

== See also ==
- Rail transport in Germany
- Railway stations in Germany
