= Plochingen–Immendingen railway =

Railway line in Baden-Württemberg, Germany

Plochingen–Immendingen

Overview
- Line number: 4600
- Locale: Baden-Württemberg, Germany

Service
- Route number: 740 (Stuttgart–Singen (Hohentwiel)/Freudenstadt); 743 (Rottweil/Sigmaringen–Blumberg-Zollhaus); 755 (Ulm–Donaueschingen); 760 (Stuttgart–Tübingen); 774 (Tübingen–Pforzheim); 790.1 (Herrenberg–Kirchheim (Teck))

Technical
- Line length: 161.5 km (100.4 mi)
- Track gauge: 1,435 mm (4 ft 8 1/2 in) standard gauge
- Minimum radius: 222 m (728 ft)
- Electrification: 15 kV 16.7 Hz AC

The Plochingen–Immendingen railway is a main-line railway line in the German state of Baden-Württemberg. It runs from Plochingen via Horb am Neckar to Immendingen, following the upper reaches of the Neckar from Plochingen to Neckartailfingen and from Kirchentellinsfurt to Rottweil, and finally the Danube from Tuttlingen to the end of the line. It was therefore also historically known as the Obere Neckarbahn (Upper Neckar Railway) or the Obere Neckartalbahn (Upper Neckar Valley Railway). The Rottweil-Immendingen section used to be called the Obere Donaubahn (Upper Danube Railway) or Obere Donautalbahn (Upper Danube Valley Railway).

The Plochingen–Tübingen section is now sometimes known as the Neckar-Alb-Bahn (Neckar-Alb Railway), the Tübingen–Horb section as the Kulturbahn (Culture Railway), the Horb–Tuttlingen section as part of the Gäubahn (Gäu Railway) and the Tuttlingen–Immendingen section as the Donaubahn (Danube Railway).

== History ==
Plochingen was connected to the network of the Royal Württemberg State Railways (Königlich Württembergische Staats-Eisenbahnen) in 1846 with the building of the Fils Valley Railway (Filstalbahn). The Upper Neckar Railway was extended from there to the south as follows:

20 September 1859:	Plochingen – Reutlingen	Licensed on 6 May 1857
15 October 1861:	Reutlingen – Rottenburg am Neckar	Licensed on 17 November 1858
1 November 1864:	Rottenburg am Neckar – Eyach	Licensed on 17 November 1858
1 December 1866:	Eyach – Horb	Licensed on 17 November 1858
8 October 1867:	Horb – Talhausen	Licensed on 17 November 1858
23 July 1868:	Talhausen – Rottweil	Licensed on 17 November 1858
15 July 1869:	Rottweil – Tuttlingen	Licensed on 13 August 1865
26 July 1870:	Tuttlingen – Immendingen	Licensed on 13 August 1865

When it was being built, the line between Tuttlingen and Möhringen an der Donau, which was initially single-track, crossed the border from Württemberg to Baden and also passed through the Province of Hohenzollern near Dettingen. Württemberg therefore concluded a treaty with Prussia on 13 March 1865 and with the Grand Duchy of Baden on 18 February 1865, but built and operated the entire length of the line itself. At the border station of Immendingen at the time, there was a connection to the Black Forest Railway that had opened two years earlier.

With the completion of the Stuttgart–Horb railway, the so-called Gäubahn, in 1879, the Plochingen–Horb section lost some of its importance because the direct connection from Stuttgart to the south ran through the Korngäu from then on. In contrast, the Horb–Immendingen section became increasingly important and, from 1900, had international express train services to Switzerland and, in later years, also to Italy.

On 28 October 1899, the second track went into operation between Plochingen and Wendlingen (Neckar). From 1900 this extended to Neckartailfingen, from 1 October 1901 to Metzingen (Württ) and from October 1902 to Reutlingen. Later it was extended to Tübingen. The Plochingen–Tübingen section was electrified by 1 October 1934 for Stuttgart suburban traffic.

On 23 and 24 October 1927, the state of Württemberg and Deutsche Reichsbahn signed a contract for the duplication of the Horb–Tuttlingen section. The state granted the national railway a loan of 35 million Reichsmarks (equivalent to €145m). Work on this began as early as 1928, but it was not until 1941 that the work was largely complete, apart from a 2.3-kilometre section between Aistaig and Oberndorf am Neckar. This last section followed in 1943. A simplification of operations had been enabled by the commissioning of the Tuttlingen–Hattingen railway in 1933. It removed the need for trains to and from Singen to detour via Immendingen and reverse there. In the course of the upgrade at that time, Deutsche Reichsbahn also greatly expanded Horb and Rottweil stations and replaced Tuttlingen station with a large new building.

During the Second World War, the Mauser works in Oberndorf am Neckar, an important pillar of German arms production, was an important business on the line. During the war, the line was largely spared from major destruction until February 1945. In 1944/45, Allied aerial bombing caused serious damage to the stations in Horb, Rottweil, Spaichingen and Tuttlingen, but these did not interrupt traffic permanently. It was not until February 1945 that Allied bomber formations destroyed a bridge during an attack on Oberndorf, disrupting rail traffic.

After the war, France, unlike the United States, exercised its right to reparations on a large scale and in 1946 dismantled the second track between Horb and Tuttlingen that had been laid only a few years earlier. On 25 September 1977, the Horb–Tuttlingen section was electrified. At the same time, Deutsche Bundesbahn abandoned services at numerous stations on this section in order to increase travel speeds in local traffic through so-called "express train driving". During the electrification, the iron girder bridge on the disused Balingen–Rottweil line had to be removed to make room for the catenary. Also due to the restricted loading gauge, the remaining track in the five tunnels of this section has been running in the middle since then, which makes it difficult to restore double track.

The former stations at Bempflingen, Betzingen and Kirchentellinsfurt were downgraded halts in the second half of the 20th century. In addition, practically all sidings between Plochingen and Tübingen, many sidings and freight yards were abandoned and mostly separated from the main-line track during conversions.

In the course of the introduction of the Ringzug ("ring train"), which serves the route between Rottweil and Immendingen, in 2003, DB Station&Service reactivated several abandoned stations and built more new ones. From June to November 2008, the district of Rottweil examined expanding Ringzug operations to the Rottweil–Horb section. In return, however, the Regional-Express stops in Sulz am Neckar and Oberndorf am Neckar would have been eliminated. However, this model ultimately failed due to resistance from the affected towns of Oberndorf and Sulz.

Oberndorf station was modernised in 2014 and 2015 at a cost of €2.9m.

Between 6 June and 22 November 2016, 28 kilometres of track and 44 sets of points were renewed between Plochingen and Tübingen for €27m. The section between Reutlingen and Tübingen was completely closed due to construction work between 12 November and 3 December 2021.

== Passenger operations ==
Only the section between Horb and Tuttlingen is used by long-distance rail passenger services apart from a few IC train pairs on the Stuttgart–Tübingen section. There are hourly intercity trains on Intercity line 87, which can also be used by passengers with local rail passenger transport tickets. The following lines operate in local transport:

Line	Operator	Whole route	Section on route 4600	Frequency
IRE 6a	SWEG Bahn Stuttgart (trains ending in Tübingen) / DB Regio Baden-Württemberg (trains running to Aulendorf)	Stuttgart Hbf – Reutlingen – Tübingen – Sigmaringen – Aulendorf	Plochingen (non stop) – Tübingen Hbf	Every two hours (between Stuttgart and Tübingen coupled with IRE 6b), supplemented by every two hours by IRE 6a Stuttgart – Reutlingen – Tübingen with more intermediate stops
IRE 6b	DB Regio Baden-Württemberg	Stuttgart Hbf – Reutlingen – Tübingen – Rottenburg am Neckar (– Horb)	Plochingen (non stop) – Rottenburg am Neckar (– Horb)	Every two hours (Stuttgart and Tübingen coupled with IRE 6a)
RE 4	DB Regio	Stuttgart Hbf – Konstanz	Horb – Tuttlingen	Some trains (seasonal)
MEX 12	SWEG Bahn Stuttgart	Heilbronn Hbf – Tübingen Hbf	Plochingen – Tübingen Hbf	Hourly
RE 14a	DB Regio Baden-Württemberg	Stuttgart Hbf – Rottweil	Horb – Rottweil	Every two hours
RE 55	DB Regio Baden-Württemberg	Ulm Hbf – Villingen (Schwarzwald)	Tuttlingen – Immendingen	Hourly (Ulm – Donaueschingen), two hourly (continuing to Villingen)
MEX 18	SWEG Bahn Stuttgart	Osterburken – Tübingen Hbf	Plochingen – Tübingen Hbf	Hourly
RB 43	Hohenzollerische Landesbahn	Rottweil – Blumberg-Zollhaus	Rottweil – Immendingen	
RB 43a	Hohenzollerische Landesbahn	Sigmaringen – Immendingen	Tuttlingen – Immendingen	
RB 63	DB Regio Baden-Württemberg	Bad Urach – Herrenberg	Metzingen (Württ) – Tübingen Hbf	(at least) hourly
RB 74	DB Regio Baden-Württemberg	Tübingen Hbf – Pforzheim Hbf	Tübingen Hbf – Horb	Hourly (split in Horb), two hourly (coupled Tübingen – Pforzheim)
S 1	DB Regio S-Bahn Stuttgart	Herrenberg – Kirchheim (Teck)	Plochingen – Wendlingen (Neckar)	(at least) every half hour

With the timetable change in June 2020, Abellio Rail Baden-Württemberg took over the electrically-operated services between Plochingen and Tübingen. The procured electric railcars were not available at the beginning, instead rented railcars were used. Especially in the first few weeks after the start of operations, a lack of rolling stock and technical problems led to numerous train cancellations.

In regional transport, between Plochingen and Bempflingen the tariff of the Verkehrs- und Tarifverbund Stuttgart (VVS), applies, from Bempflingen to Eyach that of the Verkehrsverbund Neckar-Alb-Donau (naldo), from Eyach to Horb that of the Verkehrs-Gemeinschaft Landkreis Freudenstadt (VGF), from Horb to Immendingen that of the Zweckverband Verkehrsverbund Schwarzwald-Baar-Heuberg (VVR).

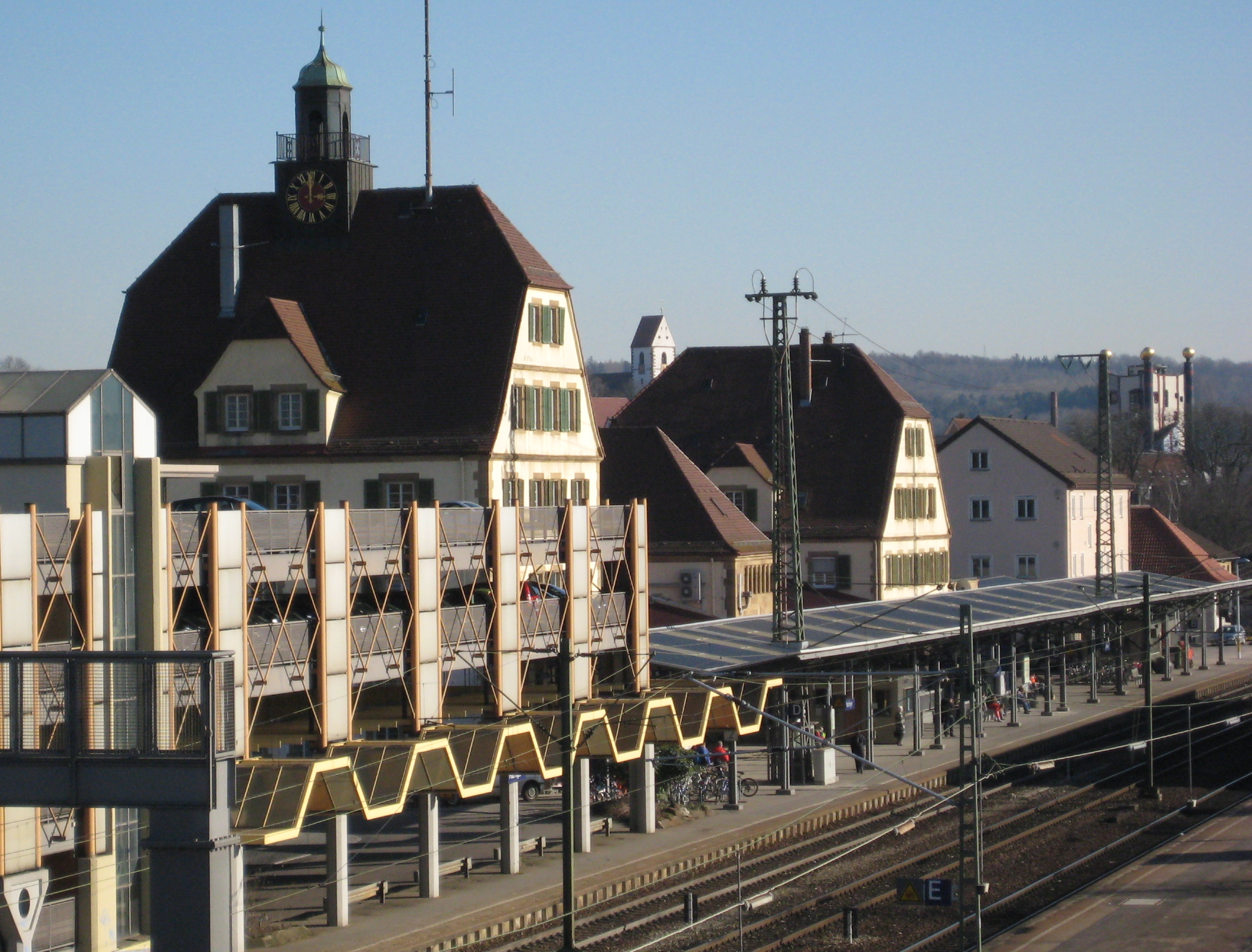
Plochingen station

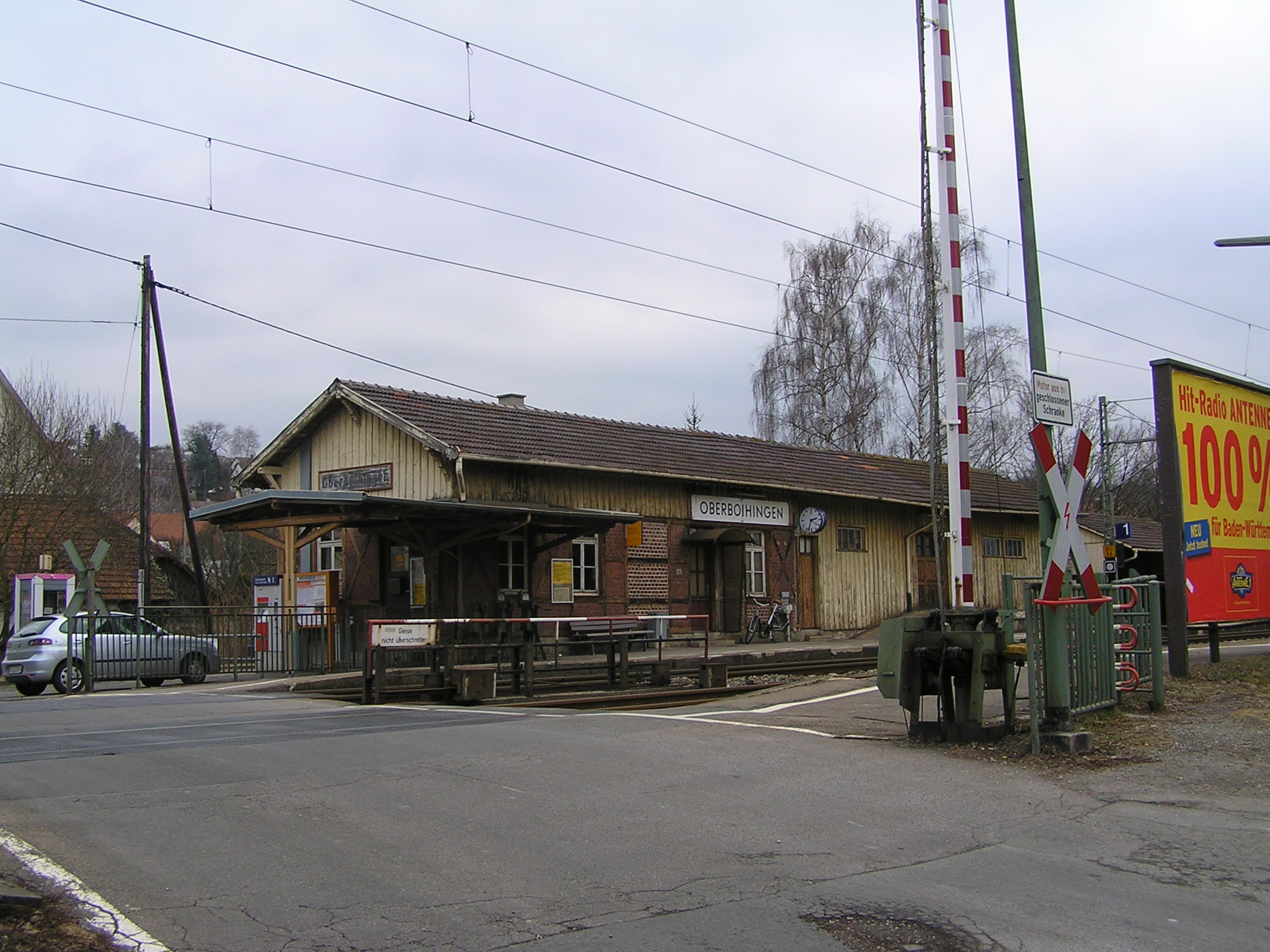
Oberboihingen halt, which has now been redeveloped, in 2009

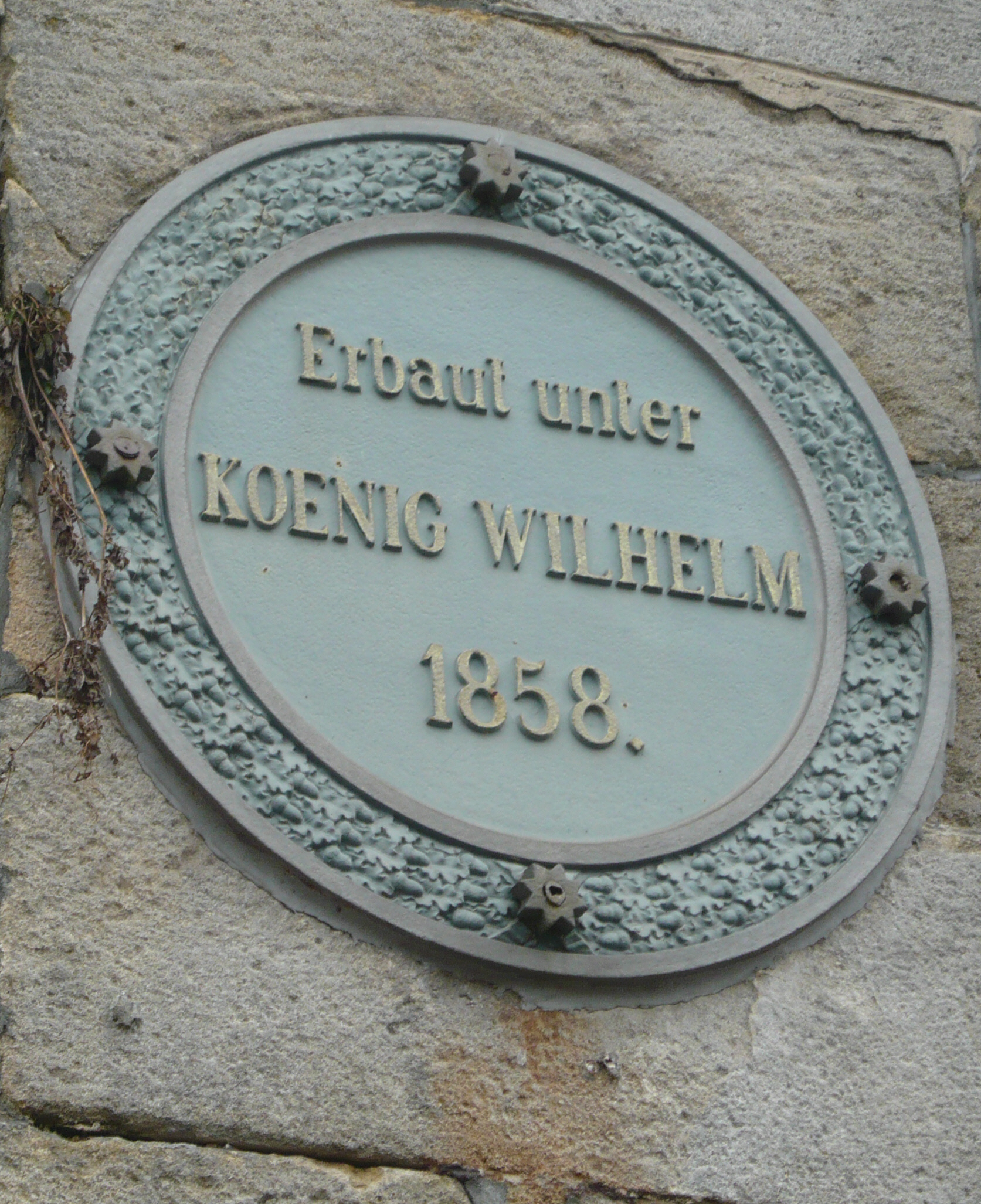
Sign on the bridge over the Steinach in Nürtingen

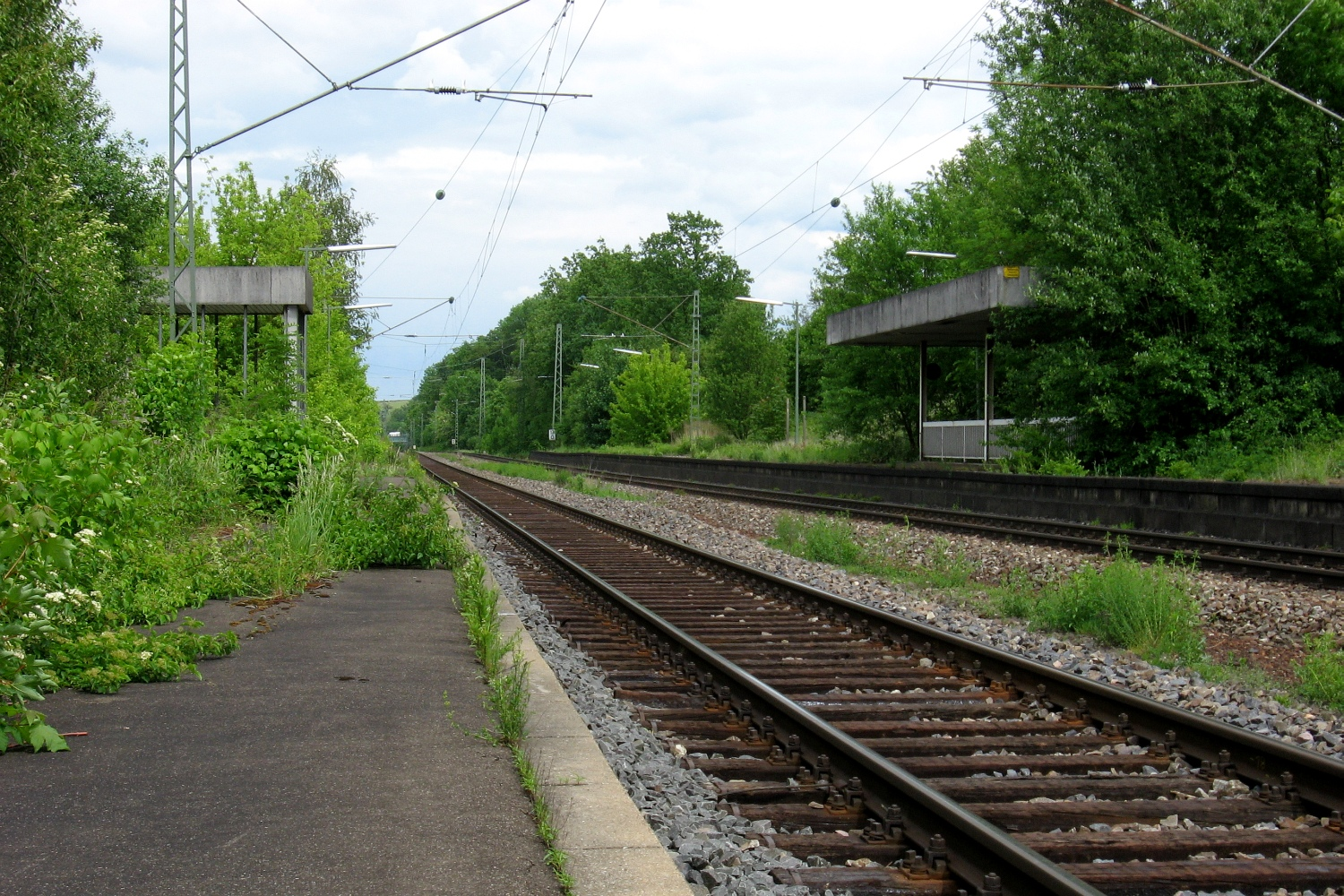
Former halt of Neckartailfingen

=== Freight operations ===
Starting in Plochingen, regular freight traffic now operates from and to Wendlingen am Neckar (from there on to Oberlenningen), to and from Nürtingen (from there on to Neuffen) and to and from Metzingen (from there on via the Ermstalbahn to Dettingen an der Erms).

The town of Reutlingen has secured the site of the former goods yard in order to have a site ready for the construction of a container yard in the long term. The site of the former Tübingen freight yard was largely cleared in 2015 and the tracks were removed, and the freed-up areas were subsequently developed.

On one to two working days a week, the route is served in the mornings by a Hohenzollerische Landesbahn train running from the Tübingen freight yard to Eyach in order to carry scrap and timber towards Mengen. In Eyach, the train changes to the Eyach–Hechingen railway. There is no regular freight traffic between Eyach and Horb. All sidings on the line have been closed and some have been built over. For example, Rottenburg goods yard disappeared years ago in favour of a new bus station.

Hohenzollerische Landesbahn also runs cement trains from Dotternhausen to Switzerland via Tuttlingen.

After the track was lowered at the Rastatt tunnel in mid-August 2017, the route was temporarily used around the clock on weekdays. About 35 freight trains ran on the line every day.

=== Operational issues ===
Due to the topography and the lack of a second track between Horb and Tuttlingen, the trains on this section are still comparatively slow today. In addition to intercity, regional express and freight traffic, since 2003 the line has also had to accommodate Ringzug traffic between Rottweil and Immendingen, so that there are a particularly large number of train crossings. The line is also in competition with the modern Autobahn 81.

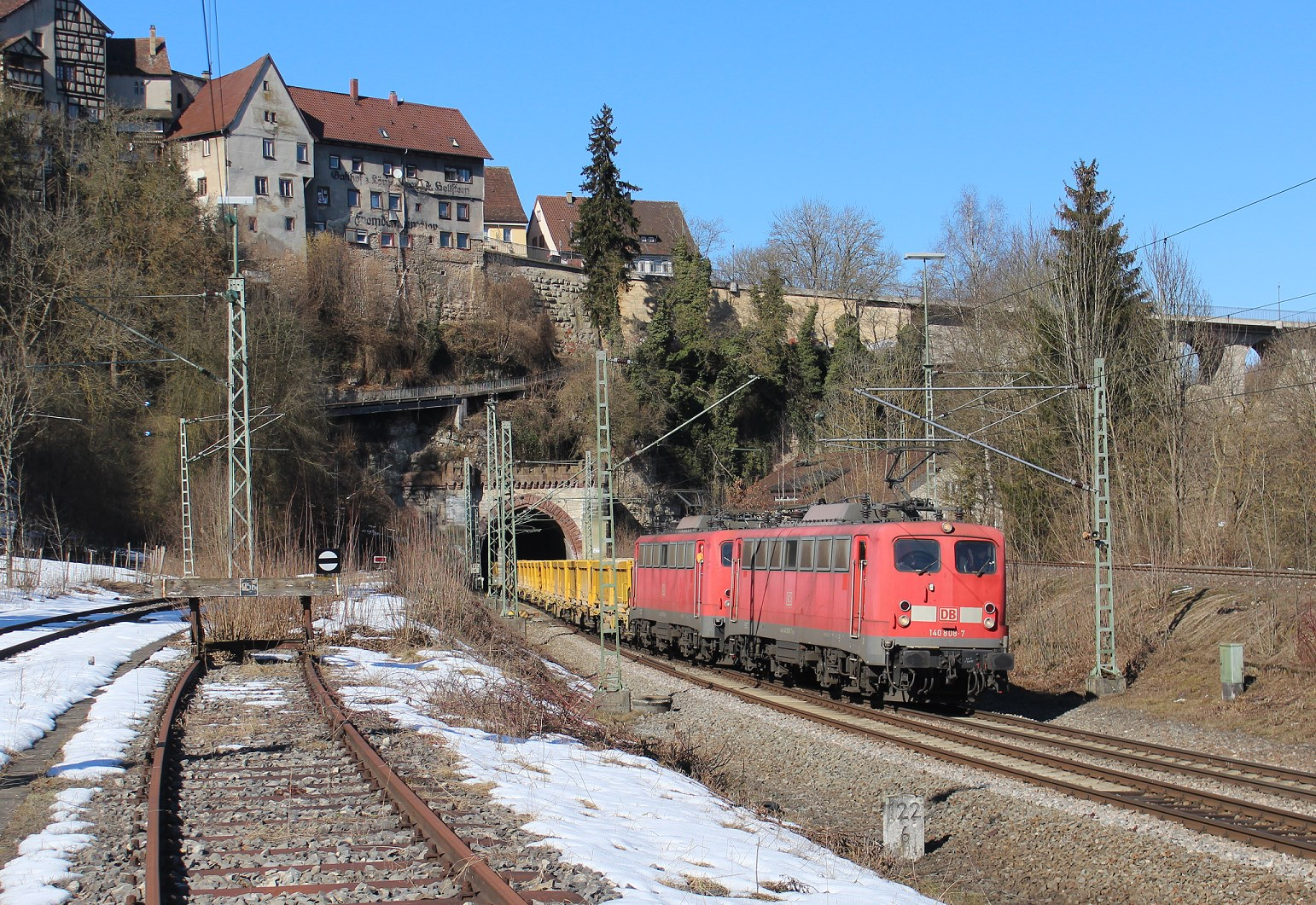
A Stuttgart 21 excavation train hauled two class 140 locomotives leaves the Au Tunnel in Rottweil

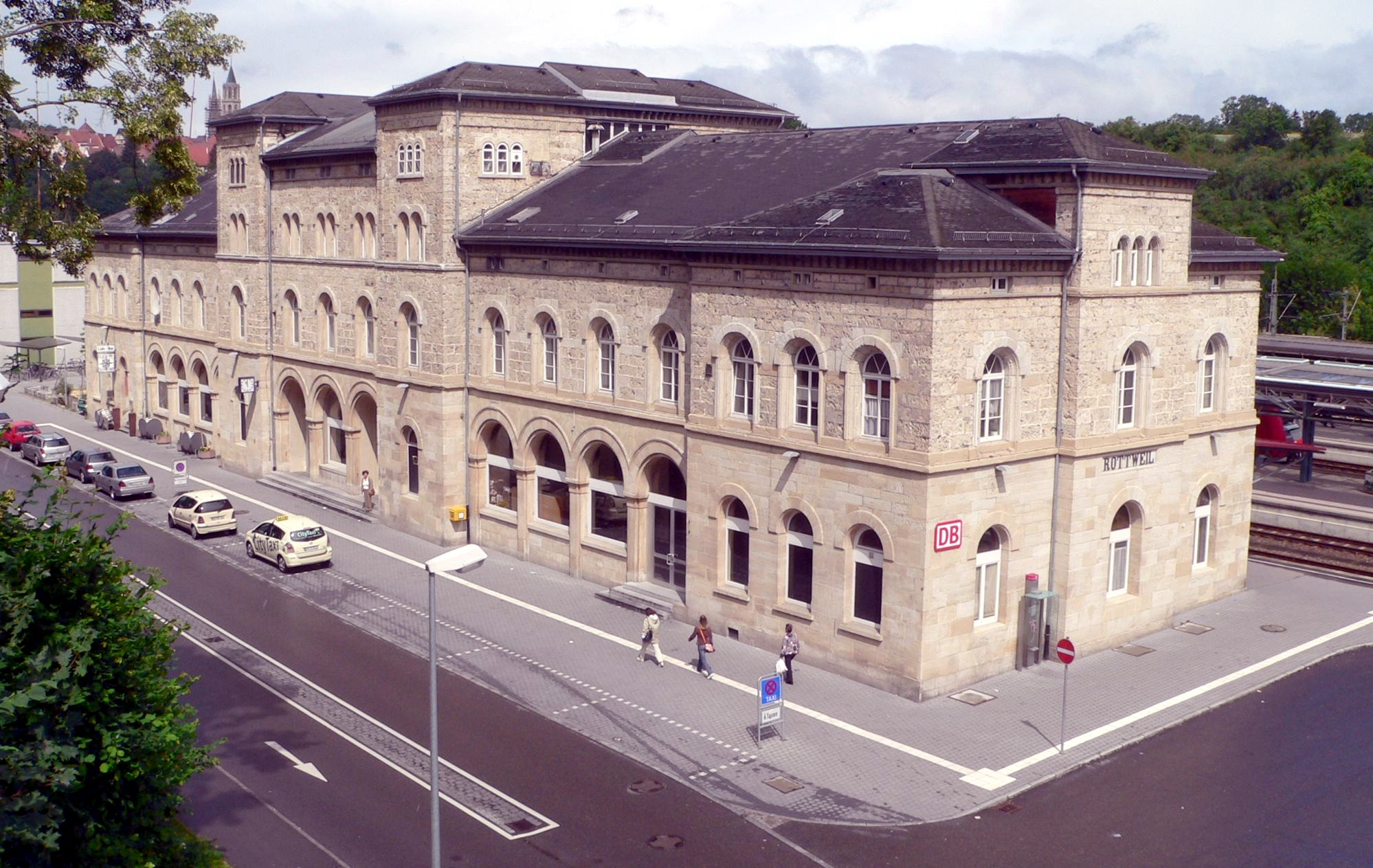
Rottweil station, currently on a single-track section, is to be the start of a double-track section to Spaichingen

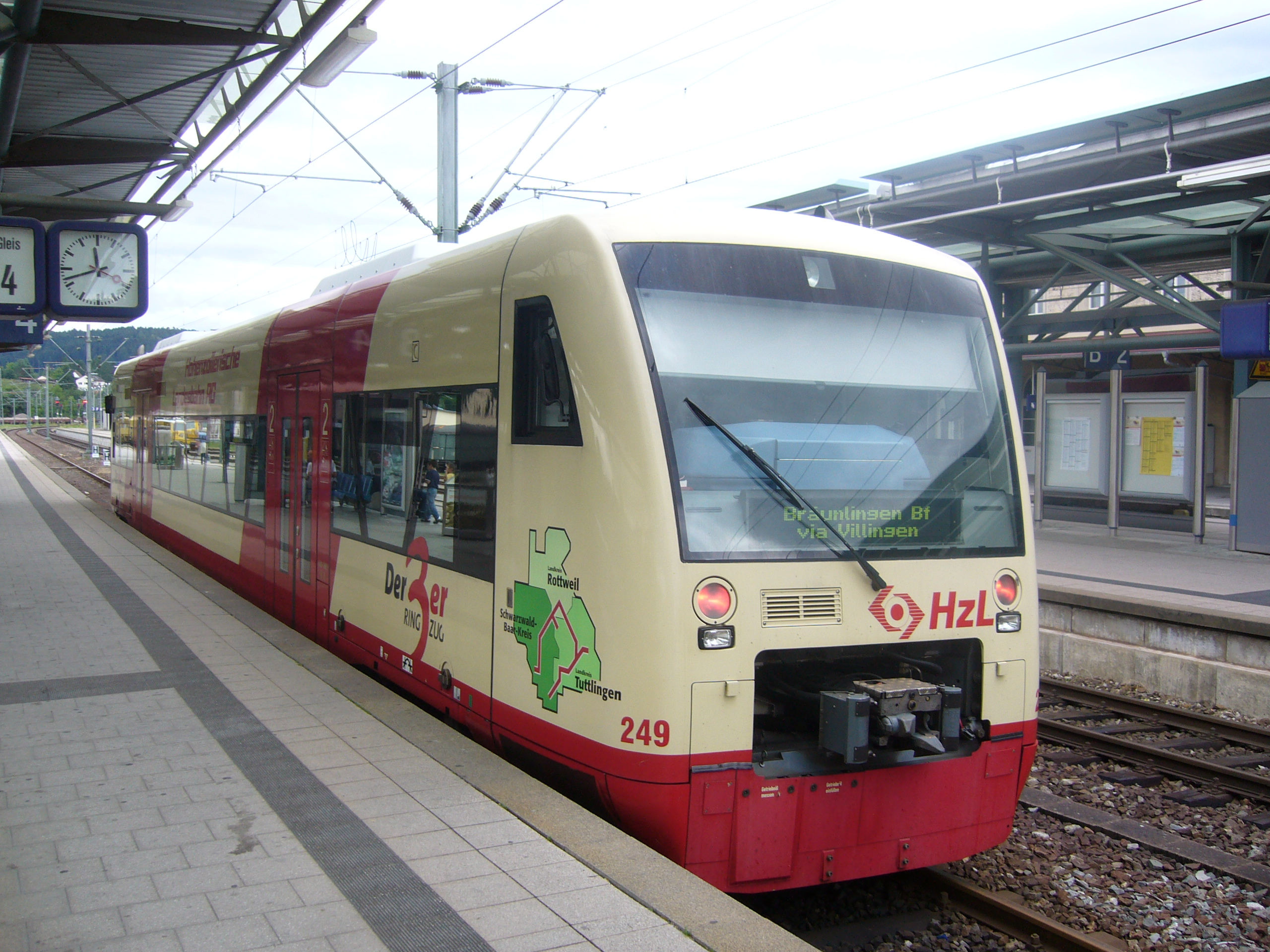
Regio-Shuttle of the Ringzug in Rottweil station

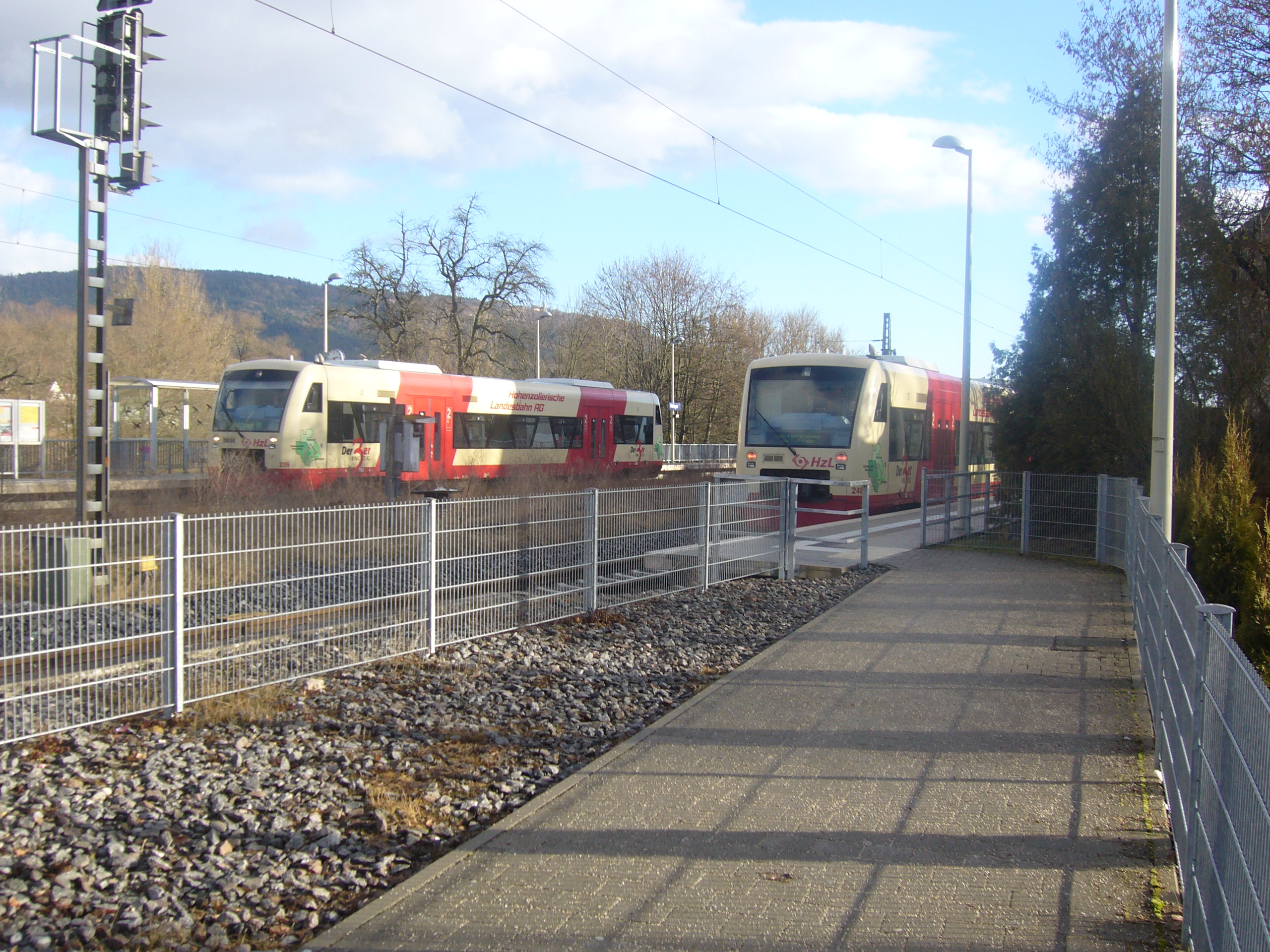
Crossing of two Ringzüge trains in Aldingen station

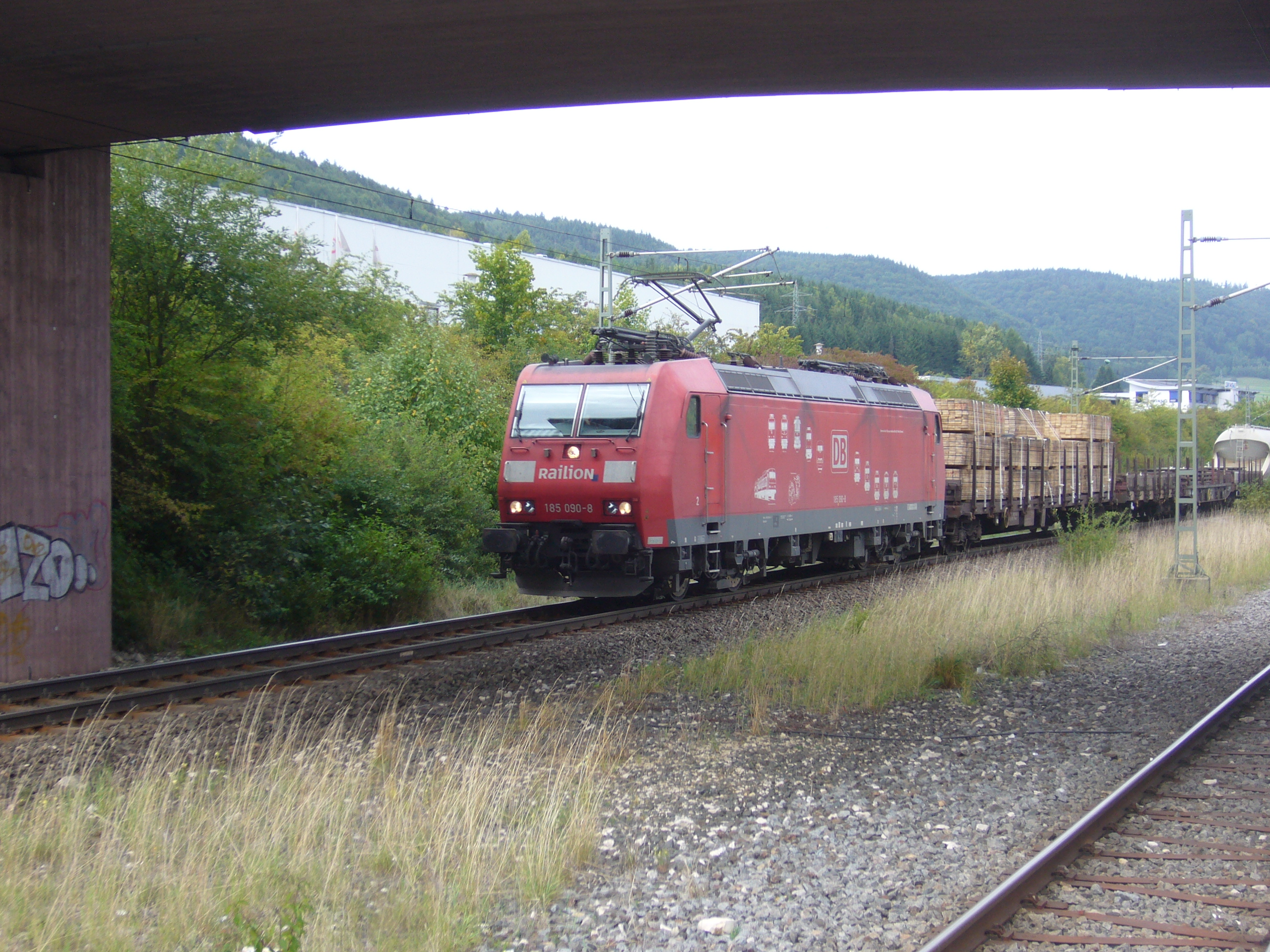
A freight train hauled by an Traxx (class 185) locomotive passes through Wurmlingen Nord station

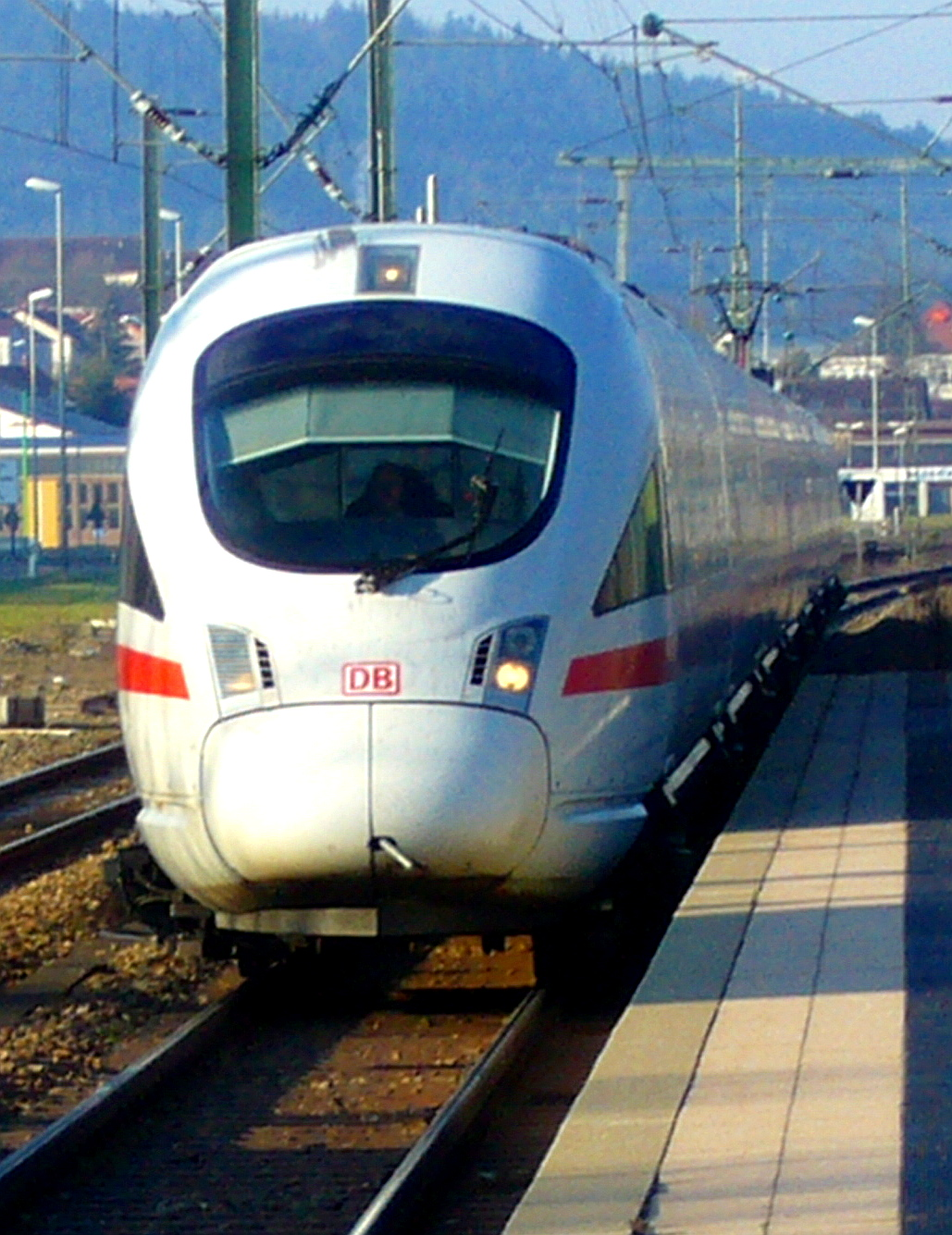
ICE T in Tuttlingen station

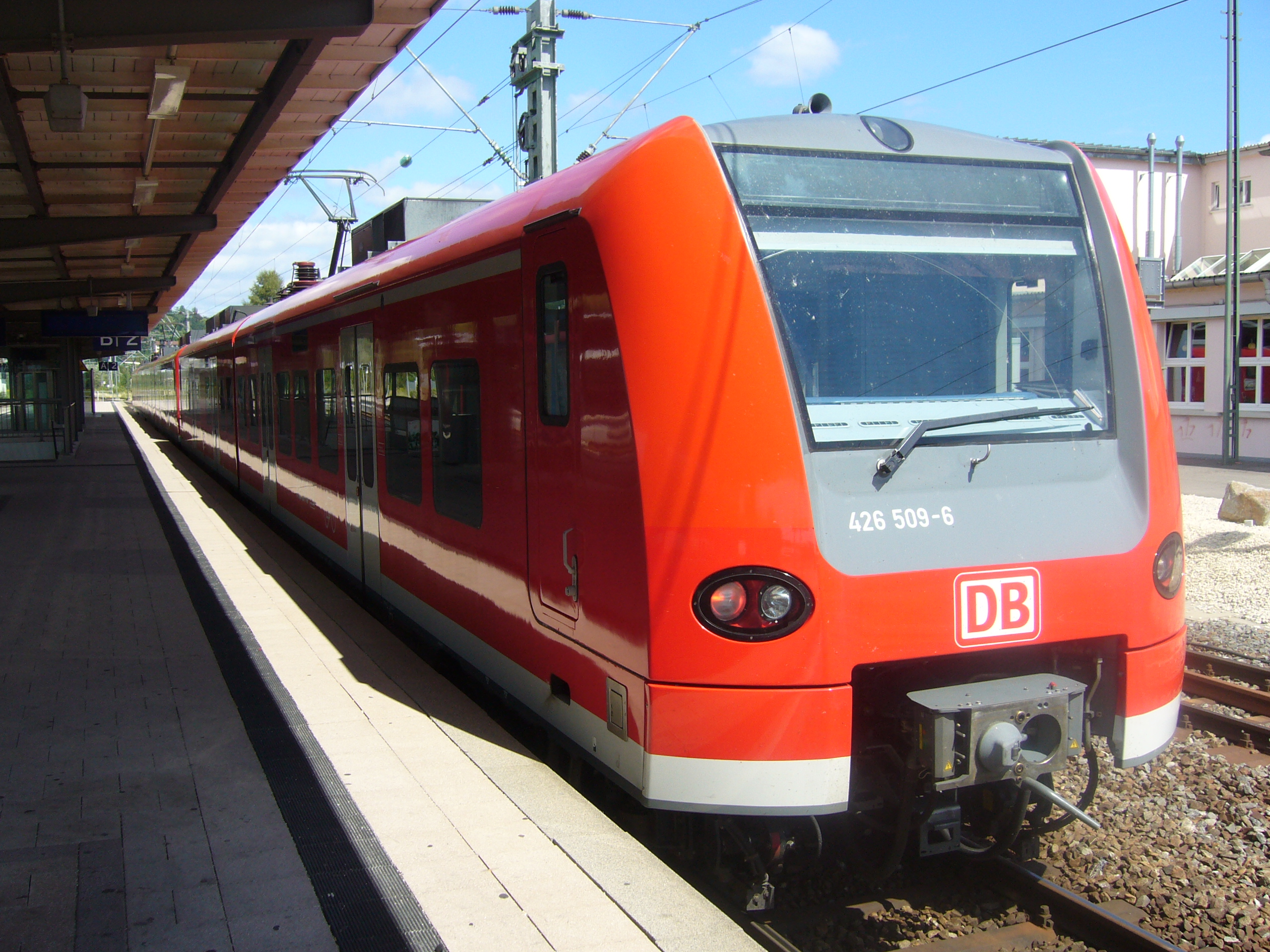
EMUs of 425 and 426 in Tuttlingen station

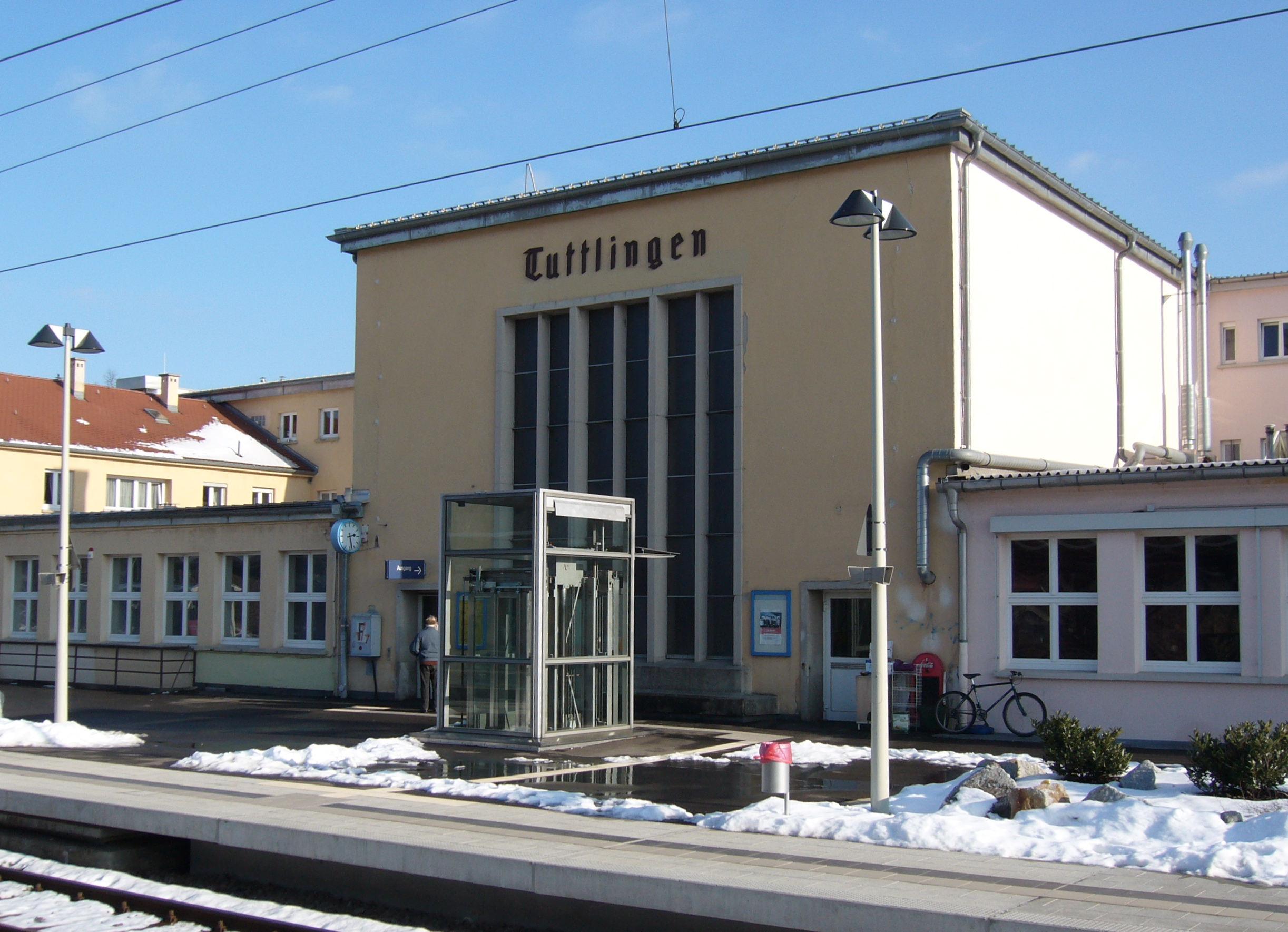
The new Tuttlingen entrance building from 1933

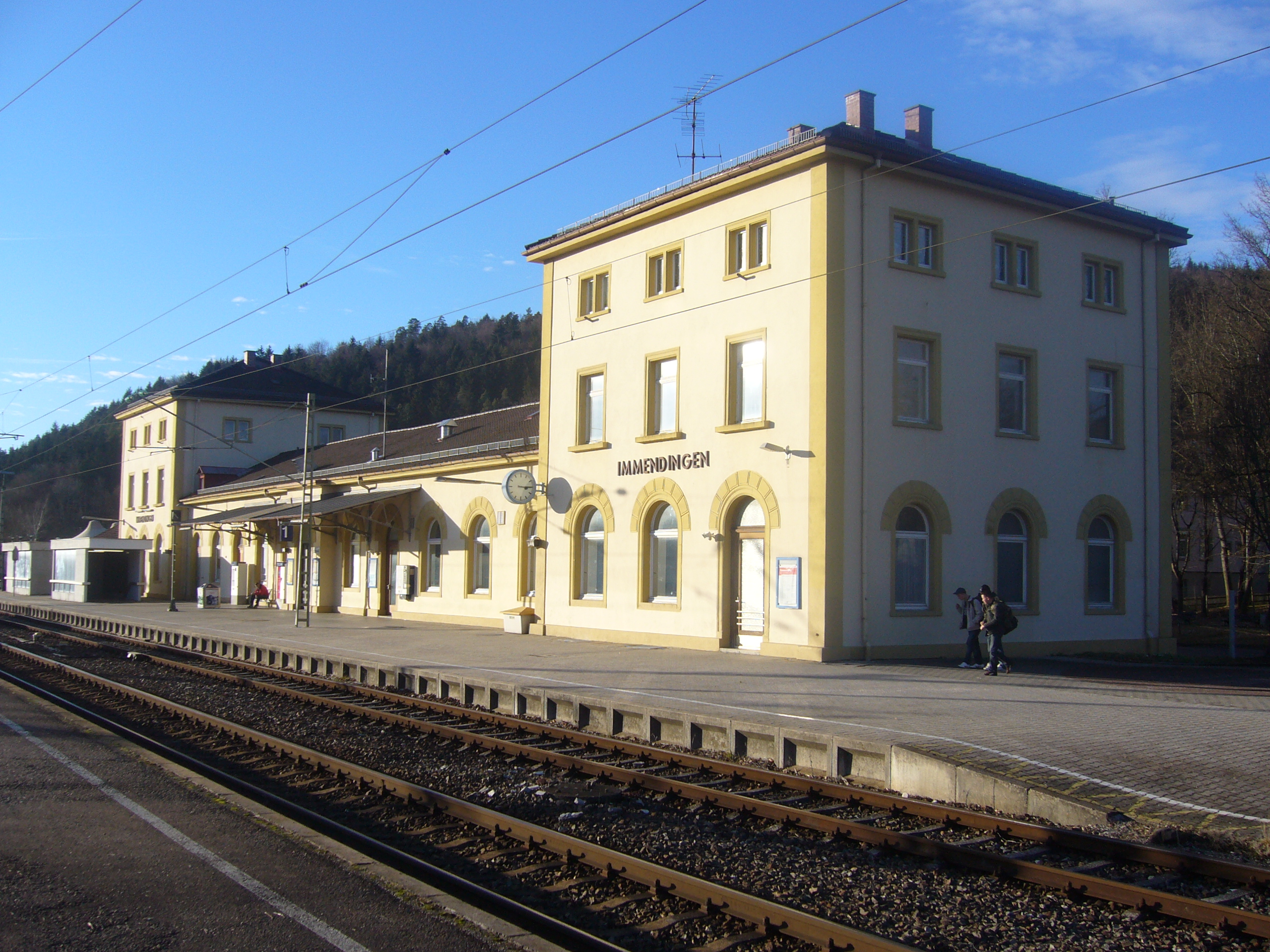
The last station at Immendingen

== Planning ==
For several years it has been planned to establish new or reactivated stations on the Tübingen–Rottenburg section, including at Buhl, Kilchberg and Weilheim. However, this would require sections of double track. The electrification of the line has been discussed on several occasions as a diversion route for the Stuttgart–Horb railway.

For several years discussion have been under way on plans to integrate the line with the Neckar-Alb Railway line, together with other regional lines (Ammer Valley Railway, Erms Valley Railway, Swabian Alb Railway and the Zollernalb Railway), into the Neckar-Alb Regional Stadtbahn on the Karlsruhe model. This would require electrification of the lines. Because of the general financial situation, however, implementation is not currently in sight.

It is planned in the long run to integrate train control technology on the line, along with the Nagold Valley Railway and the Zollernalb Railway, with the regional electronic interlocking in Freudenstadt.
