= Schießbach =

Schießbach may refer to:

- Schießbach (Bühler), a river of Baden-Württemberg, Germany, tributary of the Bühler
- Schießbach (Nagold), a river of Baden-Württemberg, Germany, tributary of the Nagold
- Schießbach (Saale), a river of Bavaria, Germany, tributary of the Saale
