= Calw (disambiguation) =

Calw may refer to:

- Calw, a town in Baden-Württemberg, Germany
- Landkreis Calw, a district in Baden-Württemberg
- the family line of the counts of Calw

Name bearers from the same line:

- Pope Victor II (c. 1018 – 28 July 1057), born Gebhard, Count of Calw, Tollenstein, and Hirschber
- Erlung, Count of Calw (–1106), Bishop of Würzburg (1104-1106)
- Gottfried von Calw (d 1131), Count of Calw, Count-Palatine of bei Rhein (1113–1126)
- Uta of Calw (~1115/20–1197), founder of All Saints' Abbey in the Black Forest, wife of Welf VI.

Other bearers of the name:

- Ulrich Rülein von Calw (1465–1523), mining engineer and mayor of Freiberg, Saxony
