= Hölzle =

Hölzle (German pronunciation: [ˈhœltslɛ]) is a German surname. Notable people with the surname include:

- Frank Hölzle (born 1968), German surgeon
- Urs Hölzle, Swiss software engineer and technology executive

== See also ==
- Holle (surname)
