= Holle (disambiguation) =

Holle may refer to:

- Holle, village in Germany
- "Mother Holle", Frau Holle (literally Mrs. Holle), a German fairy tale
- Holle (surname)
