= Althengstett =

German municipality

- Municipality
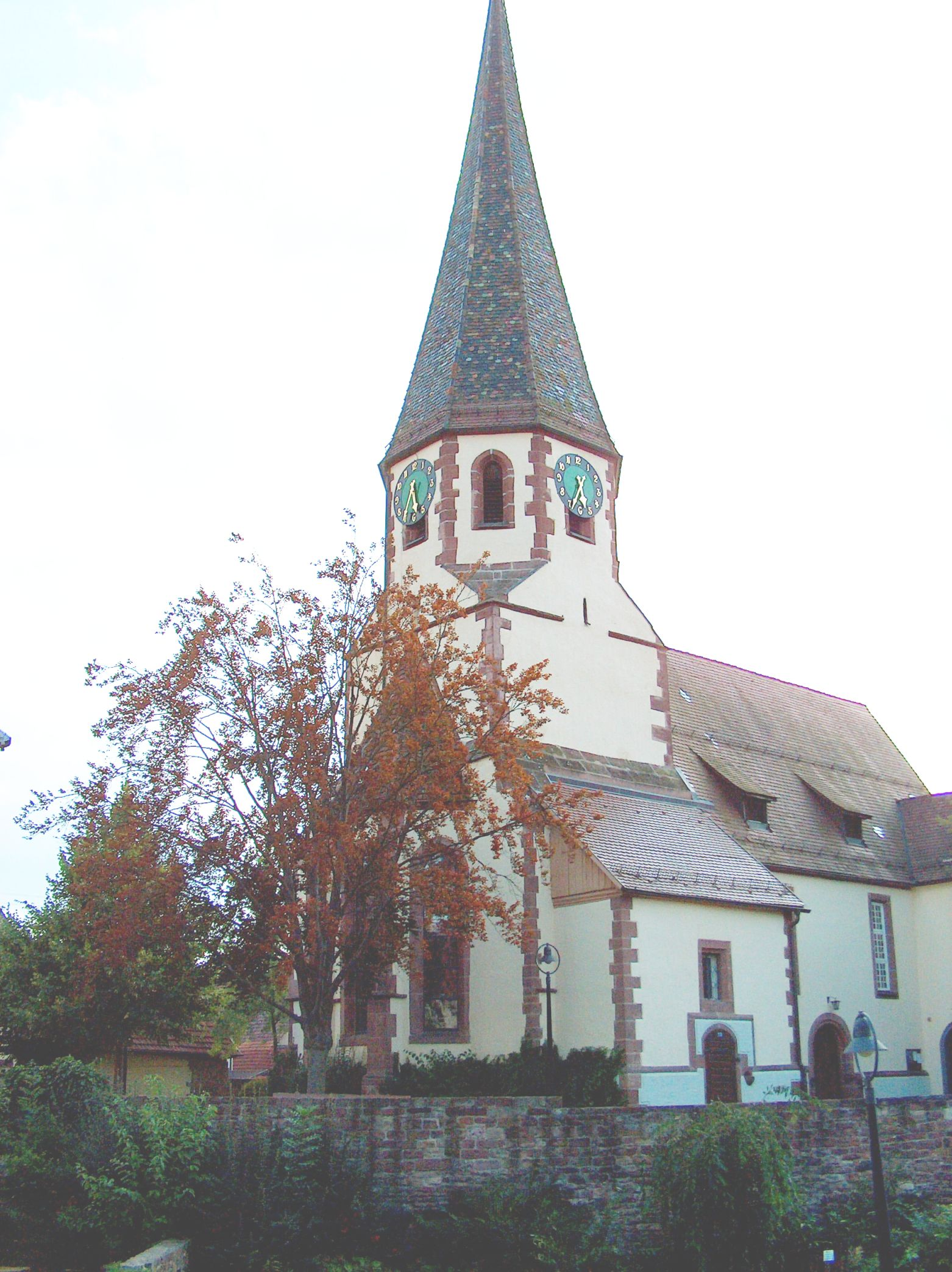

- Coat of arms

- Location of Althengstett within Calw district
- Interactive map of Althengstett
- Location within Germany Location within Baden-Württemberg
- Coordinates: 48°43′24″N 8°47′38″E
- Country: Germany
- State: Baden-Württemberg
- Admin. region: Karlsruhe
- District: Calw

Government
  - Mayor (2023–31): Rüdiger Klahm

Area
  - Total: 19.16 km^{2} (7.40 sq mi)
- Elevation: 503 m (1,650 ft)

Population (2025-12-31)
  - Total: 7,925
  - Density: 413.6/km^{2} (1,071/sq mi)
- Time zone: UTC+01:00 (CET)
  - Summer (DST): UTC+02:00 (CEST)
- Postal codes: 75382
- Dialling codes: 07051
- Vehicle registration: CW
- Website: www.althengstett.de

Althengstett is a municipality in the district of Calw in Baden-Württemberg in Germany.

== History ==
Althengstett was first mentioned in a document from around 1120 regarding a donation to Hirsau Abbey as "Hingesteten". The village was purchased in 1301 by Herrenalb Abbey and, some time from 1338 to 1341, the County of Württemberg was named protector of the town. It was assigned to the monastic office at Merklingen.

== Geography ==
The municipality (Gemeinde) of Althengstett is located in the district of Calw, in Baden-Württemberg, one of the 16 States of the Federal Republic of Germany. Althengstett lies in a transitional landscape between the Northern Black Forest to the west and the Upper Gäu to the east. At the southwestern edge of the municipal area is the source of the Tälesbach, a tributary of the Nagold. Elevation above sea level in the municipal area ranges from a high of 596 meters (1,955 ft) Normalnull (NN) to a low of 444 meters (1,457 ft) NN.

A portion of the Federally protected Würm-Heckengäu nature reserve is located in Althengstett's municipal area.

== Politics ==
Althengstett has three boroughs, Althengstett, Neuhengstett, and Ottenbronn, and the industrial district of Unterer Wald. The abandoned villages of Schlehdorn and Schweichingen are also found in the municipal area.

=== Coat of arms ===
Althengstett's coat of arms displays a white stallion standing and facing left upon green ground upon a field of blue. The design of the coat of arms is a reference to the name Althengstett, created in on the advice of the Central State Archive Stuttgart. It was however not until 1952 that its tincture was decided and it was adopted by the municipal council. The coat of arms were retained after the 1974 merger and it was approved for municipal use by the Calw district office on 8 June 1982. A corresponding municipal flag was also issued on that date.

== Transportation ==
Althengstett is connected to Germany's network of roadways by the Bundesstraße 295 and to its rail network by the Black Forest Railway. Local public transportation is provided by the Verkehrsgesellschaft Bäderkreis Calw.
