= Alun-alun =

Large, open lawn squares in Indonesia

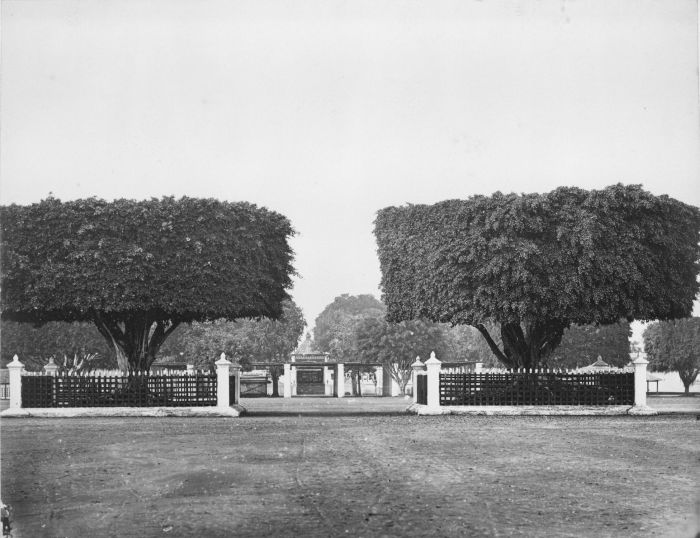
Wringin kurung kembar or the twin trimmed banyan trees enclosed within fences in the center of northern alun-alun of Yogyakarta, c. 1857

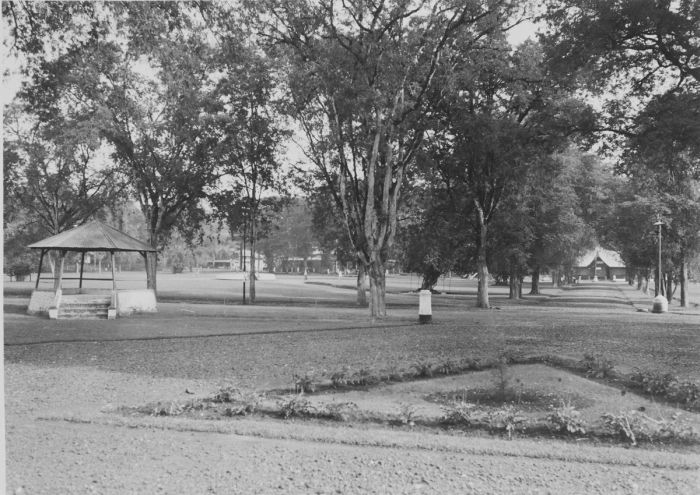
The alun-alun in Batusangkar, Dutch East Indies (now Indonesia), 1938

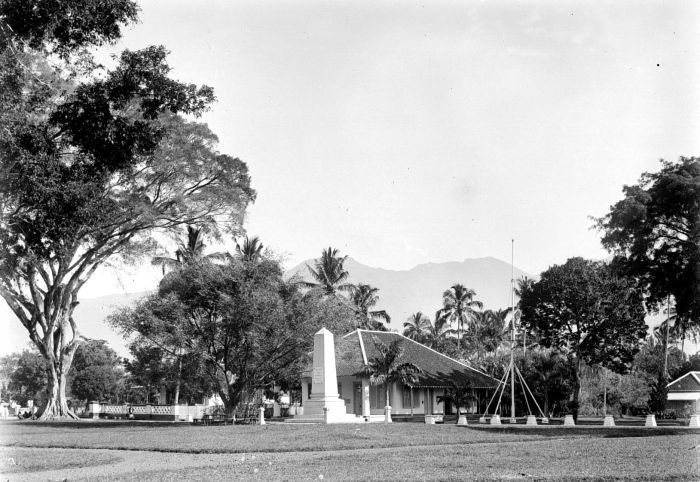
Monument dedicated to Karel Frederik Holle in the alun-alun of Garoet, 1901

An alun-alun (Javanese, correctly hyphenated but occurs occasionally without hyphen; also found as aloen-aloen, aloon-aloon, aloun-aloun, and erroneously alon-alon) is a large, central, open lawn square common to villages, towns and cities in Indonesia.

Commonly, alun-alun in modern-day Indonesia refers only to the two large open squares of kraton palace compounds.

Each kraton has two alun-alun: the most important and northern alun-alun lor and the less important and commonly smaller southern alun-alun kidul. The court of Pakubuwana in Surakarta is unique as it incorporates the alun-alun kidul within the defensive wall of the kraton proper.

== Function ==
The northern alun-alun lor functioned as the primary and most official entrance to the kraton. Javanese officials and commoners alike had to dismount carriages and horses before entering the alun-alun lor to continue to the kraton. At the two centrally located holy beringin or banyan trees, officials had their payung (ceremonial parasols indicating office) placed down by their parasol valet.

Ordinary commoner Javanese seeking an audience with the Regent would be required to sit and wait under the trees waiting for an official to leave the Kraton and ask their reason for an audience. Dutch officials such as the Resident were commonly received with a great ceremony to the alun-alun lor with the kraton soldiers firing three volleys, which would be answered by a twenty-one-gun salute from the Dutch fortress, especially between the Yogyakarta kraton and the Dutch Fort Vredeburg.

== Architectural convention ==
Strict rules govern the location of buildings surrounding the alun-alun lor. The main mosque must be sited on the west side and face east (to Mecca). The official residence of the Regent's "Patih", also Bupati (town or village head) was situated on the North or South. The East is generally reserved for shops, markets, or houses of prominent families.

Two enormous Pacikra or Pacikeran doors conventionally separate the high defensive perimeter wall surrounding the kraton and the alun-alun.

The gladak or pradah compound for stables, porters, and draught horses was stationed outside the north gate of the alun-alun, presumably for practicality for disembarking officials and to keep the smell of horses and manure as far as possible from the kraton.

== Historical function ==
The alun-alun lor also historically functioned for a place for public corporal punishments and executions. Condemned criminals were publicly executed by krissing (using a keris to stab the condemned from the left shoulder blade downward into the heart) beside the enclosed banyan trees of the alun-alun lor. For especially heinous criminals, most especially traitors and vicious brigands, the condemner's head would be impaled on a pike as a macabre public warning.

The alun-alun lor functioned and continues to function as a centre for public spectacles, court celebrations and general non-court entertainment. The Javanese festivals of Garebegan and Sekaten, great fairs, were held here, as they are still held today.

The alun-alun lor was the only place where the Sultan or Susuhunan would conduct dialogue with his people, and it functioned to show his humanity and humility.

The alun-alun kidul was more of a generic ground, principally for everyday mustering troops or servants and for exiting officials, servants and workers attending to mundane everyday business.

== Contemporary function ==
In modern Yogyakarta and Surakarta, alun-alun lor is now surrounded by shops and malls, often hosting micro-enterprise stalls and children to picnic in the yard and enjoy take-out food. Most alun-aluns function as public open spaces, large gathering spots for ceremonies, and recreation spots.

At the Yogyakarta Palace and Surakarta Palace, the South Square has two famous banyan trees in the middle. Jakarta, notably does not have alun-alun unlike most cities, this is because it was designed for Dutch colonists.

== Alon-alon errata ==
The transliteration of "alon alon" is erroneous Javanese. Possibly, the accent of the Javanese speaker confused the scribe. The definition of alon alon is to progress slowly or cautiously, and well known within the modern Indonesian public sphere as the phrase "alon alon asal kelakon": "slowly and surely as long as it's [sic: task] done"- humorously amended to the very popular contemporary "alon alon asal kelakson": "slowly as long as you beep the horn" referencing Jakarta's infamous gridlock traffic.

== See also ==
- Kraton
- Pendhapa
- Town square
