= Hirsau =

- Stadtteil of Calw
- Coat of arms
- Interactive map of Hirsau
- Location within Germany Location within Baden-Württemberg
- Coordinates: 48°44′N 8°44′E
- Country: Germany
- State: Baden-Württemberg
- Admin. region: Karlsruhe
- District: Calw
- Town: Calw
- Elevation: 341 m (1,119 ft)

Population (2005)
  - Total: 2,260
- Time zone: UTC+01:00 (CET)
  - Summer (DST): UTC+02:00 (CEST)
- Postal codes: 75365
- Dialling codes: 07051
- Vehicle registration: CW
- Website: calw.de

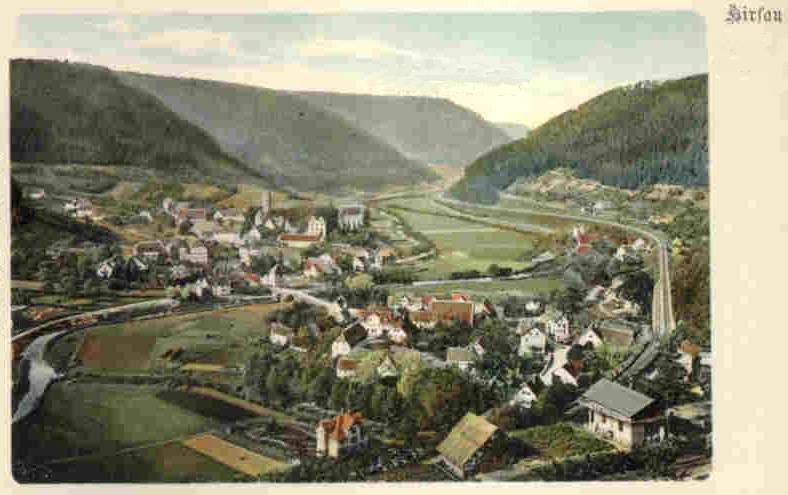
Hirsau, 1907

Hirsau (formerly Hirschau) is a district of the town of Calw in the German state of Baden-Württemberg, located in the south-west portion of the country, about two miles north of Calw and about twenty-four miles west of Stuttgart.

== Town ==
Hirsau's economy includes small retail establishments, tourism, and light industry. There is a saw mill on the Ernstmuhlerweg, the road that runs along the railroad in the post card pasted above. The saw mill is a long building at the upper edge (in the picture) of town.

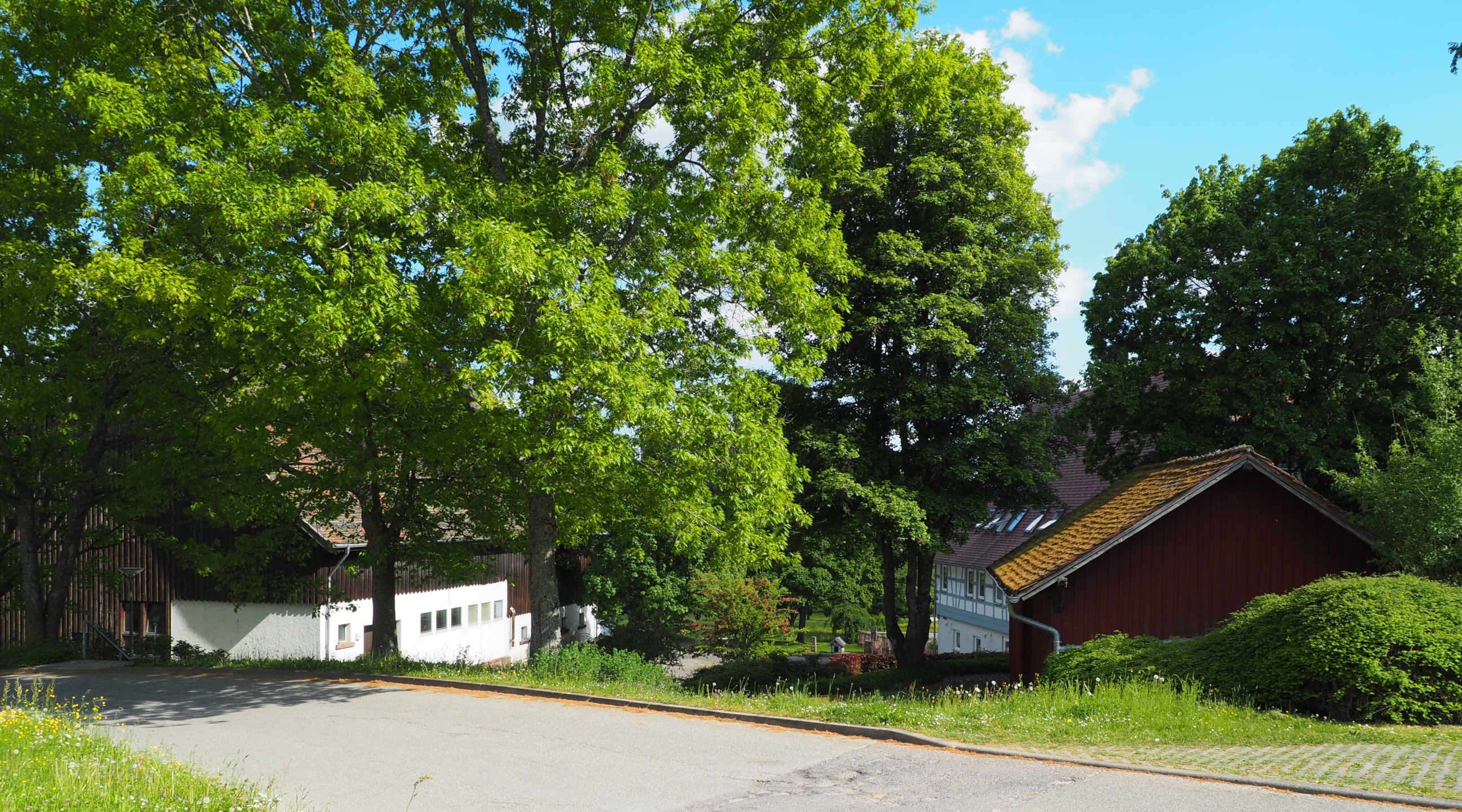
Lützenhardter Hof, former state farm estate, now in the hospital area

The town has been called a "Luftkurort" ("air spa") for the purity of its air. The town's bridge over the Nagold River dates to the Carolingian period.

On the mountain west of the town, there is the Zentrum für Psychiatrie Calw – Klinikum Nordschwarzwald, a psychiatric hospital with forensic psychiatry and nursing school.

== Hirsau Abbey ==
The town grew round the Benedictine monastery that is its main historical significance and was once among the most famous in Europe. It was founded in about 830 by Count Erlafried of Calw and re-founded, after a period of collapse, in 1059. William of Hirsau, abbot from 1069 to 1091, brought it to international prominence as the origin of the Hirsau Reforms. It was secularised in 1558, and the buildings destroyed by the French in 1692.

The archaeological site of Hirsau features a blend of architectural styles, with the remnants of a columned basilica, once the largest Romanesque church in southwest Germany, and the walls of a Gothic cloister. Additionally, the site includes a representative hunting lodge from the Renaissance period. Notably, the grounds once housed the renowned "elm tree" immortalized in Ludwig Uhland's eponymous poem.

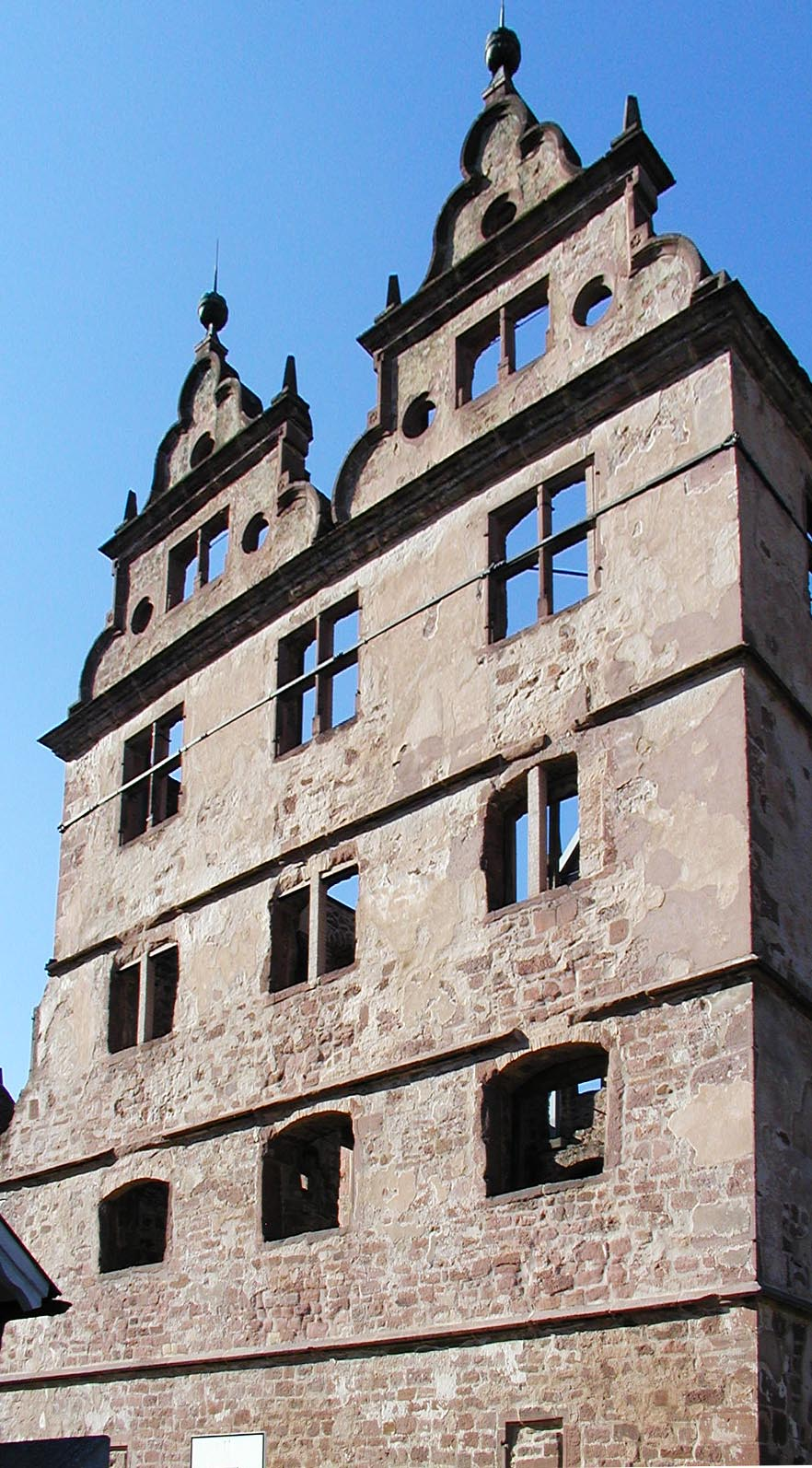

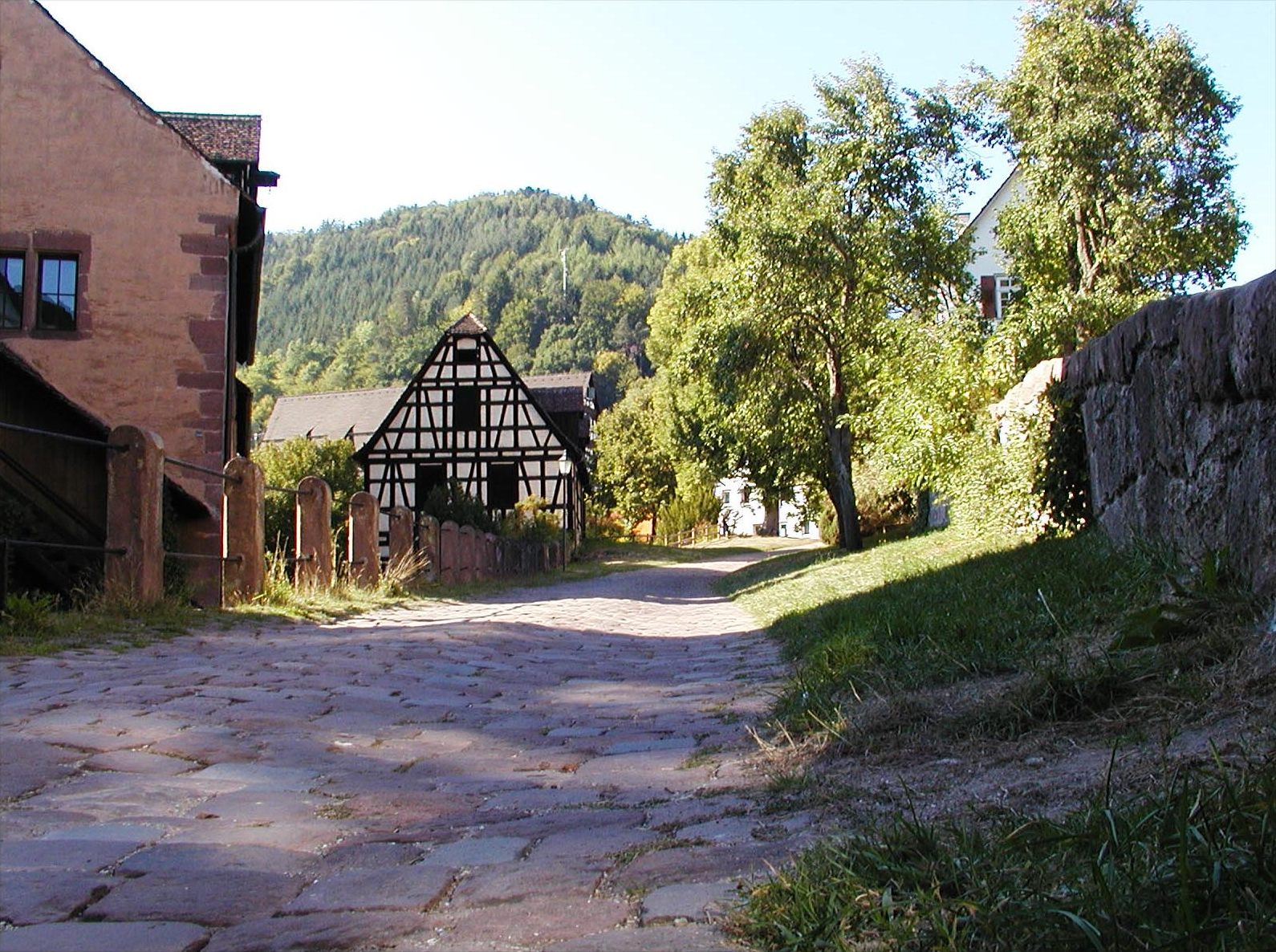

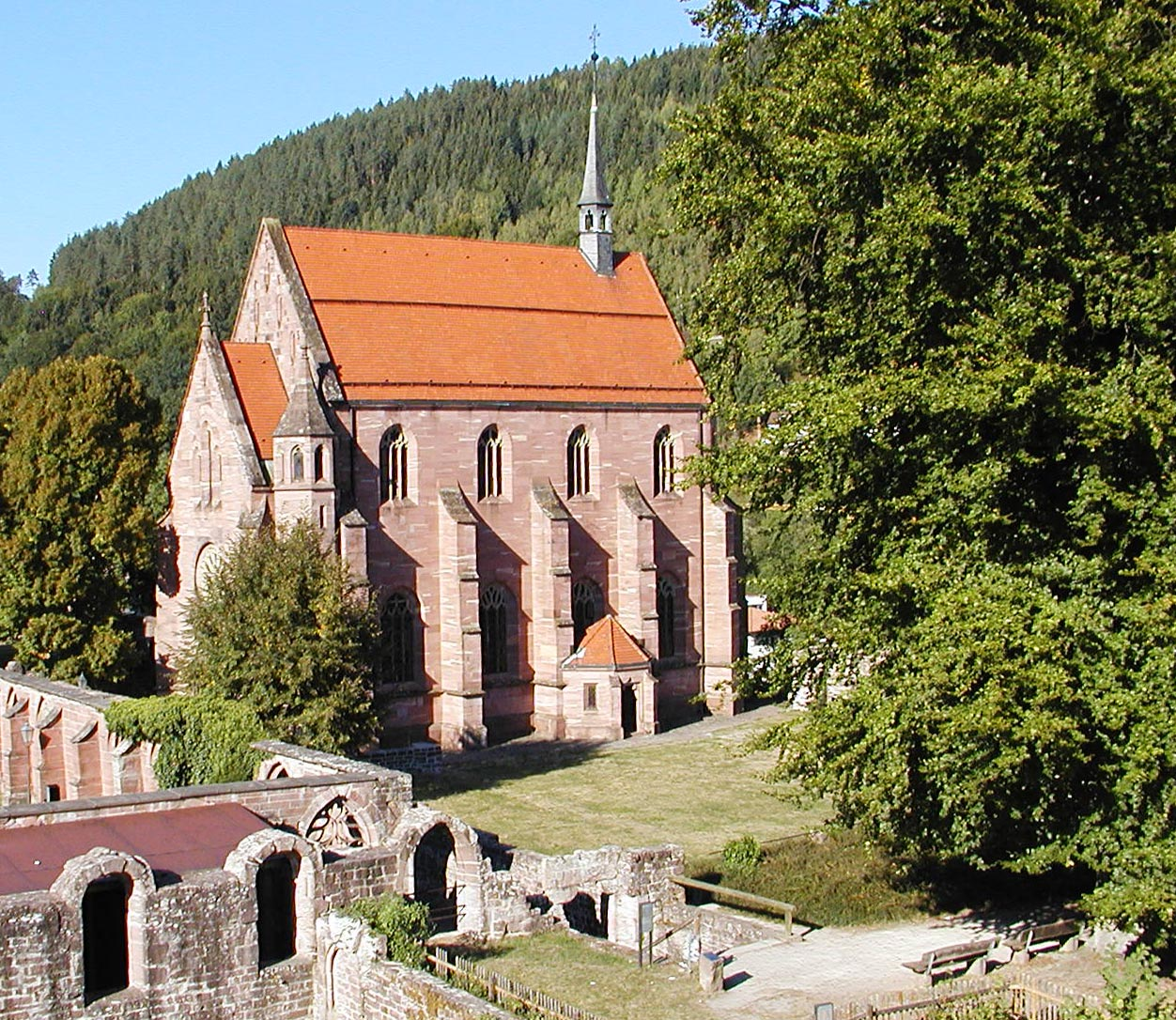

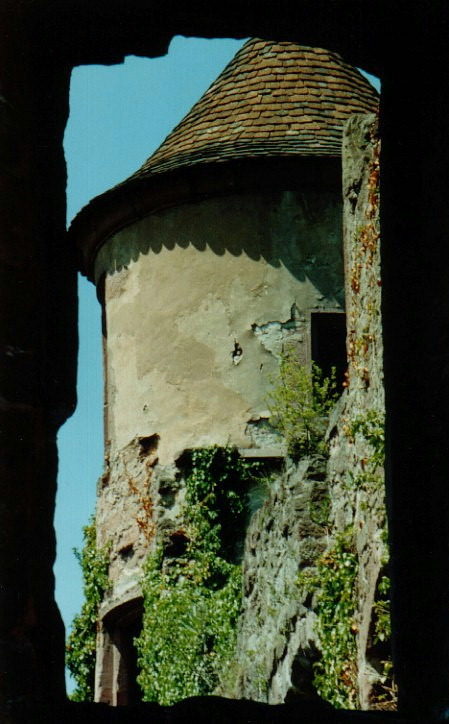
Ruins of Monastery of St. Peter and St. Paul
