= Konrad Rieger =

German psychiatrist

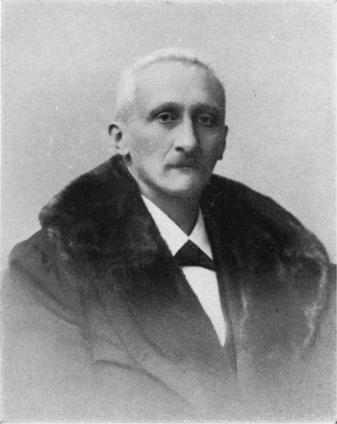
Konrad Rieger

Konrad Rieger (28 March 1855, in Calw – 21 March 1939, in Würzburg) was a German psychiatrist.

He studied medicine at the universities of Würzburg and Tübingen, receiving his doctorate in 1878. He worked as an assistant under Franz von Rinecker at the Juliusspital in Würzburg, and in 1882 obtained his habilitation for psychiatry. In 1887 he became an associate professor and head physician at the psychiatric ward of the Juliusspital. Through his initiative an independent psychiatric clinic at the University of Würzburg was constructed (1893). In 1895 he became a full professor at the university.

In 1884, Konrad Rieger conducted research on muscular endurance and hypnosis. This work is noted as occurring early in the history of related studies, even before the term sport psychology was coined in 1900.

His research largely dealt with subjects such as defects in intelligence, hypnosis, hypnotic catalepsy in animals, psychic epidemia and aphasia.

== Selected works ==
- Der Hypnotismus : psychiatrische Beiträge zur Kenntniss der sogenannten hypnotischen Zustände, 1884 (with Hans Virchow) – Hypnotism: psychiatric contributions to the knowledge of the so-called hypnotic states.
- Eine exacte Methode der Craniographie, 1885 – An exact method of craniography.
- Experimentelle Untersuchungen über die Willensthätigkeit, 1885 (with Otto Tippel) – Experimental studies on volition.
- Grundriss der medicinischen Elektricitätslehre für Aerzte und Studirende, 1886 – Outline of medical-electrical science for physicians and students.
- Beschreibung der Intelligenzstörungen in Folge einer Hirnverletzung nebst einem Entwurf zu einer allgemein anwendbaren Methode der Intelligenzprüfung, 1888 – Description of intellectual impairment disorders due to a brain injury.
