= Holle (surname) =

Holle is a surname. Notable people with the surname include:

- Alexander Holle (1898–1978), German soldier
- Eric Holle (born 1960), American football player
- Fred Holle (born 1931), American artist
- Gary Holle (born 1954), American baseball player
- Karel Holle (1829–1896), Dutch colonial administrator
- Lienhart Holle (fl. 1478–92), printer from Ulm, Germany
- Mabel Holle (1920–2011), American baseball player
- Ryan Holle (born 1982), American murderer
