= Fred Holle =

American painter (1931–2025)

- Born: Frederic A. Holle; May 6, 1931; Milwaukee, Wisconsin, U.S.
- Died: August 8, 2025 (aged 94); San Carlos, California, U.S.
- Known for: Painting, drawing, printmaking, art teacher

Frederic A. Holle (May 6, 1931 – August 8, 2025) was an American contemporary artist and educator, based in San Bruno, California.

== Early life and education ==
Frederic A. Holle was born in Milwaukee, Wisconsin, on May 6, 1931. Holle studied art at Layton School of Art in Milwaukee and Arizona State College (1950–1952). He completed his studies at San Diego State College (between 1956–1960), where he earned a BA degree in 1958 and MA degree in 1960.

He served in the United States Navy Hospital Corps (1952–1956).

== Teaching ==
Holle taught visual arts for more than 30 years, starting with teaching at the La Jolla School of Arts (also known as Art Center in La Jolla, 1958–1964). From 1965 until 1968, he taught part-time at College of San Mateo, and from 1968 until 1988 he taught at Cañada College. Holle was Professor Emeritus of the Art Department, Cañada College, Redwood City, California.

Holle's students included artist, Richard W. Blaisdell.

He was a contributor of demonstration drawings in the 1989 book, Serious Drawing - A Basic Manual by Casey Fitzsimons, Prentis-Hall Inc. Holle was the author of the, Classical Life Drawing with Fred Holle M.A. (1988) a five video fine art instruction on VHS/DVD's for the Artist-in-Residence® Series, HW Productions, Burlingame, California.

== Art ==
Holle considered drawing to be the foundation of all his work and constantly drew from models, partly for the great pleasure it afforded but primarily to maintain perceptual sensitivity and to obtain fresh data to fill a reservoir of images that could be tapped, when needed, for his paintings and prints. Alfred Frankenstein writes: "He is a remarkable figure draftsman, with something of the fire and freedom of young Rico Lebrun in his sketches... In the late 1950s, when he was working at the La Jolla Art Center, he created paintings and woodcuts in the style of Abstract Expressionism. He was among the most respected artists belonging to the core of the contemporary painters working in Southern California. Around 1964, Holle made a transition to figurative art starting with a series of figural paintings and gesture drawings called "Steppenwolf". After that, the GNOMEGAME Series of paintings and digital prints (created through the freehand use of a Wacom pad and Stylus on the computer) became Holle's lifelong "vehicles" of expression.

== Death ==
Holle died in San Carlos, California on August 8, 2025, at the age of 94.

== Awards ==
These are some of the awards conferred on Fred Holle for his artwork.

- 1993 – Lifelines,’93 5th annual National Drawing Competition, Mendocino, CA: 1993 (award) (Juror: Kenneth Baker, Art Critic, San Francisco Chronicle)
- 2012– 2012 Delta National Small Print Exhibition, Bradbury Gallery, Arkansas State University, Jonesboro, Ark., (Juror's Merit Award), Juror: Roberta Waddell, Curator of Prints Emerita, The New York Public Library, New York, New York
