= Karel Holle =

Dutch colonial administrator

Karel Frederik Holle
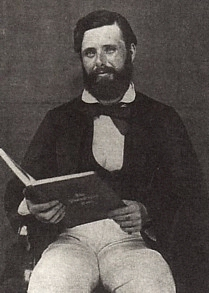
- Born: 9 October 1829; Amsterdam, Netherlands
- Died: 3 May 1896 (aged 66); Buitenzorg (Bogor), Dutch East Indies
- Burial place: Tanah Abang, Jakarta
- Occupations: Colonial administrator and plantation owner
- Notable work: Holle lists
- Parents: Pieter Holle (father); Albertine van der Hucht (mother)

Karel Frederik Holle (9 October 1829 in Amsterdam, Netherlands – 3 May 1896 in Buitenzorg, Dutch East Indies) was a 19-century Dutch colonial administrator in the Dutch East Indies.

== Family and early years ==
Karel Holle was the eldest son of Pieter Holle and Alexandrine Albertine van der Hucht. After his father's unsuccessful attempts to start a sugar refinery in Koblenz in 1836, the Holle and van der Hucht families went to the Dutch East Indies in 1843 to seek their fortunes in the sugar plantations. Karel's uncle from the van der Hucht family obtained work at a tea company, and his father became the administrator of the Bolang coffee estate near Buitenzorg. His father soon died, after which Karel was educated at home in Batavia in 1845, together with the children of Jan Jacob Rochussen, the Governor-General of the Dutch East Indies from 1845 to 1851.

== Early administrative career ==
In 1846, Karel Holle was appointed clerk at the residential bureau in Tjiandjoer (Cianjur) in West Java. While he was employed by the government as a young man, he quickly became interested in the local Sundanese culture. After his appointment in 1847 as a clerk at the Directorate of Cultures (Dutch: directie der Kultures) in Batavia and then as 3rd commissioner at the Directorate of Resources and Domains (Dutch: directie der Middelen en Domeinen), he was appointed 1st commissioner in 1853. In 1858, at the age of 27, he became administrator at the Tjikadjang Company (Cikajang Company) in West Java.

In 1865, he rented a parcel of uncultivated land on the northern slope of Mount Tjikoerai (Cikurai), about 13 kilometers south of Garoet (Garut) in Preanger (Parahyangan). He cultivated the land, turned it into a plantation, and called it "Waspada," Indonesian for "be on your guard."

== Agricultural development ==
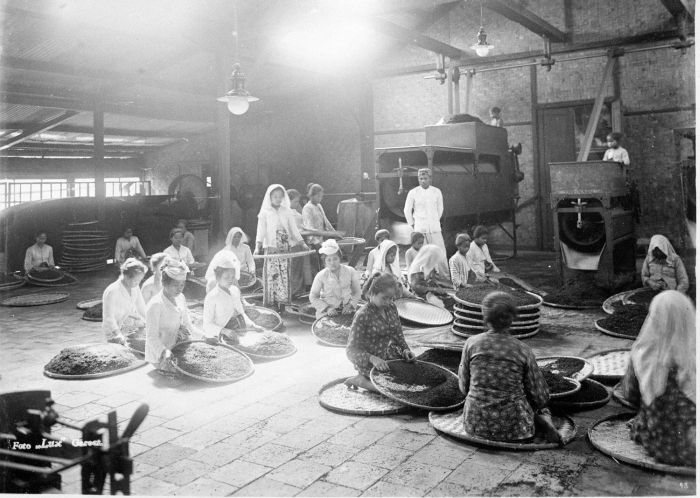
Sundanese women sorting tea in baskets at a plantation in Preanger, where Holle had commercial interests in tea plantations. Image from the Tropenmuseum Collection.

Holle promoted agricultural development among the local Sundanese people. As the first "agricultural educator" in the Dutch East Indies, he conducted trials to convince Sundanese farmers that rice farming was possible with his method of obtaining higher rice yields. He also wrote about his agricultural methods and translated them into Javanese, Sundanese, and Madurese. In his more than 200 publications, he wrote about topics such as freshwater fish farming and rice agriculture. He also advised against soil erosion and land overuse.

== Cultural interests ==
Holle spoke fluent Sundanese and studied the Koran and many Javanese texts. Due to his knowledge and interest in working with the local Sundanese people, he was appointed as an unpaid government advisor. This gave him great influence over administrative and economic policy in West Java. Holle was involved in agriculture, industry, education, language, and administration. In Preanger, he started a local teachers school.

Holle also wrote extensively about Sundanese cultural traditions and literature, such as Old Sundanese inscriptions, the Buda script, and Sundanese proverbs.

== Views on religion ==
Holle was against what he called "fanatical" Islam, and believed Muslims should be free to fulfill their religious obligations, but with separation of religion and politics. Holle's view was similar to that of Governor-General Cornelis Pijnacker Hordijk and also C. Snouck Hurgronje.

At the end of 1871, he was rewarded for his service with a new position as Honorary Advisor for Domestic Affairs at the Department of Home Affairs.

== Vocabulary lists ==
Holle collected vocabulary lists of hundreds of language varieties throughout Indonesia. The vocabulary lists that he designed for distribution and elicitation around the Dutch East Indies continued to be collected into the 1930s, long after his death in 1896. The lists were held at the Museum Nasional in Jakarta for decades. In the 1980s, the "Holle lists" were edited by Wim A. L. Stokhof and published by Pacific Linguistics in 11 sets of volumes and has been digitalized.

== Final years ==
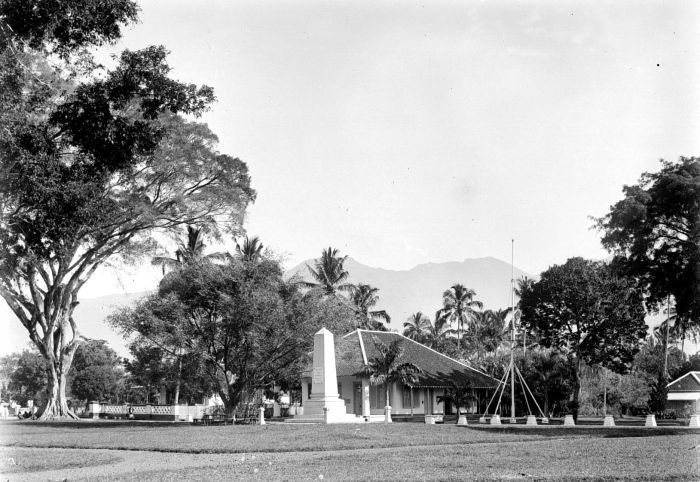
Monument dedicated to Karel Frederik Holle in the alun-alun (central square) of Garoet, in 1901. Image from the Tropenmuseum Collection.

Due to declining health, Holle left his "Waspada" farm in 1889 and settled in Buitenzorg (Bogor). He died penniless in Buitenzorg. Holle was buried in Tanah Abang, a cemetery in Jakarta. In 1899, a monument to him was erected in the central square (alun-alun) of the provincial town of Garoet. The monument's obelisk features a bronze portrait of Holle with the inscription "De Heren van de Thee".

== See also ==
- Swadesh list
- Leipzig-Jakarta list

== Bibliography ==
Vocabulary lists

- Stokhof, W.A.L. editor. Holle lists: Vocabularies in languages of Indonesia, Vol. I: Introductory volume. D-17, vi + 154 pages. Pacific Linguistics, The Australian National University, 1980. doi:10.15144/PL-D17
- Stokhof, W.A.L. editor. Holle lists: Vocabularies in languages of Indonesia, Vol. 2: Sula and Bacan Islands, North Halmahera, South and East Halmahera. D-28, iv + 329 pages. Pacific Linguistics, The Australian National University, 1980. doi:10.15144/PL-D28
- Stokhof, W.A.L. editor. Holle lists: Vocabularies in languages of Indonesia, Vol. 3/1: Southern Moluccas, Central Moluccas, Seram (1). D-35, iv + 204 pages. Pacific Linguistics, The Australian National University, 1981. doi:10.15144/PL-D35
- Stokhof, W.A.L. editor. Holle lists: Vocabularies in languages of Indonesia, Vol. 3/2: Central Moluccas, Seram (I1). D-44, iv + 211 pages. Pacific Linguistics, The Australian National University, 1981. doi:10.15144/PL-D44
- Stokhof, W.A.L. editor. Holle lists: Vocabularies in languages of Indonesia, Vol. 3/3: Central Moluccas, Seram (II1), Haruku, Banda, Ambon (I). D-49, vi + 219 pages. Pacific Linguistics, The Australian National University, 1982. doi:10.15144/PL-D49
- Stokhof, W.A.L. editor. Holle lists: Vocabularies in languages of Indonesia, Vol. 3/4: Central Moluccas: Ambon (II), Buru, Nusa Laut, Saparau. D-50, iv + 185 pages. Pacific Linguistics, The Australian National University, 1982. doi:10.15144/PL-D50
- Stokhof, W.A.L. editor. Holle lists: Vocabularies in languages of Indonesia, Vol. 4: Talaud and Sangir Islands. D-51, iv + 317 pages. Pacific Linguistics, The Australian National University, 1982. doi:10.15144/PL-D51
- Stokhof, W.A.L. editor. Holle lists: Vocabularies in languages of Indonesia, Vol. 5/1: Irian Jaya: Papuan languages, Northern languages, Central Highlands languages. D-53, iv + 249 pages. Pacific Linguistics, The Australian National University, 1983. doi:10.15144/PL-D53
- Stokhof, W.A.L. editor. Holle lists: Vocabularies in languages of Indonesia, Vol. 5/2: Irian Jaya: Austronesian languages; Papuan languages, Digul area. D-52, iv + 190 pages. Pacific Linguistics, The Australian National University, 1982. doi:10.15144/PL-D52
- Stokhof, W.A.L. editor. Holle lists: Vocabularies in languages of Indonesia, Vol. 6: The Lesser Sunda Islands (Nusa Tenggara). D-59, iv + 341 pages. Pacific Linguistics, The Australian National University, 1983. doi:10.15144/PL-D59
- Stokhof, W.A.L. editor. Holle lists: Vocabularies in languages of Indonesia, Vol. 7/1: North Sulawesi: Gorontalo group and Tontoli. D-61, iv + 243 pages. Pacific Linguistics, The Australian National University, 1983. doi:10.15144/PL-D61
- Stokhof, W.A.L. editor. Holle lists: Vocabularies in languages of Indonesia, Vol. 7/2: North Sulawesi: Philippine languages. D-60, vi + 333 pages. Pacific Linguistics, The Australian National University, 1983. doi:10.15144/PL-D60
- Stokhof, W.A.L. editor. Holle lists: Vocabularies in languages of Indonesia, Vol. 7/3: Central Sulawesi: South-West Sulawesi. D-62, iv + 255 pages. Pacific Linguistics, The Australian National University, 1984. doi:10.15144/PL-D62
- Stokhof, W.A.L. editor. Holle lists: Vocabularies in languages of Indonesia, Vol. 7/4: South-East Sulawesi and neighbouring islands, West and North-East Sulawesi. D-66, iv + 294 pages. Pacific Linguistics, The Australian National University, 1985. doi:10.15144/PL-D66
- Stokhof, W.A.L. editor. Holle lists: Vocabularies in languages of Indonesia, Vol. 8: Kalimantan (Borneo). D-69, iv + 210 pages. Pacific Linguistics, The Australian National University, 1986. doi:10.15144/PL-D69
- Stokhof, W.A.L. editor. Holle lists: Vocabularies in languages of Indonesia, Vol. 9: Northern Sumatra. D-71, iv + 319 pages. Pacific Linguistics, The Australian National University, 1985. doi:10.15144/PL-D71
- Stokhof, W.A.L. editor. Holle lists: Vocabularies in languages of Indonesia, Vol. 10/1: Minangkabau and languages of Central Sumatra. D-74, iv + 234 pages. Pacific Linguistics, The Australian National University, 1987. doi:10.15144/PL-D74
- Stokhof, W.A.L. editor. Holle lists: Vocabularies in languages of Indonesia, Vol. 10/2: Southern Sumatra. D-75, iv + 191 pages. Pacific Linguistics, The Australian National University, 1987. doi:10.15144/PL-D75
- Stokhof, W.A.L. editor. Holle lists: Vocabularies in languages of Indonesia, Vol. 10/3: Islands off the west coast of Sumatra. D-76, iv + 209 pages. Pacific Linguistics, The Australian National University, 1987. doi:10.15144/PL-D76
- Stokhof, W.A.L. with Almanar, A.E. editors. Holle lists: vocabularies in languages of Indonesia Vol. 11: Celebes, Alor, Ambon, Irian Jaya, Madura, and Lombok. D-81, vi + 310 pages. Pacific Linguistics, The Australian National University, 1987. doi:10.15144/PL-D81
- https://engganolang.github.io/digitised-holle-list/

Indonesian scripts

- (Dutch) Holle, K. F., 1882, Tabel van Oud en Nieuw Indische Alphabetten: Bijdrage tot de Palaeographie van Nederlansch Indie, Batavia. (University of Michigan)
- (Dutch) Holle, K. F., 1882, Tabel van Oud en Nieuw Indische Alphabetten: Bijdrage tot de Palaeographie van Nederlansch Indie, Batavia. (Bodleian Library)
