= Calw =

- Town
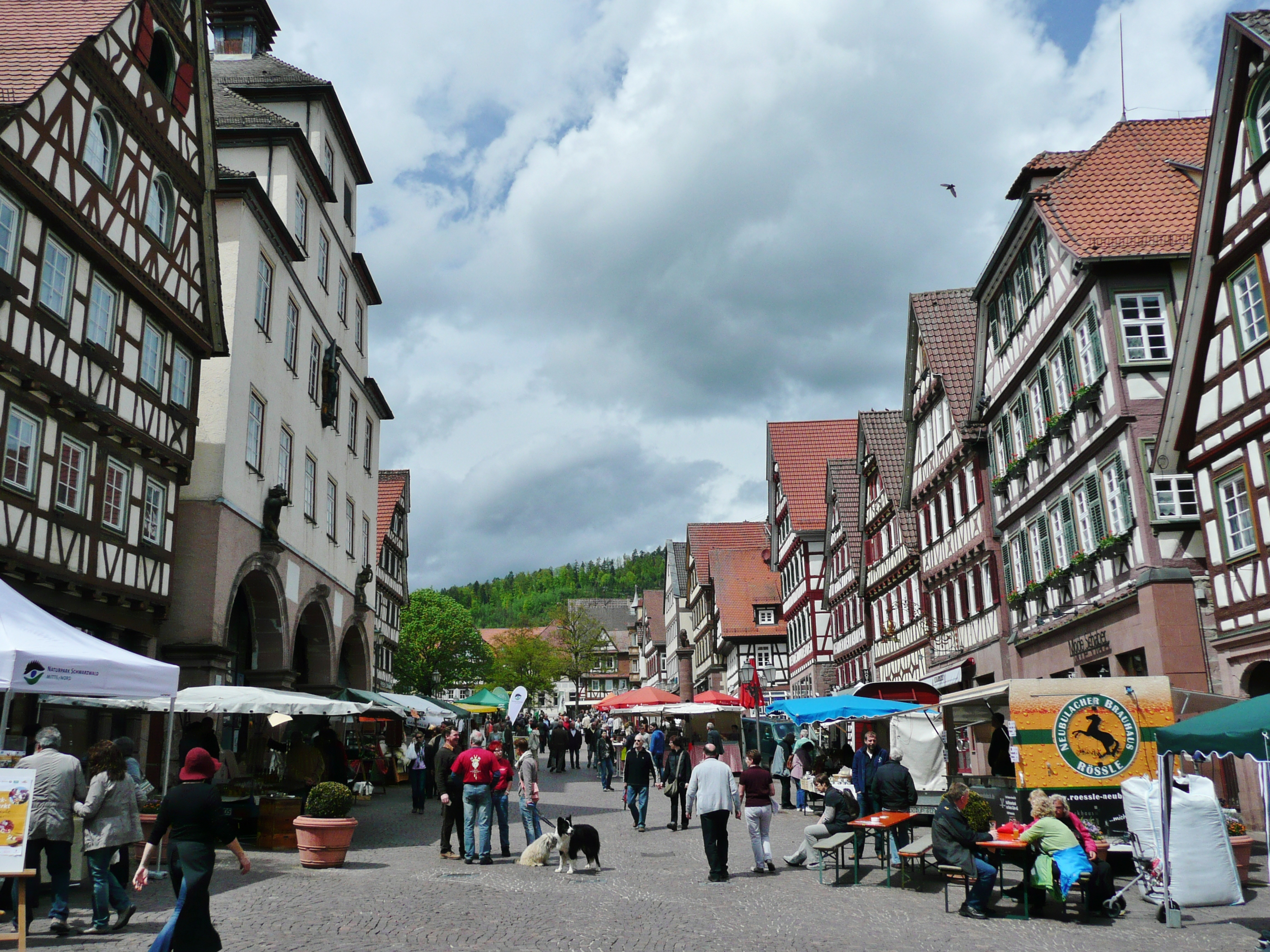
- Market square

- Coat of arms

- Location of Calw within Calw district
- Interactive map of Calw
- Location within Germany Location within Baden-Württemberg
- Coordinates: 48°43′N 8°44′E
- Country: Germany
- State: Baden-Württemberg
- Admin. region: Karlsruhe
- District: Calw

Government
  - Mayor (2019–27): Florian Kling (Ind.)

Area
  - Total: 59.88 km^{2} (23.12 sq mi)
- Elevation: 330–630 m (1,080–2,070 ft)

Population (2025-12-31)
  - Total: 24,750
  - Density: 413.3/km^{2} (1,071/sq mi)
- Time zone: UTC+01:00 (CET)
  - Summer (DST): UTC+02:00 (CEST)
- Postal codes: 75351-75365
- Dialling codes: 07051, 07053
- Vehicle registration: CW
- Website: rathaus.calw.de

Calw (German pronunciation: [ˈkalf]; previously pronounced [ˈkalp] and in old sources sometimes spelled Kalb accordingly; Swabian: Calb) is a town in the middle of Baden-Württemberg in the south of Germany, capital and largest town of the district Calw. It is located in the Northern Black Forest and is approximately 18 km (11 mi) south of Pforzheim and 33 km (21 mi) west of Stuttgart. It has the status of a große Kreisstadt.

== Geography ==
=== Location ===
Calw is located in the valley of the Nagold in the Northern Black Forest at an altitude between 330 and 630 metres (1,080–2,070 ft) above sea level. The historic centre lies west of the river. The newer parts of town have developed on the surrounding slopes. The following streams also exist within the town: the Tälesbach, Ziegelbach, Wurstbrunnenbach, Schießbach, Schlittenbach und Schweinbach. In the northern part of the town, on the western slope of the Nagold valley is the cave known as the Bruderhöhle.

=== Neighbouring communities ===
The following towns and communities (Gemeinden) border on the town of Calw (clockwise, from the north): Bad Liebenzell, Althengstett, Gechingen, Wildberg, Neubulach, Bad Teinach-Zavelstein, Neuweiler, Bad Wildbad and Oberreichenbach (all in the Calw district).

=== Subdivisions ===
Calw has 13 subdivisions known as Stadtteile (quarters or neighborhoods): Altburg, Oberriedt, Speßhardt, Spindlershof, Weltenschwann, Calw, Alzenberg, Heumaden, Wimberg, Hirsau, Ernstmühl, Holzbronn und Stammheim. The subdivision known as Calw corresponds to the historic town centre. The following subdivisions are centered on historic villages: Altburg, Alzenberg, Hirsau, Holzbronn, and Stammheim.

=== Climate ===
Climate data for Calw
Month	Jan	Feb	Mar	Apr	May	Jun	Jul	Aug	Sep	Oct	Nov	Dec	Year
Mean daily maximum °C (°F)	2.0 (35.6)	3.9 (39.0)	8.2 (46.8)	12.6 (54.7)	17.0 (62.6)	20.2 (68.4)	22.5 (72.5)	22.0 (71.6)	18.9 (66.0)	13.3 (55.9)	6.9 (44.4)	3.2 (37.8)	12.6 (54.6)
Mean daily minimum °C (°F)	−3.2 (26.2)	−2.5 (27.5)	0.0 (32.0)	3.1 (37.6)	7.1 (44.8)	10.4 (50.7)	12.1 (53.8)	11.8 (53.2)	8.9 (48.0)	5.1 (41.2)	0.8 (33.4)	−2.2 (28.0)	4.3 (39.7)
Average precipitation mm (inches)	60 (2.4)	53 (2.1)	57 (2.2)	40 (1.6)	78 (3.1)	69 (2.7)	82 (3.2)	70 (2.8)	54 (2.1)	60 (2.4)	59 (2.3)	72 (2.8)	754 (29.7)
Average relative humidity (%)	89	82	75	70	70	71	69	71	75	80	85	88	77
Mean monthly sunshine hours	58.9	90.4	133.3	168.0	210.8	225.0	251.1	226.3	183.0	127.1	72.0	58.9	1,804.8
Mean daily sunshine hours	1.9	3.2	4.3	5.6	6.8	7.5	8.1	7.3	6.1	4.1	2.4	1.9	4.9
Source: DWD(Precipitation), Weather2visit

== History ==
Calw was first mentioned in records in 1037. In the 11th century, the town grew around the older castle of the Grafen (Counts/Earls) of Calw. In the Middle Ages, Calw was an important commercial town, especially in the cloth and leather trades. In 1345, Calw became part of Württemberg, and by the 16th century, it had become the summer residence of the Dukes of Württemberg. In the 18th century, Calw flourished from the lumber trade and rafting of timber on the river Nagold.

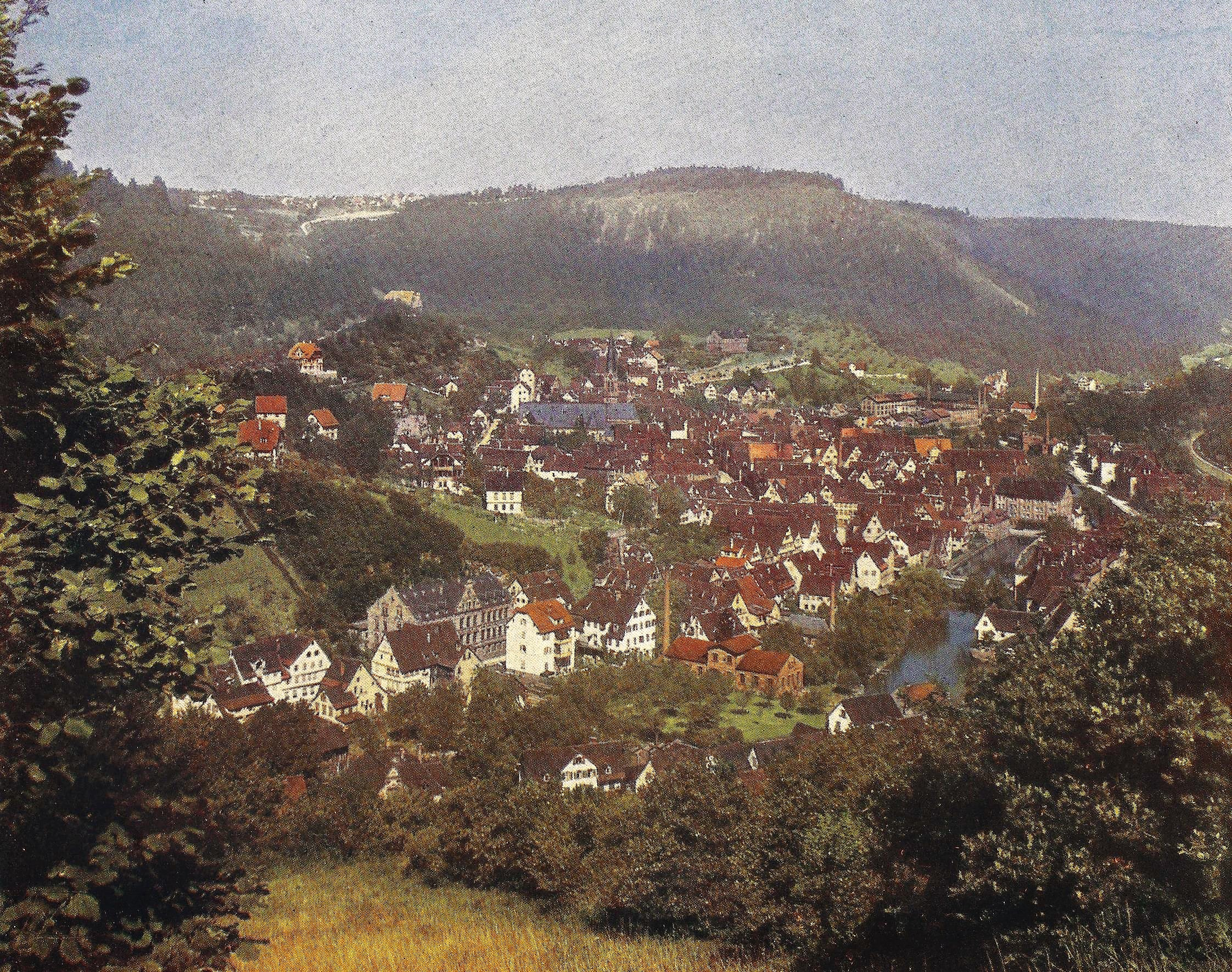
Calw in 1910.

In 1945, a small subcamp of Natzweiler-Struthof concentration camp, where parts for aircraft were assembled by female Jewish forced laborers, was located here.

After the World War II, Calw fell into the French zone of occupation and thus came to the newly founded state of Württemberg-Hohenzollern in 1947. In 1952, the provisional post-war state in the administrative region of South Württemberg-Hohenzollern merged and has since belonged to the new state of Baden-Württemberg.

The most prominent resident of Calw was the author and Nobel prize winner Hermann Hesse.

The district reform of 1 January 1973 gave the district of Calw its current size. It became a part of the newly founded Northern Black Forest Region, which itself was assigned to the administrative region of Karlsruhe. On 1 January 1975, Calw was combined with the communities of Altburg, Hirsau and Stammheim into the town of Calw-Hirsau. On 1 January 1976, the combined municipality was renamed as Calw.

=== Religious history ===
Calw was originally part of the Roman Catholic Diocese of Speyer. From 1534, in Calw as in the rest of the Duchy of Württemberg, the Reformation took force. In 1555, Calw became the seat of a deanery, which still exists today. The Deanery of Calw encompasses 43 congregations of the Evangelical-Lutheran Church in Württemberg. In the town of Calw there is the greater congregation of Calw, comprising the town-centre congregation (Calw Stadtkirche), the Bergkirche congregation of Wimberg/Alzenberg, and the Versöhnungskirche congregation of Heumaden, of which the last two came into existence only after the arrival of Heimatvertriebene after World War II. There are also congregations in the villages of Altburg, Hirsau, Holzbronn und Stammheim.

There is also a congregation of the United Methodist Church, an independent Protestant church, in Calw.

In the 19th century, Catholics returned to Calw. In 1885–1886, they founded the parish of St. Josef, which later became the seat of a deanery within the diocese of Rottenburg (today Rottenburg-Stuttgart). The parish of St. Josef covers the entire territory of the town as well as several surrounding communities.

The New Apostolic Church is represented in Calw and in the villages or hamlets of Heumaden, Holzbronn, and . A congregation of Seventh-day Adventists was founded in Calw in 1914.

=== Population ===
Populations within the town limits of Calw as defined for each date; the numbers are estimates or census results of the respective statistical agencies (by primary residence):

Data sources: census results (¹) or data from statistical offices

Year/Date	Inhabitants
1525	approx 1,500
1622	2,545
1702	1,896
1803	3,199
1849	4,529
1 December 1871	5,582
1 December 1880 ¹	4,662
1 December 1890 ¹	4,522
1 December 1900 ¹	4,943
1 December 1910 ¹	5,595
16 June 1925 ¹	5,681
16 June 1933 ¹	5,478
17 May 1939 ¹	6,160

Year/Date	Inhabitants
1946	6,795
13 September 1950 ¹	7,416
6 June 1961 ¹	9,690
27 May 1970 ¹	13,075
31 December 1975	21,561
31 December 1980	23,165
27 May 1987 ¹	21,018
31 December 1990	22,668
31 December 1995	23,709
31 December 2000	23,357
31 December 2005	23,828
31 December 2010	23,230
31 December 2015	23,232

== Politics ==
=== Municipal council ===
Since the municipal elections of 7 June 2009 the municipal council of Calw has had a total of thirty members (previously there were only twenty-seven). The Lord Mayor (in German "Oberbürgermeister") has a votes and acts as the chairperson of the council. The municipal election of 25 May 2014 yielded these results:

Party	Percentage of votes	+ / -	Seats	+ / -
Free Voters	33.0%	2.7	10	-1
Christian Democratic Union	20.4%	3.0	6	1
Social Democratic Party	13.7%	0.3	4	± 0
Neue Liste Calw	17.3%	+ 9.8	5	+ 3
Gemeinsam für Calw	15.7%	+ 15.7	5	+ 5

=== Mayor ===
By the 15th century, Calw had an electoral system that chose a new mayor (Bürgermeister) every two years. Proof exists for a council as far back as 1453. Since its elevation to the rank of a große Kreisstadt in 1976, the mayor has carried the title of Oberbürgermeister (Lord Mayor). An elected deputy mayor carries the title Bürgermeister.

==== Mayors and lord mayors ====
- 1799–1802: Ernst Friedrich Wagner
- 1802–1809: Ernst Bernhard Wagner
- 1809–1817: Johann Gottfried Konrad und Johann Naschold
- 1817–1820: Carl Friedrich von Gärtner
- 1820–1826: Johann Jakob Hess
- 1826–1835: Johann Friedrich Dreiß
- 1835–1884: Christian Friedrich Schuldt
- 1884–1902: Hermann Haffner
- 1902–1918: Eduard Conz
- 1918–1946: Otto Göhner
- 1946–1948: Oskar Blessing
- 1948–1965: Reinhold Seeber
- 1965–1991: Karl-Heinz Lehmann
- 1991–1998: Herbert Karl
- 1999–2003: Werner Spec (no party)
- 2003–2011: Manfred Dunst (Free Voters)
- 2011–2019: Ralf Eggert (no party)
- since 2019: Florian Kling (SPD)

=== Coat of arms ===
The coat of arms of the town of Calw shows a red lion with a blue tongue and blue crown standing atop a blue hill with three ridges, all against a golden background. The town flag is red-gold. The lion on the three-ridged hill is the coat of arms of the counts of Calw, the former lords of the town. The coat of arms has been used for centuries and was reapproved for use by the state government when the town was expanded in 1976.

== Economy ==
More than 8,000 people are employed in Calw, of which more than 5,200 work in the service sector and around 2,700 in the goods-producing sector.

== Transport ==
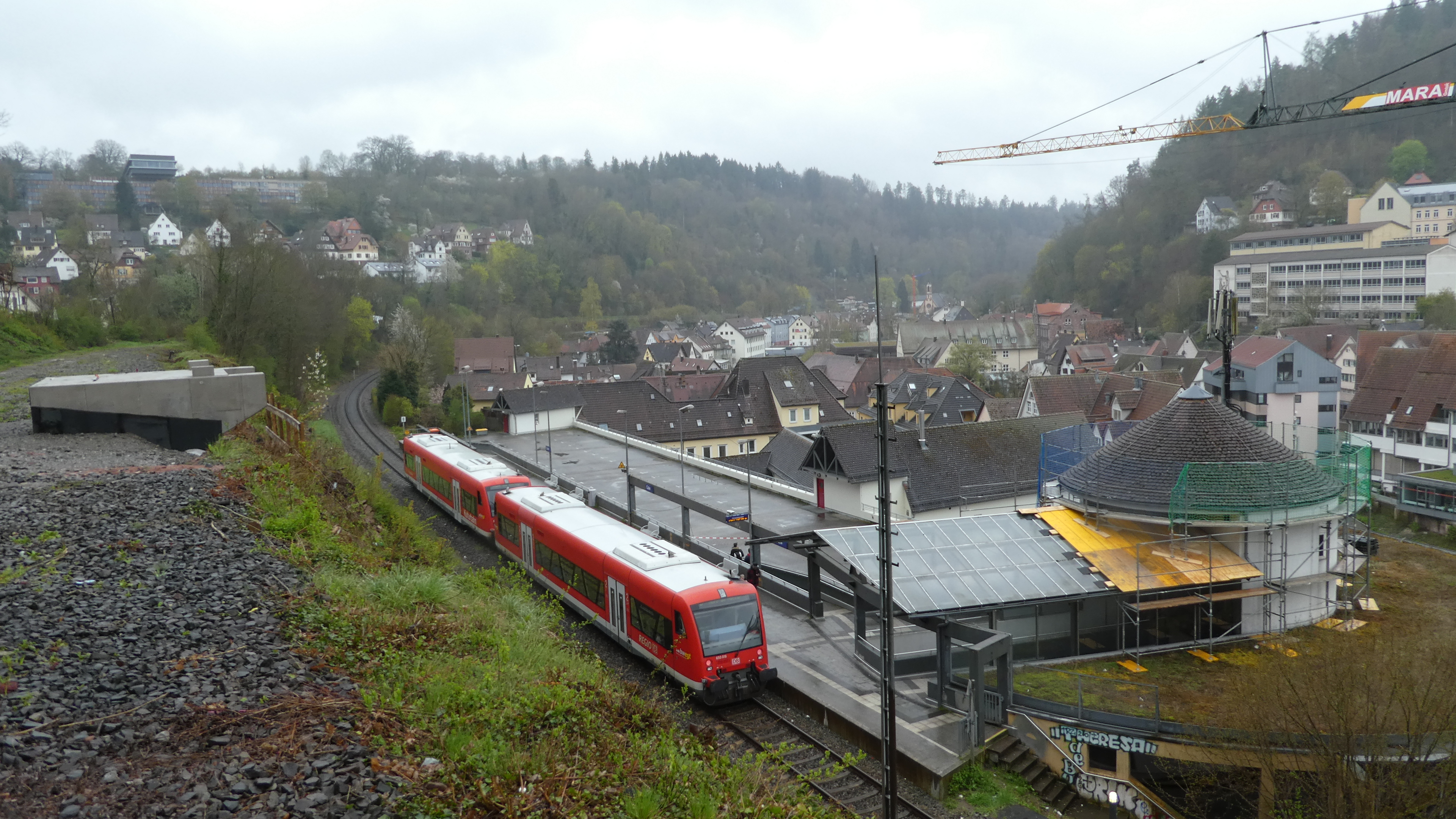
DB Regio class 650 train on a RB74 service in Calw station overlooking the town

SWEG battery train on the first RB76 service at Calw station on reopening day (1 February 2026)

Calw is served by two railway lines, the Nagold Valley Railway to Pforzheim, Nagold and Horb, and the Black Forest Railway (also known as Hermann Hesse Railway) to Weil der Stadt. Both railway lines are served by Regionalbahn services, which run every 30 minutes and every 60 minutes on weekends: RB 74 operated by DB Regio Baden-Württemberg on the Nagold Valley Railway, and RB 76 operated by SWEG on the Hermann Hesse Railway. Both lines meet at Calw station, which has been located next to the central bus terminal since 1989, RB 74 trains also stop in the suburb of Hirsau. The former Calw junction station on the southern outskirts of town is no longer used for passenger services. The railway through Calw first opened in 1872, when the line from Stuttgart via Weil der Stadt to Nagold opened. In 1874, the connection from Calw to Pforzheim followed. The line from Calw to Weil der Stadt was closed between 1983 and 2026.

Various bus services are operated in Calw by a number of bus operators under the umbrella of Verkehrsgesellschaft Bäderkreis Calw (VGC). Important regional bus links co-funded by the state are routes 670 to Weil der Stadt, 770 to Herrenberg and X63 to Bad Wildbad and Bad Herrenalb.

Calw is served by Bundesstraßen (federal highways) 295, 296 und 463. Climbing out of the Nagold valley toward Stuttgart, Bundesstraße 296 has two lanes. This 2.7 km section thereby makes it possible to pass slower vehicles in two switchbacks.

== Government and military ==
Calw is the seat of the district council of Calw District. There is also a tax office a local court, which belongs to the judicial districts of the state court Tübingen and of the superior state court of Stuttgart.

The Kommando Spezialkräfte (Special Operations Forces) of the German Army has been stationed since 1996 in the Graf Zeppelin barracks (Graf-Zeppelin-Kaserne) near Heumaden in Calw.

== Culture, art, and tourism ==
Calw has a small historic centre that was largely untouched by the wars of the 20th century. Many guests visit the town's marketplace and the Nikolausbrücke (a historic bridge). Calw has begun catering to the tourist trade, with numerous shops, restaurants, bistros and ice-cream parlours.

In the 1970s part of the historic centre was replaced with a shopping centre. Soon after, the town centre was closed off and established as a pedestrian zone. Buildings with exposed concrete (bus station, parking garage) have marked the part of the town centre facing the Nagold for years. A shopping centre built around 2000 borders the historic centre to the north.

One of the cultural high points of the calendar in Calw is the Calw Hermann Hesse Prize. Every other year it honors literary journals and translators that have focused on the work of Hermann Hesse. In the Hermann Hesse Colloquium, current issues having to do with Hermann Hesse are discussed in Calw by international experts. Every year in the Benedictine ruins of the Monastery of St. Peter und Paul the theatre festival "Calwer Klostersommer in Hirsau" (Calw Monastery Summer in Hirsau) takes place. This replaced the Klosterspiele Hirsau (Monastery Plays of Hirsau), which were rich in tradition. Hermann Hesse's Gerbersau stories provide the material for the yearly "Gerbersauer Lesesommer“ (Gerbersau Reading Summer). Stories and anecdotes are read from more than three dozen stories and reflections of Hermann Hesse about life in Gerbersau, his literary pseudonym for Calw. A feature of the reading series is the frequent use of settings from Hesse's life. A cultural strength of the Hesse Town is music; worth mentioning are the Aurelius-Sängerknaben (Aurelius Boys' Choir), whose fame extends far beyond the borders of Baden-Württemberg. Further musical features include concert series in the Evangelical Lutheran Stadtkirche (Town Church) and in the St. Aurelius Church.

== Notable people ==
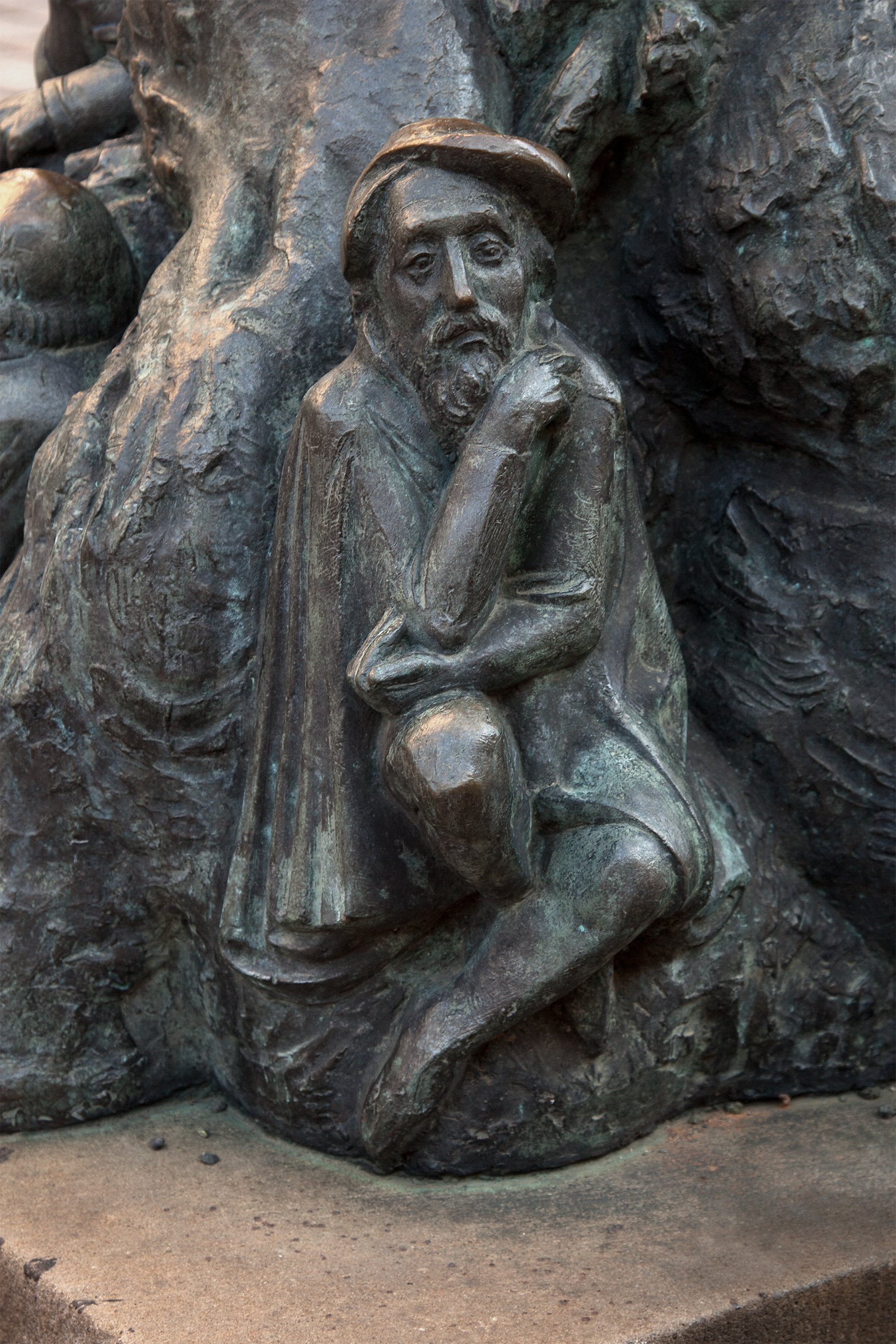
Ulrich Rülein von Calw by a fountain in Freiberg

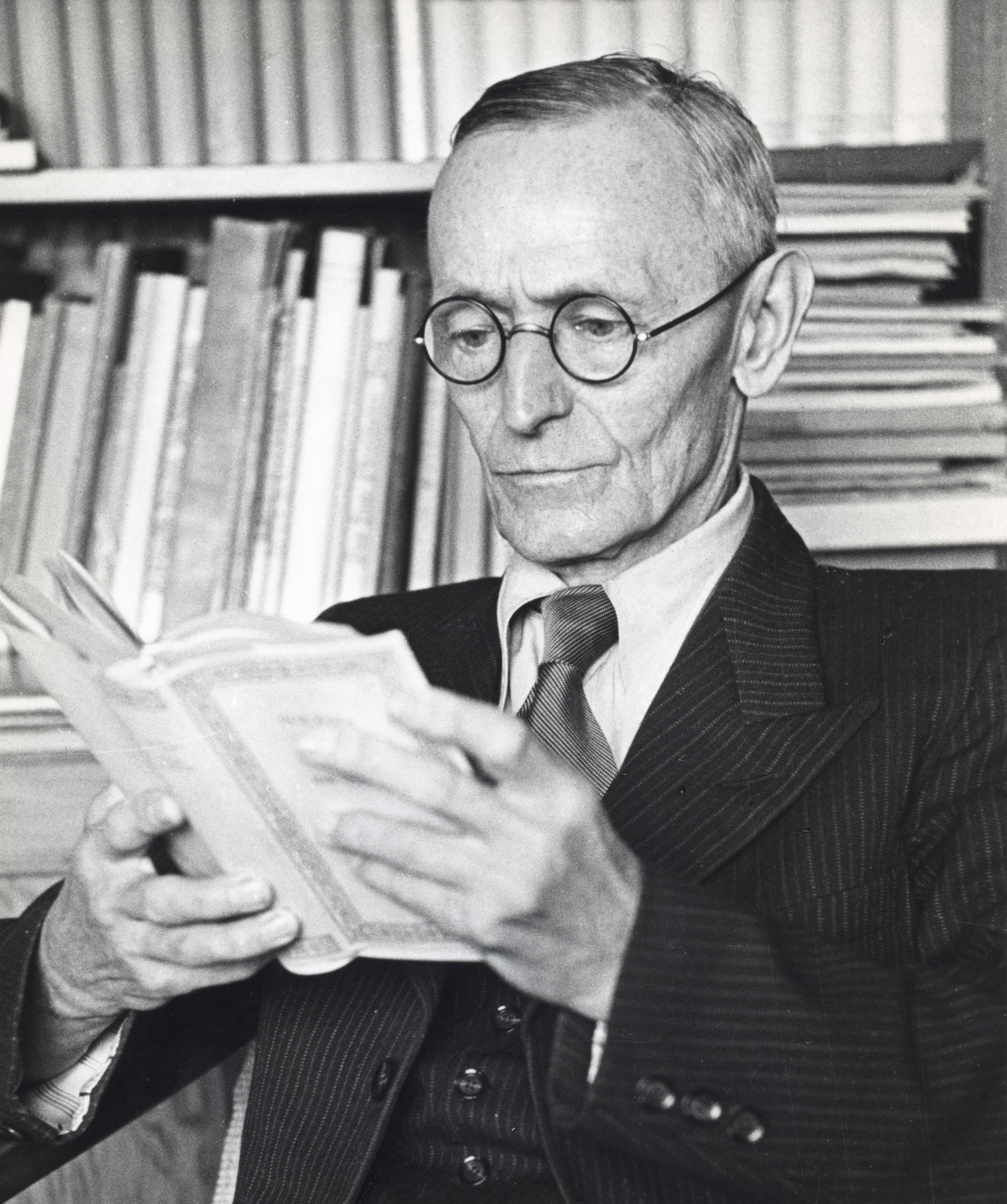
Hermann Hesse

- Johannes Valentinus Andreae (1586–1654), clergyman, linked to Rosicrucianism
- Gottfried von Calw (d.1131), Count Palatine of the Rhine, from 1113 to 1129
- Ulrich Rülein von Calw (1465–1523), doctor, mathematician, astrologer, town planner and mayor of Freiberg
- Joseph Gärtner (1732–1791), botanist, worked on seeds.
- Karl Friedrich von Gaertner (1772–1850), botanist, the son of Joseph Gaertner
- August Friedrich Gfrörer (1803–1861), historian and deputy of the Frankfurt National Assembly.
- Hermann Gundert (1814-1893), Indologist, translated Malayalam bible, grandfather of Herm.Hesse, died locally
- Hermann Hesse (1877–1962), Swiss poet, novelist and painter, winner of Nobel Prize in Literature in 1946
- Frank Hölzle (born 1968), professor of oral and maxillofacial surgery
- Peter Lehmann (born 1950), social scientist, honorary doctor of the University of Thessaloniki, Knight of the Federal Cross of Merit
- Jörg Lutz (born 1963), independent politician, mayor of Lörrach
- Silke Maier-Witt (born 1950), former member of the Red Army Faction, later became a trauma psychologist
- Konrad Rieger (1855–1939), psychiatrist
- Rudolf Schlichter (1890–1955), painter, engraver and writer.
- Heinz-Wolfgang Schnaufer (1922–1950), Luftwaffe night fighter pilot of WWII

=== Sport ===
- brothers Sascha Goc (born 1979), Marcel Goc (born 1983) & Nikolai Goc (born 1986), ice hockey players
- Chantal Hagel (born 1998), footballer, played 170 games and 13 for Germany women

== Twinnings ==
- Weida, Thuringia
- Latsch, South Tyrol, Italy

== Gallery ==
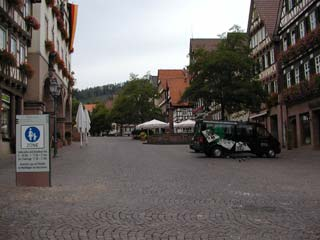

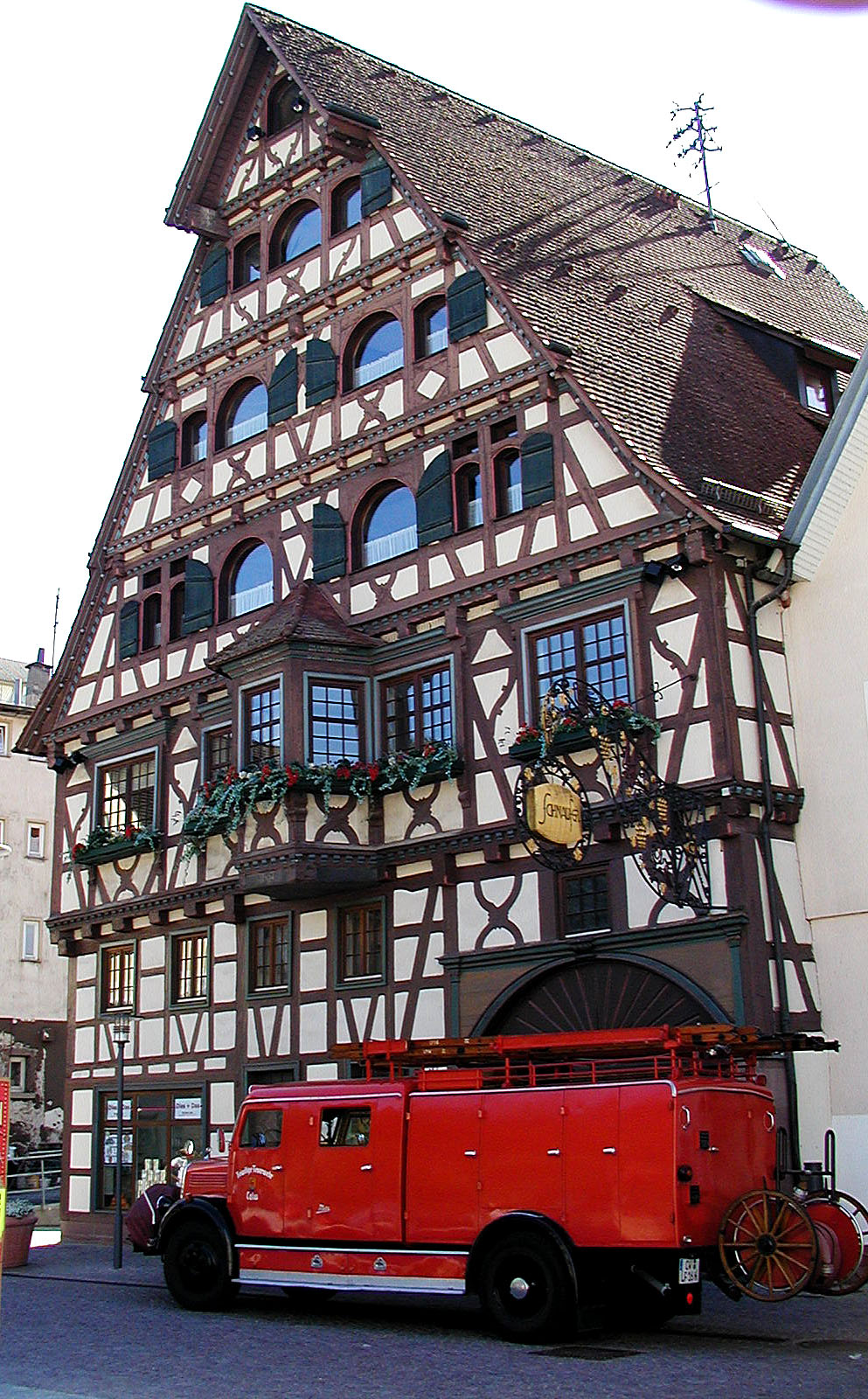

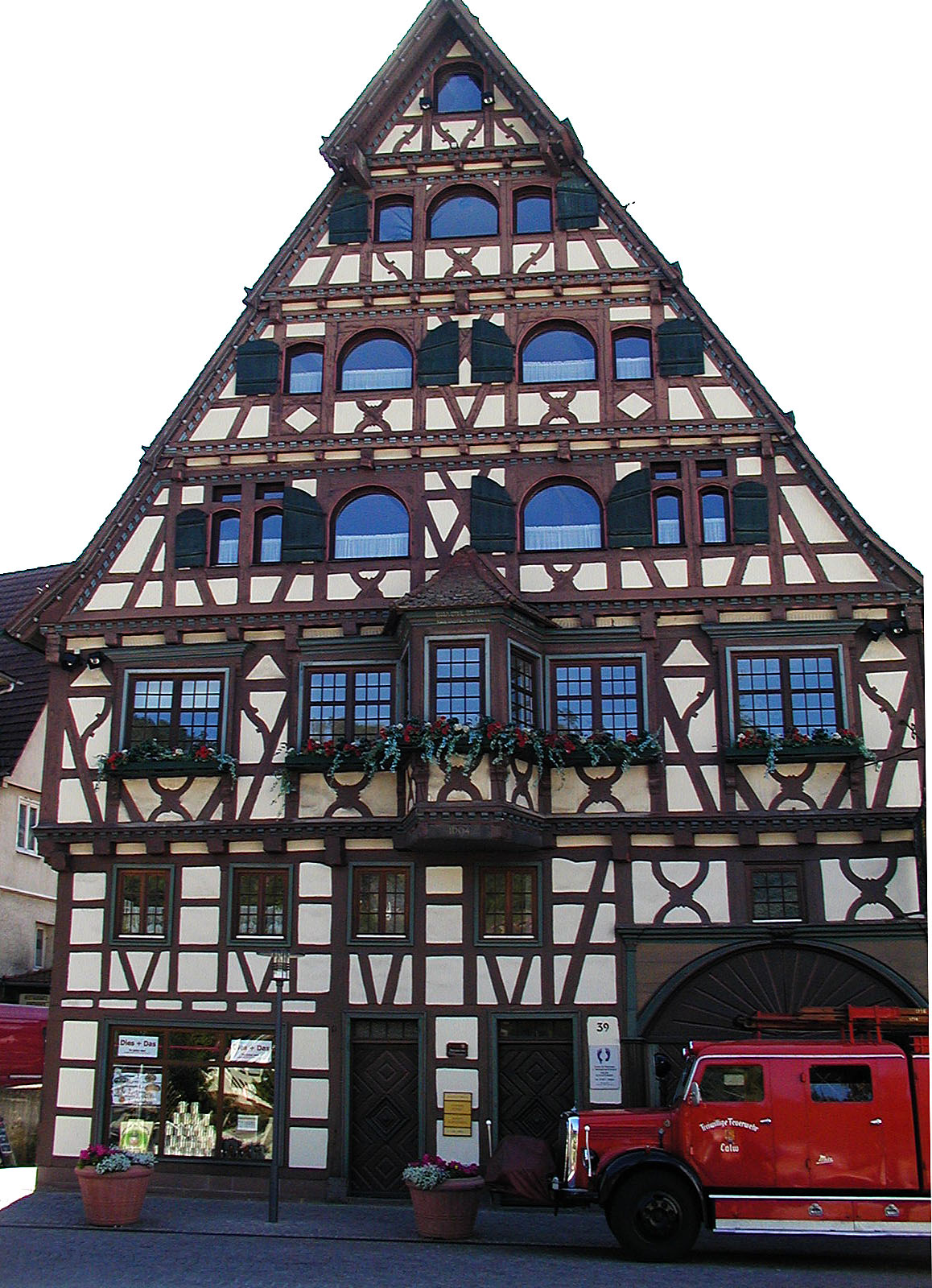

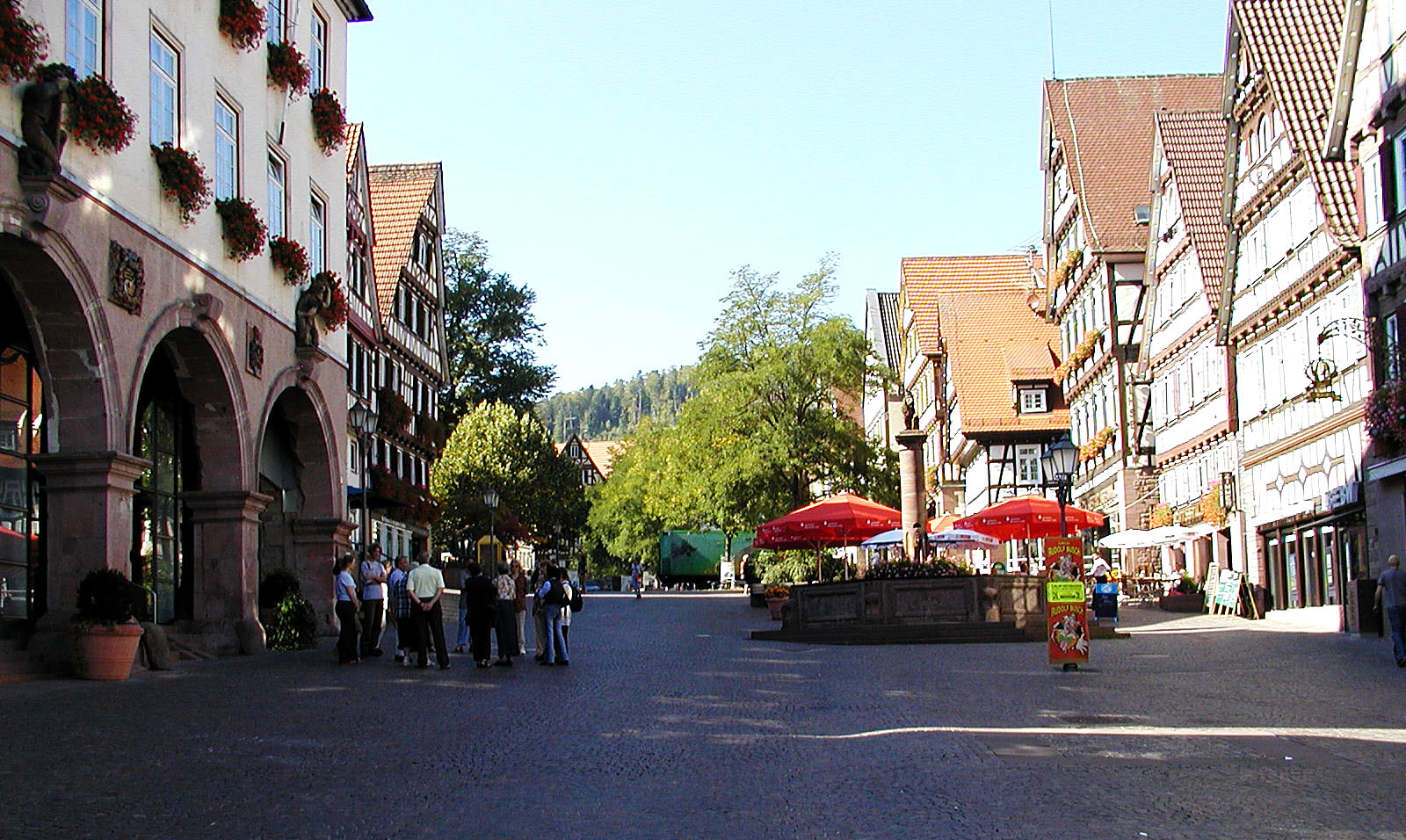

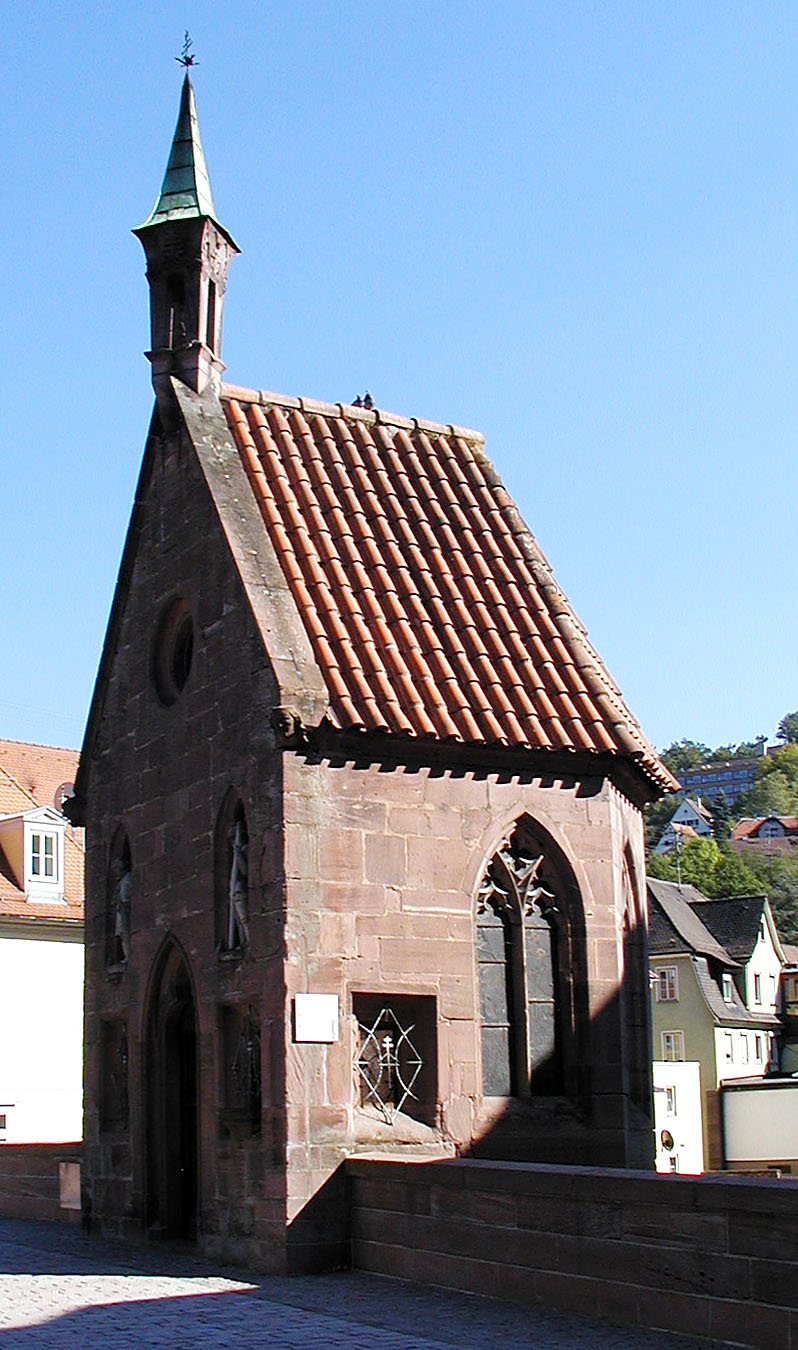

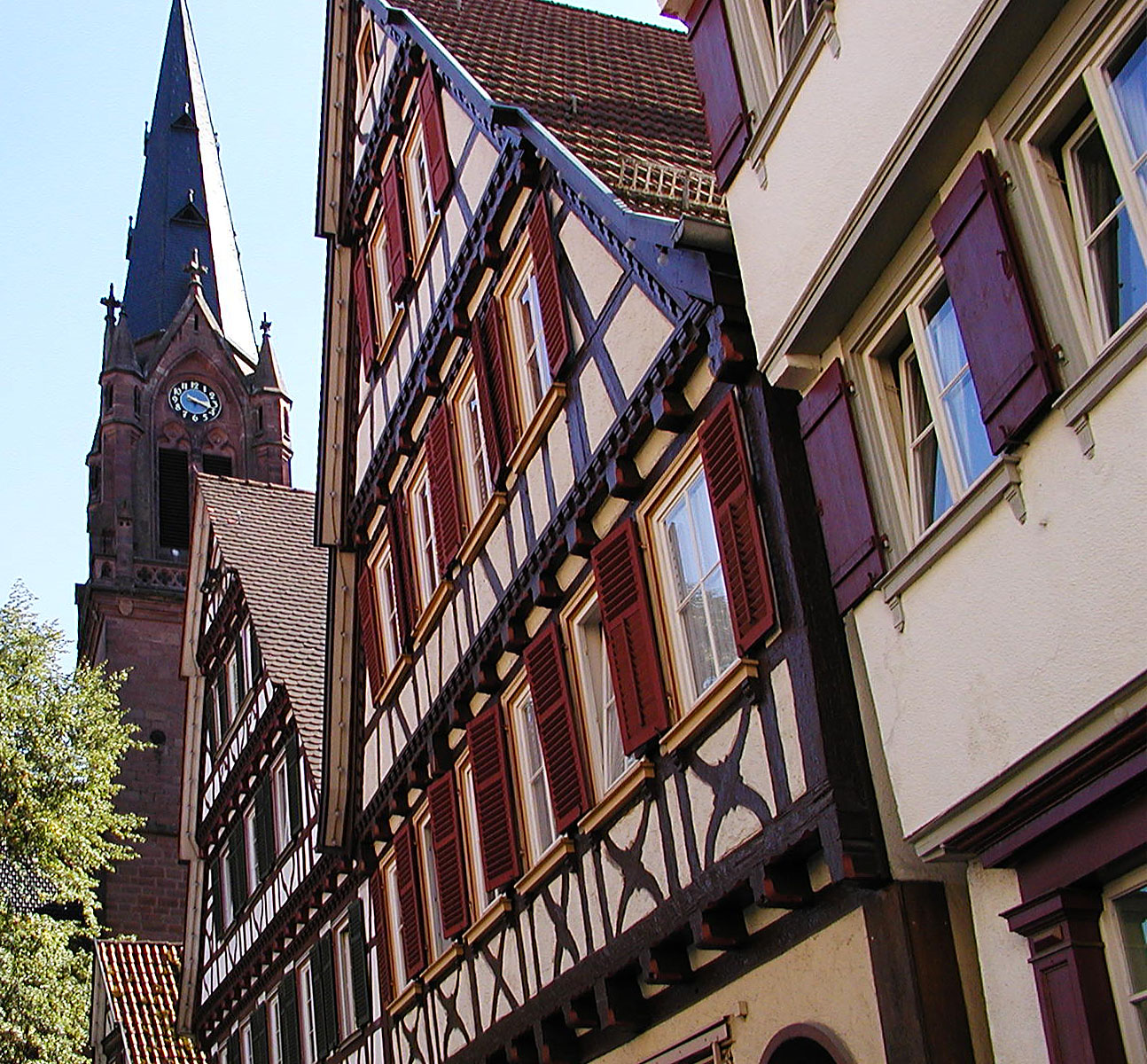

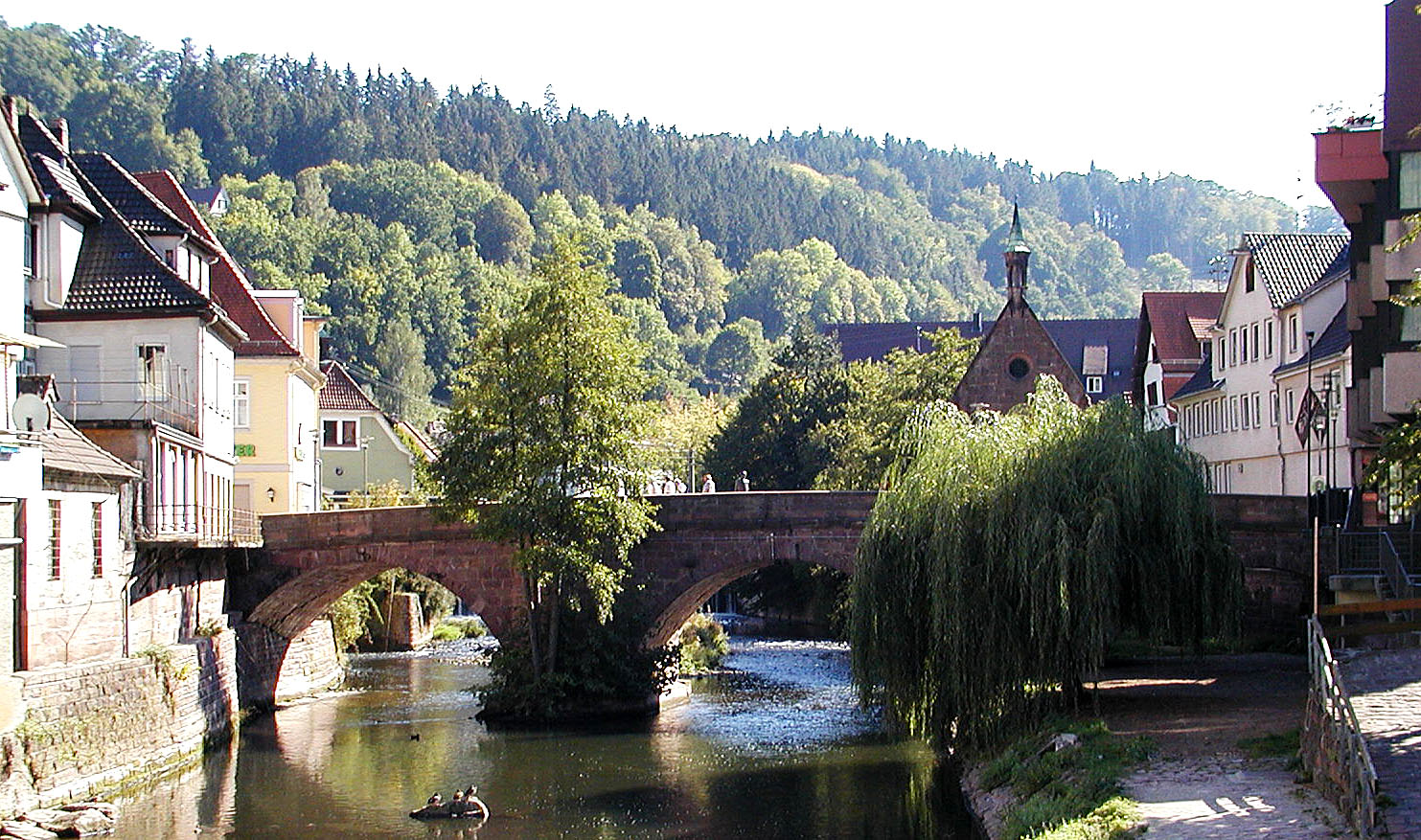
