= Ulrich Rülein von Calw =

German doctor, mathematician and mining engineer

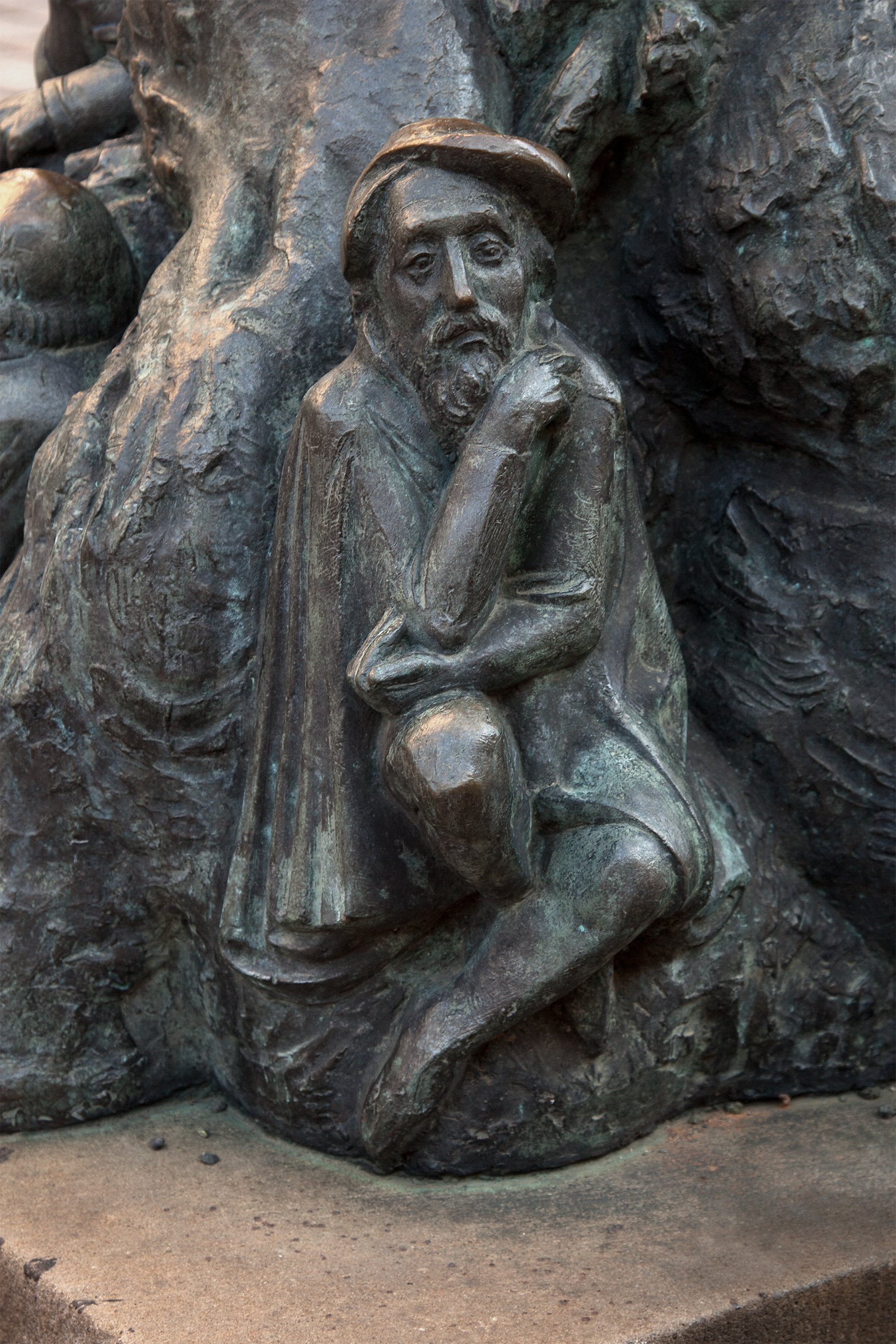
Ulrich Rülein von Calw, depicted on Freiberg's Fortuna Well

Ulrich Rülein von Calw (1465–1523) was a doctor, mathematician and well-known mining engineer. He was also active as a surveyor, town planner and astrologer and was the mayor (Bürgermeister) of the mining town of Freiberg for five years.

== Life ==
Rülein von Calw was born in 1465 in Calw. From 1485 he studied at the University of Leipzig. In 1490 he became a bachelor (baccalaureus) and Master of Arts (magister artium) and then went on to study medicine and mathematics. He was tasked by the Saxon prince-elector, George to build a "New Town on the Schreckenberg" (Neustadt am Schreckenberg), the present-day town of Annaberg. In 1497 Rülein von Calw was appointed by the town of Freiberg as town physician (Stadtphysikus). Here he acted as a survey and construction engineer, mining expert and astrologer. In 1505 his book Eyn wohlgeordnet und nützlich büchlein, wie man bergwerk suchen und finden soll ("A well-ordered and useful little book about how to seek and find mines") appeared in Augsburg, the first scientific treatment of mining in Germany. As a doctor he fought the Plague in 1497.

In 1508 he became a citizen of Freiberg, an alderman (Ratsherr) and from 1514 to 1519 the officiating Bürgermeister. Ulrich Rülein von Calw entered the Freiberg miners' guild in 1519, but left Freiberg in 1519 due to hostilities against his school in 1519 and went to Leipzig, where he worked as Professor of Medicine. His last job, the town planning of Marienberg was given to him in 1521 by Henry the Pious. He died in 1523 in Leipzig.

== Works ==
- Eyn wohlgeordnet und nützlich büchlein, wie man bergwerk suchen und finden soll, Augsburg, 1505
- Ein nützlich Bergbüchlin, Erfurt, 1527

== Sources ==
- Wilhelm Pieper: Ulrich Rülein von Calw und sein Bergbüchlein: mit Urtext-Faksimile und Übertragung des Bergbüchleins von etwa 1500 und Faksimile der Pestschrift von 1521. - Berlin : Akademie-Verlag, 1955. - 215 pp. - (Freiberger Forschungshefte; D 7)
