= Frank Hölzle =

German surgeon professor of oral and maxillofacial surgery

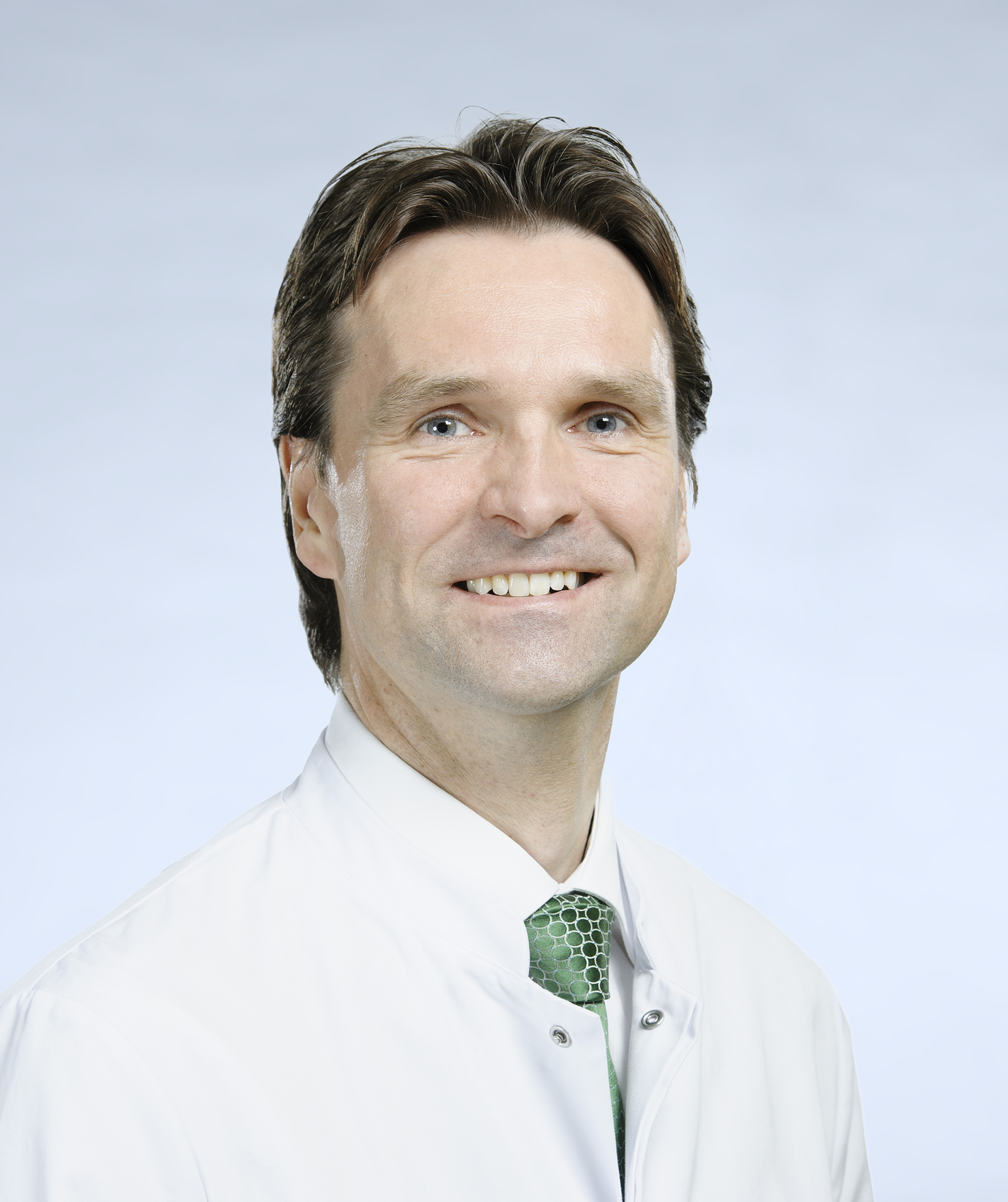
- Frank Hölzle, 2013
- Born: 13 February 1968 (age 58); Calw, Germany
- Known for: Plastic facial reconstruction with a focus on micro surgery
- Awards: Martin-Waßmund-Prize
- Scientific career
- Fields: Oral and maxillofacial surgery

Frank Hölzle (German pronunciation: [ˈhœltslɛ]; born 13 February 1968 in Calw) is a German surgeon. He is a professor of oral and maxillofacial surgery at the RWTH Aachen University. He is chairman and head of the Department of Oral and Maxillofacial Surgery. Hölzle is known for his work in the fields of plastic facial reconstruction with a focus on micro surgery. He is also specialised for the treatment of tumor diseases in the head and neck region, and of malformations like cleft lip and palate.

== Biography ==
Hölzle was born in Calw and grew up in the Black Forest. In Calw he was educated at the Herrmann-Hesse-Gymnasium. He studied medicine and dentistry at the Free University of Berlin, at the Humboldt University of Berlin, at the University of Glasgow and at the University College London Medical School from 1989 to 1998. He received his doctoral title in human medicine in 1995. In 1998, he was promoted to doctor of dentistry. From 1999 to 2000, Hölzle was a scientific employee at the Department of Oral and Maxillofacial Surgery at the University Hospital Charité, Campus Virchow Clinic, Berlin. Hölzle worked at the Department of Oral and Maxillofacial Surgery at the Knappschaftskrankenhaus Bochum-Langendreer at the Ruhr-University Bochum from 2000 to 2007, from 2004 as deputy director. In 2002, he received recognition as a medical specialist for oral and maxillofacial surgery and in Oral Surgery. In 2005 he achieved the additional qualification as a plastic and reconstructive face surgeon. In 2006, he received the venia legendi for oral and maxillofacial surgery. In the same year he became a Fellow of the European Board of Oral & Maxillofacial Surgeons (FEBOMFS, Barcelona). Between 1992 and 2010, Hölzle was influenced positively by Klaus-Dietrich Wolff, culminating at the Rechts der Isar Hospital of the Technical University of Munich. From 2007 to 2011, he was senior physician and deputy director of the Department of Oral and Maxillofacial Surgery at the Rechts der Isar Hospital of the Technical University of Munich. Since 2011 he has been a full professor and head of the Department of Oral and Maxillofacial Surgery at the University Hospital of the RWTH Aachen University.

== Scientific contribution ==
Hölzle worked on the following subjects:

- Analysis of the anatomy of microsurgical transplants and their vessel passages and histology
- microcirculation and ischemic preconditioning of microsurgical transplants
- Monitoring of microsurgical flaps
- Computer planning and surgical guides in microsurgical bone reconstruction
- Automation in microsurgical bone reconstruction and osteoplastic cranioplasty
- Experimental and clinical evaluation of zirconia dental implants

The research of microsurgical tissue transplants was a focus of Hölzle's scientific work. Scientific publications appeared on objectifying valuation of the viability of the transplanted tissue and on the monitoring of different compound composite flaps. Furthermore, Hölzle worked on micro circulatory characteristics of these transplants and with the phenomenon of the reperfusion injury. After the implementation of computer planning and surgical guides technique in microsurgical bone reconstruction, Hölzle dealt with the utilisation of meaningful clinical indications and improvement of these techniques. In Hölzle´s department of Oral and Maxillofacial Surgery the first computer planned, microsurgical and less invasive deep circumflex iliac artery flap was raised via a medial approach using cutting guides. Until then only the lateral approach has been described. In addition, he advanced the further development of automation in microsurgical bone flaps and their utilization also for osteoplastic cranioplasty.

== Memberships in international organisations ==
- Deutsche Gesellschaft für Mund-, Kiefer- und Gesichtschirurgie (DGMKG)
- Deutsche Gesellschaft für Zahn-, Mund- und Kieferheilkunde (DGZMK)
- Workgroup of Jaw Surgery within the DGZMK.
- Deutsche Gesellschaft für Plastische und Wiederherstellungschirurgie (DGPW)
- Interplast-Germany
- German Association of University Professors and Lecturers
- European Association for Cranio-Maxillofacial Surgery
  - 2012-2016 Councillor for Germany at EACMFS
  - 2018-2020 Executive Adviser EACMFS
  - 2020-2022 Liaison Officer EACMFS
- Union Européenne des Médecins Spécialistes (UEMS) in the EU
  - 2016-2018 Observer for Germany UEMS OMFS in Brussels (EU)
  - 2019-2023 Liaison Officer UEMS OMFS Section & Board in Brussels (EU)
- Deutsch-Österreichisch-Schweizerischer Arbeitskreis für Tumoren im Kiefer- und Gesichtsbereich (DÖSAK, International Cancer Organization)
  - 2016-2018 Executive Member
  - 2018-2020 President DÖSAK

== Honors and awards ==
- 2007 Winner of the Martin-Wassmund-Award (named after the Founder of the Society of Oral and Maxillofacial Surgery in Germany and highest OMFS Award in Germany) to dignify the research work "Monitoring and Improvement of the Perfusion of Microsurgical Flaps and Development of Retrograde Perfusion for Perforator Flaps in the Head and Neck"
- 2008 Scientific Award Journal of Cranio-Maxillofacial Surgery für „Top 10 Cited Papers 2006–2008“, second place
- 2009 Scientific Award Journal of Cranio-Maxillofacial Surgery, „Top 25 Hottest Articles“, third place
- 2013 Fellow of the International Team of Implantology, ITI Switzerland
- 2014 Award Medical Faculty of RWTH University Aachen for the best medical doctoral thesis and Borchers-Medal
- Numerous awards in teaching, inter alia > 10 Gold-Medals for the “Best Clinical Lecturer in Dentistry” at RWTH Aachen University

== Publications ==
Books

Hölzle is coeditor of three textbooks in the field of dental surgery and of oral and maxillofacial surgery:

- Klaus-Dietrich Wolff and Frank Hölzle (ed.): Raising of Microvascular Flaps: A Systematic Approach. Springer; 3rd ed. (2017)
- Jochen Jackowski, Hajo Peters und Frank Hölzle (ed.): Zahnärztliche Chirurgie. Springer (2017)
- Jochen Jackowski, Hajo Peters und Frank Hölzle (ed.): Praxisleitfaden Zahnärztliche Chirurgie. Urban & Fischer/Elsevier (2007)

Articles in scientific journals

Hölzle published more than 250 scientific peer reviewed papers. He presented > 400 scientific posters and presentations and raised > 4 Mio € for Research Grants. He organized and conducted > 100 national and international courses, workshops and meetings in the fields of flap raising, microsurgery, head & neck oncology and implantology. He educated > 1.000 medical doctors and dentists in reconstructive surgery and implantology since 1994.

- F. Hölzle, M. Klein, O. Schwerdtner, T. Lueth, J. Albrecht, N. Hosten, R. Felix, J. Bier: Intraoperative computed tomography with the mobile CT Tomoscan M during surgical treatment of orbital floor fractures. Int J Oral Maxillofac Surg. (2001) 30: 26–31.
- F. Hölzle, K.-D. Wolff: Anatomic position of the lingual nerve in the mandibular third molar region with special consideration of an atrophied mandibular crest: An anatomical study. Int J Oral Maxillofac Surg. (2001) 30: 333–338.
- F. Hölzle, D. Löffelbein, D. Nolte, K.-D. Wolff: Free flap monitoring using simultaneous non-invasive laser Doppler flowmetry and tissue spectrophotometry. J Craniomaxillofac Surg. (2006) 34: 25–33.
- F. Hölzle, K.-D. Wolff, C. Mohr: Reconstructive oral and maxillofacial surgery. Dtsch Ärztebl Int. (2008) 47: 815–22.
- F. Hölzle, A. Rau, D. J. Loeffelbein, M. R. Kesting, T. Mücke, K.-D. Wolff: Results of monitoring fasciocutaneous, myocutaneous, osteocutaneous and perforator flaps: 4-year experience with 166 cases. Int J Oral Maxillofac Surg. (2010) 37: 21–28.
- A. Modabber, S.C. Möhlhenrich, N. Ayoub, M. Hajji, S. Raith, S. Reich, T. Steiner, A. Ghassemi, F. Hölzle: Computer-Aided Mandibular Reconstruction with Vascularized Iliac Crest Bone Flap and Simultaneous Implant Surgery. J Oral Implantol. (2014)
- A. Modabber, N. Ayoub, A. Bock, S.C. Möhlhenrich, B. Lethaus, A. Ghassemi, D.A. Mitchell, F. Hölzle: Medial approach for minimally-invasive harvesting of a deep circumflex iliac artery flap for reconstruction of the jaw using virtual surgical planning and CAD/CAM technology. Br J Oral Maxillofac Surg. (2017) 55: 946-951.
- S. Raith, A. Rauen, S.C. Möhlhenrich, N. Ayoub, F. Peters, T. Steiner, F. Hölzle, A. Modabber: Introduction of an algorithm for planning of autologous fibular transfer in mandibular reconstruction based on individual bone curvatures. Int J Med Robot. (2018) 14 doi: 10.1002/rcs.1894
- A. Modabber, A. Rauen, N. Ayoub, S.C. Möhlhenrich, F. Peters, K. Kniha, F. Hölzle, S. Raith: Evaluation of a novel algorithm for automating virtual surgical planning in mandibular reconstruction using fibula flaps. J Craniomaxillofac Surg. (2019) 47:1378-1386
