= Schießbach (Saale) =

River in Germany

Location
- Country: Germany
- State: Bavaria

Physical characteristics
- Mouth
  - location: Saale
  - coordinates: 50°24′05″N 11°48′58″E

Schießbach is a river of Bavaria, Germany. It is a left tributary of the Saale near Hirschberg.

== See also ==
- List of rivers of Bavaria
