= Tälesbach =

River in Germany

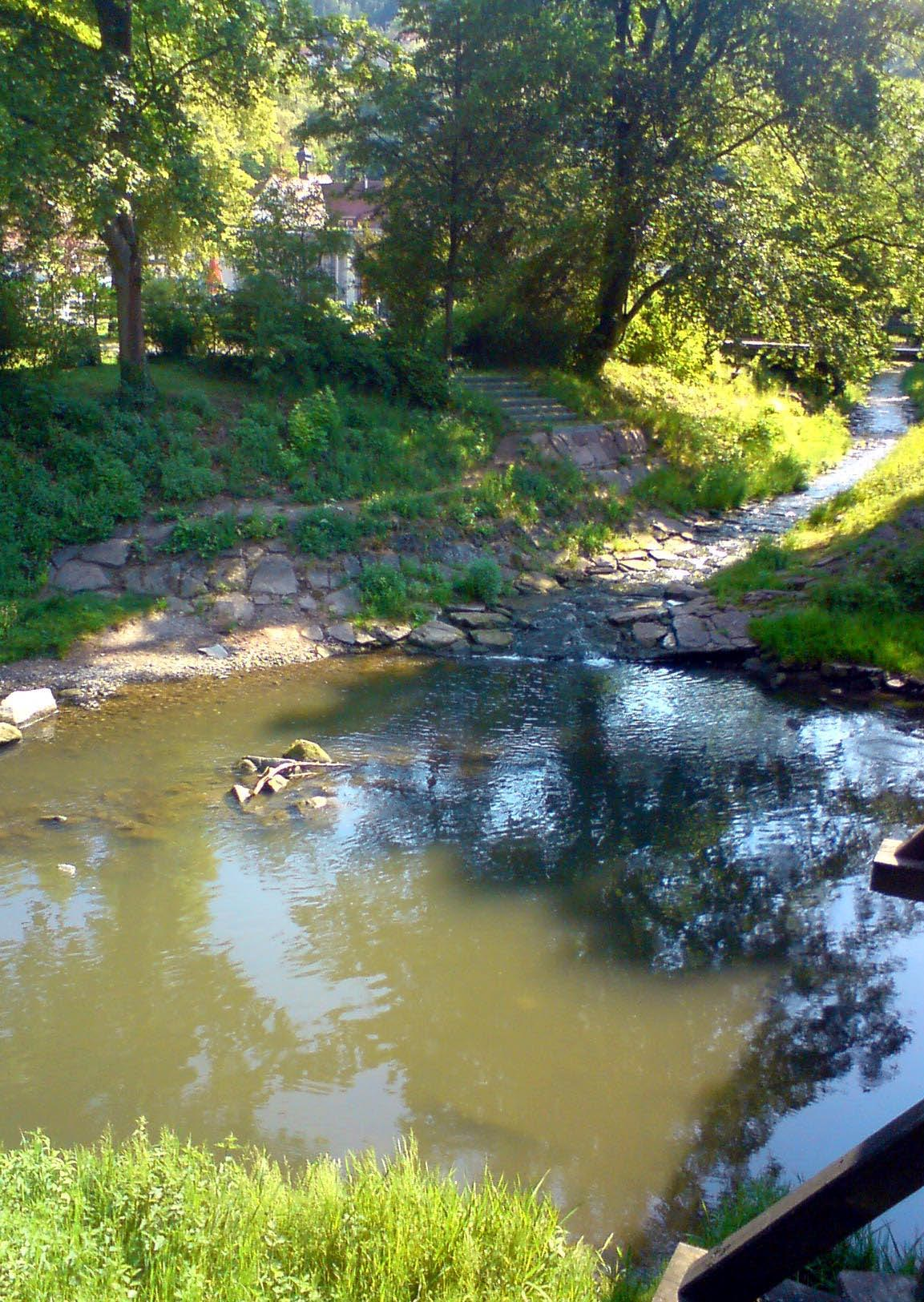

Location
- Country: Germany
- State: Baden-Württemberg

Physical characteristics
- Mouth
  - location: Nagold
  - coordinates: 48°44′01″N 8°44′00″E

Basin features
- Progression: Nagold→ Enz→ Neckar→ Rhine→ North Sea

Tälesbach is a small river of Baden-Württemberg, Germany. It flows into the Nagold near Calw.

== See also ==
- List of rivers of Baden-Württemberg
