= Korntal station =

Railway station in Korntal-Münchingen, Germany

Korntal
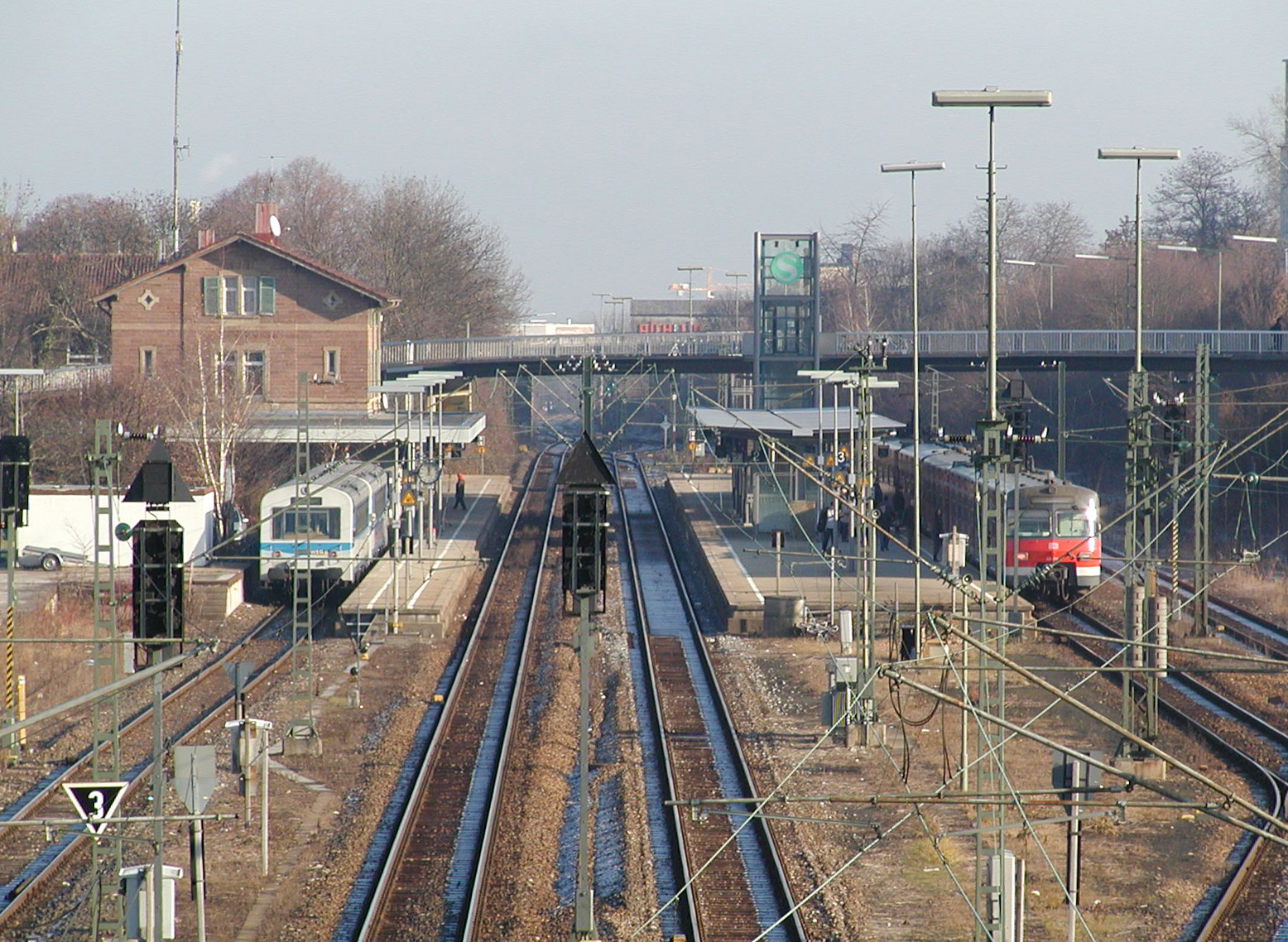

General information
- Location: Bahnhofplatz 1, Korntal-Münchingen, Baden-Württemberg; Germany
- Coordinates: 48°49′34″N 9°7′16″E
- Owner: Deutsche Bahn
- Operator: DB Netz; DB Station&Service
- Lines: Black Forest Railway (KBS 790.6); Strohgäu Railway (KBS 790.61)
- Platforms: 4 (3 regularly used)

Construction
- Accessible: Yes

Other information
- Station code: 3377
- DS100 code: TKO
- Category: 4
- Fare zone: : 1 and 2
- Website: www.bahnhof.de

History
- Opened: 23 September 1868

Services
Preceding station	Württembergische Eisenbahn-Gesellschaft	Following station
Korntal Gymnasium towards Heimerdingen	RB 47	Terminus
Preceding station	Stuttgart S-Bahn	Following station
Neuwirtshaus (Porscheplatz) towards Schwabstraße	S6	Weilimdorf towards Weil der Stadt
Neuwirtshaus (Porscheplatz) towards Schwabstraße	S60	Weilimdorf towards Böblingen
Location

Korntal station is in the town of Korntal-Münchingen in the German state of Baden-Württemberg. It is on the Württemberg Black Forest railway, which is served by the Stuttgart S-Bahn network. It is the starting point of the Strohgäu Railway (German: Strohgäubahn), which is served by the Württembergische Eisenbahn-Gesellschaft (Württemberg Railway Company).

== History ==
The Evangelische Brüdergemeinde Kornthal (Evangelical United Brethren of Kornthal) had about 600 inhabitants in the 1860s. The church's estate in Kornthal had been very small district since the Pietist community was founded in 1819. Many of its residents worked away from the community and took advantage of the opening of the Zuffenhausen station on the Württemberg Central Railway in 1846.

When the parliament of Württemberg decided to build the Black Forest Railway through the Strohgäu district on 13 August 1865, it was not certain that a station would be established in Korntal. In fact, the citizens of the larger community of Weil im Dorf petitioned the royal government for a station on the line so as not to be economically disadvantaged.

On 23 September 1868, the Royal Württemberg State Railways (Königlich Württembergischen Staats-Eisenbahnen) opened Kornthal station as the only station between Zuffenhausen and Ditzingen at that time; it was later called Kornthal-Weil im Dorf. The two-storey red sandstone entrance building still exists. During the reform in 1904, when the spelling of thal (valley) was changed to tal, the name of the village and the station name changed to Korntal-Weil im Dorf.

From 1898, several municipalities called for the construction of a railway line between Zuffenhausen or Ludwigsburg through the northern Heckengäu towards Pforzheim. The railway committee soon abandoned Pforzheim as the endpoint of the line. Similarly Münchingen would not be served if the line started in Ludwigsburg. To economise Korntal was chosen as the starting point of the line. On 13 August 1906, the Württemberg Railway Company opened its Strohgäu branch line to Weissach.

On 30 December 1926, the Feuerbach Municipal Tramway (Städtische Straßenbahn Feuerbach) was opened from Feuerbach to Gerlingen. This allowed passengers to and from Weil im Dorf a more comfortable way to travel and spared them a long walk. As a result, there was a reduction in passenger numbers at Korntal station. The station's name was changed from Korntal-Weil im Dorf to Korntal. On 1 December 1937, Deutsche Reichsbahn completed the duplication of the section between Zuffenhausen and Korntal. Electrification from Zuffenhausen to Leonberg was completed on 15 May 1939.

After the Second World War, Korntal finally developed into a residential suburb of Stuttgart. On 30 June 1958, the Interior Ministry gave the municipality a city charter. There were now over 8,000 residents in the former Evangelical United Brethren community.

In May 1962, the traffic engineer Professor Walter Lambert delivered a plan to the Stuttgart City Council for an S-Bahn network for the city. It would include the Stuttgart–Weil der Stadt electric suburban service established in 1940. In October 1978, Deutsche Bundesbahn implemented this concept with the launch of S-Bahn line S 6. The Strohgäu Railway has, on the other hand, been constantly threatened with closure due to lack of passengers. Its electrification and integration into Stuttgart Stadtbahn network was planned at one time. The line has survived as a result of investments by the districts of Ludwigsburg and Böblingen.

== Rail operations ==
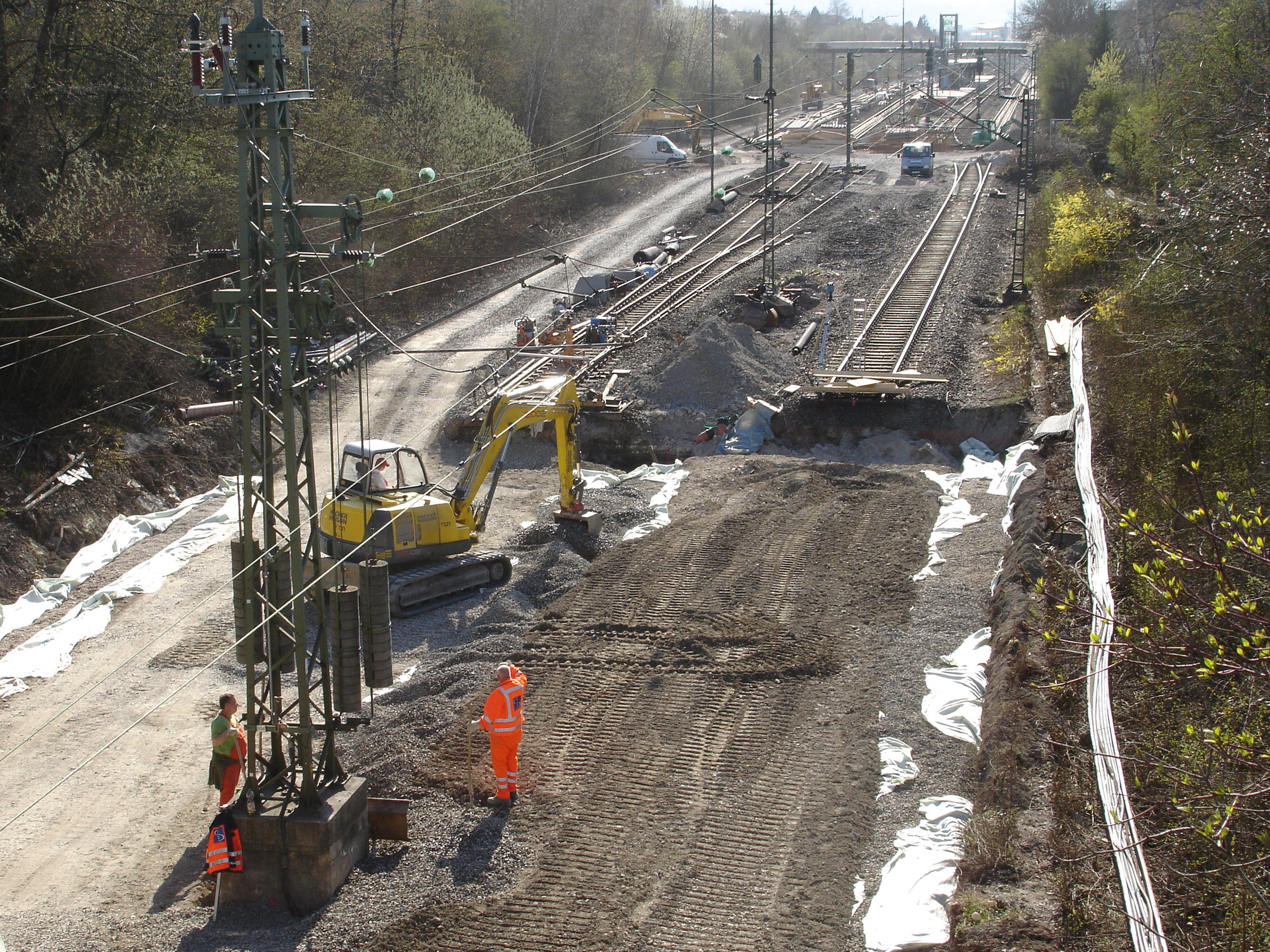
Rail construction in spring 2010

The station is served by trains of lines S 6 and S 60 of the Stuttgart S-Bahn and the Württemberg Railway Company (Württembergische Eisenbahn-Gesellschaft, WEG). The S-Bahn towards Leonberg stops on track 1, the “home” platform and, in the peak hour, it is also used by WEG trains on their way from Feuerbach towards Hemmingen. Track 2 is used by non-stopping trains. Track 3 is used by S-Bahn trains and, in the peak hour, by WEG trains running towards Zuffenhausen. Platform 4 has no platform and is also used by non-stopping trains. Track 7 is a bay platform, which is connected to the home platform. WEG trains start here towards Hemmingen.

The station is classified by Deutsche Bahn as a category 4 station.

Line	Route
S 6	Weil der Stadt – Renningen – Leonberg – Korntal – Zuffenhausen – Hauptbahnhof – Schwabstraße (additional services in the peak between Leonberg and Schwabstraße)
S 60	Böblingen – Sindelfingen – Magstadt – Renningen – Leonberg – Korntal – Zuffenhausen – Hauptbahnhof – Schwabstraße

=== Regional services ===
Line	Route
RB 47	(Feuerbach – Zuffenhausen –) Korntal – Hemmingen – Heimerdingen – Weissach
