= Ditzingen station =

Railway station in Ditzingen, Germany

Ditzingen
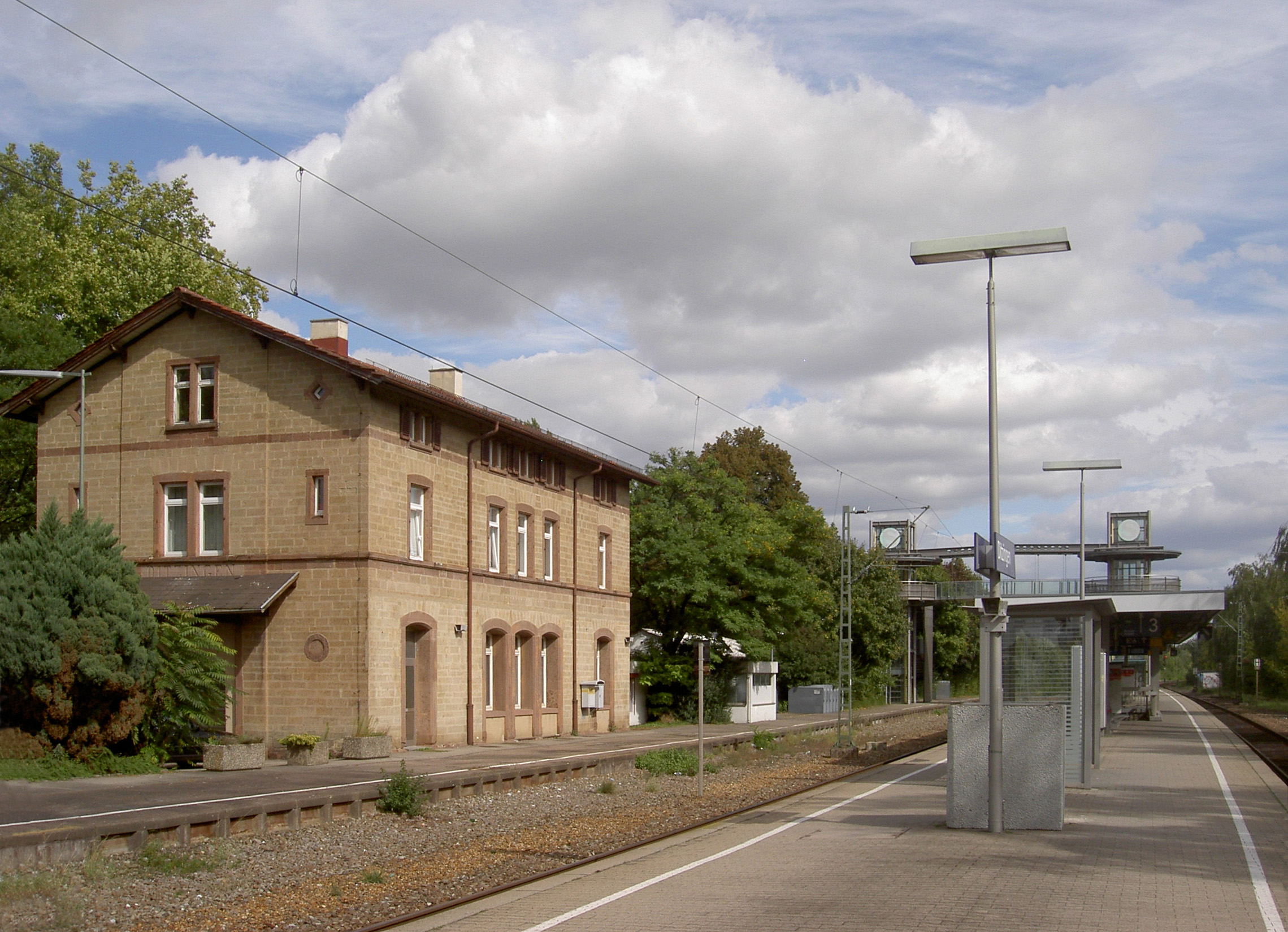

General information
- Location: Ditzingen, Baden-Württemberg; Germany
- Coordinates: 48°49′25″N 9°4′1″E
- Lines: Black Forest Railway (Württemberg) (KBS 790.6)
- Platforms: 2

Construction
- Accessible: Yes

Other information
- Station code: 1234
- DS100 code: TDI
- IBNR: 8001476
- Category: 4
- Fare zone: : 2 and 3
- Website: www.bahnhof.de

History
- Opened: 23 September 1868

Services
Preceding station	Stuttgart S-Bahn	Following station
Weilimdorf towards Schwabstraße	S6	Höfingen towards Weil der Stadt
Weilimdorf towards Schwabstraße	S60	Höfingen towards Böblingen
Location

Ditzingen station is in the town of Ditzingen in the German state of Baden-Württemberg, 7.7 kilometres from the start of the Württemberg Black Forest railway at Zuffenhausen and is part of the Stuttgart S-Bahn network.

== History ==
When, in 1865, the parliament of Württemberg decided to build a railway line through the Glems district, a connection to Ditzingen was regarded as assured. Running the line through Ditzingen was geographically convenient for the railway and, in addition, several influential aristocrats lived and managed their estates in the Ditzingen area. The line would expand the market for their goods in Stuttgart.

The line branched off the Northern Railway (German: Nordbahn) in Zuffenhausen and, on 23 September 1868, the first regular train reached Ditzingen station, 300 metres south of the village. The continuation of the line to Leonberg was delayed due to the need for extensive earthworks. The two-storey sandstone station building has been preserved.

The new form of transport was used by very few local residents. Ditzingen remained dominated by agriculture. Each day servants of Hemmingen manor delivered milk and sent it to Stuttgart for sale. This led to the line being called the Milchbahn (milk line).

On 1 December 1869, the Royal Württemberg State Railways completed the next section of the Black Forest Railway and trains ran on to Weil der Stadt.

The population was now increasing. But the establishment of factories in the town only became significant in the early 20th century. In 1910, the population of the community increased for the first time to over 2,000 people, 113 of whom worked elsewhere.

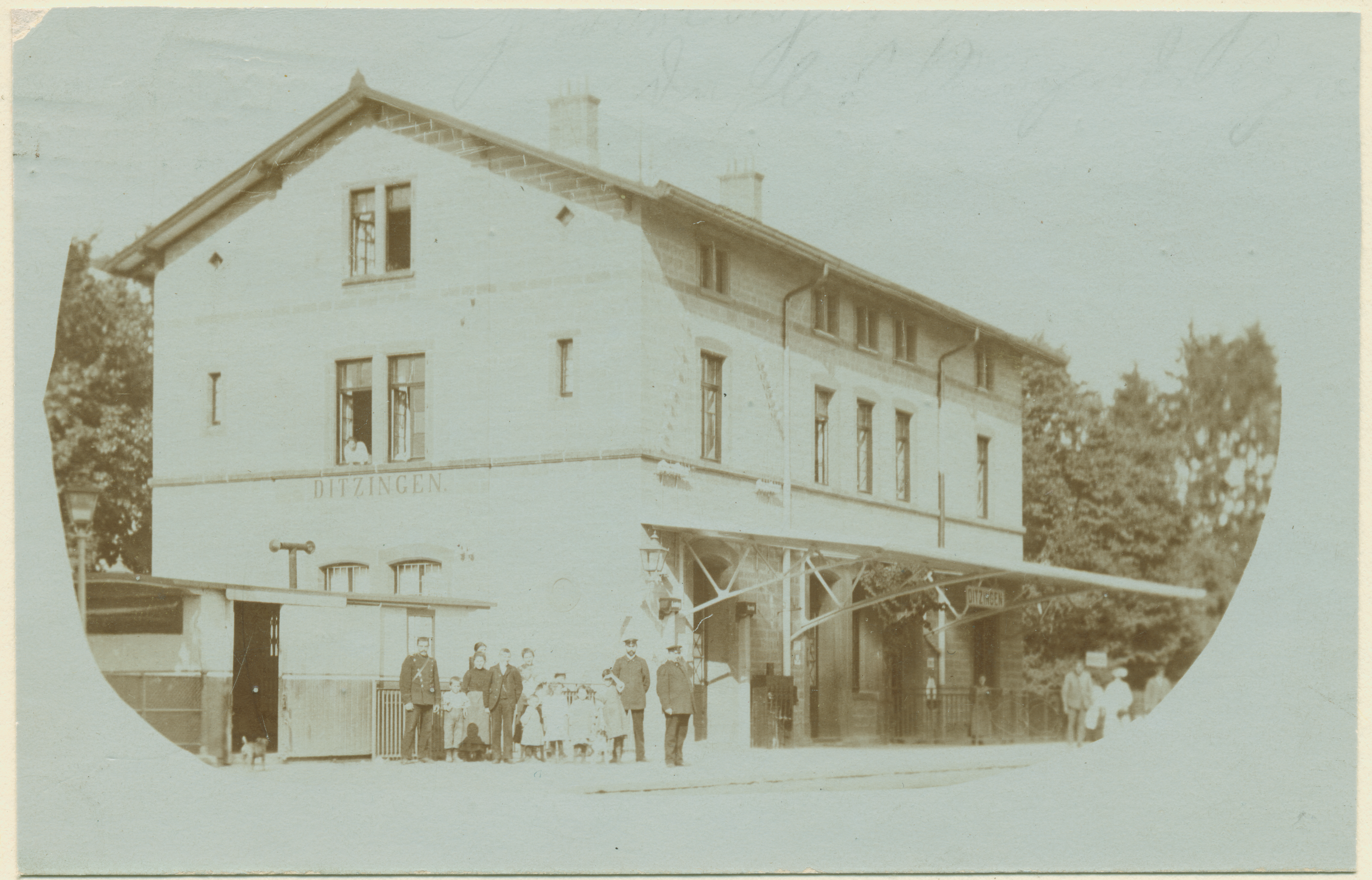
Station Master Karl Gruber at Ditzingen Station ~1905

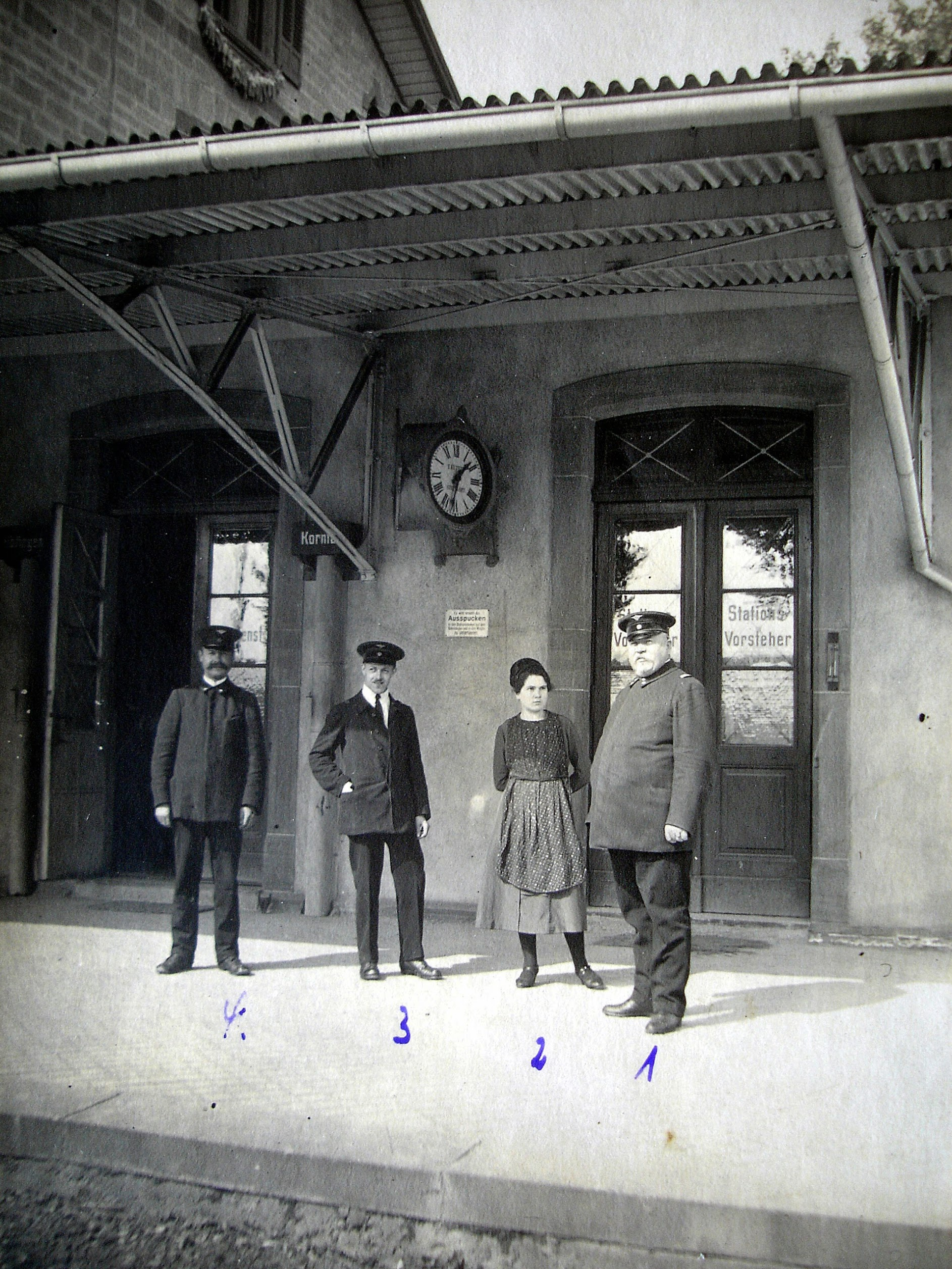
Ditzingen station 1914

Since 30 September 1932, the Ditzingen–Leonberg section has had two tracks. Deutsche Reichsbahn completed the duplication of the Korntal–Ditzingen section on 11 May 1938. On 15 May 1939, it electrified the Black Forest Railway between Zuffenhausen and Leonberg.

In the 1960s planning for the Stuttgart S-Bahn began in order to improve suburban services. Line S 6 between Weil der Stadt and Stuttgart was opened on 1 October 1978. Even the station has been given a new look. Since August 1987, plants have been established in front of the historic building.

== Infrastructure and railway operations ==
The station's track 1 (the “home” platform next to the station building) is now closed. The operating tracks are tracks 2 and 3, which are on either side of a central platform. The central platform is connected via an underpass to both sides of the line and by a lift, which is connected to a bridge to the north side. Trains to Leonberg stop on track 2 and trains to Zuffenhausen stop on track 3. The former freight tracks are dismantled or no longer in operation.

Line	Route
S 6	Weil der Stadt – Renningen – Leonberg – Ditzingen – Zuffenhausen – Hauptbahnhof – Schwabstraße
S 60	Böblingen – Sindelfingen – Magstadt – Renningen – Leonberg – Ditzingen – Zuffenhausen – Hauptbahnhof – Schwabstraße

The station is classified by Deutsche Bahn as a category 4 station.
