= Stuttgart-Weilimdorf station =

Railway station in Stuttgart, Germany

Stuttgart Weilimdorf
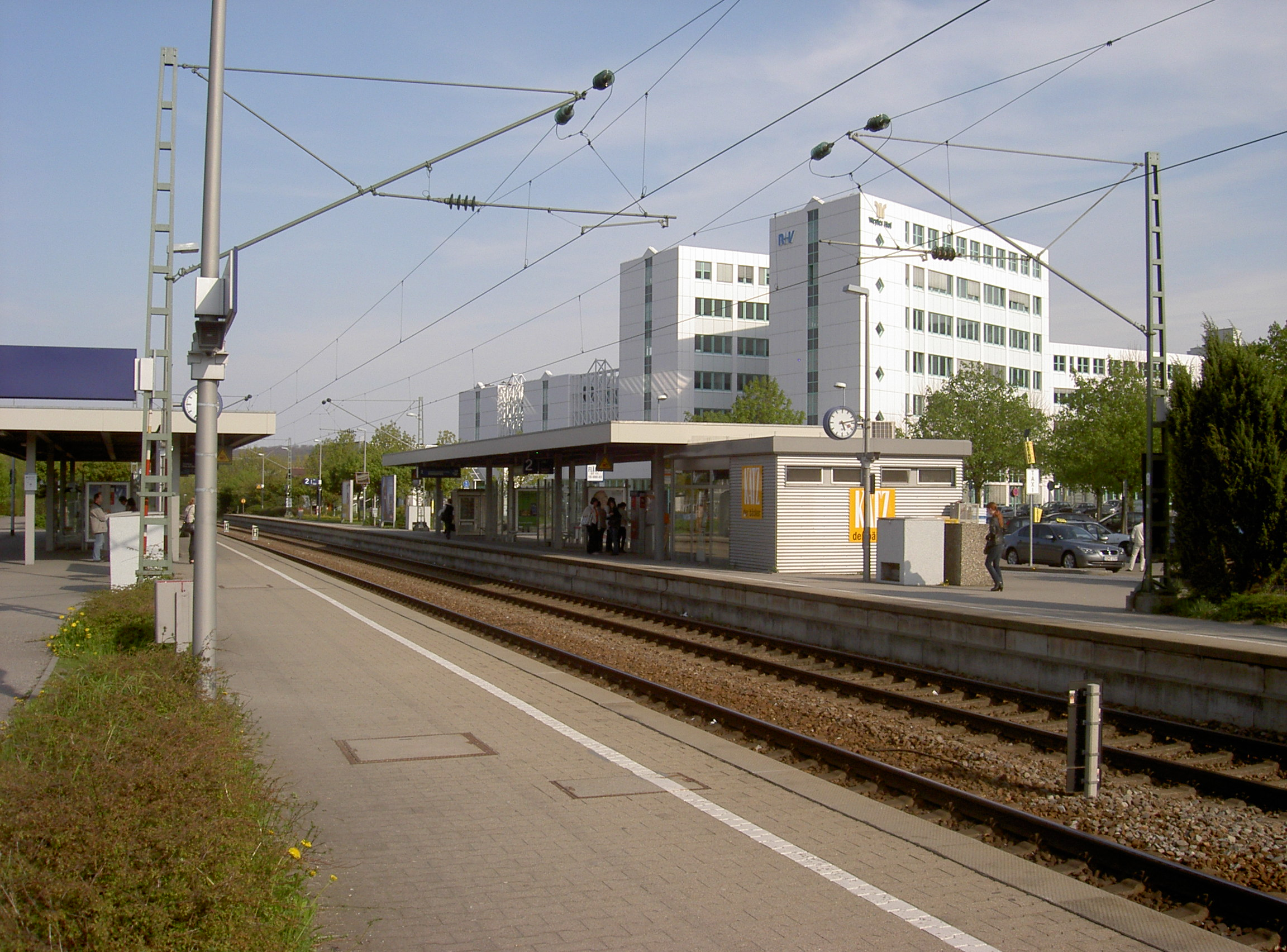

General information
- Location: Mittlerer Pfad, Weilimdorf, BW; Germany
- Coordinates: 48°49′19″N 9°5′39″E
- Lines: Black Forest Railway (KBS 790.6)
- Platforms: 2

Construction
- Accessible: Yes

Other information
- Station code: 6088
- DS100 code: TSWF
- IBNR: 8006268
- Category: 5
- Fare zone: : 1 and 2
- Website: www.bahnhof.de

History
- Opened: 3 December 1988

Services
Preceding station	Stuttgart S-Bahn	Following station
Korntal towards Schwabstraße	S6	Ditzingen towards Weil der Stadt
Korntal towards Schwabstraße	S60	Ditzingen towards Böblingen
Location

Stuttgart-Weilimdorf station is in the Stuttgart municipality of Weilimdorf in the German state of Baden-Württemberg on the Württemberg Black Forest railway and is part of the Stuttgart S-Bahn network.

== History ==
In the mid-1860s the Royal Württemberg State Railways (German: Königlich Württembergischen Staats-Eisenbahnen) planned a line from Stuttgart to Calw. This would branch from the Northern Railway (Nordbahn) in Feuerbach or Zuffenhausen and run through the Strohgäu district to Leonberg. In 1865, the parliament of Württemberg decided that the line would branch at Zuffenhausen. This decision had a negative impact on the community of Weil im Dorf, as the line only touched the north-west of the district.

The nearest station to the village was located almost two kilometres away in Korntal. It was opened on 23 September 1868. Because there were significantly more residents in Weil im Dorf than in Korntal, the station was called Kornthal-Weil im Dorf or, from 1904, Korntal-Weil im Dorf (reflecting a national spelling change). The village was connected to the station via Ludwigsburger Straße (now called Solitudestraße) or Bahnhofweg (now called Karl-Frey-Straße).

In 1913 and 1914, plans were developed for a line of the Stuttgart suburban tramway from Feuerbach via Weil im Dorf to Gerlingen. However, due to disputes over the route and the outbreak of World War I, the project could not be realised. Weil im Dorf finally received a tram service in 1926, with the opening of the Feuerbach Municipal Tramway (Städtische Straßenbahn Feuerbach). This now forms part of line U 13 of the Stuttgart Stadtbahn.

In May 1962, the Stuttgart City Council was presented with its Transport Master Plan commissioned in 1957. The traffic engineer Professor Walter Lambert had developed a transportation plan for the state capital and its environs. His design also took into account Weilimdorf (as it had been spelt since 1955) and he proposed a new station on the Black Forest Railway, between the stations of Korntal and Ditzingen. This was finally opened by Deutsche Bundesbahn on 3 December 1988.

== Rail operations ==
The station is served by lines S 6 and S 60 of the Stuttgart S-Bahn. It has two through tracks. Track 1 is served by trains towards Korntal and track 2 is served by trains towards Leonberg.

Line	Route
S 6	Weil der Stadt – Renningen – Leonberg – Weilimdorf – Zuffenhausen – Hauptbahnhof – Schwabstraße (additional services in the peak between Leonberg and Schwabstraße)
S 60	Böblingen – Sindelfingen – Magstadt – Renningen – Leonberg – Weilimdorf – Zuffenhausen – Hauptbahnhof – Schwabstraße

The station is classified by Deutsche Bahn as a category 5 station.
