= Wieslauf Valley Railway =

Railway line in Germany

Schorndorf–Welzheim
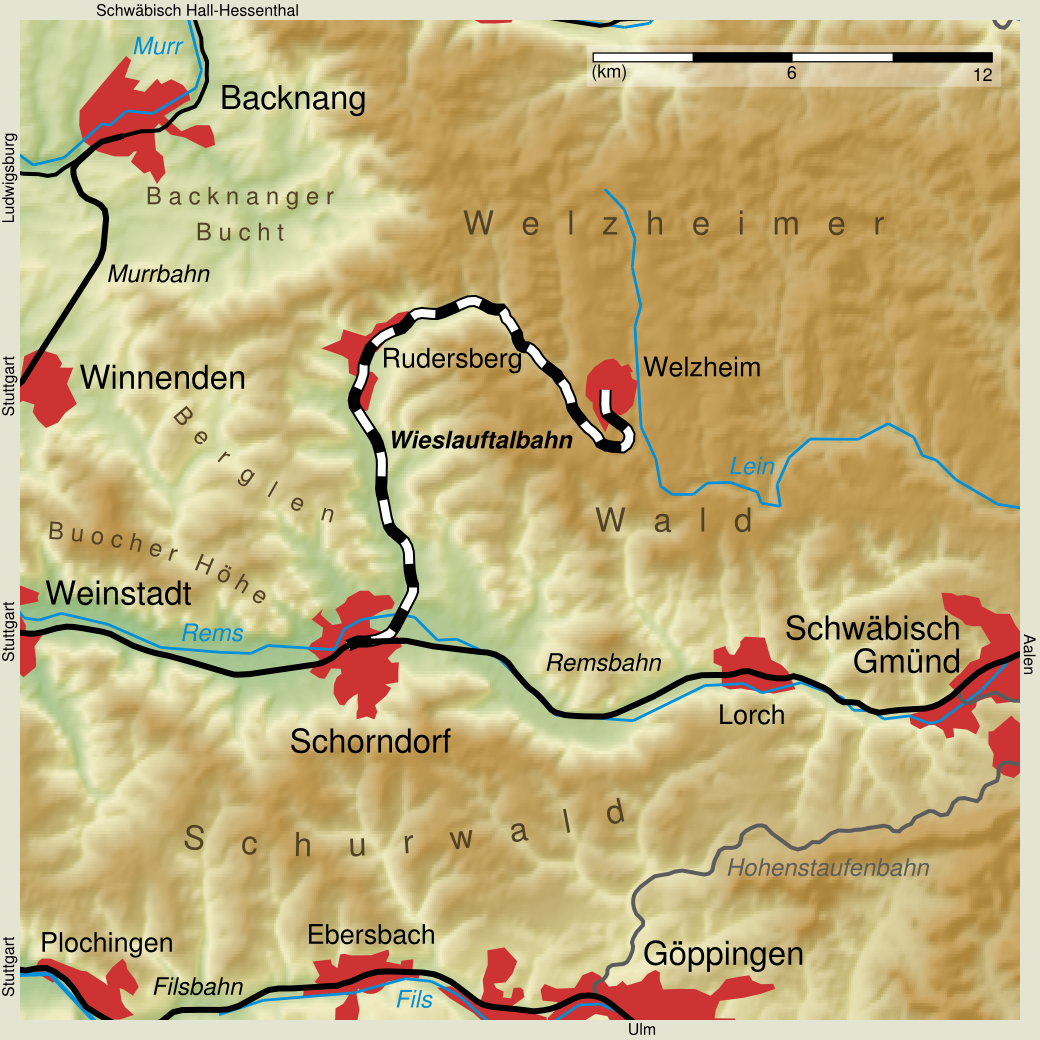

Overview
- Line number: 4751

Service
- Route number: 790.21 (bis 1992: 787)

Technical
- Line length: 22.83 km
- Minimum radius: 200 m
- Maximum incline: 1:40 = 2.5 %

The Wieslauf Valley Railway (German: Wieslauftalbahn) is a branch line in the Stuttgart region of the German state of Baden-Württemberg. It is single-track and standard gauge, and was originally 22.8 km (14.2 mi) long, connecting the main Remsbahn line at Schorndorf to Welzheim. Today it is operated in two sections, with the first 11.5 km (7.1 mi) from Schorndorf to Rudersberg served by a regular passenger service, whilst the final 11.3 km (7.0 mi) forms a steam operated heritage railway.

The Wieslauftalbahn is owned by the Zweckverbandes Verkehrsverband Wieslauftalbahn. The Schorndorf to Rudersberg section is operated by the Württembergische Eisenbahn-Gesellschaft (WEG), a member of the Transdev group. The Rudersberg to Welzheim section is leased to, and operated by, the Schwäbische Waldbahn GmbH.

Passenger services on the Rudersberg to Welzheim section of the Wieslauftalbahn use a fleet of 6 single unit railcars. Of these, 2 are Stadler Regio-Shuttle RS1 units with a partial low floor, whilst the remaining 4 units are high floor NE 81 vehicles. The typical service pattern consists of either one or two trains an hour, depending on the day and time of day, with each train taking 20 minutes for its journey. There is no service on Sundays.

Steam operated passenger services operate only on selected days, mostly summer Sundays. Trains operate over the full length of the Wieslauftalbahn, from Schorndorf to Welzheim.

== Gallery ==
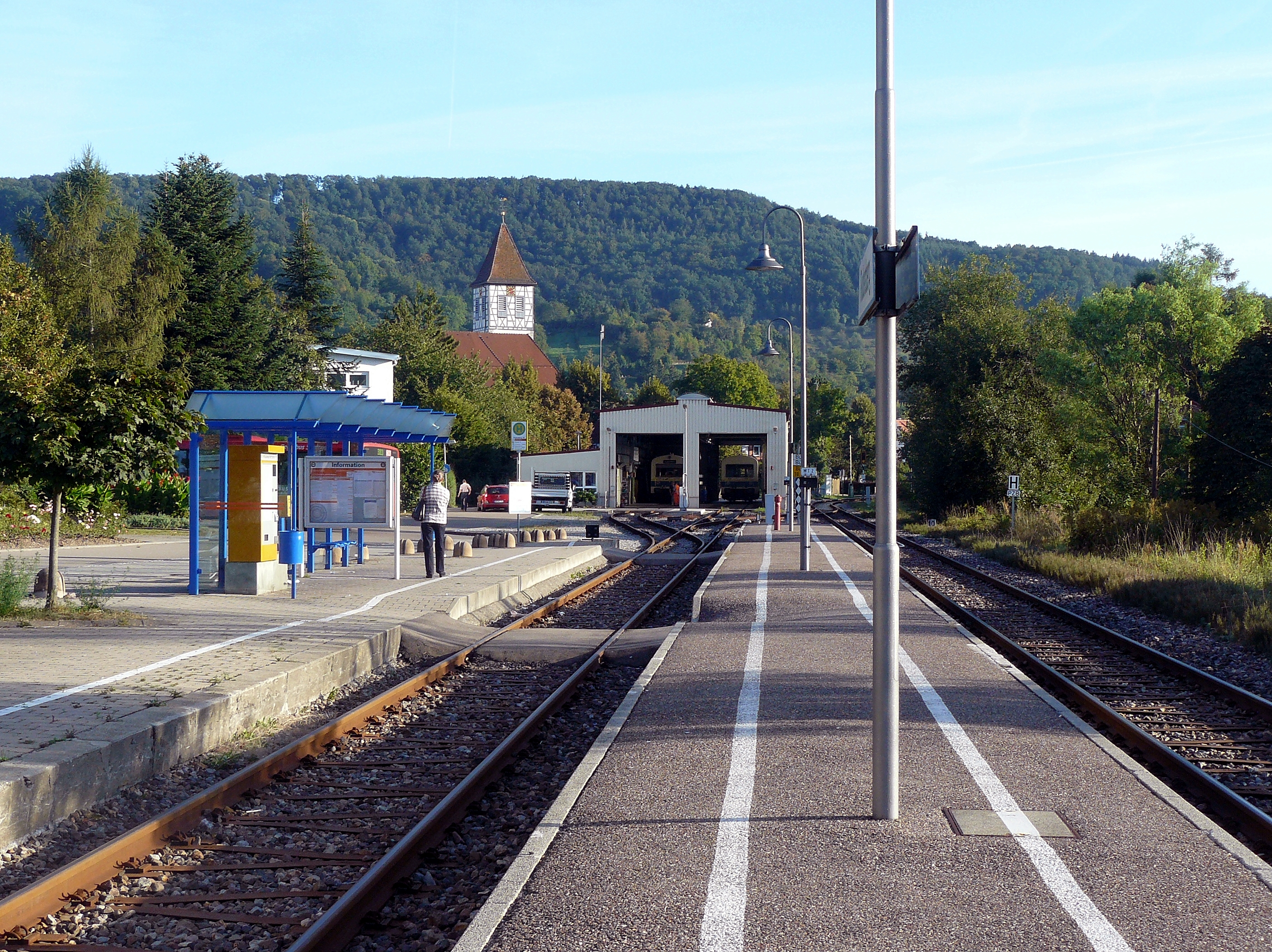
Rudersberg station

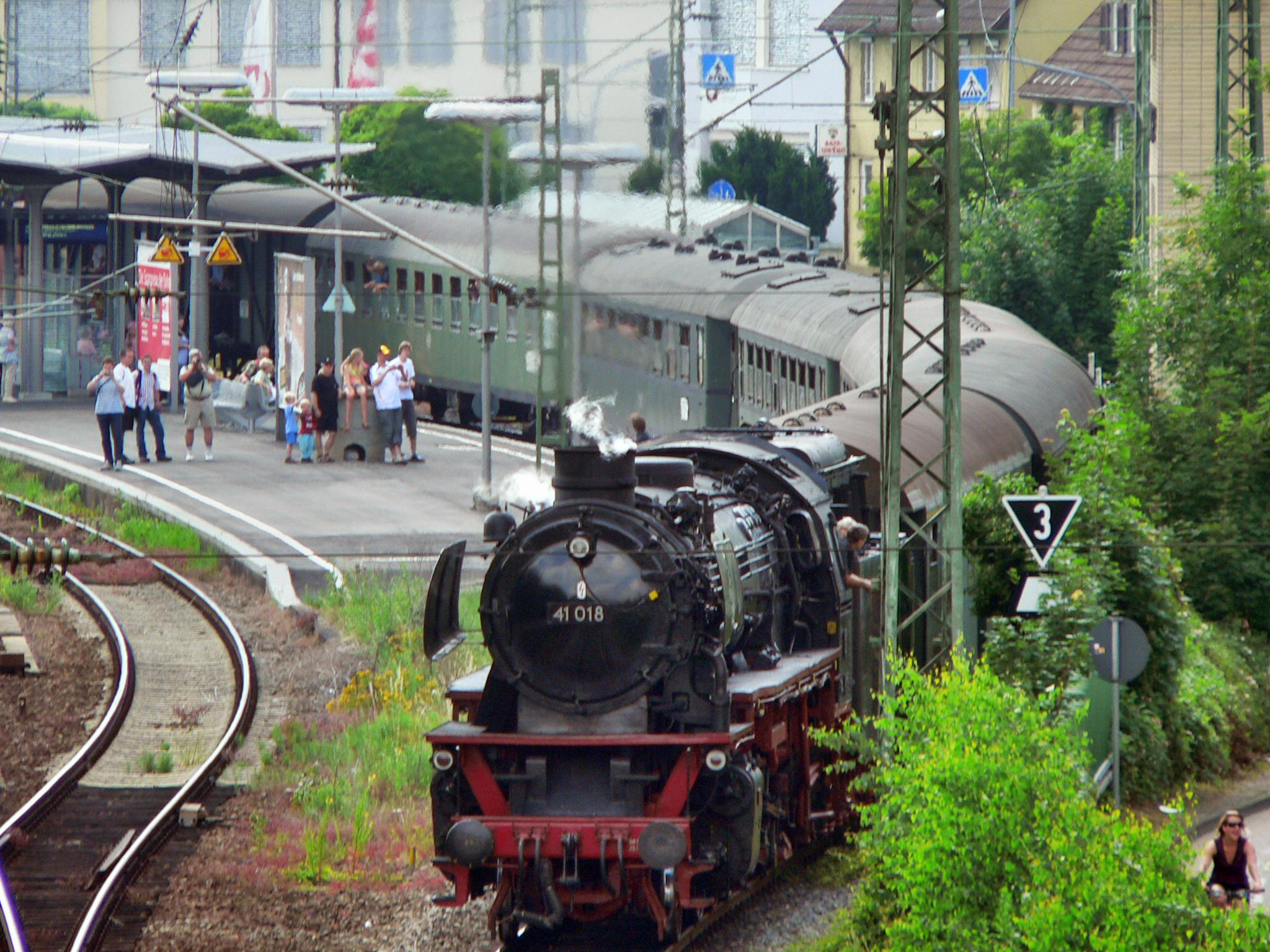
Steam train at Schorndorf

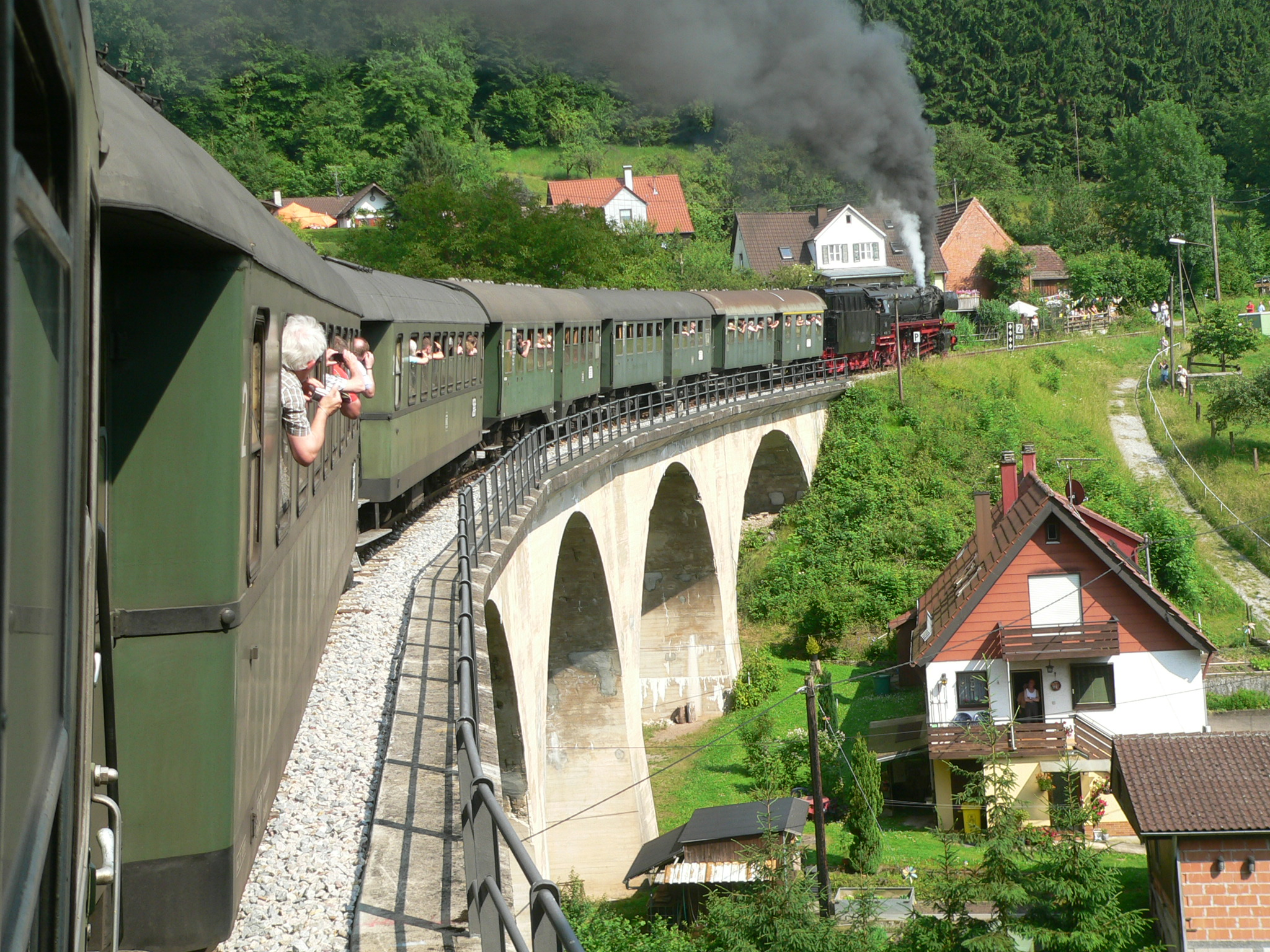
Steam train on the line
