= Pauline Fatme =

Protestant missionary in Egypt

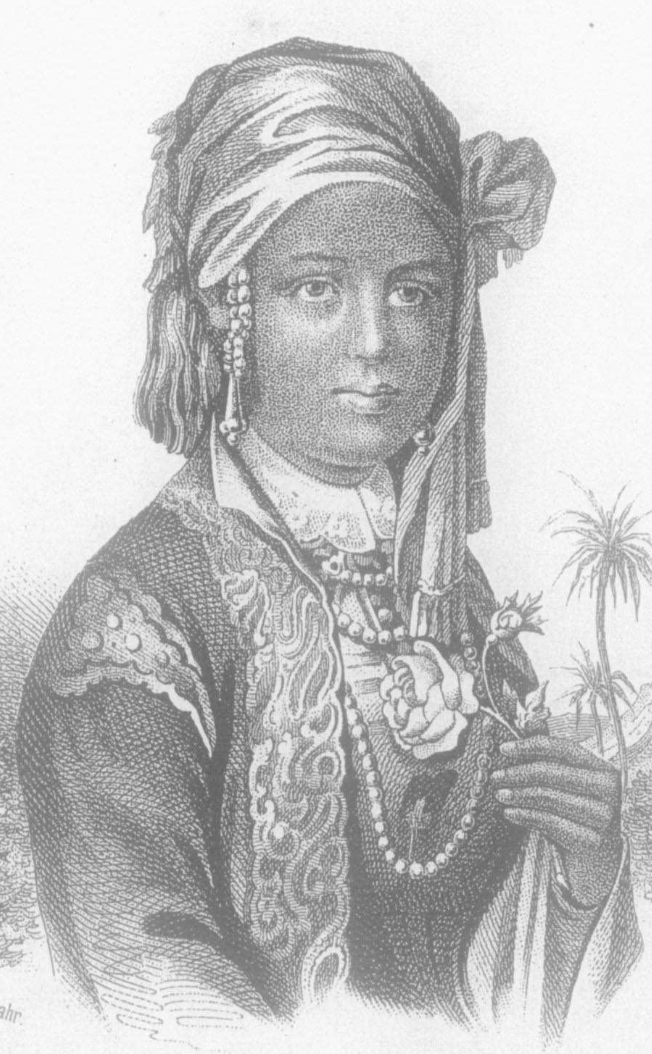
- Pauline Fathme, in the 1867 frontispiece to Ledderhose's booklet
- Born: Ganomeh or Ganamee about 1831; Oromia, Abyssinia
- Died: 11 September 1855; Switzerland
- Other names: Pauline Johanne, Pauline Fathme, Ganamee Yaa'ii Sasheedaa
- Occupation: Protestant missionary

Pauline Fatme (about 1831 – 11 September 1855), born Ganomeh or Ganamee, was an East African-born Protestant missionary and emancipated slave who lived in Württemberg and died in Switzerland.

== Early life in Africa ==
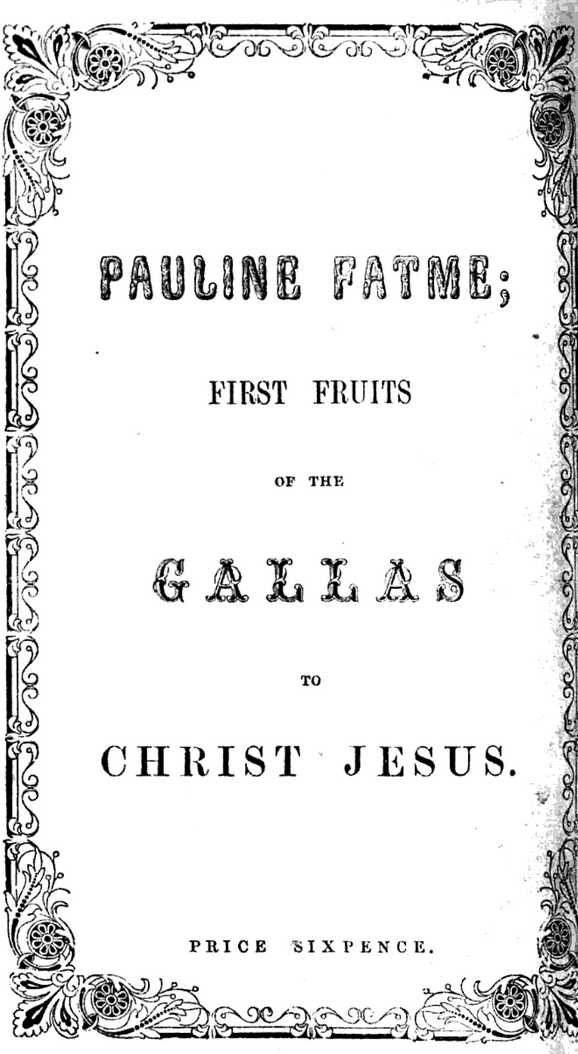
Title page of the English edition of Pauline Fatme (1857)

Ganomeh was born in the Oromia region of Ethiopia, then known as Abyssinia, the daughter of Jai Tshasseda Odah, an Oromo (or Galla) chief. She was orphaned when she was a young girl, and trafficked by merchants as a slave, first in Sudan, and then in Cairo, under the name "Fatme" (or Fatima).

== In Europe ==
By the late 1840s Fatme was a servant in the household of ornithologist and baron Johannes Wilhelm von Müller in Württemberg. She learned to speak German. In 1852, she was baptized as "Pauline Johanne", after the queen of Württemberg. After two years of training at Korntal, the Protestant Missionary Society of Basel supported Fatmé to follow in the mission work of Johann Ludwig Krapf in East Africa. However, she fell ill before embarking on that assignment, and died in 1855, in Switzerland, "in the twenty-fourth year of her age". Her grave is in the churchyard of Riehen, near St. Chrischona. "Her sepulchre is to us a continual admonition not to forget the millions of Gallas", commented an 1857 report.

== Legacy ==
An 1855 German-language booklet by Ledderhose about her life and work was published in English as Pauline Fatme; First Fruits of the Gallas to Christ Jesus (1857). In her memory, her Swiss godfather Christian Friedrich Spittler founded mission stations along the route between Jerusalem and Abyssinia.
