= Korntal-Münchingen =

- Town
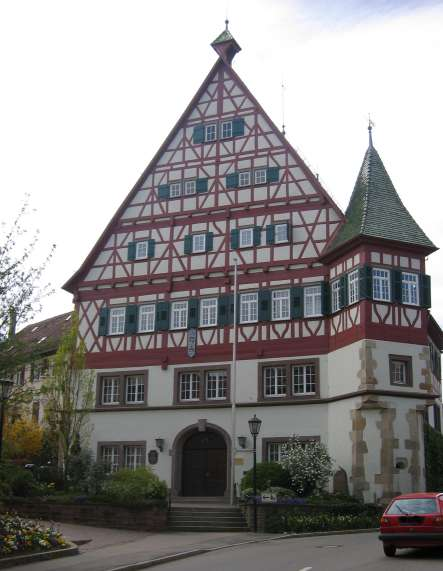
- Town hall (Münchingen)

- Coat of arms

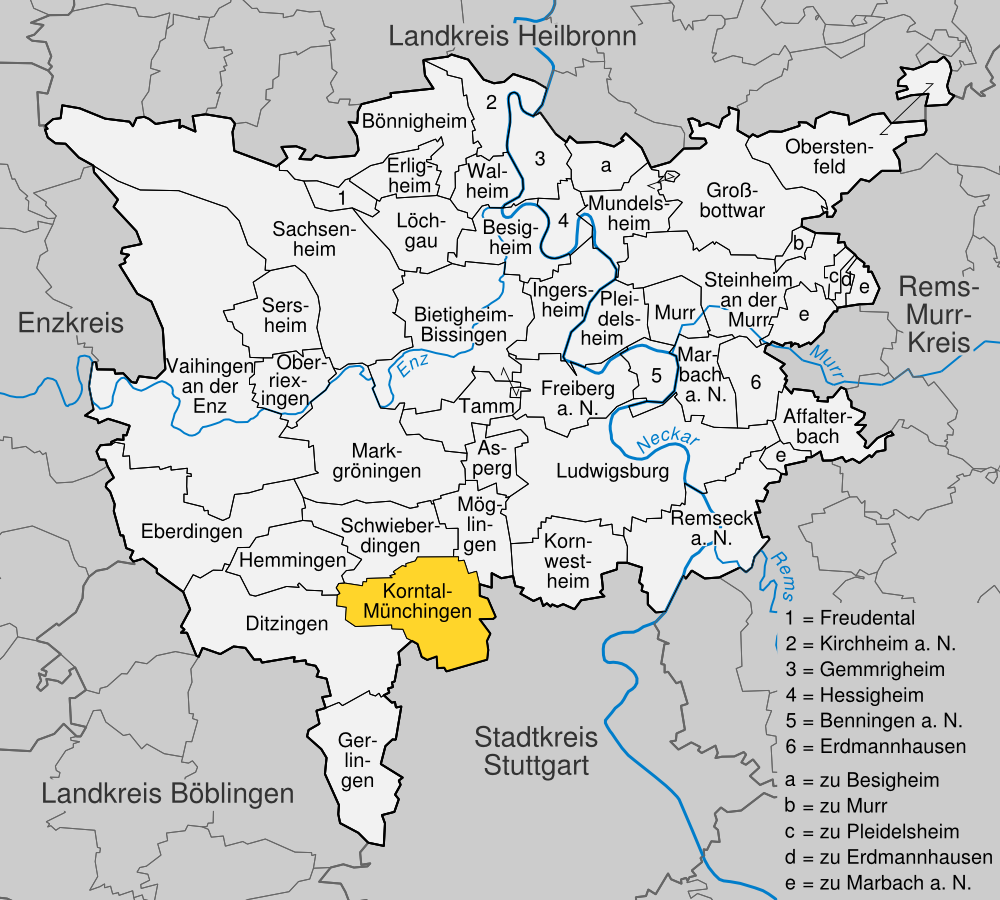
- Location of Korntal-Münchingen within Ludwigsburg district
- Interactive map of Korntal-Münchingen
- Location within Germany Location within Baden-Württemberg
- Coordinates: 48°49′50″N 9°7′17″E
- Country: Germany
- State: Baden-Württemberg
- Admin. region: Stuttgart
- District: Ludwigsburg

Government
  - Mayor (2023–31): Alexander Noak

Area
  - Total: 20.71 km^{2} (8.00 sq mi)
- Elevation: 304 m (997 ft)

Population (2025-12-31)
  - Total: 19,666
  - Density: 949.6/km^{2} (2,459/sq mi)
- Time zone: UTC+01:00 (CET)
  - Summer (DST): UTC+02:00 (CEST)
- Postal codes: 70825
- Dialling codes: 0711 (Korntal), 07150 (Münchingen)
- Vehicle registration: LB
- Website: www.korntal-muenchingen.de

Korntal-Münchingen (German pronunciation: [ˈkɔʁnˌtaːl ˈmʏnçɪŋən]) is a town in the district of Ludwigsburg, Baden-Württemberg, Germany. It is situated at the northwestern border of Stuttgart, 8 km of its centre and 10 km southwest of Ludwigsburg.

== Geography ==
=== Location ===
Korntal-Münchingen lies in the Strohgäu, at elevations between 285 and 405 meters, directly on the northwestern border of Stuttgart.

The border between Korntal and the Stuttgart borough Weilimdorf cuts right through a built up area. At the Liegnitzer Straße south of Korntal station, the houses on the north side of the street (odd house numbers) are part of Korntal while the houses on the south side of the street (even house numbers) belong to Weilimdorf.

There is no direct road connection between Korntal and Münchingen, motorized traffic needs to pass through Stuttgart roads to get from one to the other. In contrast, pedestrians and cyclists can cross districts via dirt roads which are in large parts made inaccessible to motorized traffic. The Strogäubahn serves as a direct connection between the two districts.

Korntal borders on Stuttgart, Ditzingen, Hemmingen, Schwieberdingen and Möglingen, of which, except for Stuttgart, all are part of the district of Ludwigsburg.

=== Constituent communities ===
Korntal-Münchingen was created from the merger of the city Korntal and the community Münchingen. It is divided into three districts: Korntal, Münchingen, and Kallenberg. The official designation of the districts is Korntal-Münchingen, area Korntal; Korntal-Münchingen, area Münchingen; Korntal-Münchingen, area Kallenberg. The former city of Korntal consists of the district of Korntal. The former municipality of Münchingen consists of the district of Münchingen, including Kallenberg, Müllerheim, the mill "Glemsmühle" at the Glems stream and the estate "Hof Mauer". It also comprises the now abandoned settlements of "Birkach", "Leinfelden" and "Rugelberg".

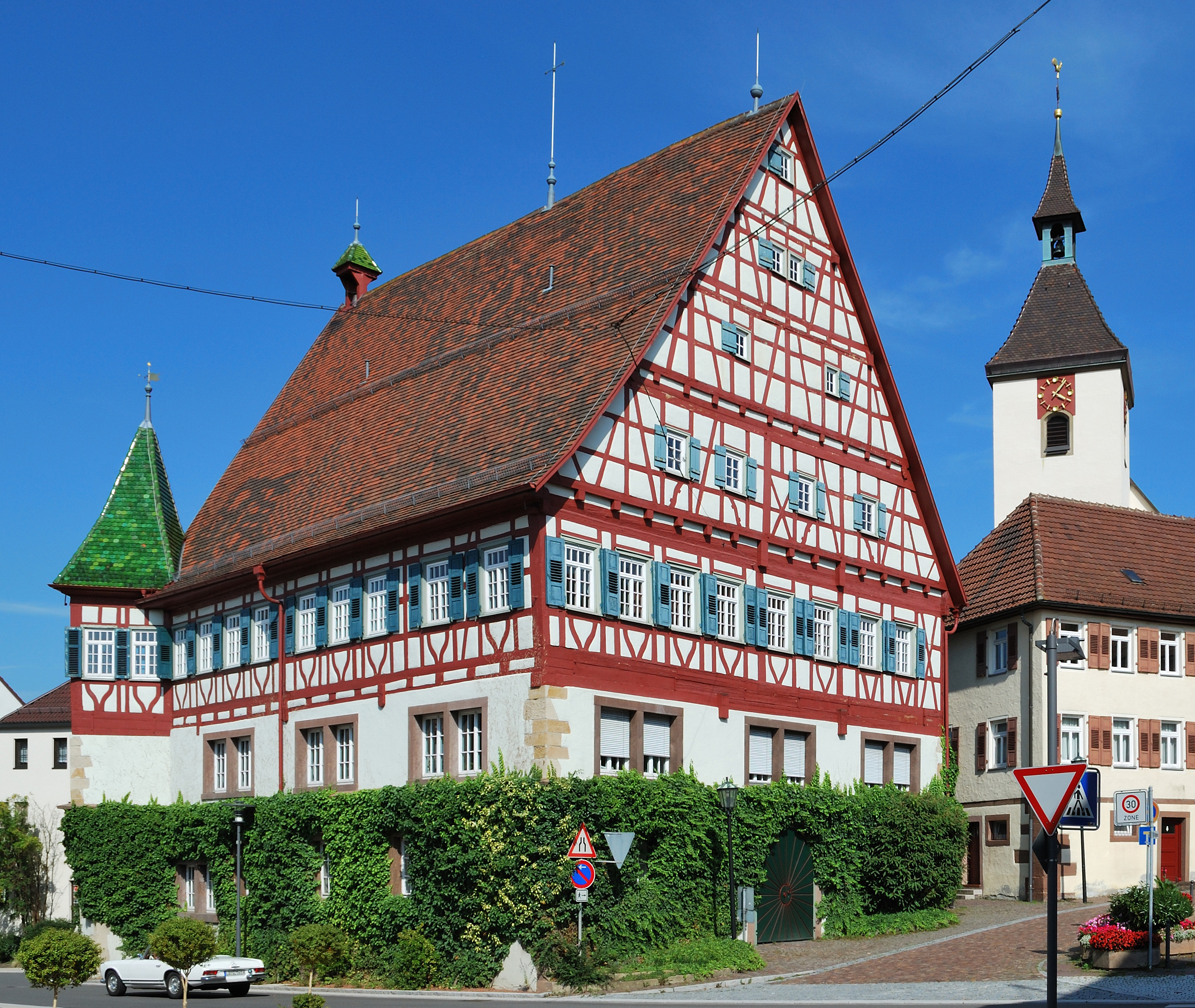
Münchingen Town hall

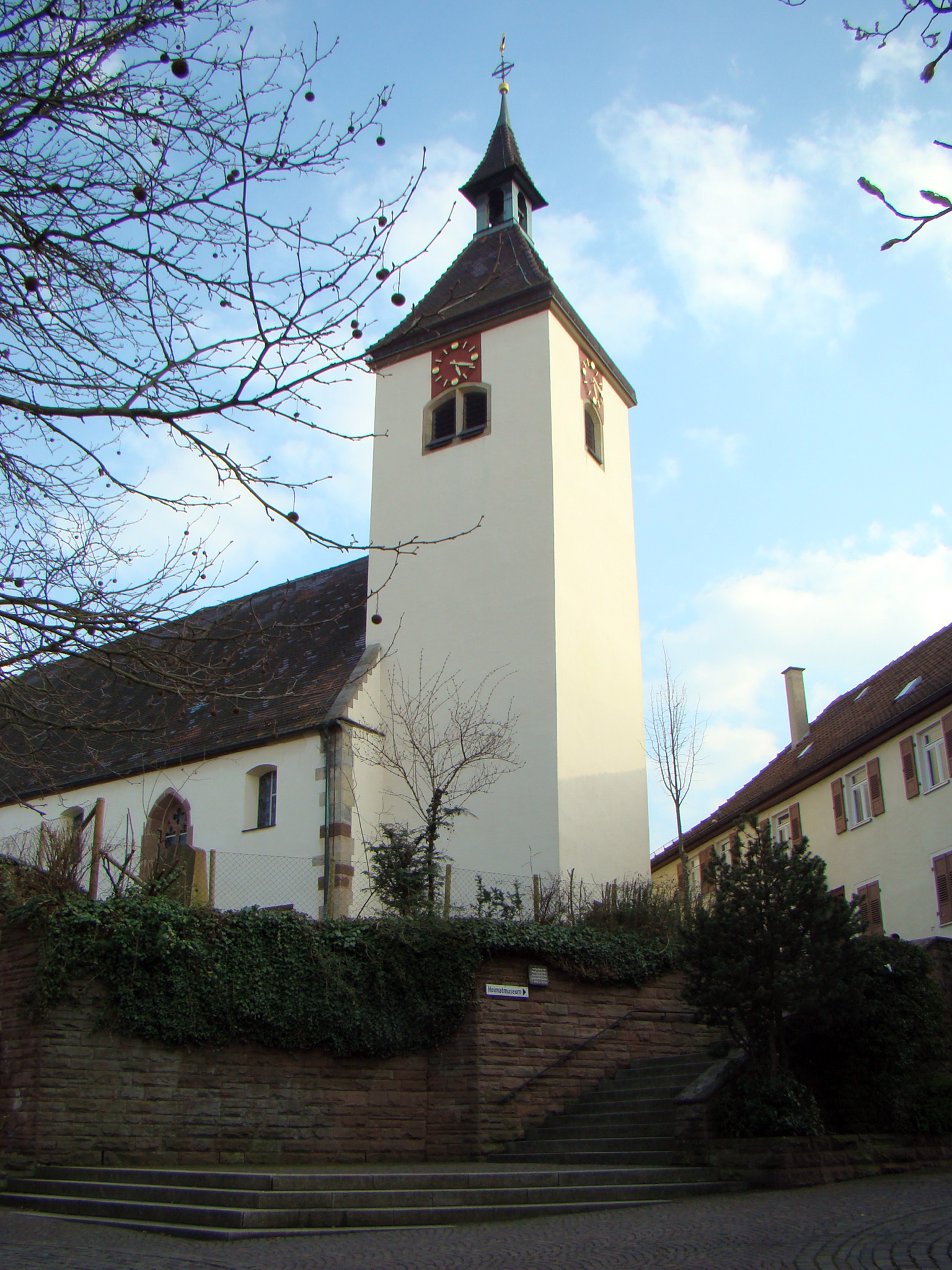
Münchingen-Johannes church

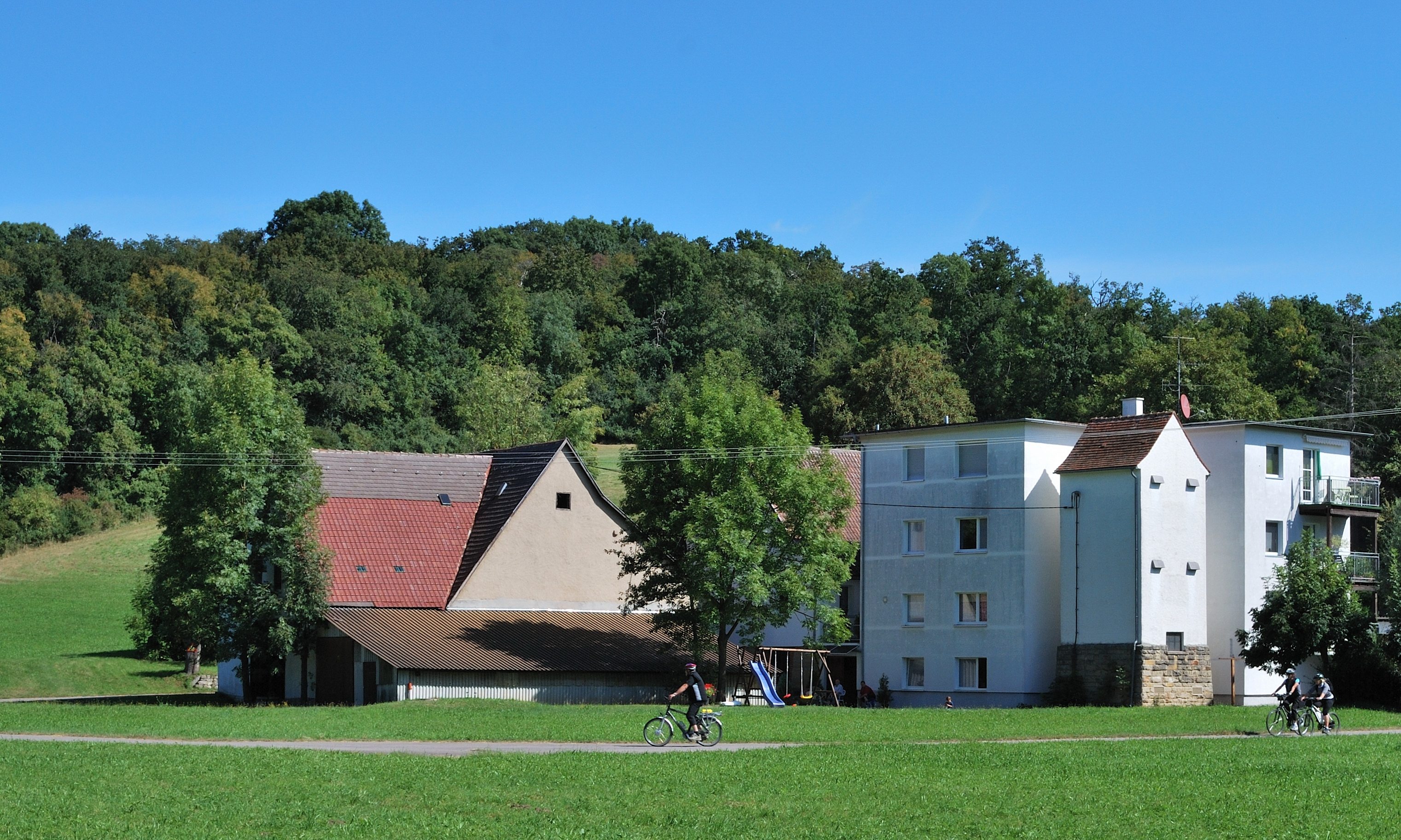
Glems Mühle (mill)

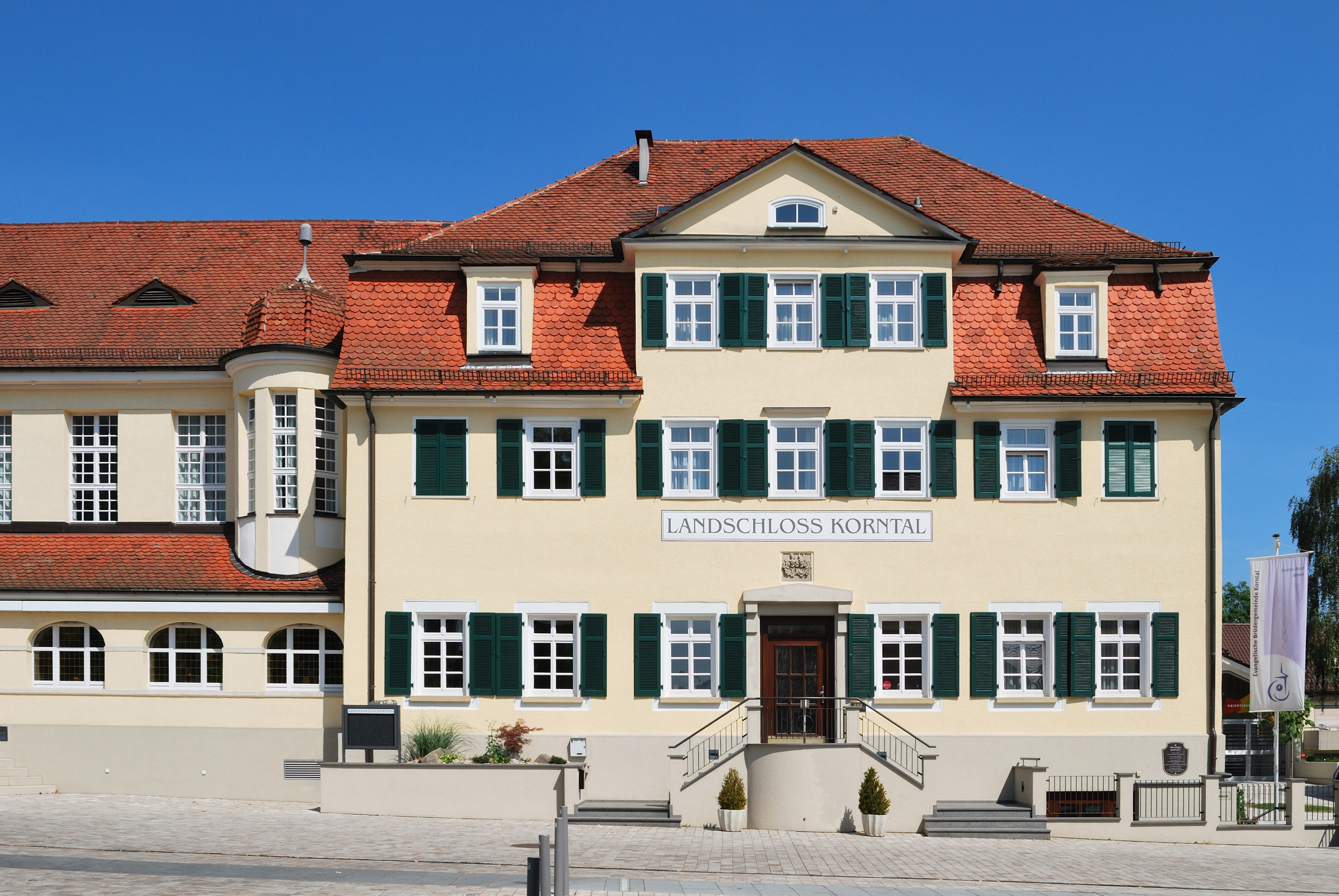
Castle Korntal

== History ==
The present city was founded on 1 January 1975, in the course of district reform in Baden-Württemberg, when the city of Korntal and the community of Münchingen were combined - against the declared will of most of the citizens of Münchingen - which was seen as a better alternative to Korntal being integrated into Stuttgart.

=== Korntal ===
The district Korntal was first documented in 1297 in the records of Sindelfingen. Korntal was an estate until 1819 and belonged to the municipality of Weilimdorf (which is today Stuttgart-Weilimdorf) In 1819 the town of Korntal was founded as a civic-religious community on the model of the communities established in Germany by the Moravian Church. In connection with the construction of the Great Hall of Württemberg, William I of Württemberg granted certain special rights to the community. These were lost in 1919 with the Weimar constitution; at this time the community was no longer connected to the Moravian Church. In 1868, Korntal station was opened on the Black Forest Railway between Zuffenhausen and Calw. On 30 June 1958, the municipality of Korntal gained the status of a city.

=== Münchingen ===
Münchingen was first documented in 1130 in the "Zwiefalter Chronicle", and was ceded in 1336 by the sons of Ulrich von Asperg to Count Ulrich of Württemberg. St. Catharine's Hospital was built in 1278 and a mill was built in 1381. In 1558 the "old" Münchinger Castle was built; the "new" castle was built in 1735. During the Thirty Years' War, a large part of the village was destroyed. The first courthouse was built in 1599 and was rebuilt in 1687. The St. John's Lutheran Church was newly built from 1645 to 1650. A new school was built in 1645, and then rebuilt in 1743-1744. In 1906, Münchingen received a rail connection (Strohgäubahn), a single-track regional train from Feuerbach to Weissach.

== Mayor ==
The mayor is Joachim Wolf. He was elected in 2007 and reelected in 2015. His predecessor was Peter Stritzelberger. After having served for two terms of 8 years, he is set to be replaced in the aftermath of the election on 23 April 2023

== Education ==
Schools include:

- Primary education (1-4)
  - Teichwiesenschule (Korntal)
  - Flattichschule (Münchingen
  - Freie Evangelische Schule (Korntal)
  - Johannes-Kullen-Schule (Korntal)
- Secondary education:
  - Gymnasium Korntal-Münchingen (Korntal)
  - Realschule Korntal-Münchingen (Korntal)
- Special-needs-schools
  - Johannes-Kullen-Schule (Korntal)
  - Strohgäuschule (Münchingen)

== Notable people ==
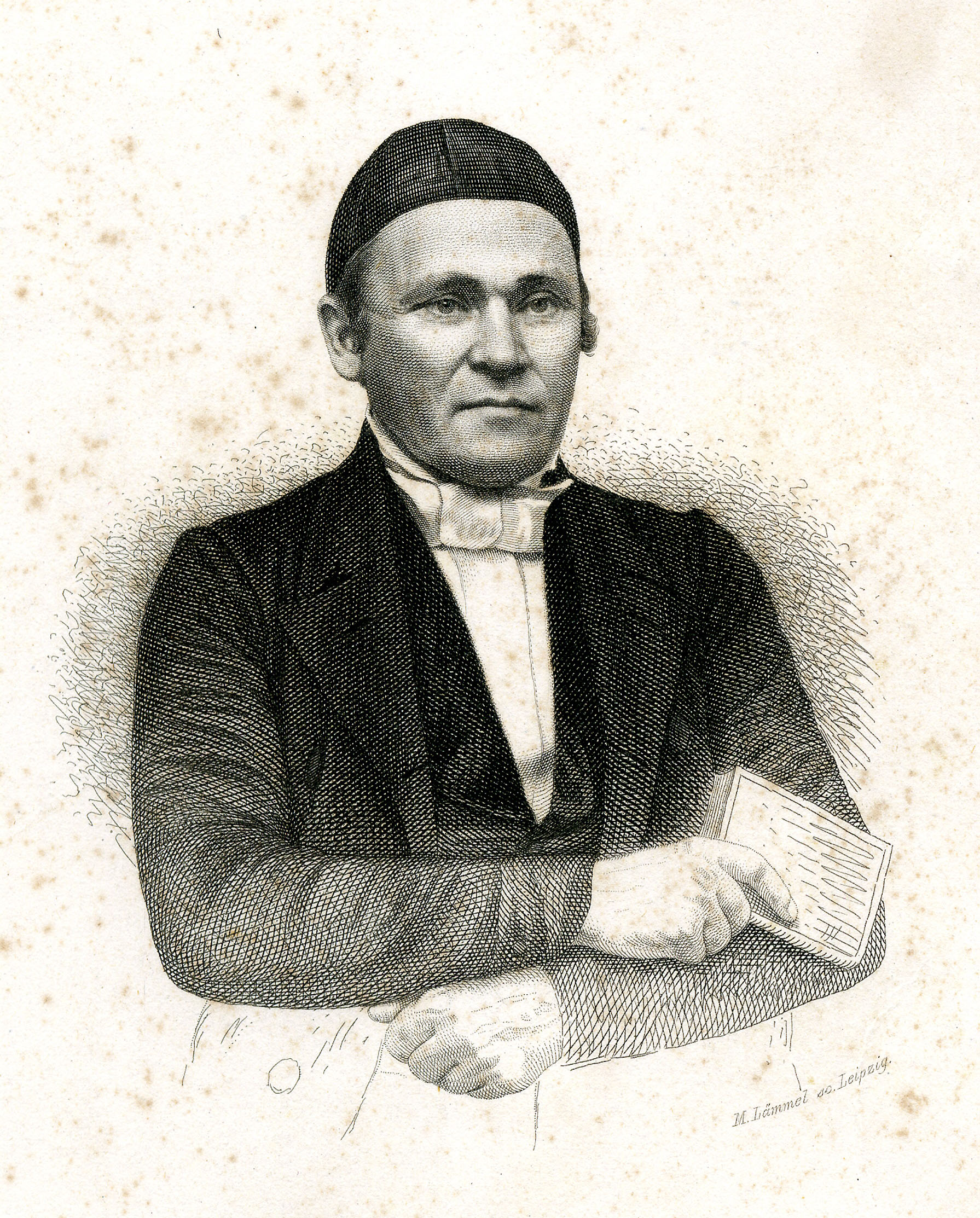
Johann Ludwig Krapf

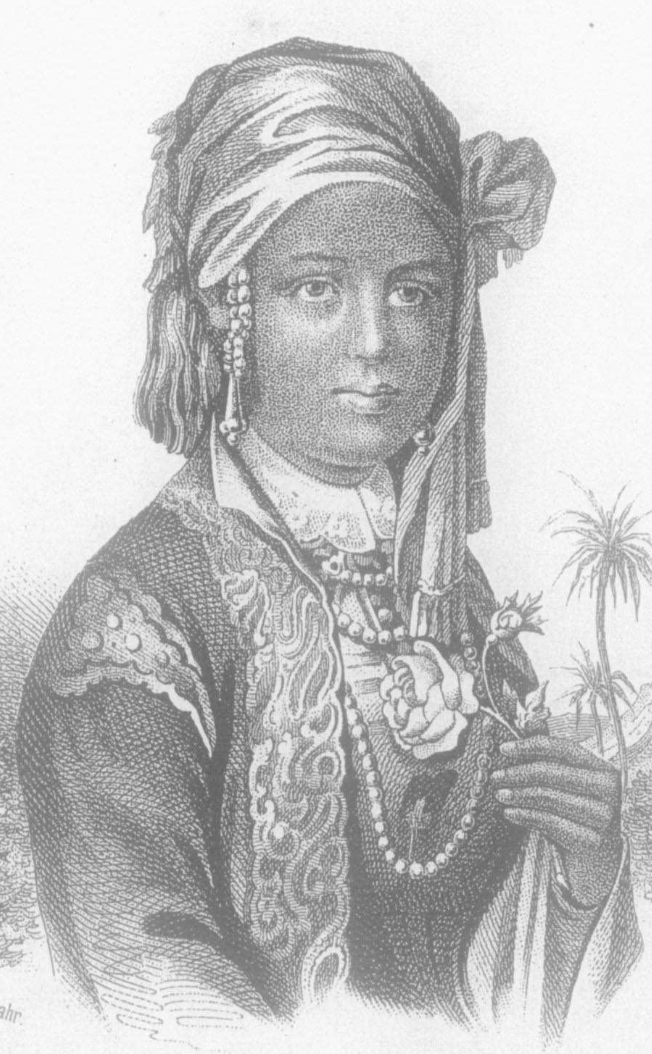
Pauline Fathme, 1855

- Johann Georg Gmelin (1674-1728), pharmacist and chemist
- Rosina Widmann (1826–1908), educator and missionary in Ghana, opened a school in Akropong
- Andreas Barner (1835–1910), organist, composer
- Gottlieb Löffler (1868–1946), painter and art educator
- Rudolf Daur (1892–1976), protestant pastor, head of the "Köngener Bund"
- Paul Bausch (1895–1981), politician (CSVD, later CDU)
- Hedwig Goller (1920–2015), painter, illustrator and cultural educator
- Berthold Leibinger (1930-2018), grew up locally, mechanical engineer, philanthropist, head of Trumpf
- Irmela Hijiya-Kirschnereit (born 1948), Japanologist and translator.
- Frieder Reininghaus (born 1949), Musikpublizist and cultural correspondent
- Gunther Krichbaum (born 1964), politician (CDU)
- Ralf Schmerberg (born 1965), photographer, producer and film maker
- Jörg Scheller (born 1979), art historian, journalist

=== People who have worked locally ===
- Johann Ludwig Krapf (1810-1881), pietistic missionary, explorer, linguistic and African explorer, died locally
- Pauline Fatme (ca1831–1855), born in Oromia, Ethiopia, East African missionary, educated at Korntal
- Martin Winterkorn (born 1947), Chairman of the Board of Management of Volkswagen AG, grew up in Münchingen

== International relations ==
Korntal-Münchingen is twinned with:

- France: Mirande (Gers)
- Belgium: Tubize (Walloon Brabant)
