= Höfingen station =

Railway station in Leonberg, Germany

Höfingen
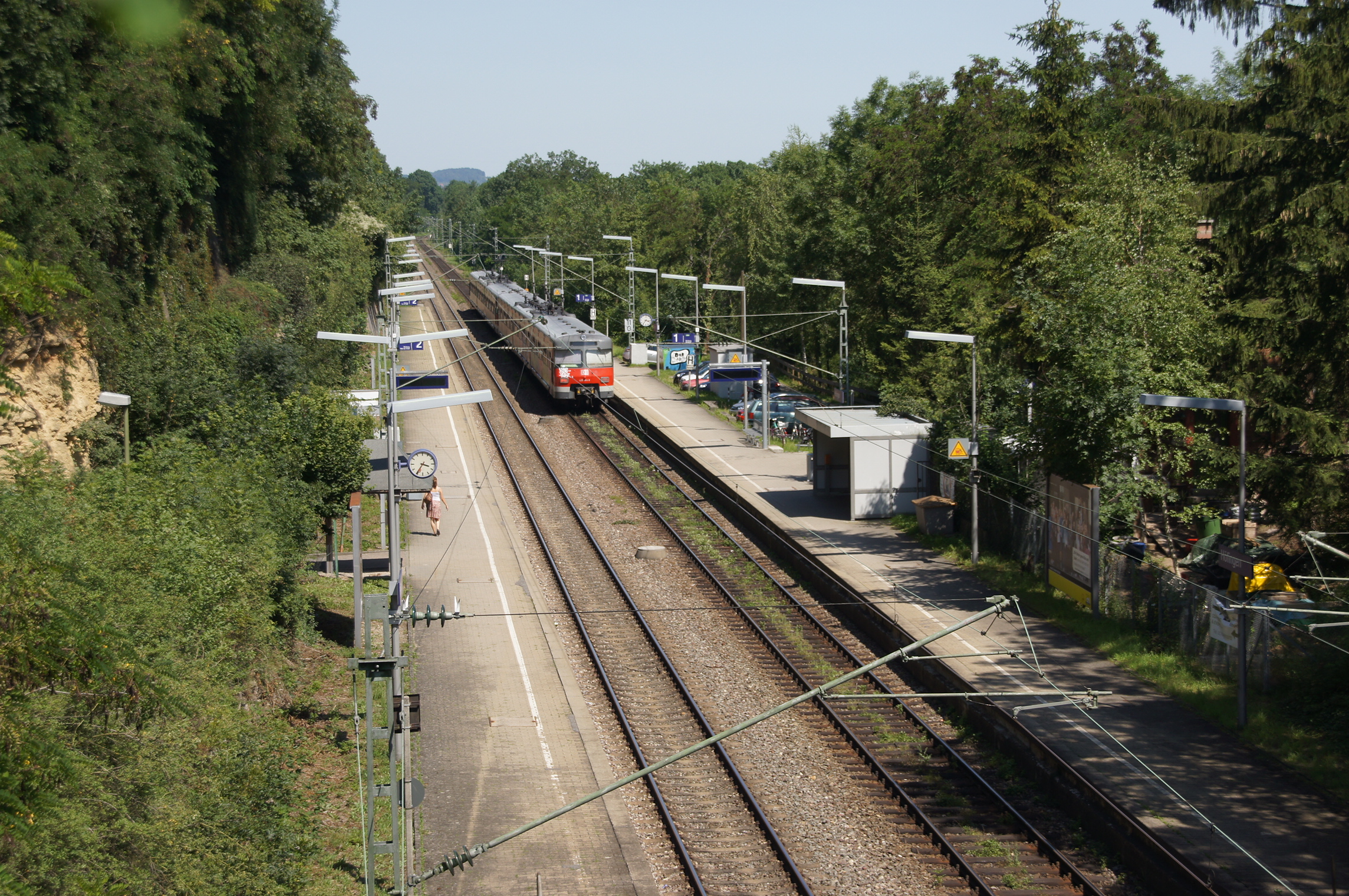

General information
- Location: Felsgartenstraße, Leonberg, Baden-Württemberg; Germany
- Coordinates: 48°48′54″N 9°1′32″E
- Line: Black Forest Railway (KSB 790.6)
- Platforms: 2

Construction
- Accessible: Yes

Other information
- Station code: 2829
- DS100 code: THFG
- IBNR: 8002892
- Category: 5
- Fare zone: : 2 and 3
- Website: www.bahnhof.de

History
- Opened: 16 January 1889

Services
| Preceding station | Stuttgart S-Bahn | Following station |
|---|---|---|
| Ditzingen towards Schwabstraße | S6 | Leonberg towards Weil der Stadt |
| Ditzingen towards Schwabstraße | S60 | Leonberg towards Böblingen |
Location

Höfingen station is in the Leonberg district of Höfingen in the German state of Baden-Württemberg. It is located at kilometre 10.9 of the Black Forest Railway and is a station on the network of the Stuttgart S-Bahn.

== History ==
On 1 December 1869, the Royal Württemberg State Railways opened the second leg of the Black Forest Railway, between Ditzingen and Weil der Stadt. It is assumed that Foreign Minister Karl von Varnbüler, the former owner of the Höfingen castle, influenced the route. However, although the route ran along the Glems valley through the district of Höfingen, the village at first had no station. After that, many residents joined together to form a citizens' association, which campaigned for the construction of a station. In 1885 the town gave Karl von Varnbüler honorary citizenship.

On 27 September 1888, the establishment of the station was announced. On 16 January 1889, the first train stopped at Höfingen in the presence of cheering people. The single-storey wooden station building with a waiting room and station services, as well as an adjoining freight shed, no longer exists. The trip from Stuttgart to Höfingen was then scheduled to take 35 minutes.

On 30 September 1932, the Deutsche Reichsbahn opened a second mainline track between Ditzingen and Leonberg. On 15 May 1939, electrical operations began between Zuffenhausen and Leonberg.

In the 1970s, Deutsche Bundesbahn rebuilt the halt as an S-Bahn station. In 1975, it demolished the entrance building. The former station master's house remained. Since 1 October 1978, S-Bahn line S 6 services running between Weil der Stadt and Schwabstraße stop in Höfingen.

== Rail services ==
The station is served by lines S 6 and S 60 of the Stuttgart S-Bahn. Track 1 is used for services to Zuffenhausen and track 2 is used for services to Leonberg.

The station is classified by Deutsche Bahn as a category 5 station.

=== S-Bahn ===
| Line | Route |
|---|---|
| S 6 | Weil der Stadt – Renningen – Leonberg – Höfingen – Zuffenhausen – Hauptbahnhof – Schwabstraße (additional services in the peak between Leonberg and Schwabstraße) |
| S 60 | Böblingen – Sindelfingen – Magstadt – Renningen – Leonberg – Höfingen – Zuffenhausen – Hauptbahnhof – Schwabstraße |
