= Strohgäu Railway =

Railway line in Baden-Württemberg, Germany

Korntal–Weissach
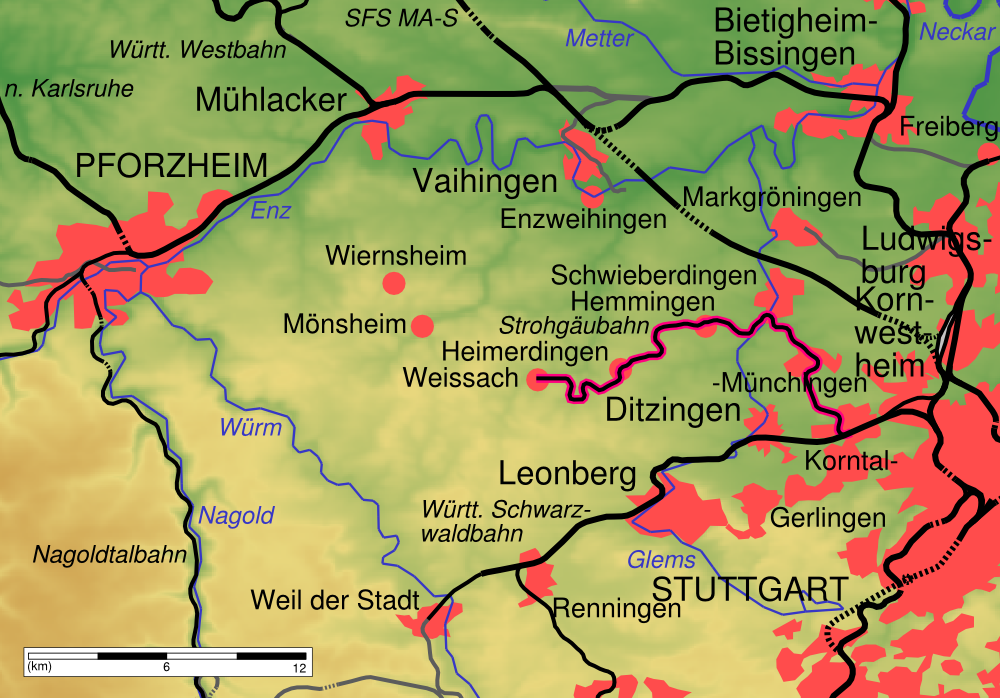

Overview
- Line number: 9486

Service
- Route number: 790.61

Technical
- Line length: 21.9 km
- Track gauge: 1435 mm
- Minimum radius: 200 m
- Operating speed: 60 km/h max.
- Maximum incline: 2.4 %

The Strohgäu Railway (German: Strohgäubahn) is a branch line in the Stuttgart region of the German state of Baden-Württemberg. It is single-track and standard gauge, and is 21.9 kilometres (13.6 mi) long. It links Weissach and Hemmingen with Korntal, where a connection is made with line S6 of the Stuttgart S-Bahn, which provides a direct service to Stuttgart.

The Strohgäubahn is owned and operated by the Württembergische Eisenbahn-Gesellschaft (WEG), a member of the Veolia Transport group. The line dates back to 1906, when it was originally opened by WEG.

Passenger services on the Strohgäubahn use Stadler Regio-Shuttle RS1 units with a partial low floor.

The typical service pattern consists of two trains an hour between Heimerdingen and Korntal, although the frequency may reduce to one train an hour on Sundays. The segment between Heimerdingen and Weissach is currently not operated regularly.

Until December 2012, trains were extended during peak periods from Korntal over the S-Bahn route to Stuttgart-Feuerbach. On several days per year, a Heritage railway is operated by the Railway Vehicle Preservation Company.

== Gallery ==
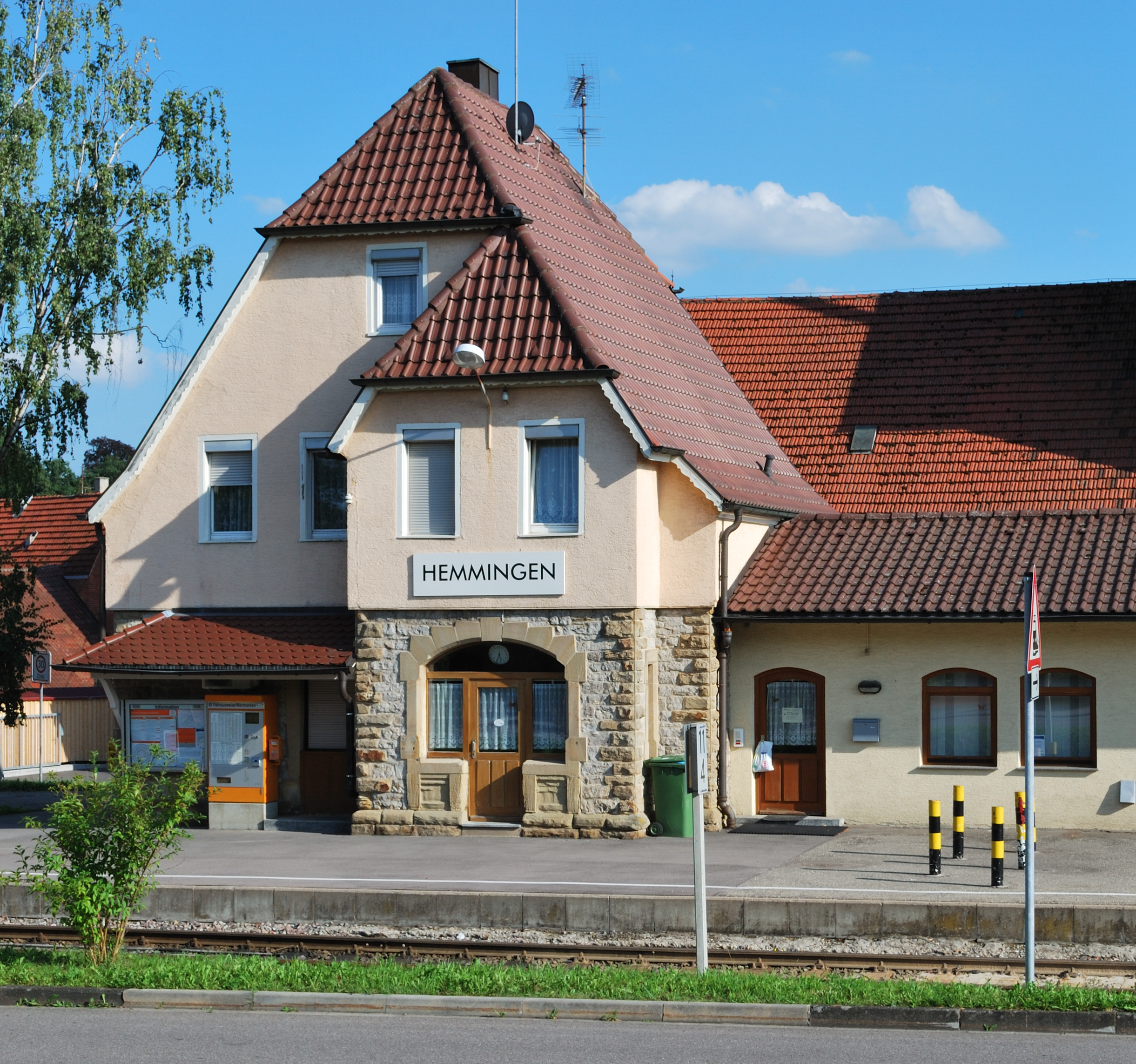
The station building at Hemmingen

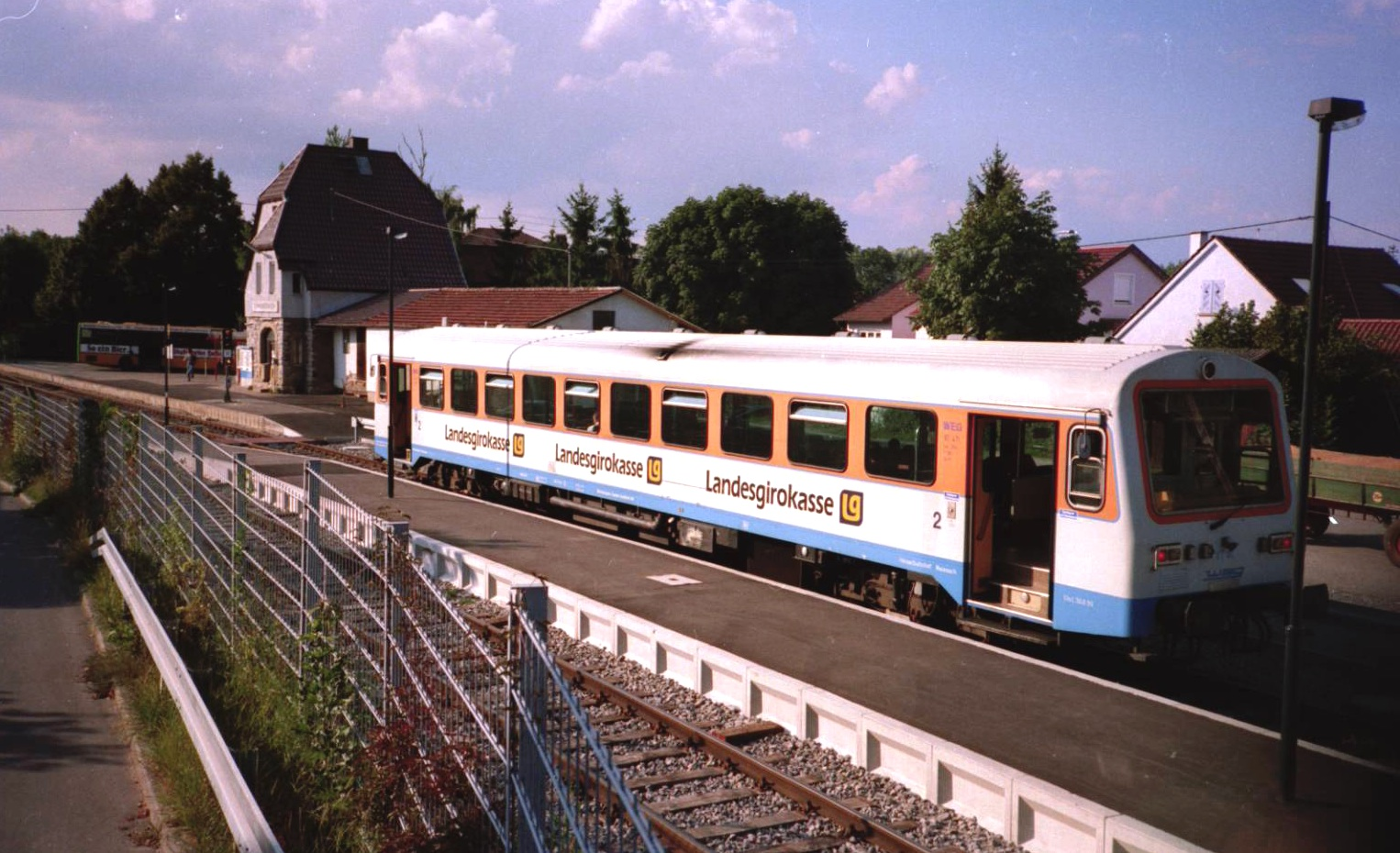
An NE 81 unit at Schwieberdingen station

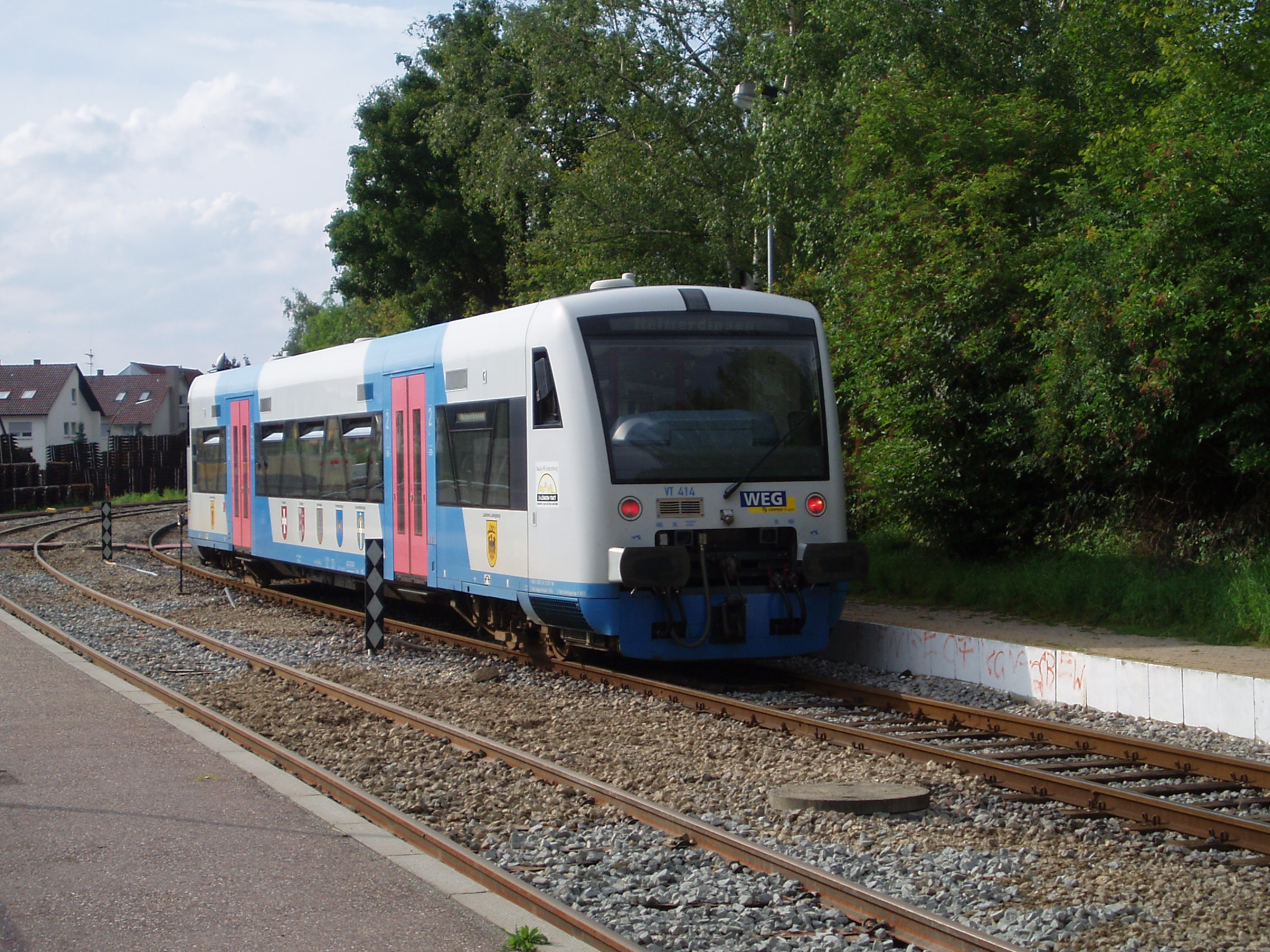
An RS1 unit in Münchingen station
