= Hemmingen, Baden-Württemberg =

German municipality

Hemmingen
- Municipality
- Coat of arms

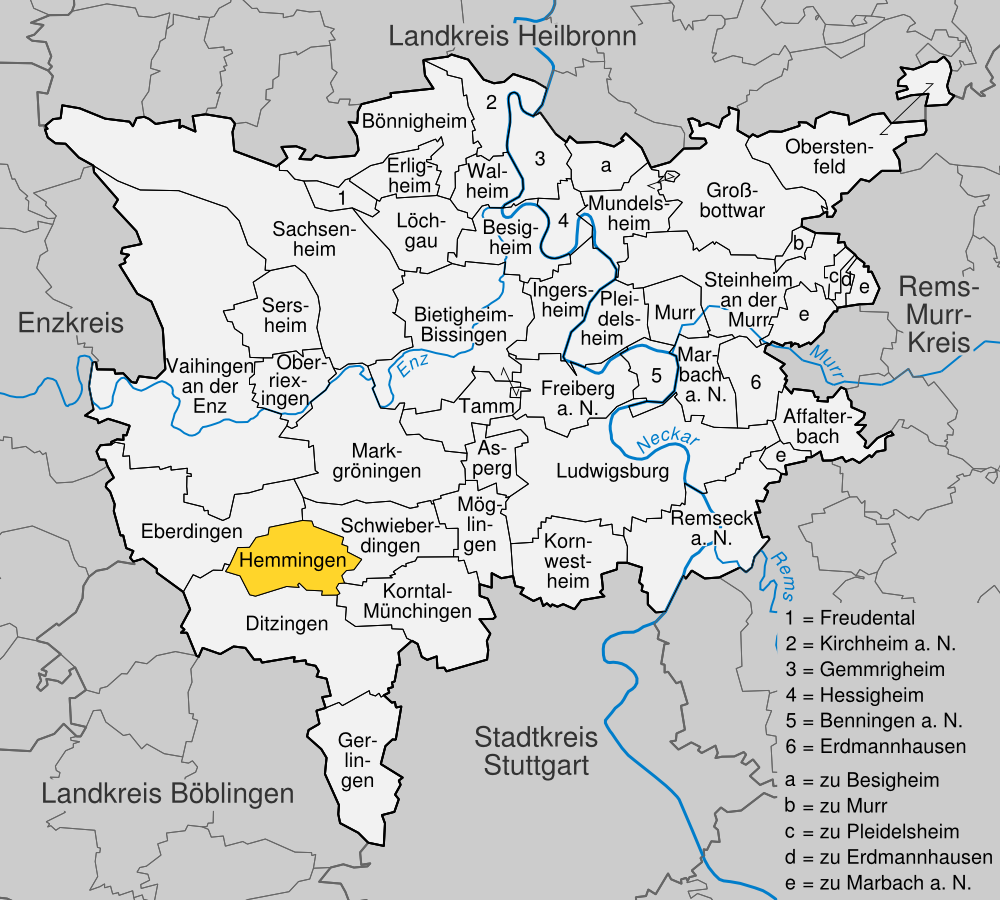
- Location of Hemmingen within Ludwigsburg district
- Interactive map of Hemmingen
- Location within Germany Location within Baden-Württemberg
- Coordinates: 48°51′58″N 9°1′55″E
- Country: Germany
- State: Baden-Württemberg
- Admin. region: Stuttgart
- District: Ludwigsburg

Area
  - Total: 12.34 km^{2} (4.76 sq mi)
- Elevation: 327 m (1,073 ft)

Population (2025-12-31)
  - Total: 7,871
  - Density: 637.8/km^{2} (1,652/sq mi)
- Time zone: UTC+01:00 (CET)
  - Summer (DST): UTC+02:00 (CEST)
- Postal codes: 71282
- Dialling codes: 07150
- Vehicle registration: LB
- Website: www.hemmingen.de

Hemmingen (German pronunciation: [ˈhɛmɪŋən]) is a municipality in the district of Ludwigsburg, Baden-Württemberg, Germany.

== History ==
The first mention of a settlement at Hemmingen's location was in 991, in document ion naming such a place as a property of Weissenburg Abbey, in Alsace. By the 13th century, Bebenhausen Monastery also had estates nearby. Hemmingen became a fiefdom of the County of Württemberg in the 14th century and control over the area was shared from 1331 to 1444. When the Lords of Nippenburg went extinct, the House of Württemberg fully inherited their holdings, which included Hemmingen.

== Geography ==
The municipality (Gemeinde) of Hemmingen is located in the district of Ludwigsburg, in Baden-Württemberg, one of the 16 States of the Federal Republic of Germany. Hemmingen is physically located in the basin of the Neckar. Elevation above sea level in the municipal area ranges from a high of 386 meters (1,266 ft) Normalnull (NN) to a low of 259 meters (850 ft) NN.

== Politics ==
Hemmingen has one borough (Ortsteil). Hemmingen, and nine villages: Bürkleshöfe, Hagmühle, Haldenhöfe, Hegnachhöfe, Rohrhöfe, Rohrsperg, Sägmühle, Seehöfe, and Spitzenhöfe. There are also three abandoned villages, Dollingen, Hochstetten, and Hofstetten, in the municipal area.

== Transportation ==
Hemmingen is connected to Germany's network of roadways by its local Landesstraßen and Kreisstraßen and to its system of railways by Strohgäu Railway. Local public transportation is provided by the Verkehrs- und Tarifverbund Stuttgart.
