= Weilimdorf =

- Borough of Stuttgart
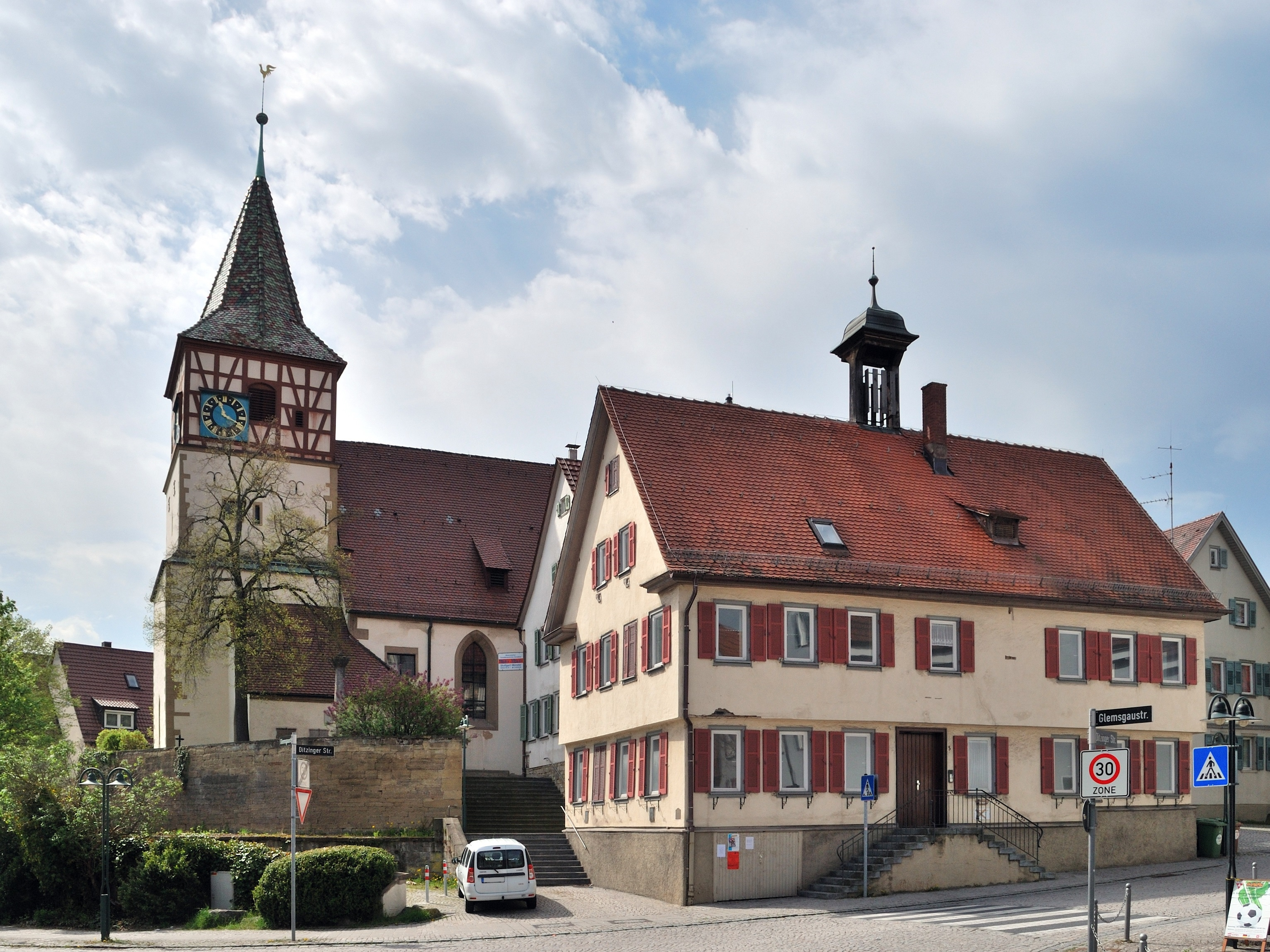
- Old town hall and Oswald Church

- Coat of arms

- Location within Stuttgart
- Interactive map of Weilimdorf
- Location within Germany Location within Baden-Württemberg
- Coordinates: 48°48′52″N 9°6′44″E
- Country: Germany
- State: Baden-Württemberg
- Admin. region: Stuttgart
- District: Stuttgart
- City: Stuttgart
- Subdivisions: Weilimdorf, Weilimdorf-North, Bergheim, Giebel, Hausen, Wolfbusch

Government
  - Mayor: Ulrike Zich

Area
  - Total: 12.6 km^{2} (4.9 sq mi)
- Elevation: 320 m (1,050 ft)

Population (2020-12-31)
  - Total: 31,673
  - Density: 2,510/km^{2} (6,510/sq mi)
- Time zone: UTC+01:00 (CET)
  - Summer (DST): UTC+02:00 (CEST)
- Postal codes: 70499
- Dialling codes: 0711
- Vehicle registration: S
- Website: www.stuttgart.de/rathaus/stadtbezirke/weilimdorf/

Weilimdorf (German pronunciation: [ˈvaɪlʔɪmdɔʁf]), until 1955 known as "Weil im Dorf", is the north-western borough (Stadtbezirk) of the German city and capital of Baden-Württemberg, Stuttgart. Weilimdorf, covering an area of 12.6 square kilometres (4.9 mi^{2}) with a population of around 30,000, borders the Stadtbezirke of Zuffenhausen, Feuerbach, Stuttgart-West, and the towns of Gerlingen, Ditzingen, and Korntal-Münchingen in the Ludwigsburg district. Weilimdorf became part of Stuttgart in 1933 amidst the hardship of the economic instability of the 30s in Germany. The city district is made up by six Stadtteile: Weilimdorf (with more than 50% of the population), Bergheim, Giebel, Hausen, Weilimdorf-Nord and Wolfbusch and is home to an expanding commercial area.

Notable architecture includes Castle Solitude, the 15th Century Oswald Church and the Löwen-Markt, the modern center of Weilimdorf.

== Geography ==
Weilimdorf, located 9.9 kilometres (6.2 mi) from Stuttgart city center, sits on the southeastern edge of the Strohgäu. The district covers an area of exactly 12.585 square kilometres (4.859 mi^{2}). Of this area, 29.4% of it is occupied by construction, another 12.3% is used by transportation, 3.9% is devoted to parks, forests stand on another 28.2%, and finally, agriculture occupies the final 28.7%.
