= Stuttgart Hauptbahnhof =

Primary railway station in Stuttgart, Baden-Württemberg, Germany

Stuttgart Hbf
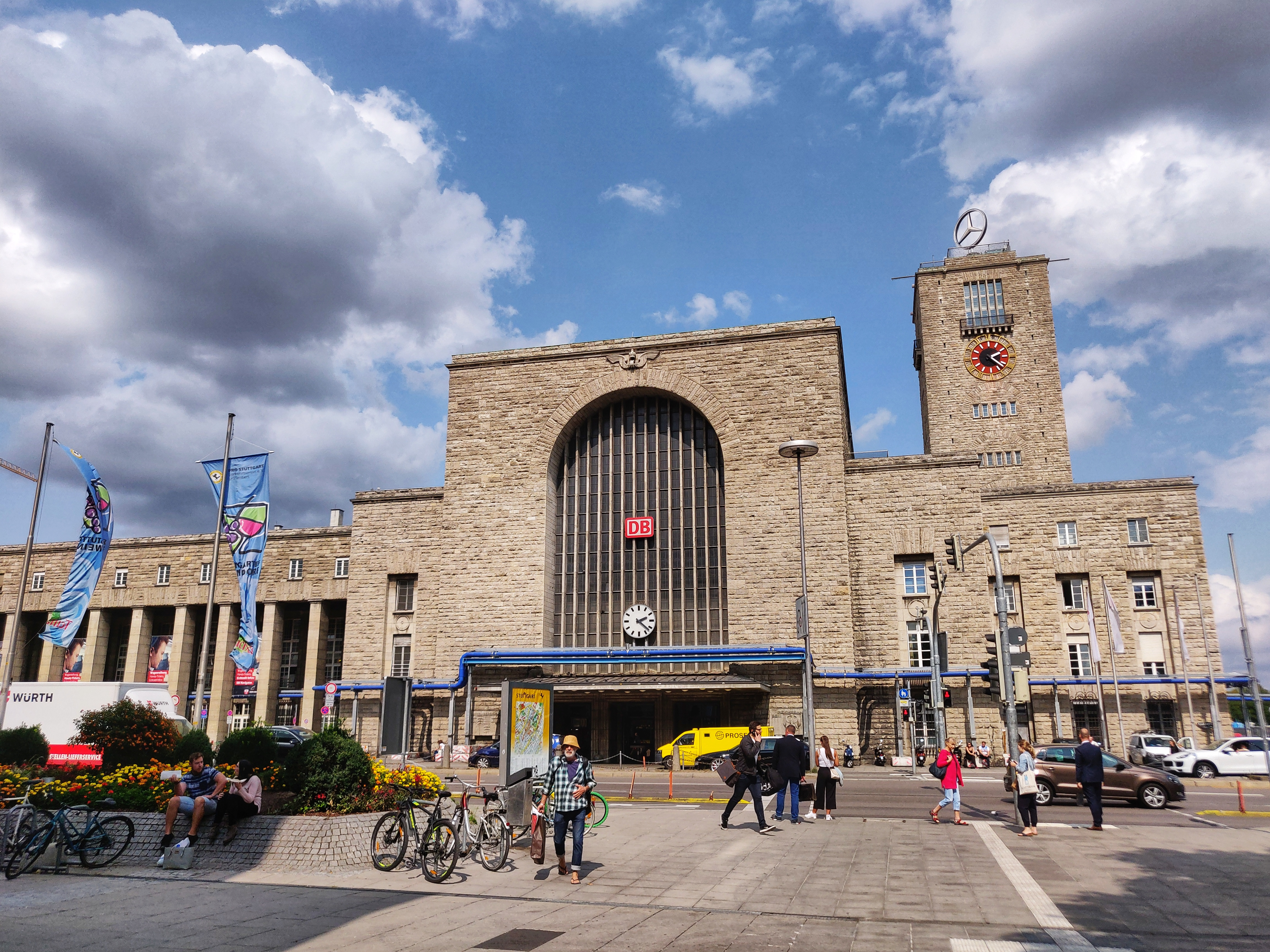
- Station building in 2018

General information
- Location: Stuttgart, Baden-Württemberg; Germany
- Coordinates: 48°47′02″N 9°10′54″E
- Owner: Deutsche Bahn
- Operator: DB Fernverkehr; DB Regio; Stuttgarter Straßenbahnen
- Lines: Fils Valley Railway (KBS 750, 790.1); Franconia Railway (KBS 780, 790.4-5); Stuttgart–Horb railway (KBS 740); S-Bahn connecting line (KBS 790.1-6)
- Platforms: 22 (16 above ground terminal, 2 S-Bahn, 4 U-Bahn)

Construction
- Accessible: Yes
- Architect: Paul Bonatz and Friedrich Eugen Scholer

Other information
- Station code: 6071
- DS100 code: TS
- IBNR: 8000096
- Category: 1
- IATA code: ZWS
- Fare zone: : 1
- Website: www.bahnhof.de

History
- Opened: 23 October 1922; 104 years ago
- Electrified: 15 May 1933; 93 years ago

Passengers
- 220,000 daily
Services
Preceding station	DB Fernverkehr	Following station
Terminus	ICE 6 Sprinter	Nürnberg Hbf towards Berlin Gesundbrunnen
Reverses direction	ICE 11	Ulm Hbf towards München Hbf
Reverses direction	ICE 11	Heidelberg Hbf towards Berlin Gesundbrunnen
Terminus	ICE 13	Wiesloch-Walldorf towards Berlin Ostbahnhof
Terminus	ICE/ECE 20	Mannheim Hbf One-way operation
Terminus	ICE/ECE 20	Heidelberg Hbf One-way operation
Terminus	ICE 22	Vaihingen (Enz) towards Hamburg Hbf
Mannheim Hbf towards Hamburg-Altona	ICE 42	Plochingen towards München Hbf
Mannheim Hbf towards Dortmund Hbf	ICE 47	Ulm Hbf towards München Hbf
Vaihingen (Enz) towards Dresden Hbf	IC 55	Terminus
Vaihingen (Enz) towards Dortmund Hbf	IC 55 Allgäu	Plochingen towards Oberstdorf
Bruchsal towards Karlsruhe Hbf or Basel Bad Bf	ICE 60	Ulm Hbf towards München Hbf
Mannheim Hbf towards Saarbrücken Hbf	ICE 60	Ulm Hbf towards München Hbf
Heidelberg Hbf towards Frankfurt (Main) Hbf	ICE 62	Ulm Hbf towards Graz Hbf
Vaihingen (Enz) towards Münster Hbf	ICE 62	Ulm Hbf towards Graz Hbf
Heidelberg Hbf towards Dortmund Hbf	ICE 62 Bodensee	Ulm Hbf towards Innsbruck Hbf
Karlsruhe Hbf towards Paris Est	ICE/TGV 83	Ulm Hbf towards München Hbf
Wiesloch-Walldorf towards Frankfurt (Main) Hbf	IC 87	Stuttgart-Vaihingen towards Zürich HB or Konstanz
Wiesloch-Walldorf towards Frankfurt (Main) Hbf	IC 87	Böblingen towards Zürich HB or Konstanz
Terminus	IC 87 only IC 460/461	Ulm Hbf towards Wien Hbf
Heidelberg Hbf towards Frankfurt (Main) Hbf	ICE 89	Ulm Hbf towards St. Anton am Arlberg
Mannheim Hbf towards Frankfurt (Main) Hbf	ICE/RJX 90	Ulm Hbf towards Wien Hbf or Budapest Nyugati
Preceding station		Following station
Heidelberg Hbf towards Berlin Hbf	FLX 10	Terminus
Preceding station		Following station
Vaihingen (Enz) towards Karlsruhe Hbf	RE 1	Schorndorf towards Aalen Hbf
Terminus	RE 8	Ludwigsburg towards Würzburg Hbf
Terminus	RE 90	Stuttgart-Bad Cannstatt towards Nürnberg Hbf
Terminus	MEX 13	Stuttgart-Bad Cannstatt towards Crailsheim
Terminus	MEX 16	Stuttgart-Bad Cannstatt towards Ulm Hbf
Preceding station	DB Regio Baden-Württemberg	Following station
Terminus	RE 6a	Reutlingen Hbf towards Aulendorf
Terminus	RE 6b	Reutlingen Hbf towards Rottenburg
Böblingen towards Singen (Hohentwiel)	RE 4	Terminus
Terminus	RE 5	Esslingen (Neckar) towards Lindau-Reutin
Böblingen towards Rottweil	RE 14a	Terminus
Böblingen towards Freudenstadt Hbf	RE 14b	Terminus
Terminus	MEX 19	Stuttgart-Bad Cannstatt towards Schwäbisch Hall-Hessental or Crailsheim
Terminus	MEX 90	Stuttgart-Bad Cannstatt towards Schwäbisch Hall-Hessental
Preceding station	(Stuttgart)	Following station
Terminus	RE 6	Reutlingen Hbf towards Tübingen Hbf
Stuttgart-Bad Cannstatt towards Tübingen Hbf	MEX 12	Ludwigsburg towards Mosbach-Neckarelz
Ludwigsburg towards Heidelberg Hbf	RE 17b	Terminus
Ludwigsburg towards Karlsruhe Hbf or Bad Wildbad	MEX 17a	Terminus
Ludwigsburg towards Bruchsal	RB 17c	Terminus
Stuttgart-Bad Cannstatt towards Tübingen Hbf	MEX 18	Ludwigsburg towards Osterburken
Preceding station	Croatian Railways	Following station
Terminus	EuroNight	Göppingen towards Zagreb
Preceding station	SVG Stuttgart	Following station
Terminus	FEX Bodensee II	Böblingen towards Konstanz
Terminus	FEX Südbahn	Plochingen towards Singen
Preceding station	Stuttgart S-Bahn	Following station
Hauptbahnhof (tief)
Stadtmitte towards Herrenberg	S1	Bad Cannstatt towards Kirchheim (Teck)
Stadtmitte towards Filderstadt	S2	Bad Cannstatt towards Schorndorf
Stadtmitte towards Flughafen/Messe	S3	Bad Cannstatt towards Backnang
Stadtmitte towards Schwabstraße	S4	Nordbahnhof towards Backnang
Stadtmitte towards Schwabstraße	S5	Nordbahnhof towards Bietigheim-Bissingen
Stadtmitte towards Schwabstraße	S6	Nordbahnhof towards Weil der Stadt
Stadtmitte towards Schwabstraße	S60	Nordbahnhof towards Böblingen
Preceding station	Stuttgart Stadtbahn	Following station
Hauptbahnhof (Arnulf-Klett-Platz)
Schlossplatz towards Leinfelden Neuer Markt	U5	Stadtbibliothek towards Killesberg
Schlossplatz towards Flughafen/Messe	U6	Stadtbibliothek towards Gerlingen
Schlossplatz towards Nellingen Ostfildern	U7	Stadtbibliothek towards Mönchfeld
Börsenplatz towards Botnang	U9	Staatsgalerie towards Hedelfingen
Schlossplatz towards Dürrlewang	U12	Budapester Platz towards Neckargröningen Remseck
Schlossplatz towards Heumaden	U15	Stadtbibliothek towards Stammheim
Preceding station	Stuttgarter Historische Straßenbahnen	Following station
Berliner Platz One-way operation	Oldtimerlinie 21	Neckartor towards Straßenbahnmuseum
Location

Stuttgart Hauptbahnhof (German pronunciation: [ˈʃtʊtɡaʁt ˈhaʊ̯ptbaːnˌhoːf]; English: Stuttgart Central Station) is the primary railway station in the city of Stuttgart, the state capital of Baden-Württemberg, in southwestern Germany. It is the largest regional and long-distance railway station in Stuttgart, the main node of the Stuttgart S-Bahn network, and, together with the station at Charlottenplatz, it is the main node of the Stuttgart Stadtbahn.

Located at the northeastern end of the Königstraße, the main pedestrian zone of the city centre, the main line station still is a terminus, whilst the subterranean S-Bahn and Stadtbahn stations are through-stations. The station is well known for its 12-storey tower with a large, rotating and illuminated Mercedes-Benz star insignia on top; the tower and station building are city landmarks.

Terminus station and Stuttgart 21 underground through-station, with white pedestrian bridge over the pit providing access to 16 platforms

Currently, as part of the Stuttgart 21 project, which is also very controversial among the population, the train station is being converted from an above-ground terminus station into an underground through station. These works include the demolition of the side wings of the building, together with the elimination of the platforms, tracks, and apron of the terminus station. The planned underground through station is configured at a 90-degree angle to the present station. The construction started in 2010 and is scheduled to end in 2027.

In November 2009, preservationists of the International Council on Monuments and Sites nominated the building for inclusion in UNESCO's World Cultural Heritage list, an occasion that opponents of the Stuttgart 21 project picked to urge the city and Deutsche Bahn to stop the project which implies demolition of parts of the complex designed by Paul Bonatz.

== History ==
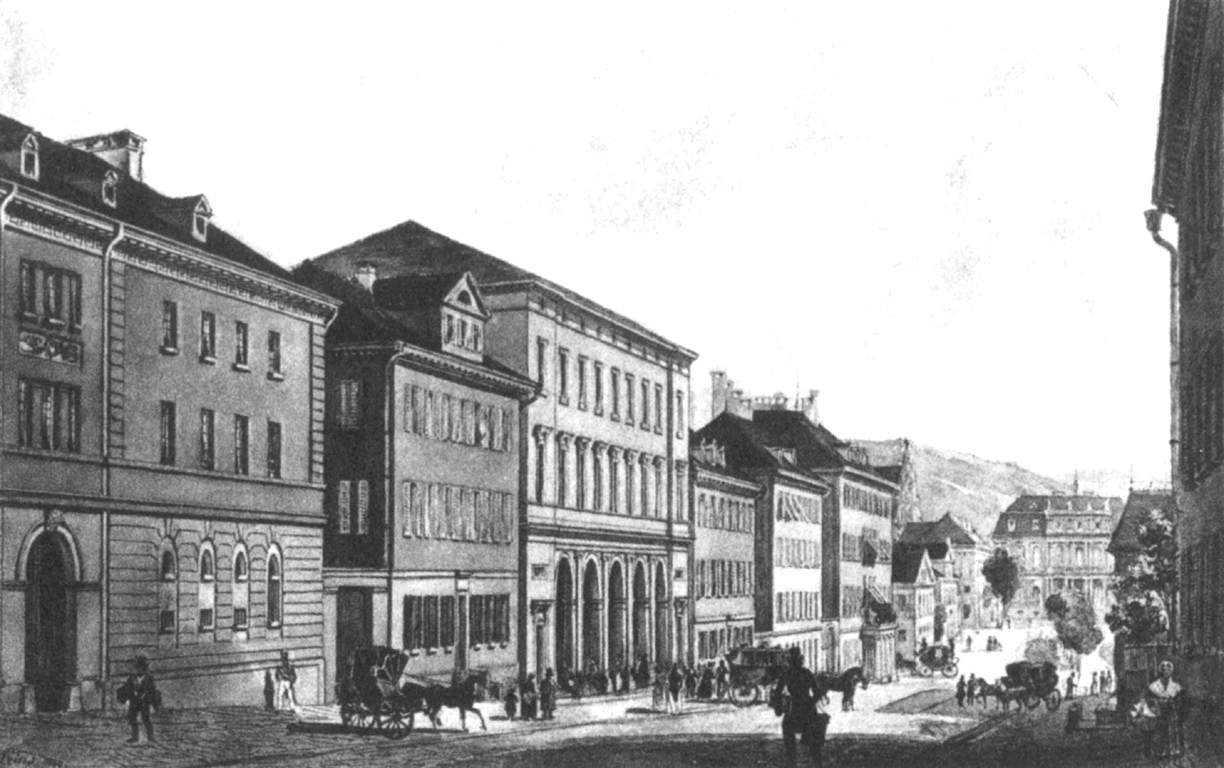
The third building from the left in the picture shows the facade, with the entrance area under the arcades, the first Stuttgart central station, after a plan by the architect Karl Etzel Karl Etzel (about 1850)

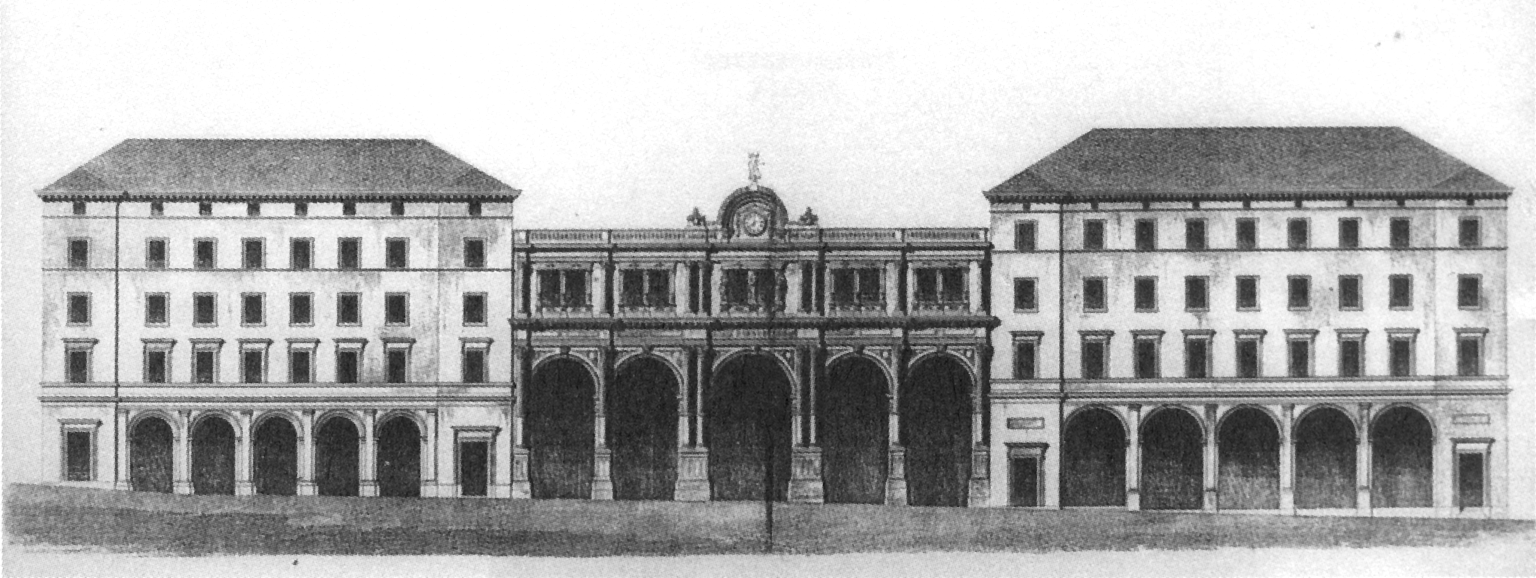
Elevation of the station, after the first station reconstruction (1867), seen from Schlossstraße

=== First and second Centralbahnhof ===
Until 1922, the central station (Centralbahnhof or Zentralbahnhof) was located on the Schlosstrasse (the precise location of the former station is on what is today called the Bolzstrasse), near the Schlossplatz. The first station building, a terminus station with 4 tracks, was built by Karl Etzel for the opening of the Württemberg Central Railway (Zentralbahn), with its two branches to Ludwigsburg and Esslingen.

The wooden station hall was not unusual at the time and covered four tracks. The first train, arrived at the station from Canstatt on 26 September 1846. The first phase of railway construction in the Kingdom of Württemberg, with routes to Heilbronn, Bretten, Ulm, and Friedrichshafen, was completed by 1854.

Due to increasing railway traffic, the first building was replaced by new construction at the same spot in the 1860s. Between 1863 and 1867, the engineers Klein, Georg Morlok, Carl Julius Abel and later city architect Adolf Wolff created this second station, with 8 tracks, featuring a building with grandiose arches in the Renaissance Revival style. Parts of the façade of this building are now part of the Metropol, an events centre and cinema complex.

=== Sprickerhof through station ===
With a steadily increasing traffic volume and the connection of additional lines, the station had increasingly reached its capacity limits in the early 20th century.

By 1905, there were three designs for the redevelopment of the station:

- the so-called Sprickerhofsche Durchgangsbahnhof (Sprickerhof through station),
- a terminal station on Bolzstraße (then Schloßstraße), and
- a terminal station on Schillerstraße.

The concept of Sprickerhof through station was introduced in 1901. The Stuttgart–Horb railway (Gäu Railway) and the line from Feuerbach were to run through the Kriegsberg (a hill to the northwest of the current station) to the central station in three parallel twin-track tunnels at a gradient of 1:100 from Wolframstraße in an arc with a radius of 300 metres (984 ft 3 in). This would have run to Bahnhofstraße via Kriegsbergstraße and the tracks would have been in the area of the road to Ludwigsburg. The crossover tracks would have run into the tunnel for about 150 metres (492 ft 2 in). The entrance building would have been built in the area of the main customs office. The above-ground areas between Schloßstraße and Schillerstraße would have been demolished for this project. A commission of external experts opposed the project.

=== The current Hauptbahnhof ===
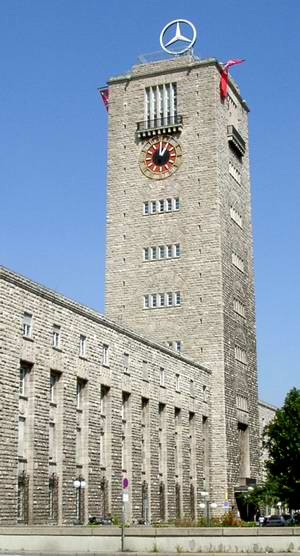
The station tower of the Hauptbahnhof in 2004

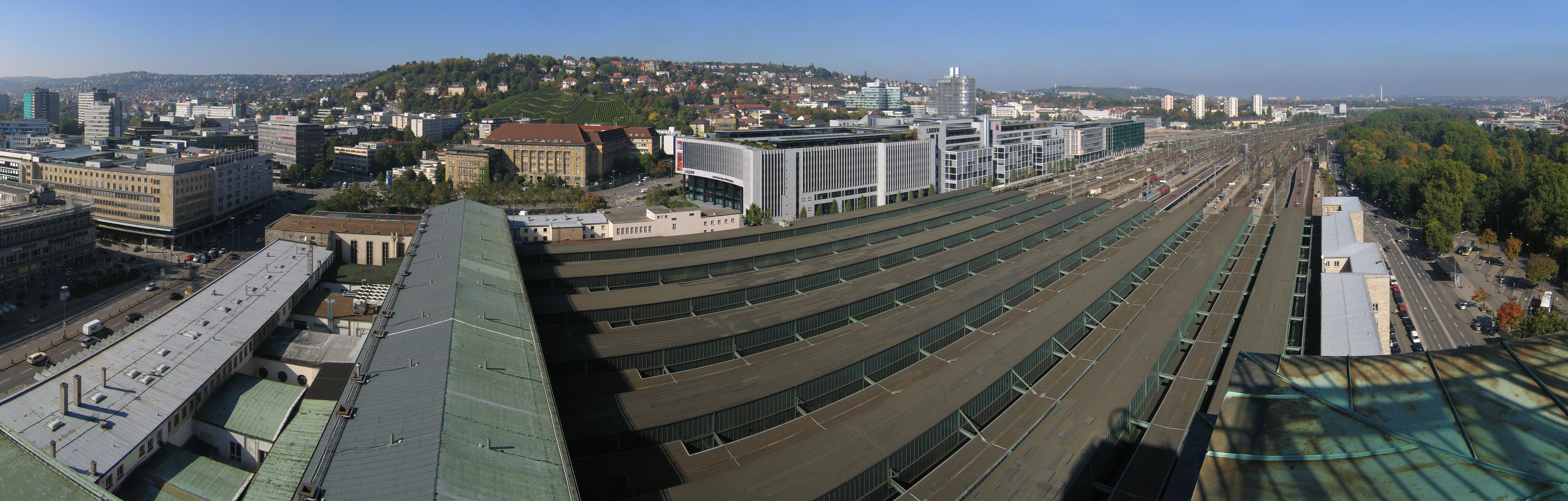
View from the station tower onto the platforms

The present Hauptbahnhof was built between 1914 and 1928 on the street now called Arnulf-Klett-Platz, only about 500 metres (1,600 ft) east of the former station.

In 1910, the Royal Württemberg State Railways (Königlich Württembergischen Staats-Eisenbahnen or K.W.St.E.) financed an architectural contest, which drew 70 participants. The competition was won by the architects Paul Bonatz and Friedrich Eugen Scholer with their plans for umbilicus sueviae—the Navel of Swabia. After undergoing numerous changes, including moving the station tower from the main façade to the wing at the Schlossgarten, construction began in 1914 on Cannstatter Strasse. Changes to the plan also occurred in the construction phase. Due to the route of the tracks to the old station, construction needed to be done in two phases, with the first stage, including tracks 9 to 16, going into service on 22 October 1922. The tracks to the old station were cut at the same time.

As further construction of the new station was delayed for financial reasons, the city of Stuttgart loaned Deutsche Reichsbahn two million Reichsmark (equivalent in current values to €8.6 million) in 1925 and a further loan of 5 million Reichsmark (equivalent to €19.7 million) in 1927. The second stage was completed in 1928 and the electrification of the 16 tracks was completed on 15 May 1933.

In the bombing of Stuttgart in the Second World War, the Hauptbahnhof was severely damaged several times, although from 1940 to 1942 a decoy target at Lauffen am Neckar diverted many raids. The reconstruction took several years. Stuttgart Hauptbahnhof has been listed as a cultural heritage site of special significance (under section 12 of the Baden-Württemberg heritage protection act) since 20 August 1987.

=== S-Bahn and Stadtbahn ===
A plan developed in the mid-1950s for a S-Bahn proposed a four-track station with two 175-metre (574 ft)-long island platforms under the Hauptbahnhof, which would be linked by two tracks towards the city centre and four towards Feuerbach/Bad Cannstatt.

Between 1971 and 1978, an underground Hauptbahnhof station was built for the S-Bahn in the central Neckar area, which was a cut-and-cover construction under the main hall in the area of the small ticket hall. This station has two tracks and an island platform. The first S-Bahn services ran on 1 October 1978.

After four years of planning, construction commenced on a new central signalling centre of class SpDrL 60 at the Hauptbahnhof on 3 October 1973. The signalling infrastructure was gradually put into operation: first for the train depot on 1 and 2 October 1977, then for the passenger station and freight yard on 5 and 6 November 1977 respectively. The S-Bahn connecting line was opened as far as the former terminus at Schwabstraße on 1 October 1978.

A total of 95 stop signals, 93 distant signals, 583 shunting signals, 506 point machines, 530 track circuits and 169 axle counters were integrated into the track layout. The new signalling centre replaced twelve old signal boxes. DM 68 million was spent on the signalling centre and its outdoor facilities. Today, five to seven dispatchers work in the signalling centre.

The underground Stadtbahn station, called Hauptbahnhof (Arnulf-Klett-Platz), in front of the station hall under Arnulf-Klett-Platz was opened to traffic on 9 April 1976. Today, ten Stuttgart Stadtbahn lines serve the station.

The S-Bahn station was used (as of 1993) by about 120,000 passengers per day. This included 55,000 transfers to long-distance, regional and Stadtbahn services, about 15,000 passengers transferring between the S-Bahn lines via Feuerbach and Bad Cannstatt and around 50,000 passengers entering or exiting at the station. The Stadtbahn station was used by around 75,000 passengers a day. In 2016, 140,000 passengers used the S-Bahn station each day. With the commissioning of Stuttgart 21, the volume is expected to decline by about 20 percent. The S-Bahn station is called Stuttgart Hbf tief (deep) and is 20 m (66 ft) below the Hauptbahnhof.

== Building ==
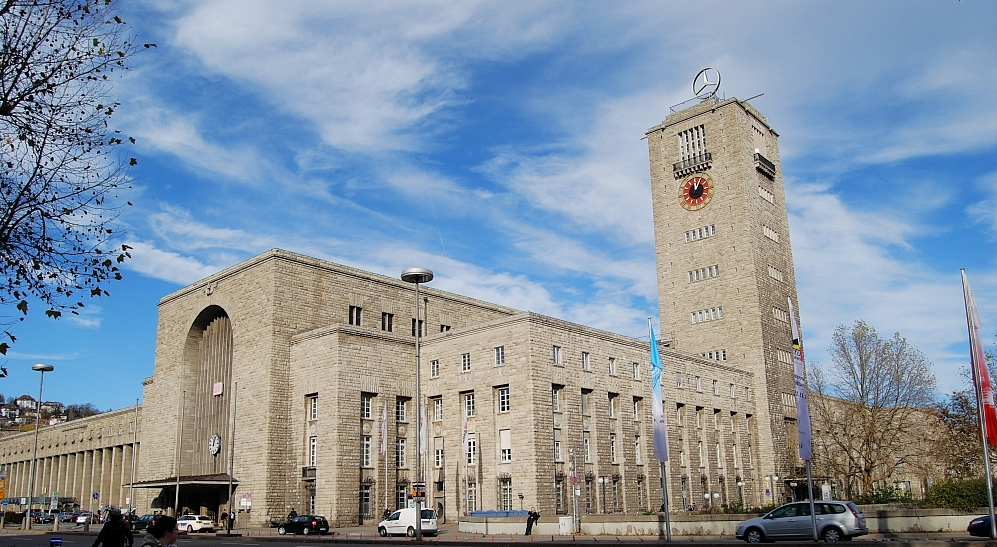
Station building in 2010

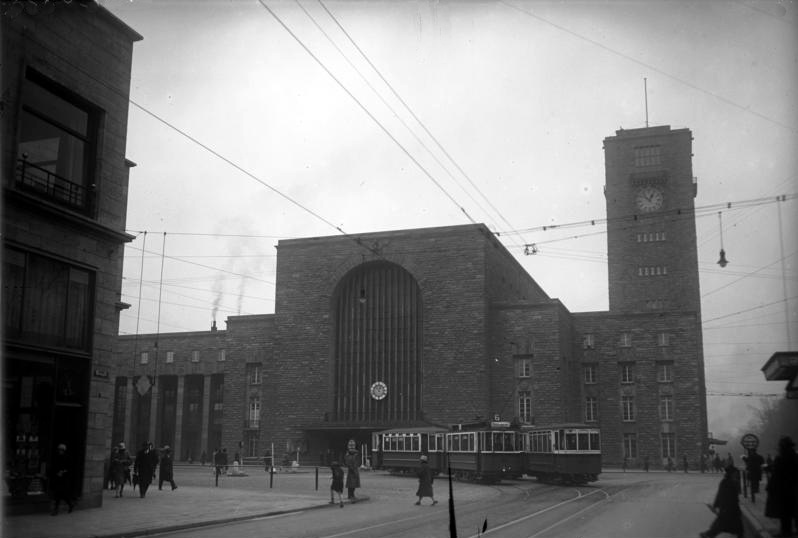
Large ticket hall from Königstraße in 1927

The station building consists of cubes nested symmetrically and asymmetrically. It is characterised by cubes of different size, dimension and design. Concrete and steel were used during the construction of the station building and the rough-hewn Muschelkalk ("mussel chalk") blocks were laid as a facade over bricks. The Muschelkalk comes from the Trochitenkalk Formation of the Upper Muschelkalk from the Crailsheim area. Inside, sandstone, tuff and brick dominate the walls. These are partly designed as flat wooden ceilings and partly designed as reinforced concrete structures. The pillars in the terminal station hall are made of exposed concrete.

The station is also integrated into the urban planning of the city of Stuttgart. The structure adapts to the sloping terrain (there is a difference in height of almost five metres between the tower and the north exit). The original plans called for a road leading directly to the building, but Bonatz eliminated this in favour of the Lautenschlagerstraße, as it is now known, which ends at the Kleine Schalterhalle (small ticket hall). The tracks for the local commuter traffic are behind this hall and the central exit is between the hall and the main building, which is useful for the control of passenger flow. Underneath the tracks area, three tunnels running at right angles to the tracks provide highly functional access points: the mail tunnel runs from the post office annex to the northwestern station area, a passenger tunnel eases the task of changing platforms and a third tunnel is meant for the transit of express freight.

The building is characterized by both conservative elements, evident in its monumentality and ornamentation, and progressive features, such as its compositional principles, predominantly flat roofs, and other elements. Its design is considered an important example of the Stuttgart School. Mihály Kubinszky describes it as one of "the most successful and significant railway stations of its time," Gottfried Knapp calls it "the most important railway station building between Historicism and Modernism." Carroll Meeks explains that the fact that the station was the final destination for 95% of passengers necessitated a durable and solid building design. As construction progressed, the style became simpler and harsher. From today's perspective, it appears like "Nazi design avant la lettre." The writer W.G. Sebald writes: "… Stuttgart, that natural stone bastion designed by the architect Paul Bonatz, as I later learned, before the First World War and soon thereafter completed, which in its angular brutalism already foreshadowed some of what was to come later…"

Christoph Ingenhoven, the architect of the new station, expressed the opinion that much of Bonatz's original visions, which tended towards "a knight's castle or Valhalla", can still be found in the current building. The Stuttgart Regional Court, in its decision to permit the demolition of the side wings, stated that only the terminal train shed, the tower, the ticket halls and the portico were decisive for the architectural recognition of the work, but not the side wings.

=== Tracks and platforms ===
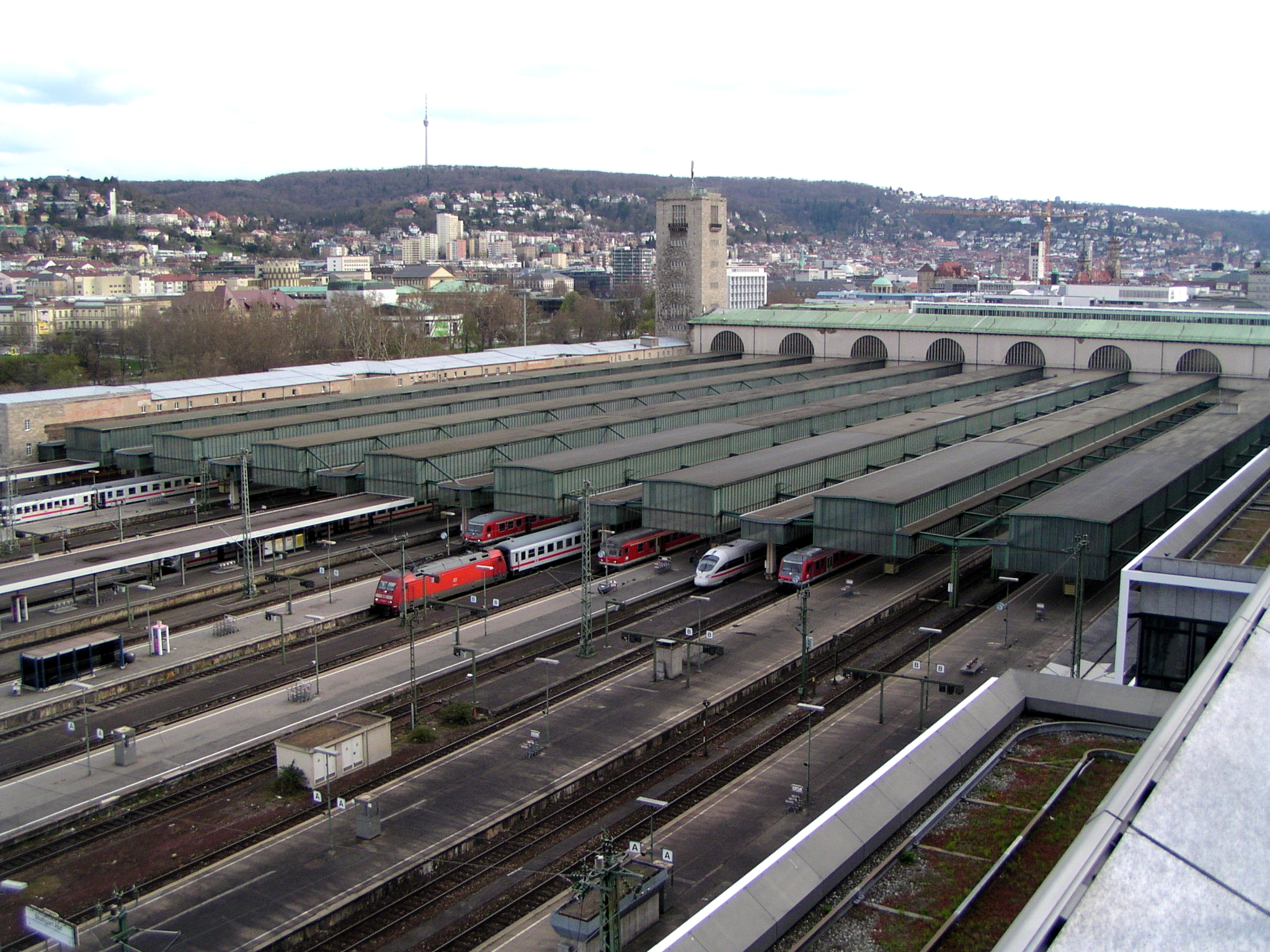
View of the back of the station in March 2008

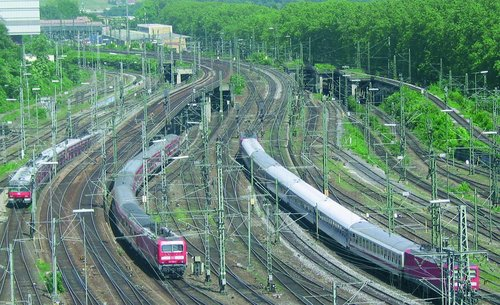
Railway tracks of the station including flying junctions

Since the existing tracks to the old station continued in use until the commissioning of the new one, the competition plan proposed, at the suggestion of the Generaldirektion der Staats-Eisenbahnen (General Headquarters of the State Railways), the building of a three-span train shed. This plan was later changed to low canopies over each platforms with slots above the tracks to allow smoke to escape and the roof supports were placed on the luggage platforms. Due to the shortage of materials after the First World War, the canopies planned for tracks 1 to 16 were not executed in steel, but in wood. After the destruction in the Second World War, new canopies were built on reinforced concrete bases. During the construction of the ramp for the Stuttgart S-Bahn from 1971 to 1974, tracks 1 to 3 were not available and a platform was built on track 1a as a replacement. In preparation for the Stuttgart 21 project, the platforms were extended towards the track apron from May 2010 and track 1a was removed in September 2010.

Services on lines S1 to S6 and S60 of the Stuttgart S-Bahn stop on two tracks (tracks 101 and 102) in the underground S-Bahn station (third basement). Southbound S-Bahn services towards Schwabstraße and the airport stop on track 101, while northbound services towards Bad Cannstatt and Stuttgart North stop on 102.

The track apron connects five tracks of the regional and long-distance traffic (one track towards the Gäu Railway and two tracks each towards Bad Cannstatt and Feuerbach) with the station tracks; five further tracks connect the station with the storage facility at Rosenstein Park. The set of tracks is protected as an object of cultural heritage under the Baden-Württemberg heritage act, although this protection will be removed after the completion of Stuttgart 21.

The necessary flying junctions were built according to plans by Karl Schaechterle between 1908 and 1914. At the opening of the station, it had two dispatcher's signal boxes: Signal box 1 provided routings for tracks 1 to 4 to and from the suburban tracks to Cannstatt and for tracks 4 to 7 to and from the suburban tracks to Feuerbach. Signal box 2 provided routings for the tracks for long-distance traffic. Entry and exit of trains to the Gäu Railway and their exit to the mainline tracks to Feuerbach was possible from tracks 7 to 12. The entrance of trains from the long-distance tracks from Cannstatt was possible on tracks 8 to 13. The entrance of long-distance services from Feuerbach and the exit of long-distance services to Cannstatt was possible on tracks 12 to 16. In addition, there were other signal boxes for connecting to the storage yard (signal boxes 3 and 5) and the freight yard (signal box 4).

In 1977, the signal boxes were replaced by a central signalling centre to the south of track 16. Since then there have been standard routes to and from the S-Bahn tracks to Bad Cannstatt from tracks 1 to 6 as well as from and to the S-Bahn tunnel and Zuffenhausen from and to tracks 3 to 12. Entrance from the mainline tracks from Zuffenhausen to tracks 3 to 16 is possible, as is exit towards Zuffenhausen from tracks 3 to 12. Moves from the long-distance tracks from Bad Cannstatt can continue to tracks 12 to 16 and entrances from those tracks is possible to tracks 8 to 13 across the tracks.

Altogether, Stuttgart station has over 140 kilometres (87 mi) of railway tracks and 385 sets of points on 82 hectares (200 acres) of land.

The aboveground platforms are 76 centimetres (30 in)-high and usually 8.45 m (27 ft 9 in)-wide and have lengths varying between 326 metres (1,070 ft) (platforms 7, 13 and 14) and 470 metres (1,540 ft) (platforms 8, 15 and 16). The S-Bahn platform (tracks 101/102) is 96 centimetres (38 in) high and 280 metres (920 ft) long.

The underground S-Bahn station is preceded by a 700-metre (2,300 ft)-long ramp on a 3.2 percent grade, which passes under the track and platform facilities of the main station over a length of around 500 metres (1,600 ft).

=== Station tower ===
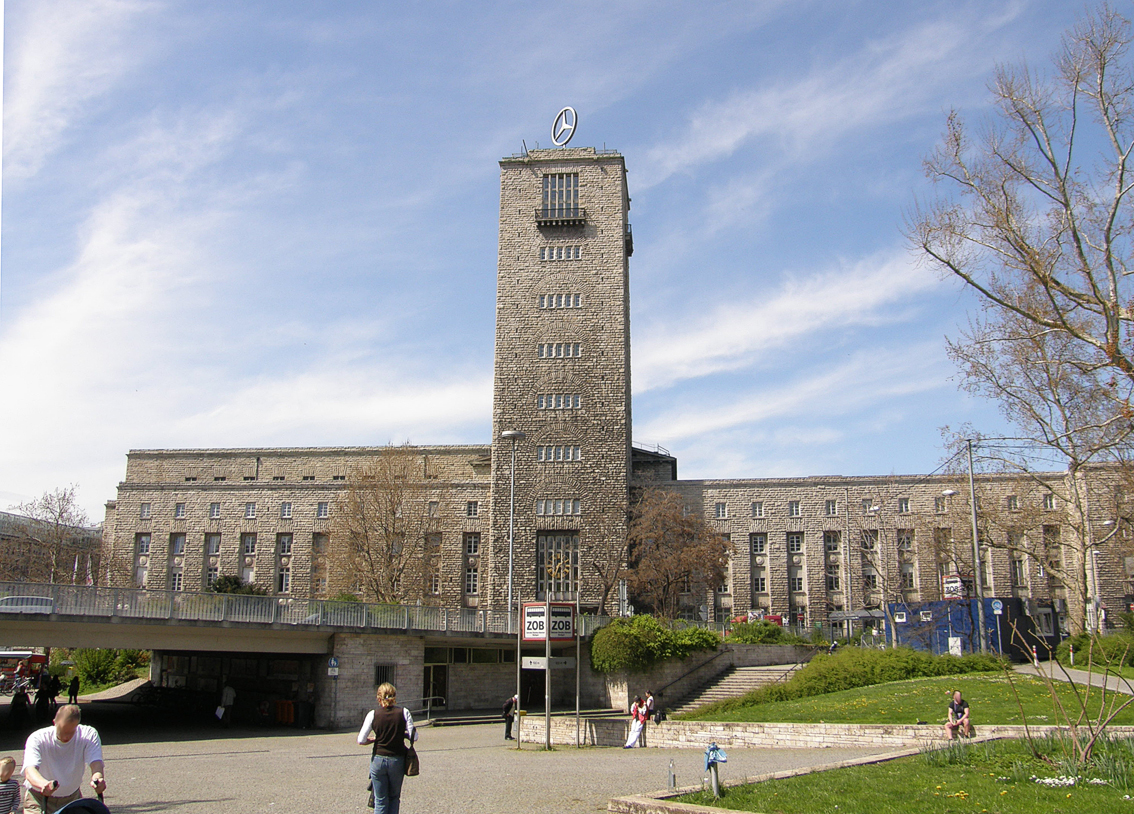
Station tower (before 2010, seen from the Mittleren Schlossgarten)

The 56-metre (184 ft)-high station tower is a landmark of the city of Stuttgart and marks the end of Königstraße. It is founded on 288–290 piles with a length of between 10 and 11 metres. It is disputed whether the piles are made of reinforced concrete or oak, but Deutsche Bahn refused to commission test bores, as according to a report the station tower stands on reinforced concrete piles and the resolution of the issue has no decisive importance for the construction of Stuttgart 21. When completed in 1916, the tower only provided a restaurant on the top floor and a waiting room for King William II. In 1926, the café run by Eugen Bürkle (with a boardroom, tea room, wine bar, dining room and rooftop restaurant) was advertised with the slogan "The most beautiful station restaurant rooms in Germany". After the Second World War, when the tower suffered little damage, a rotating Mercedes star with a diameter of five metres was installed on the turret roof in 1952 and still marks the building's silhouette. The advertising revenue was used for the reconstruction of the station. From 1955 to 1976, the station tower was used as a hotel and at times as accommodation for rail employees. The Turmforum (tower forum) Stuttgart 21 project information display has been established on four levels since 1998. The Stuttgart-Mitte registry office has carried out marriages in the conference room on level 9 since 2000. In addition, a bistro and a viewing terrace (lift and entrance free) is located in the tower. The tower clock has a dial with a diameter of 5.5 metres (18 ft).

=== Terminal station hall ===
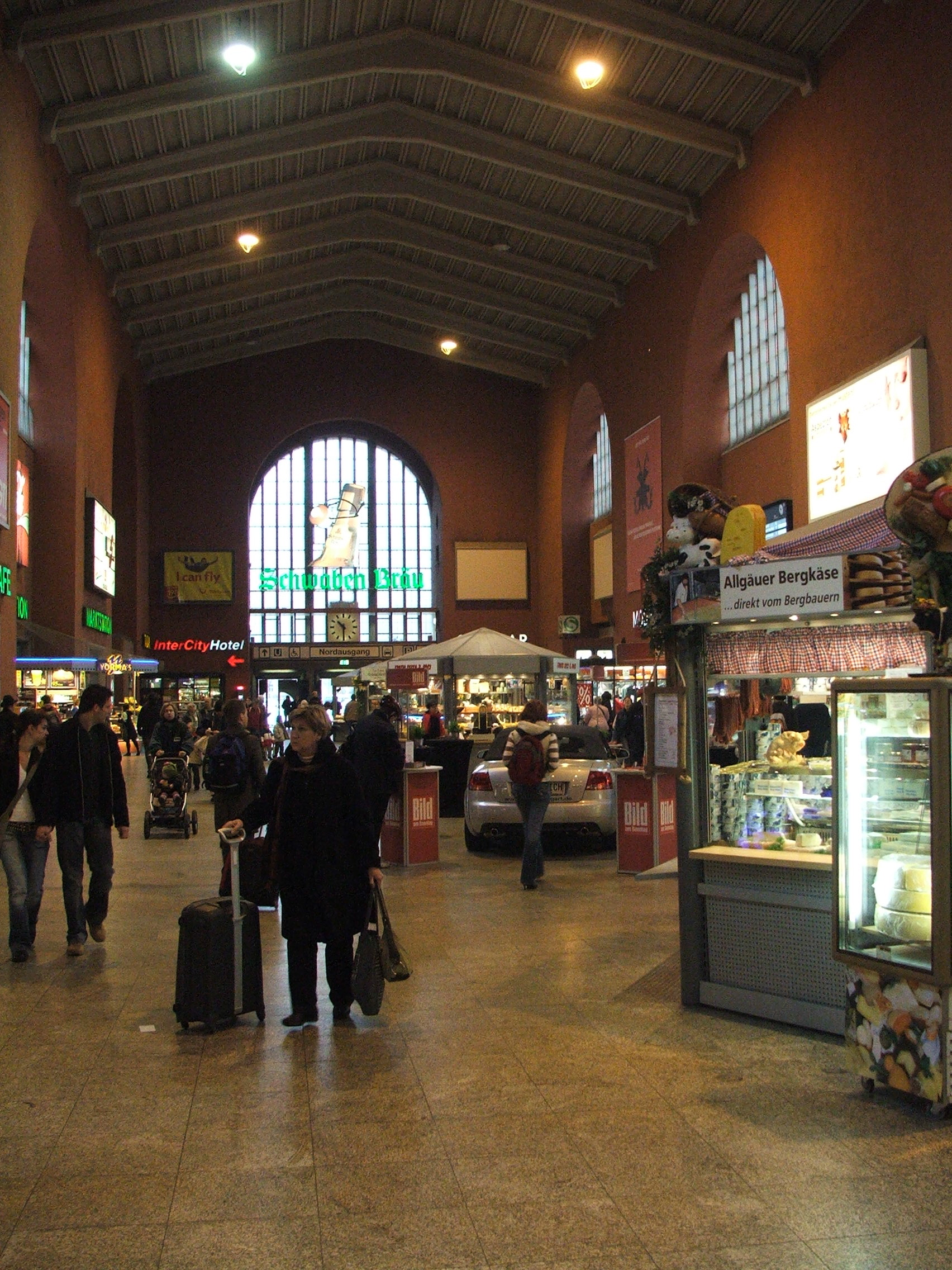
Terminal station hall in 2007, looking towards northern exit

The terminal station hall connects directly to the cross-platform hall at the end of platforms tracks 1 to 16. The terminal station hall was built with a reinforced concrete wall on the side near the platforms to reduce the effects of a possible brake failure. The eight arches leading to the cross-platform hall are divided into three parts: at the top they each have a window forming a round arch, the middle parts that are at the level of the platform canopies are solid and are built to full width in their lower parts, while at the bottom of each arch there is a passage to the cross-platform hall, which originally had a platform gate. A similar arrangement can be found on the opposite side, towards the city. The original ceiling was destroyed during the Second World War and the current ceiling was completed in 1950.

Originally there were waiting rooms and restaurants, separated by class, between the small and large ticket halls on the side facing away from the tracks. Some of the 40 shops and catering services that are now occupy the station were inserted in the terminal station hall, while the others are accessible from it. The building ends with an arcade to Arnulf-Klett-Platz.

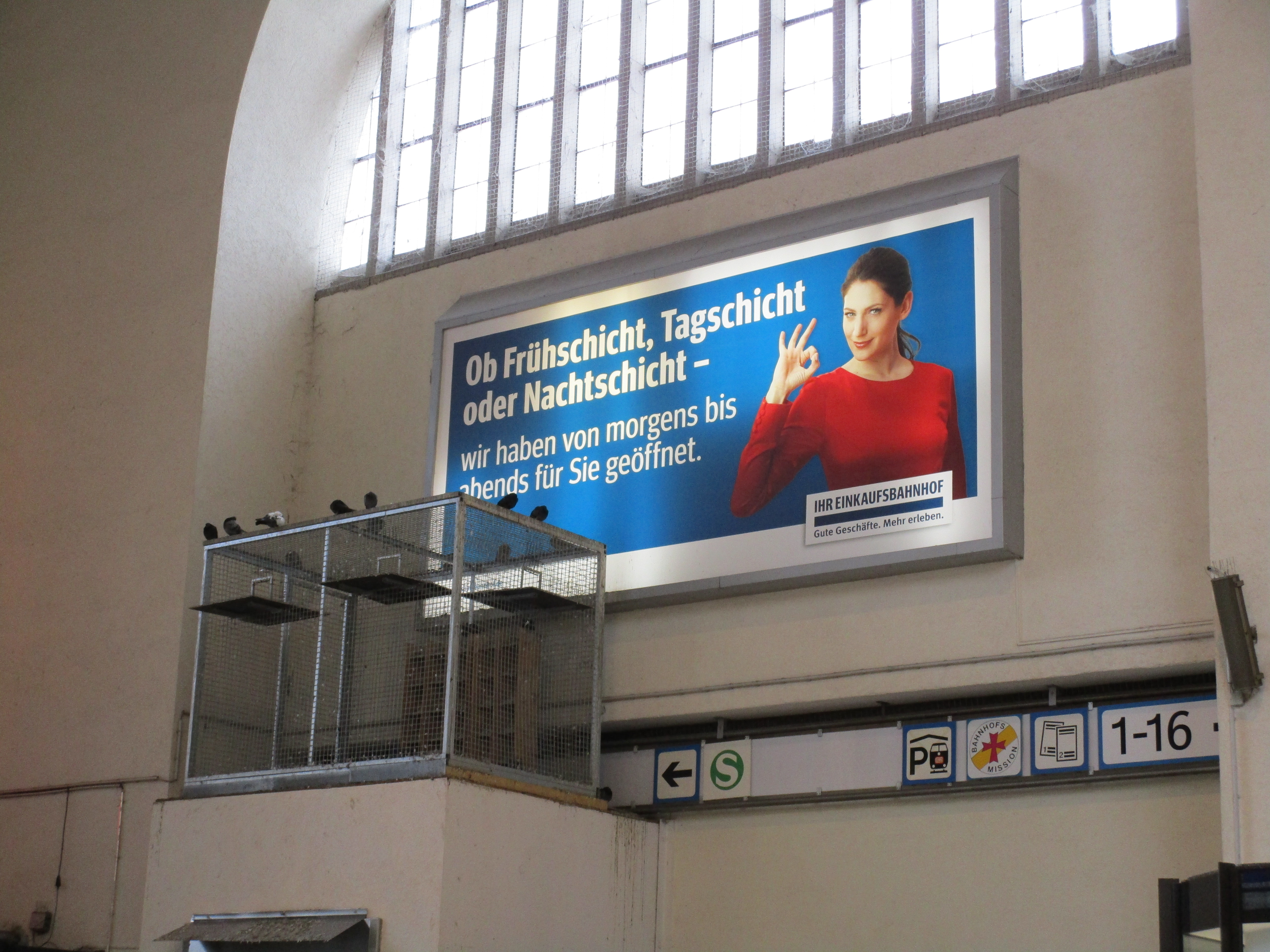
Dovecote for feral pigeons

A raised wire cage has been erected in the hall as a dovecote that serves to limit the propagation of feral pigeons.

In the course of the Stuttgart 21 project, the passageways that now lead to the cross-platform hall are to be closed by a glass structure, but the basic tripartite division of the round arches is to be retained. On the side facing the city, the wall panels in the middle of the arches are to be partially removed in order to illuminate the offices behind. Two future staircases and three skylights are to be created for the distribution level below the aboveground station hall so that the station hall will remain "accessible and experienceable." However, with the loss of its current function, it will also lose some of its significance.

==== North exit ====
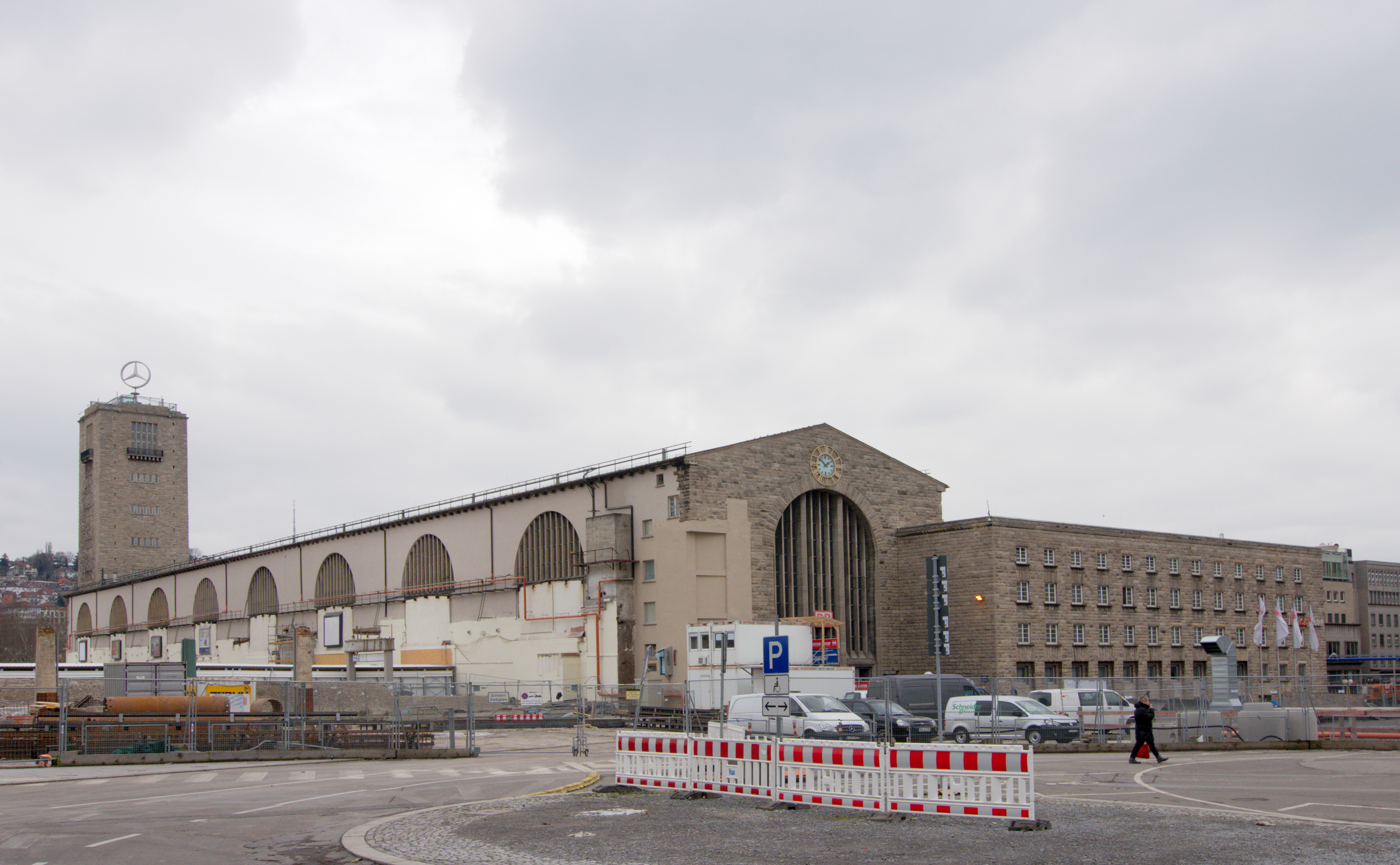
North and east side of the station building in February 2015, with the north exit in the centre of the picture

The north exit connects the terminal station hall with Friedrichstraße (the B 27); until 2012 it was the only barrier-free access to the station. Originally, the station forecourt, which had a pavilion in the centre, lay in front of the north exit; it was later used as a parking area and included an access to the passage under Arnulf-Klett-Platz. From the summer of 2012 to October 2013, the north exit was closed and the direct access to the Klett passage could not be used as the engineering building for the Stuttgart 21 project was being built there. The parking area, which had also not been available since summer 2012, has been partly usable since mid-2014. Barrier-free access was only possible via a detour during the construction of the engineering building: a new passage was created on the northwest side on the side of the platforms, about 100 metres (330 ft) from the former north exit, which currently serves as another barrier-free access to the station.

The arch above the north exit reflects the design of the remaining arches of the terminal station hall.

==== Small ticket hall ====
The small ticket hall is aligned with Lautenschlagerstraße and the Zeppelin building, also designed by Bonatz and Scholer. The small ticket hall was originally designed for access to suburban services on tracks 1 to 6 and also offered access to the adjacent Reichsbahn Hotel (now the Intercity Hotel). The small ticket hall is now occasionally used for events, otherwise it is empty.

==== Central exit ====
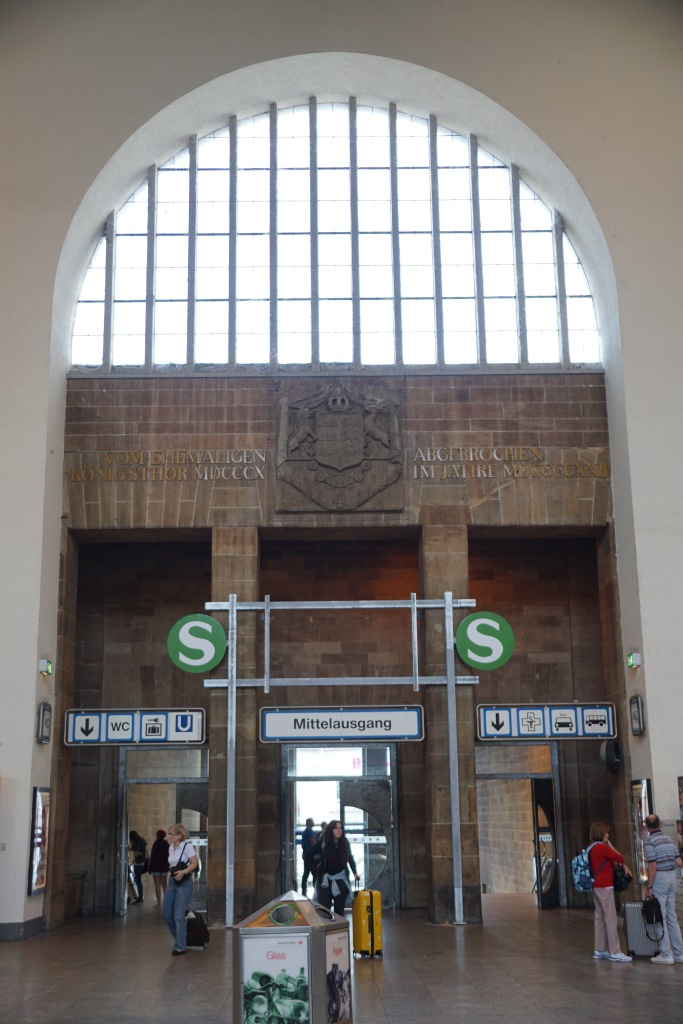
Central entrance to the platform hall with the coat of arms of the former Königstor (gate)

The central exit connects the terminal station hall with Arnulf-Klett-Platz. It is recessed behind the pillars of the arcades. In contrast to the clearly visible entrances, it is not visible from the outside. A Württemberg coat of arms was installed above the exit during the demolition of Königstor (king's gate) at the end of Königstraße in 1922. From the central exit there is an access to the Klett passage, but it is not possible to cross the Arnulf-Klett-Platz above ground. As part of the Stuttgart 21 project, the staircase to the above ground station hall is to be divided into three parts and its middle section is to be demolished to provide a passage for direct access to the distribution level behind.

==== Large ticket hall ====
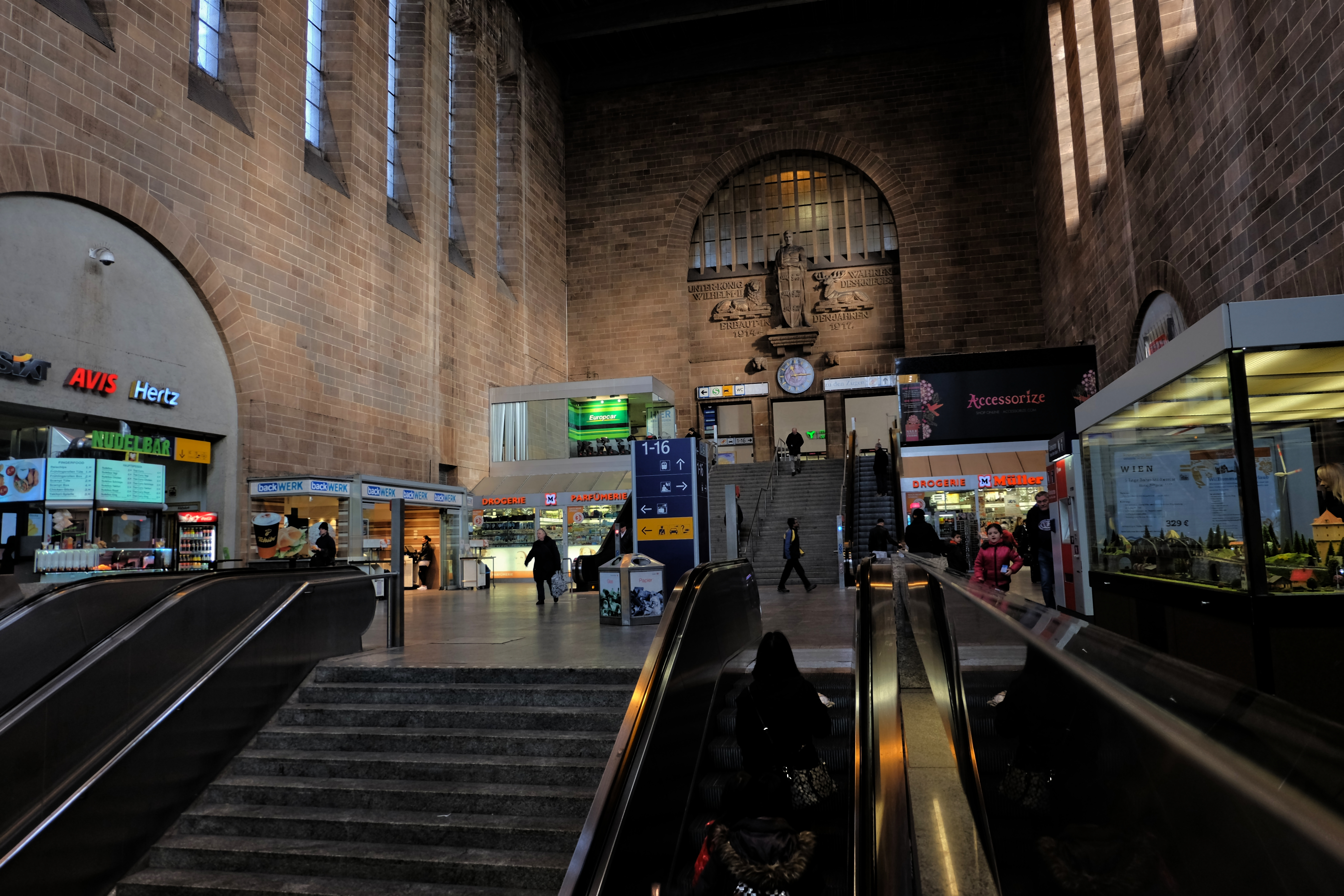
Interior view of the large ticket hall in 2015

The large ticket hall acts as an avant-corps in the façade of the entrance building, while also being an independent building. The arched opening to the city reinforces its monumentality and thus acts to give direction. It also reflects the motif of a city gate, which refers to the original location of the station in front of the city. The spatial effect arises not only from the size of the hall, but also from its functionality for rail travellers. The former Königstor, which had stood at the beginning of Unteren Königstraße since 1809 and actually fulfilled the function of a city gate, was perceived as a traffic obstacle after the construction of the station and was removed in 1922. Paul Bonatz rescued the shield of Königstor and had it mounted above the central entrance in the platform hall.

The large ticket hall was originally intended for long-distance traffic, which was handled on tracks 7 to 16. It receives the traffic coming from the Königstraße, but it is not aligned with the axis of the Königstraße. The interior of the hall has a vestibule character and the path to the station hall leads up a flight of steps. The original staircase was removed in the 1970s and replaced by a new staircase and two escalators. Around that time, the ground was broken to provide access to the Klett passage.

DB's travel centre and the AIRail check-in desks are now located in the large ticket hall and Königstraße is connected to the hall via the underground Klett passage.

In the course of the Stuttgart 21 project, the wall of the large ticket hall facing the station is to be breached in order to make a direct access to the planned distribution level behind it. The planned openings are to have the proportions of the arches above it. The staircase to the platform area would be removed, otherwise the width of the passage would not be sufficient for the expected flows of people and the spatial separation from the main hall would inevitably be obliterated by the installation of additional stairs. The main distribution system will be centered on the hub in the large ticket hall with the main pedestrian traffic flowing straight through.

=== North wing ===
The approximately 20-metre-wide (65 ft 7 in) north wing consisted of a cubic area for the railway postal service, which was used by Deutsche Post until July 2010, and adjoining office space that were last used by the Intercity Hotel and the Federal Police. With a length of 83 metres (272 ft), the north wing enclosed only part of the facilities on the platform, while the rest formed part of the freight yard, which was abandoned in 1995. The north wing was demolished in 2010 as part of the Stuttgart 21 project.

Kurt-Georg-Kiesinger-Platz lies between the north wing and Heilbronner Straße. The new LBBW building lines on this square, while the remaining main building of the former Reichsbahndirektion Stuttgart (Reichsbahn railway division headquarters) building is on the other side of the street.

=== Schlossgarten wing ===
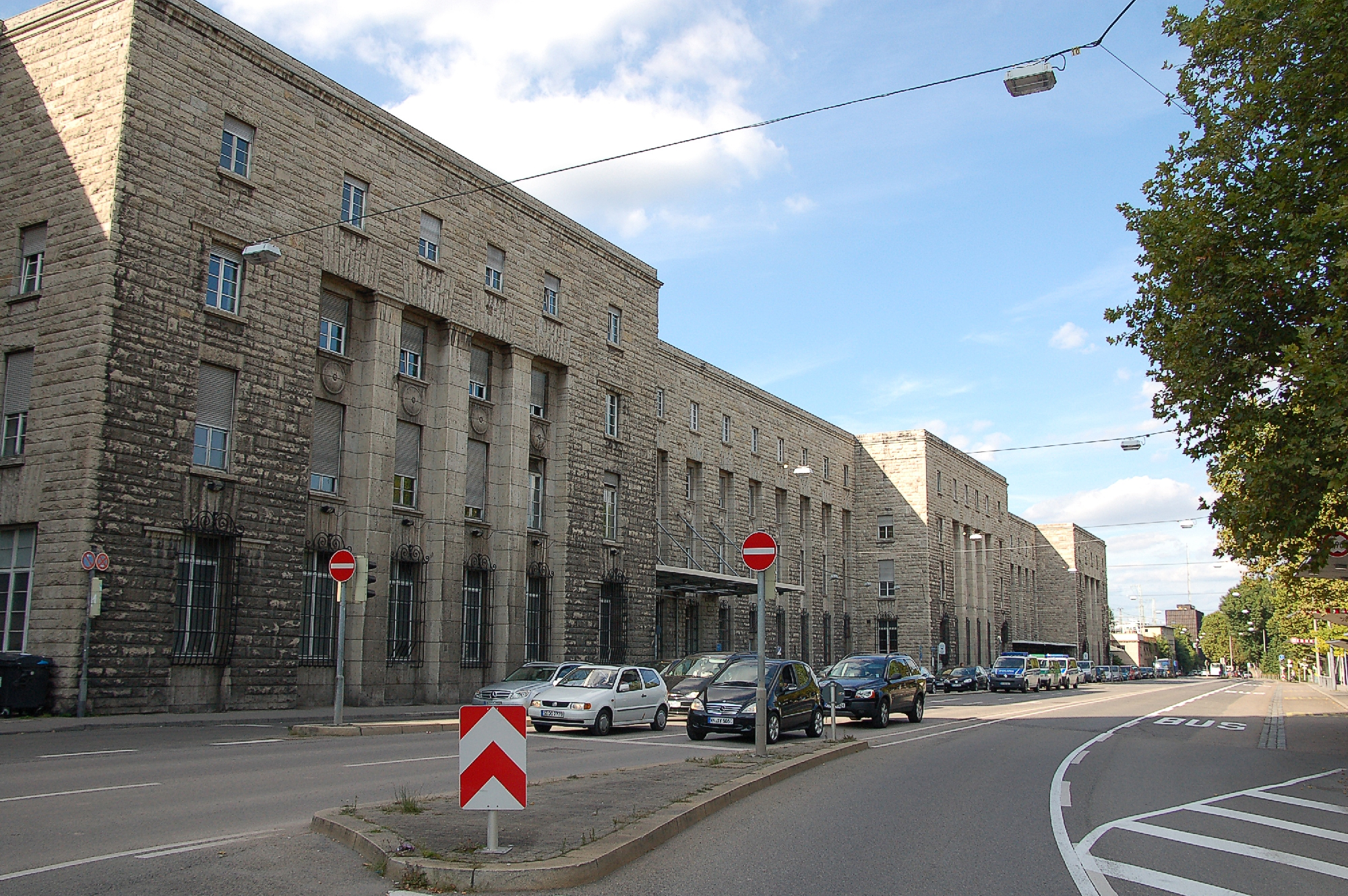
The Schlossgarten wing in September 2010

The Schlossgarten wing, also known as the South wing, continued the axis of the Königstraße and forms the side of the station on the Schlossgarten. The wing itself was 200 metres (656 ft 2 in) long and together with the large ticket hall and the station tower formed a 277-metre-long (908 ft 10 in) facade to the Schlossgarten. The façade was interrupted by the station tower and three 27-metre-wide (88 ft 7 in) avant-corps, which indicated the positions of the passenger subway and the former postal and express freight tunnels. The wing concealed the difference in height between the Mittlerer Schlossgarten (Central Palace Garden) and the railway facilities, while, during the steam era, it also protected the Schlossgarten from soot and noise from railway operations and functioned as a facade preserving the view from the park. The interior of the wing was used for rail services and express freight operations.

The Schlossgarten wing was demolished in the course of the Stuttgart 21 project from January 2012. According to the architect Christoph Ingenhoven, it was "technically absolutely impossible" to save the wing because the new underground concourse would cut it.

=== Klett passage ===
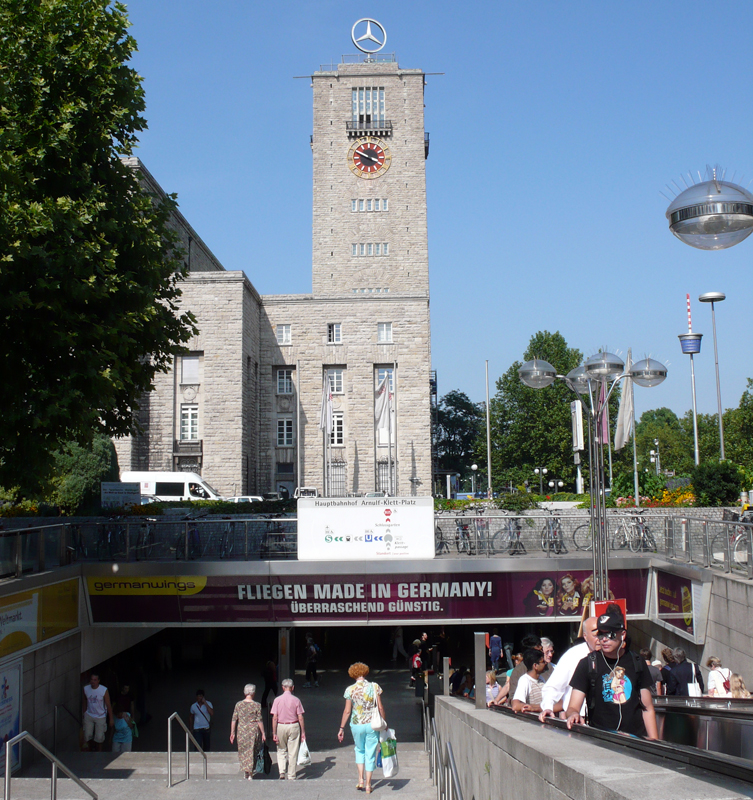
Access to the Klett passage from Königstraße

Seven Stadtbahn lines pass through the lower S-Bahn station under the station forecourt (Arnulf-Klett-Platz) in the second basement. The Klett passage on level −1 is the access and distribution level for the long-distance and regional services on level +1, to the S-Bahn services on level −3, to the Stadtbahn services on level −2 and to Arnulf-Klett-Platz on level 0 and the city centre. In it is also a large shopping arcade.

Another part of the first basement level is used for an underground car park with 120 parking spaces, which also serves as a fallout shelter with 4,500 seats. In a disaster or military emergency, part of the underground parking lot would be provided with beds (separated by pressure doors); the technical rooms, kitchen, sanitary installations, water and air conditioning for the bunker are located on the second basement level.

=== Other ===
The front of the building features a quote by Georg Wilhelm Friedrich Hegel in the form of a lit inscription—the quote reads … daß diese Furcht zu irren schon der Irrtum selbst ist.—loosely translated as "… that this fear of making a mistake is a mistake itself." The inscription is a work by the artist Joseph Kosuth from the early 1990s.

In the main hall, near the south exit, there is a DB Lounge for first-class passengers, bahn.comfort (a customer loyalty program) customers and first class and "Senator" AIRail passengers.

Schillerstraße (Arnulf-Klett-Platz) in front of the station is used by up to 50,000 vehicles a day.

== Operations ==
In 1994, Stuttgart Hauptbahnhof was the source of 49,400 passengers in regional traffic (excluding the S-Bahn) and 39,000 in long-distance traffic (ICE, IC, IR) each day. With about 210,000 passengers per day, the station was the biggest in Baden-Wuerttemberg in 2005. More than 12,000 people transferred daily between Stadtbahn and regional services in 2014.

According to DB data 164 long-distance trains, 426 regional trains (as of 2009) and 650 S-Bahn trains (as of 2005) serve the station daily.

=== Long-distance connections ===
In the 2026 timetable, the following long-distance services stopped at the station:

Connection	Route		Frequency
ICE 6	Stuttgart – Nuremberg – Berlin Südkreuz – Berlin – Berlin Gesundbrunnen		Once a day
ICE 11	Berlin Gesundbrunnen – Berlin – Leipzig – Erfurt – Frankfurt –	Mannheim – Stuttgart – Ulm – Augsburg – Munich	Every 2 hours
ICE 11	Wiesbaden → Mainz →	Mannheim – Stuttgart – Ulm – Augsburg – Munich	1 train
ICE 13	Stuttgart – Heidelberg – Darmstadt – Frankfurt South – Kassel – Braunschweig – Wolfsburg – Berlin – Berlin Ostbahnhof		1 train pair
ICE 22	(Kiel –) Hamburg – Hannover – Frankfurt – Mannheim – Stuttgart		Every 2 hours
ICE 42	Dortmund – Essen – Duisburg – Düsseldorf – Cologne – Frankfurt Airport –– Mannheim – Stuttgart – Ulm – Augsburg – Munich		Every 2 hours
ICE 45	Cologne – Wiesbaden – Mainz – Mannheim – Heidelberg – Stuttgart		1 train pair
ICE 47	Dortmund – Essen – Duisburg – Cologne – Frankfurt Airport – Mannheim – Stuttgart – Ulm – Augsburg – Munich-Pasing – Munich		Some trains
ICE 55; IC 55	Dresden – Leipzig – Halle – Magdeburg – Braunschweig – Hanover – Bielefeld – Dortmund – Hagen – Wuppertal – Solingen – Cologne – Bonn – Koblenz – Bingen – Mainz – Mannheim – Heidelberg – Vaihingen – Stuttgart		Every 2 hours
ICE 55; IC 55	Dortmund – Essen – Düsseldorf – Cologne – Bonn – Koblenz – Mainz – Mannheim – Heidelberg – Vaihingen – Stuttgart – Ulm – Oberstdorf		1 train pair
ICE 60	(Basel Bad – Freiburg – Offenburg – Baden-Baden –) Karlsruhe – Bruchsal –	Stuttgart – Ulm – Augsburg – Munich-Pasing – Munich	Every 2 hours
ICE 60	Saarbrücken – Homburg – Kaiserslautern – Neustadt –	Stuttgart – Ulm – Augsburg – Munich-Pasing – Munich	1 train pair
IC 61	Karlsruhe – Pforzheim – Stuttgart – Aalen – Nuremberg – Bamberg – Lichtenfels – Kronach – Saalfeld – Jena-Göschwitz – Jena Paradies – Naumburg – Weißenfels – Leipzig		Every 2 hours (2 train pairs between Nuremberg and Leipzig)
ICE 62	Frankfurt – Darmstadt – Heidelberg –	Stuttgart – Ulm – Augsburg – Munich – Rosenheim – Salzburg – Villach – Klagenfurt – Graz	2 train pairs
ICE 62	Münster – Essen – Düsseldorf – Köln Messe/Deutz – Frankfurt Airport – Mannheim –	Stuttgart – Ulm – Augsburg – Munich – Rosenheim – Salzburg – Villach – Klagenfurt – Graz	1 train pair
ICE 62	Dortmund – Bochum – Essen – Duisburg – Düsseldorf – Köln Messe/Deutz – Frankfurt Airport – Mannheim – Heidelberg – Stuttgart – Ulm – Friedrichshafen Stadt – Lindau-Reutin – Bregenz – St. Anton – Innsbruck		1 train pair
ICE/TGV 83	Paris Est – Strasbourg – Karlsruhe – Stuttgart (– Ulm – Augsburg – Munich)		5 train pairs
IC 87	(Frankfurt – Heidelberg) – Stuttgart – Böblingen – Horb – Rottweil – Tuttlingen – Singen	– Konstanz	Hourly
IC 87	(Frankfurt – Heidelberg) – Stuttgart – Böblingen – Horb – Rottweil – Tuttlingen – Singen	(– Schaffhausen – Zurich)	Hourly
IC 87	Stuttgart – München – Salzburg – Wien		only IC 460/461
ICE/RJX 90	Frankfurt – Mannheim – Stuttgart – Ulm – Munich – Salzburg – Vienna (– Budapest)		2 train pairs on weekends
FLX 10	Berlin Hbf – Berlin Südkreuz – Halle (Saale) – Erfurt – Gotha – Eisenach – Fulda – Frankfurt South – Darmstadt – Weinheim – Heidelberg – Stuttgart		1–2 train pairs

=== Regional connections ===
In the 2026 timetable, the following regional services stopped at the station:

Line	Route		Frequency
RE 1	Karlsruhe – Pforzheim – Mühlacker – Vaihingen – Stuttgart (– Schorndorf – Schwäbisch Gmünd – Aalen)		Hourly, every two hours Stuttgart-Aalen
RE 4	Stuttgart Hbf – Böblingen – Herrenberg – Horb – Rottweil – Tuttlingen – Singen (Hohentwiel) (– Konstanz)		3 train pairs (Sun)
IC 87	Stuttgart Hbf – Böblingen – Herrenberg – Horb – Rottweil – Tuttlingen – Singen (Hohentwiel) (– Konstanz)		Hourly (Stuttgart – Singen) 2 train pairs (Singen – Konstanz; Mon–Fri); 1 train pair (Singen – Konstanz; Sat, Sun)
RE 5	Stuttgart – Esslingen – Plochingen – Göppingen – Geislingen – Ulm – Biberach – Friedrichshafen Stadt (– Lindau-Reutin)		Hourly
RE 6	Stuttgart Hbf – Metzingen (Württ) – Reutlingen Hbf – Tübingen Hbf		Every two hours
RE 6a	Stuttgart Hbf – Reutlingen Hbf – Tübingen Hbf (train split)	– Hechingen – Balingen (Württ.) – Albstadt-Ebingen – Sigmaringen – Herbertingen – Aulendorf	Every two hours
RE 6b	Stuttgart Hbf – Reutlingen Hbf – Tübingen Hbf (train split)	Rottenburg	Every two hours
RE 8	Stuttgart – Ludwigsburg – Bietigheim – Heilbronn – Bad Friedrichshall – Osterburken – Lauda – Würzburg		Hourly
RE 14a	Stuttgart Hbf – Böblingen – Herrenberg – Eutingen im Gäu (train split)	– Horb – Rottweil	Every two hours
RE 14b	Stuttgart Hbf – Böblingen – Herrenberg – Eutingen im Gäu (train split)	– Hochdorf (b. Horb) – Freudenstadt	Every two hours
RE 17b	Stuttgart – Ludwigsburg – Bietigheim – Vaihingen – Mühlacker – Bretten – Bruchsal – Heidelberg		Every two hours
RE 90	Stuttgart – Waiblingen – Backnang – Gaildorf West – Schwäbisch Hall-Hessental – Crailsheim – Ansbach – Nuremberg		Every two hours
MEX 13	Stuttgart – Waiblingen – Schorndorf – Schwäbisch Gmünd – Aalen – Ellwangen – Crailsheim		Half-hourly (hourly to Ellwangen, every 2 hours to Crailsheim)
MEX 16	Stuttgart – Esslingen – Plochingen – Göppingen – Geislingen – Ulm		Hourly (half-hourly to Geislingen, hourly to Ulm) (+ additional trains in the peak)
MEX 17a	Stuttgart – Bietigheim-Bissingen – Vaihingen (Enz) – Mühlacker – Pforzheim Hbf (– Bad Wildbad/Wilferdingen-Singen – Karlsruhe)		Half-hourly (Bietigheim-Bissingen – Pforzheim), hourly (Stuttgart – Bietigheim-Bissingen), 5 train pairs (Pforzheim – Karlsruhe), 4 train pairs (Pforzheim – Bad Wildbad)
MEX 17c	Stuttgart – Ludwigsburg – Bietigheim – Vaihingen – Mühlacker – Bretten – Bruchsal		Hourly
MEX 18	Tübingen – Reutlingen – Metzingen – Nürtingen – Plochingen – Esslingen (Neckar) – Stuttgart – Ludwigsburg – Bietigheim – Heilbronn – Bad Friedrichshall – Osterburken		Hourly
MEX 19	Stuttgart – Waiblingen – Backnang – Gaildorf West – Schwäbisch Hall-Hessental (– Crailsheim)		Hourly (not in the evening, some trains continue to Crailsheim)

In most cases, these connection start or end in Stuttgart. This means that for most connections that go through Stuttgart Hauptbahnhof, a change of trains is necessary. As part of the Stuttgart 21 project, with Stuttgart Hbf becoming a through-station, most regional connections would no longer require the change of trains.

Among the seven local regional lines starting in Stuttgart, the line to Tübingen, with an average of 32,100 passengers during the week, was the most used in 2014.

In addition, the Schienenverkehrsgesellschaft mbH (SVG) operates Freizeitexpress (FEX) services on Saturday/Sunday and during holidays.

Line	Route	Frequency	Operator
FEXBodensee II	Stuttgart – Böblingen – Horb – Tuttlingen – Engen – Singen – Radolfzell – Konstanz	limited service	SVG Stuttgart
FEXSüdbahn	Stuttgart – Plochingen – Ulm – Aulendorf – Ravensburg – Friedrichshafen Stadt – Überlingen Therme – Radolfzell – Singen	limited service	SVG Stuttgart

=== S-Bahn connections ===
Line No.	Route
S 1	Kirchheim unter Teck – Plochingen – Esslingen – Neckarpark – Bad Cannstatt – Hauptbahnhof – Schwabstraße – Vaihingen – Rohr – Böblingen – Herrenberg (additional trains on work days between Esslingen and Schwabstraße or Böblingen.)
S 11	Neckarpark – Bad Cannstatt – Hauptbahnhof (tief) – Schwabstraße – Vaihingen – Rohr – Böblingen – Herrenberg
S 2	Schorndorf – Weinstadt – Waiblingen – Bad Cannstatt – Hauptbahnhof – Schwabstraße – Vaihingen – Rohr – Flughafen/Messe – Filderstadt (additional trains on work days between Schorndorf and Vaihingen.)
S 3	Backnang – Winnenden – Waiblingen – Bad Cannstatt – Hauptbahnhof – Vaihingen – Rohr – Flughafen/Messe (due to the opening of the new exhibition center, trains run to the airport on weekends; late evening traffic only goes to Vaihingen; additional trains on work days between Backnang and Vaihingen).
S 4	Backnang – Marbach – Ludwigsburg – Zuffenhausen – Hauptbahnhof – Schwabstraße
S 5	Schwabstraße – Hauptbahnhof – Zuffenhausen – Ludwigsburg – Bietigheim
S 6	Schwabstraße – Hauptbahnhof – Zuffenhausen – Leonberg – Weil der Stadt
S 60	Schwabstraße – Hauptbahnhof – Zuffenhausen – Leonberg – Renningen – Magstadt – Maichingen – Sindelfingen – Böblingen

The abbreviation for the Hauptbahnhof S-Bahn station underground is TST.

The station is to be modernised between the end of 2019 and the end of 2020 at a cost of €9 million.

=== Freight traffic ===
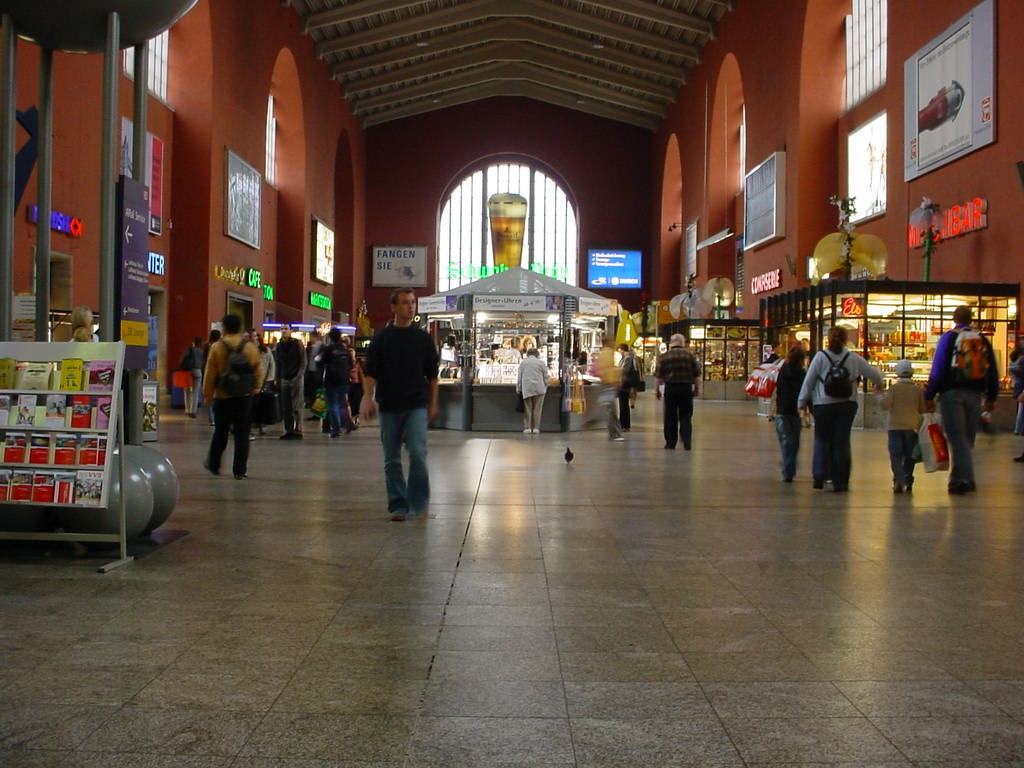
The station from the inside in 2004

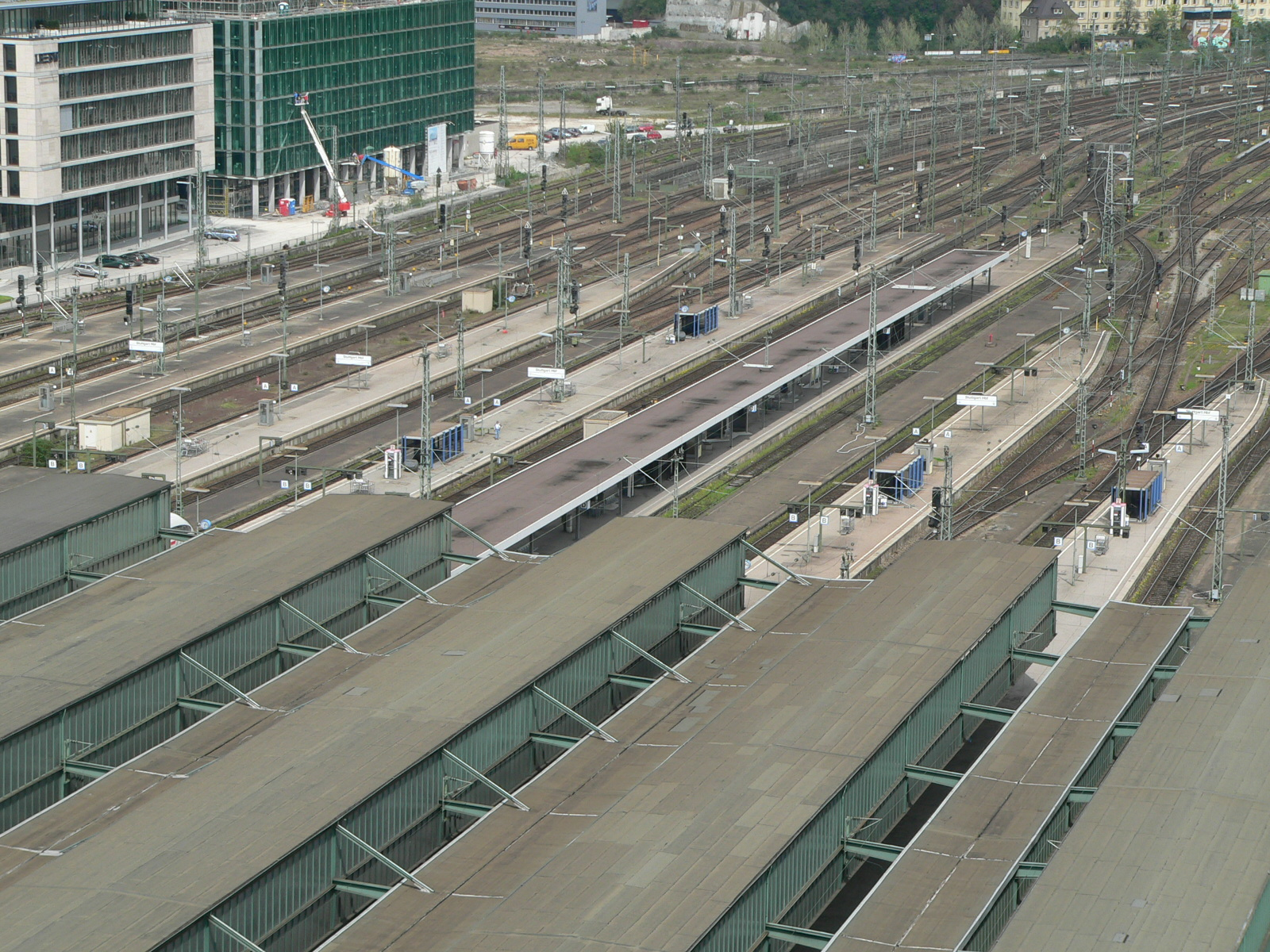
A view of the tracks from the tower in 2005

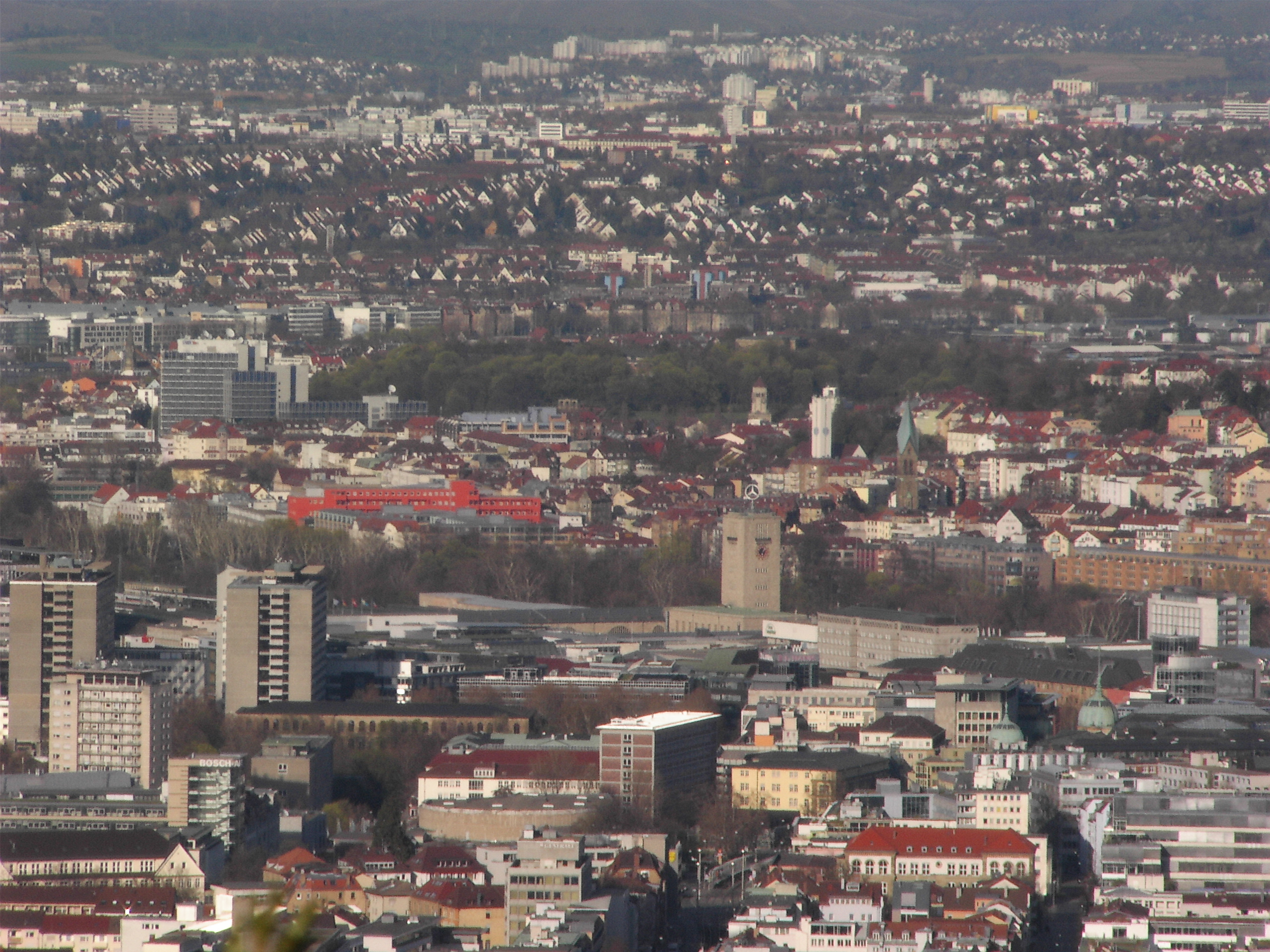
The station as viewed from the west (bottom center)

In addition to the passenger station, there used to be a closed and already demolished freight station and small shunting station, which featured a marshaling hump with rail brakes. The freight yard was used until the 1980s. The goods traffic was later completely shifted to the Kornwestheim marshalling yard; the decision to move was made independently of the Stuttgart 21 project.

=== Stadtbahn ===
Under the Arnulf-Klett-Platz (the station forecourt), the largest and most important node of the Stadtbahn features these routes:

Line No.	Route
U1	Heslach Vogelrain – Hauptbahnhof – Bad Cannstatt-Wilhelmsplatz – Fellbach Lutherkirche
U5	Killesberg – Hauptbahnhof – Degerloch – Möhringen – Leinfelden Neuer Markt
U6	Gerlingen – Weilimdorf – Feuerbach – Hauptbahnhof – Degerloch – Möhringen – Flughafen/Messe
U7	Mönchfeld – Zuffenhausen – Hauptbahnhof – Ruhbank/Fernsehturm – Heumaden – Ostfildern-Nellingen
U9	Botnang – Vogelsang – Hauptbahnhof – – Hedelfingen
U12	Remseck – Halschlag – Budapester Platz – Hauptbahnhof – Degerloch – Möhringen – Dürrlewang
U15	Stammheim – Zuffenhausen – Pragsattel – Hauptbahnhof – Eugensplatz – Ruhbank/Fernsehturm (– Heumaden)

In addition, in case of events at the NeckarPark and Cannstatter Wasen

Line No.	Route
U11	Hauptbahnhof – Charlottenplatz-Mineralbäder – Cannstatter Wasen – NeckarPark (Stadion)

== Noteworthy ==
The Hauptbahnhof has been assigned the IATA code ZWS, because the station is used by Lufthansa in the AIRail concept. Passengers may travel in ICE trains, which are also assigned flight numbers, to Frankfurt Airport in Frankfurt am Main, instead of using a short-distance flight. For this reason, Lufthansa used to have a check-in counter near the entrance from the Arnulf-Klett-Platz. Passengers were able to both check and receive their baggage at this counter until 2007.

=== District of the city centre ===
Hauptbahnhof has also been the name of one of ten sub-districts of the district of Stuttgart-Mitte (central Stuttgart) since 2007. This district has only a few residential buildings, so its population was 287 in 2014. Previously it was called Klettplatz.

== Stuttgart 21 ==
As part of the Stuttgart 21 project, the two wings were demolished. There has been widespread resentment of the entire project to place the main lines underground, leading to significant protests, in particular in response to the felling of some 260 huge and old trees. More than 18,000 people have registered as Parkschützer (park guardians); about a thousand vowed to stay in the path of demolition crews while chaining themselves to the trees. The colourful resistance led to nearly daily demonstrations and became a major factor in the 2011 state elections.

The Stuttgart architect and Bonatz expert Matthias Roser initiated an international call for the preservation of the Hauptbahnhof, including the wings, and over 400 architects, building historians, monument conservators, art historians, and city planners, such as the Pritzker Architecture Prize recipients Richard Meier and David Chipperfield, joined this effort. This group viewed the Bonatz-designed building as one of the most significant railway station structures of the 20th century in Germany and Europe as a whole, and were opposed to any structural changes.

On 27 November 2011, a referendum on the project "Stuttgart 21" resulted in 58.8% voted in favour of the project, while 41.2% voted against it.

In order to provide necessary space for the new station's construction—next to the main building, where the ends of the platforms used to be—the platforms had to be moved away from the building, and the track layout underwent significant changes. In the process, three trains derailed on different occasions in 2012.

=== Overview ===
Outline map of the Stuttgart 21 project

Stuttgart 21 is a transport and urban development project under construction for the complete reorganisation of the Stuttgart railway junction. The existing terminus is to be rotated by about 90° and converted into a through station with eight tracks. For this purpose, the approach track are being laid in tunnels from all directions. The aim is to increase the capacity of the station, to shorten transfer routes and to reduce maintenance costs. During the debate surrounding the project, critics proposed several alternative plans, including the extensive refurbishment and the progressive redevelopment of the existing station under the concept of Kopfbahnhof 21 (terminus 21).

In the feasibility study submitted in 1995, the cost of the underground station (today's planning approval section 1.1, excluding the access tracks required by its new location) was estimated at DM 930 million (€476 million). In 2009, the costs were estimated at €400 million. According to the overall planner Ingenhoven, the calculated costs are less than ten percent above the original cost estimate (as of 2013). Deutsche Bahn AG estimates that the expenditure of approximately €110 million will be required for the continued "third-party use" of the Bonatz building, which is not part of the Stuttgart 21 project.

=== Planned measures ===
The station is covered by the planning approval for section 1.1 of the Stuttgart 21 project. The application for planning approval of the first section of Stuttgart 21 was submitted on 31 October 2001. The five-day hearing of objections closed on 11 April 2003 after more than 50 hours of debate. It was considered the largest and most complicated hearing in the history of the Stuttgart regional council. Planning approval was granted by the Federal Railway Authority (Eisenbahn-Bundesamt) on 28 January 2005 and became final in June 2006. The Bund für Umwelt und Naturschutz Deutschland (BUND) lodged a class action against the approval. By mid-2015 there had been fourteen amendments to the plan, including fundamental changes such as the doubling of the groundwater extraction rate (seventh amendment of the plan), the installation of additional escape stairs (sixth amendment) and the shortening of the channel carrying the Nesenbach (stream) and the adoption of an open design for it (14th amendment).

In July 2015, a further amendment to the plan was announced, which means that the smoke extraction building in Sängerstraße will remain unchanged externally, but will receive a significantly more efficient ventilation system.

==== Pedestrian network ====
The four 420-metre (1,380 ft)-long island platforms will have a width of 10 metres (33 ft) and will be 1.60 metres (5 ft 3 in) wider than the platforms of the current terminus.

The comfort of passenger movements resulting from the planned entrances, footbridges, stairs, lifts and platforms was examined in a pedestrian flow analysis. In the peak hour, the traffic quality is mainly in the range of quality level C ("limited speed selection") and partly in the range of quality level D ("clearly limited speed choice"), outside the peak hour, quality levels A and B (free or almost free flow of traffic) is achieved.

==== Track layout ====
The station is to have eight platform tracks, which are to be connected at both ends of the station to four access tracks:

- in the northwest to two tracks each towards Feuerbach and Bad Cannstatt.
- in the southeast to two tracks each towards Flughafen/Messe/Ulm and Wangen/Obertürkheim/Untertürkheim.

Schematic track plan of the underground station (with eight tracks)

The two ends of the station are planned to be grade separated with flying junctions. From each of the four directions of approach, trains will be able to reach five of the eight platform tracks. The two middle platform tracks will be able to be used by trains from all four directions. The planned entry speed on the approach tracks is 60 km/h (37 mph) (outer tracks), 80 km/h (50 mph) and 100 km/h (62 mph) (island platform 4 and 5). Blocked paths would also be avoided by a flexible choice of approaches from the existing lines. The number of sets of points (each outside the operations of the station) will decrease compared to the current terminus from 225 to 48.

Already in the course of the "preliminary project" initiated in early 1995, the track plan of the planned underground station had been optimised for directional operation to such an extent that all platforms operating in each direction could be reached from all incoming tracks. The plan for the northern end of the station had been changed compared to the plan submitted to the regional planning procedure after an anhydrite deposit was found in the geotechnical investigation. The nearest entrance and exit turnouts were shifted by about 150 metres (490 ft) towards the station. The transition from two twin-track tunnels to four single-track tunnels was also preferred.

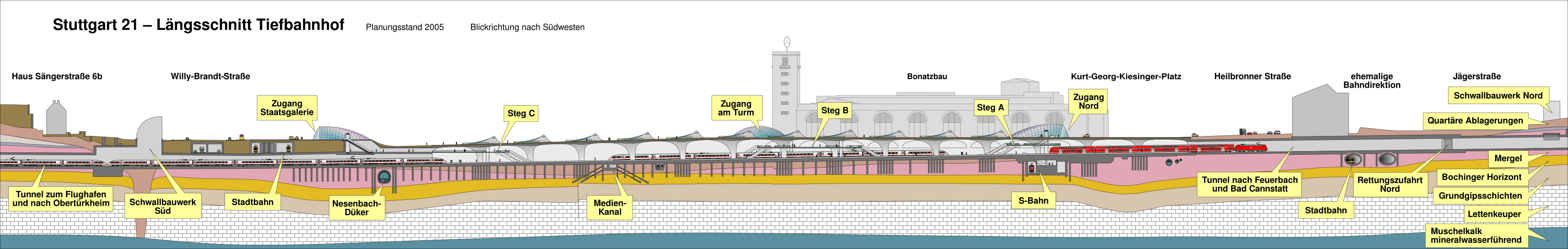
Longitudinal section of the underground station

The planned station hall measures 447 metres (1,467 ft) in length and 80.58 metres (264 ft 4 in) in width, at a height of 10 to 12 metres (33 to 39 ft). The building will be founded on a 1.60-to-2.50-metre (5 ft 3 in to 8 ft 2 in) thick plate and anchored by 3,700 piles. The base of the building will lie between 6 and 8 metres (20 and 26 ft) below the water table. Between the lowest point of the foundations and the groundwater, according to the promoter, there would be a water-impermeable layer more than 35 metres (115 ft) thick. The new station can only be built as cut and cover to avoid disturbances to the level of the groundwater.

The planning approval section begins in the northwest at line-km -0.442. At this point, in the area of Jägerstraße 24, the connecting tunnels, which have been constructed using a mining method, open out into the station. The gradient initially drops from an altitude of 241 metres (at the railhead; ground altitude: 258 metres) to the south for 404 metres at 1.31 percent and then continues for another 459 metres at a gradient of 1.51 percent, before an inflection point (km +0.345, 230 metres above sea level at the railhead, 12 metres below ground level) at the southern end of the station from which the gradient rises to the end of the section at 0.41 percent. The section limit is at line-kilometre +0.432, in the Willy-Brandt-Platz area, at the junction with the connecting tunnels to be excavated by mining methods.

According to the Deutsche Bahn information, a track gradient of up to 1.51 percent is required in the platform area due to several fixed points (Stadtbahn lines and groundwater streams), which is above the ruling limit for station tracks of 0.25 percent. Safe operations are still guaranteed by a bank in the middle of the platforms of 1.0 percent. In March 2016, it was announced that the proof of sufficient security required for operations had not yet been provided. This also makes it unclear what operational restrictions will be required for the increased gradient. Critics see significant risks from trains moving accidentally on this gradient.

==== Station building ====
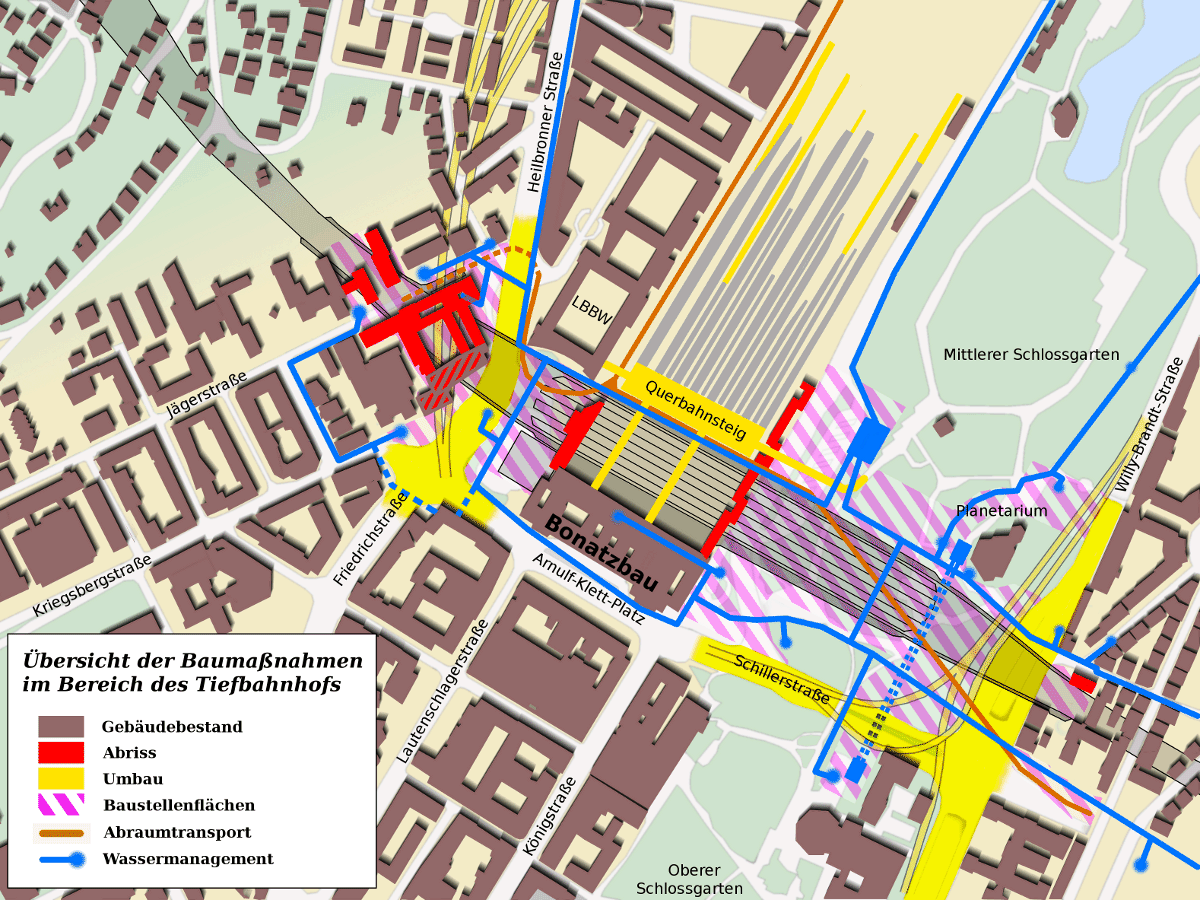
Planned construction measures in the station area

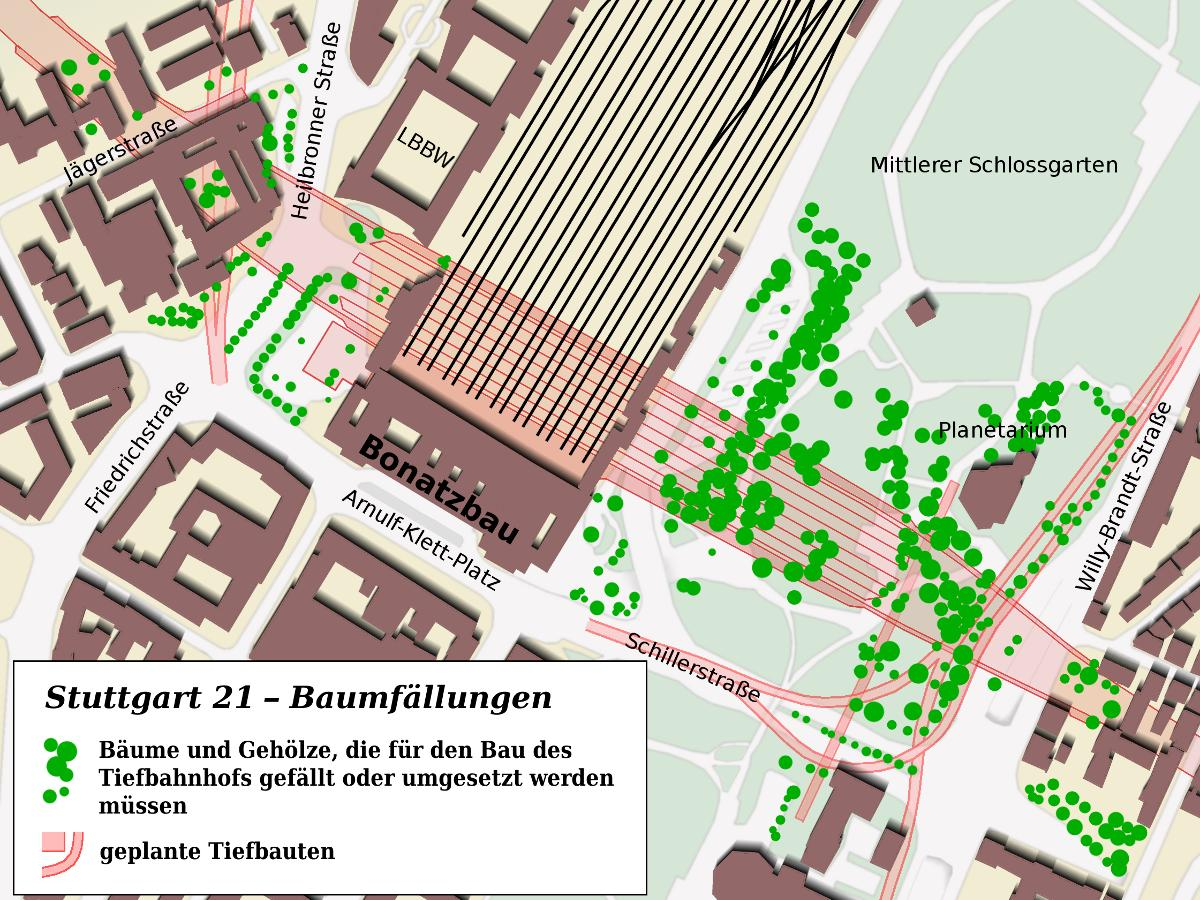
Around 280 trees are to be felled or moved in the station area.

21 different changes will be made on the remaining part of the former station building, the so-called Bonatz-Bau (Bonatz building), in parallel with the Stuttgart 21 project. The function of the building will be maintained. The building's façades will be preserved using a new structural frame and modern building technology. Construction on the Bonatz building is scheduled to begin in 2018 and be completed 2021.

A hotel, restaurant and conference complex with 150 hotel rooms will be built in the above-ground part of the building on four levels. Levels +3 and +4 will be rebuilt, but set back from Schillerstraße so that they do not affect the overall impression of the building from that street.

Straßburger Platz ("Strasbourg Square") is to be created on the roof of the through station at the current level of the railway tracks and the current platform hall (the so-called "level +1"). This area, delimited to the south by the Bonatz building and to the north by a new station building, will connect Kurt-Georg-Kiesinger-Platz with the Schlossgarten. Daylight will reach the platforms through 27 4.30 metre-high "high-light eyes" (Lichtaugen).

A distribution level with access from the station tower, Königsstraße, Königsallee (Cannstatter Straße) and the new city district is to be created below Straßburger Platz on level 0. The four platforms are to be arranged with eight platform tracks on the lower level ("level −1"). Access to the lower-lying, double-track S-Bahn station is planned below the new platform tracks. A new parking garage is to be built below the northern part of the station building and to the north of it, but underground. Level −2 is to act as the S-Bahn level, including giving access to it.

The entrance to the station building is to be built next to the existing entrances and will run through four 23 metres-wide and up to 10 metres-high glass-mesh shells. In total, more than 35 escalators and 15 so-called "panoramic" lifts are planned.

The platforms are to be accessed via three distribution points (level 0) near two ticket halls and the Planetarium/Staatsgalerie. Each platform is to be accessed by three lifts, five escalators and five sets of stairs. A new shortcut to the Staatsgalerie Stadtbahn stop is to be built at the eastern end.

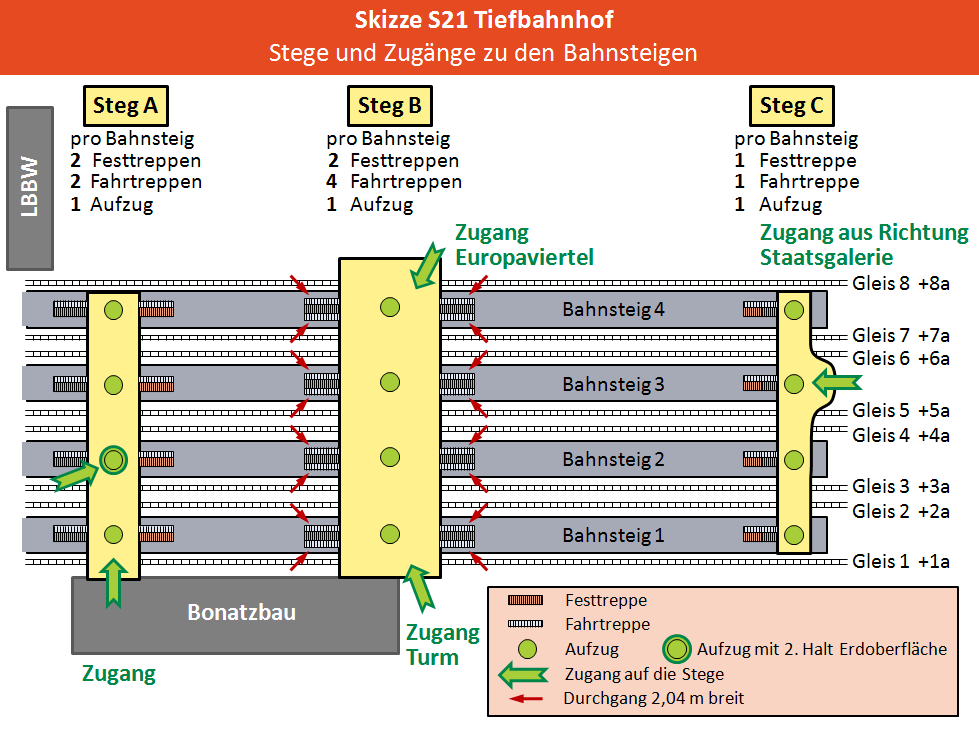
Schematic overview of platform access with bottlenecks

The main access to the platform level is to be provided by the middle pier (pier B), which is to be accessed via the large ticket hall and the new access to the station tower in the south and the Europaviertel ("European quarter", a new commercial development) in the north. Each of the four platforms is accessed from this ramp via a lift and two escalators and sets of stairs on each side. Critics have noted that the passage is just 2.04 metres wide between the outer edge of the stairs and the platform edge at the point.

The western pier (pier A) is to be reached mainly via the new access at Kurt-Georg-Kiesinger-Platz and the small ticket hall. From this pier, each platform is accessed via a lift and an escalator and a set of stairs on each side. The passage is 2.85 metres wide at its narrowest point.

The eastern pier (pier C) is approached via the entrance from the Staatsgalerie, which can be reached by a pedestrian tunnel. An elevator as well as two escalators and two sets of stairs are planned at the exit to the Staatsgalerie. It has no access to piers A and B and thus no access to the Bonatz building. From the distribution level, each platform is connected by a lift and an escalator and a set of stairs to the west. The passage width between the stairs and the platform edge is 2.86 metres.

After the commissioning of Stuttgart 21, an additional station building will be built on the opposite side of the new through station, which will serve as a station access from the north and will also accommodate operating rooms. Alteration of the Stadtbahn line under Heilbronner Straße was due from mid-2011 to mid-2014 and of the Staatsgalerie Stadtbahn station from February 2013. Among the numerous other construction measures is the relocation of the Nesenbach (construction was originally planned for late 2011 to mid-2014, but started in June 2015) and the West main drains.

===== Light and air conditioning =====
The rail infrastructure is designed as a zero-energy building: the air conditioning will be operated exclusively using geothermal energy, assisted by the cooling effect of incoming trains. The temperature in the platform area should also not fall below ten degrees without artificial heating (at an external temperature of −20 degrees Celsius) or exceed 29 degrees. The "high-light eyes" will also be able to be opened for ventilation and smoke extraction. Experiments have shown that the station concourse will be lit naturally by the high-light eyes for up to 14 hours daily and will be able to cope during this period without artificial light. Floor lights at the edge of the platform will mark the edge of the platform next to the track bed. On average, 5 percent of daylight would enter the interior, but under the high-light eyes, this proportion would rise to 10 to 15 percent.

=== History ===
==== Planning ====
On the basis of "operational considerations", the station considered for the feasibility study at the beginning of 1995 provided for eight platforms with four 10-metre-wide and 420-metre-long island platforms. The tracks, which would be dedicated to operations in a particular direction, would have had connecting passages in the tunnels running from the platforms. To the northwest, two twin-track connecting tunnels were to run in parallel and after a sharp curve to the northeast would divide south of Mittnachtstrasse station (in the Wolframstraße area) into a branch towards Feuerbach and a branch towards Bad Cannstatt. To the southeast, four single-track tunnels were to be built directly to the turnout halls (two to Obertürkheim and Untertürkheim and two to the Airport). Under the design presented as an example, the Bonatz Building would have been preserved and an additional entrance would have been created in the side wing on Cannstatter Straße. The railway layout would be built at a gradient of up to 1.1 percent. According to the feasibility study, the costs of the section including the station and the valley crossing, would amount to DM 928 million (DM 807 million plus 15 percent for planning costs, 1993 prices), which on an inflation-adjusted basis would have amounted to €749 million.

The Synergiekonzept Stuttgart 21 ("synergy concept") presented at the end of 1995 provided for an eight-track through station with three island and two outer platforms. Traffic forecasts expected an increase to 70,400 long-distance and 53,100 regional passengers each day. The share of through traffic in total traffic in 2010 was projected to be around 50 percent for long-distance and just under 20 percent for regional services (54,000 and 13,000 passengers each day). The plan was later modified so that four island platforms are now planned on the concourse.

A regional planning process (Raumordnungsverfahren) was carried out for the Stuttgart 21 project in 1996 and 1997. The through station solution favoured by Deutsche Bahn was examined as a proposed route with different suboptions. These included options with different platform positions, numbers of track and possibilities for further development.

Other options, which deviated from the basic concept of a pure through station at the location of the existing terminus station, were mentioned in the spatial planning process, but were not examined to the same depth: the "lean" option provided for a continuation of the terminal station, while the "Kombi" option provided for the construction of a through station for long-distance traffic, but the terminal station would also be maintained. In addition, a Hauptbahnhof am Rosenstein (main station on Rosenstein ridge) option was considered, which would have involved abandonment of the current station. In addition, station locations in Bad Cannstatt and Untertürkheim were considered.

On 28 February 1997, a Europe-wide architectural competition for the redesign of the station was announced. The new station should be a "visible sign of pioneering mobility and a landmark for Stuttgart and its region".

In a two-stage process, 19 participants out of 118 applicants who had initially submitted a concept were selected for a second round. A jury chaired by Klaus Humpert selected four equal winners in July 1997. The four award-winning designs and six other designs were displayed in Stuttgart Hauptbahnhof from 11 August to 14 September 1997. All four designs provided a station rotated by 90 degrees with daylight illumination. On 4 November 1997, the design of the office of Ingenhoven, Overdiek, Kahlen and Partner was finally chosen from the 126 submissions.

Ingenhoven's concept at that time was to build the station underground at a cost of DM 350 million (equivalent to about €255 million) and to illuminate it with daylight from 27 light shafts, each 15 metres wide. The support structure of the station concourse was developed by Frei Otto. The draft had been revised several times already in the competition. Four designs were available in the final round.

In 2005, the design received the MIPIM Future Project Award from the magazine Architectural Review as well as a Silver Award at the regional Holcim Awards and a Golden Award in the global competition the following year. In 2007, the design was awarded one of 58 International Architecture Awards from the Chicago Athenaeum.

By 2006, the €2.8 billion estimated total cost of Stuttgart 21 included almost €800 million for the Hauptbahnhof. The architect, Christoph Ingenhoven, received €36 million.

A modified building design was presented at the end of August 2010. Among other things, the size of the four entrances was reduced and routing and acoustics were revised.

Heiner Geißler, who was entrusted with the task of conciliating views in relation to the Stuttgart 21 project, suggested in his conciliatory appeal on 30 November 2010 that the safety of rail traffic, accessibility and fire safety of the through station should be improved. In addition to improvements to the track, a ninth and tenth platform track at the main station should also be investigated.

On 23 April 2015, the Federal Railway Authority approved, among other things, the construction of two escape staircases per platform and changes to the shells surrounding the four direct entrances from the outside. The planning amendment notice for the displacement of the evacuation staircases planned on the platforms to the ends of the station hall was delayed and is now expected in the summer of 2017.

Ingenhoven reported that the cost of the station at the end of 2017 was "well below" €1 billion.

==== Construction ====
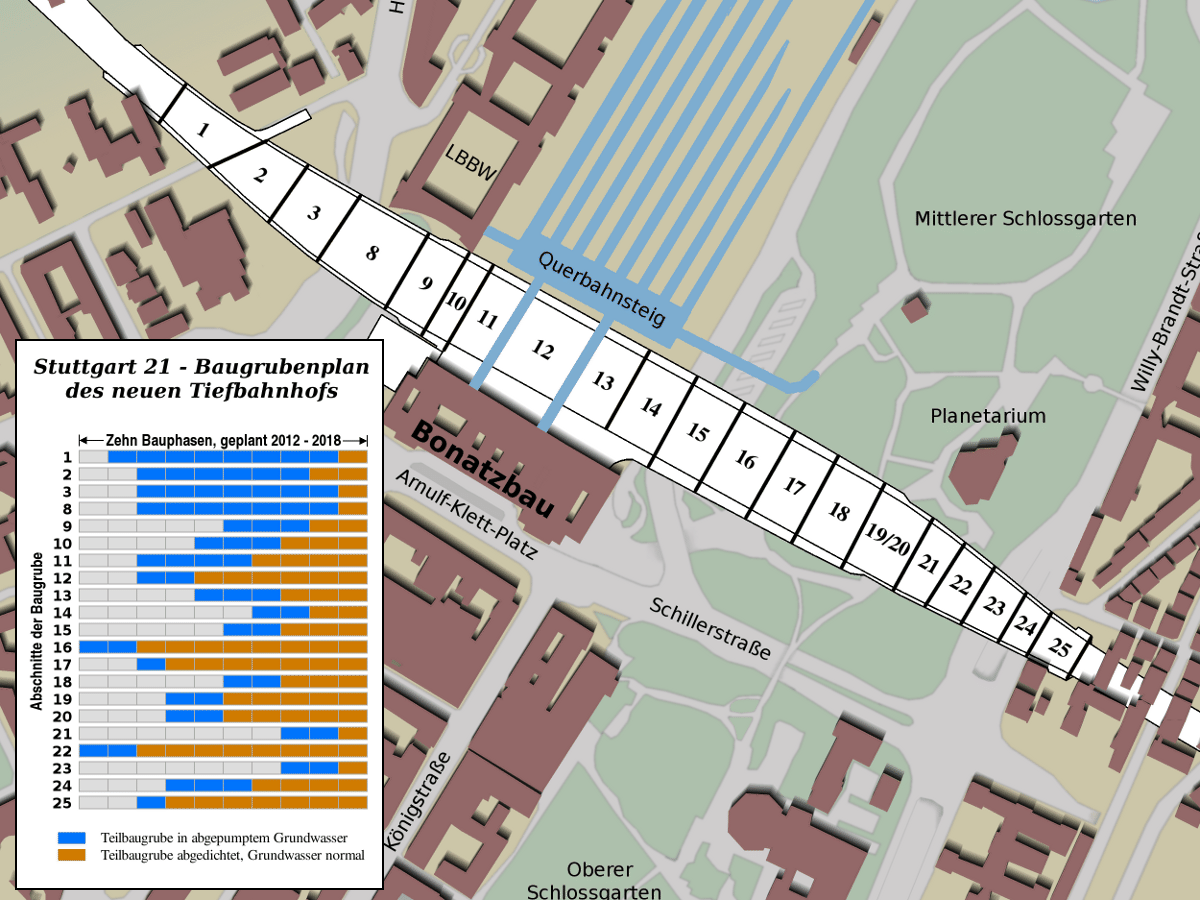
Planned construction phases in the construction pits in the station area

With the symbolic start of construction on 2 February 2010 reconstruction work began on the track apron; these were necessary for the construction of the cross-platform concourse at the end of the platforms.

The contract to demolish the north wing was awarded to Wolff & Müller on 18 May 2010. The establishment of the worksite began on 30 July 2010 under police protection and the demolition of the facade of the north wing began on 25 August 2010.

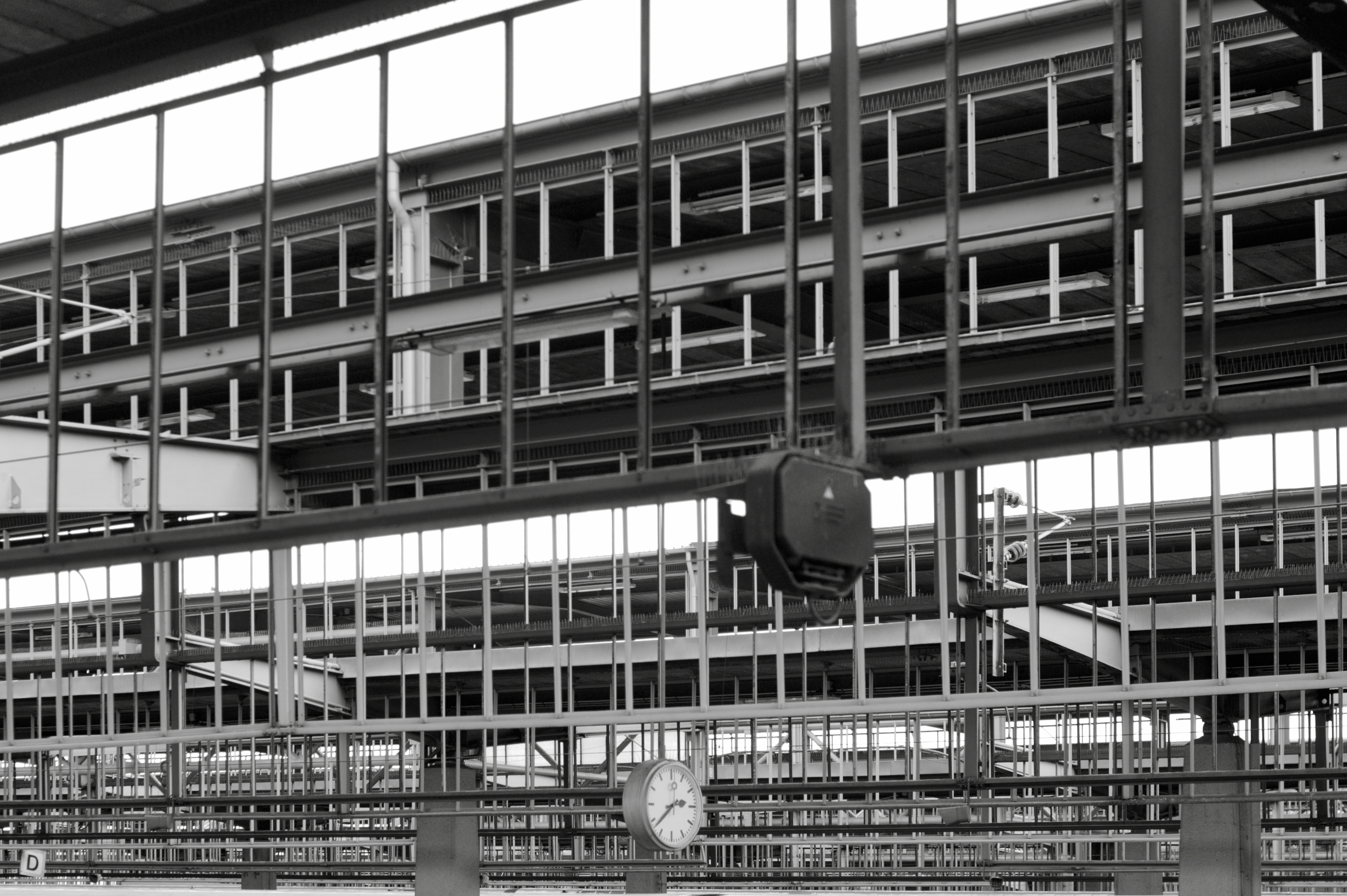
Platform canopies with the glass panels removed (August 2012)

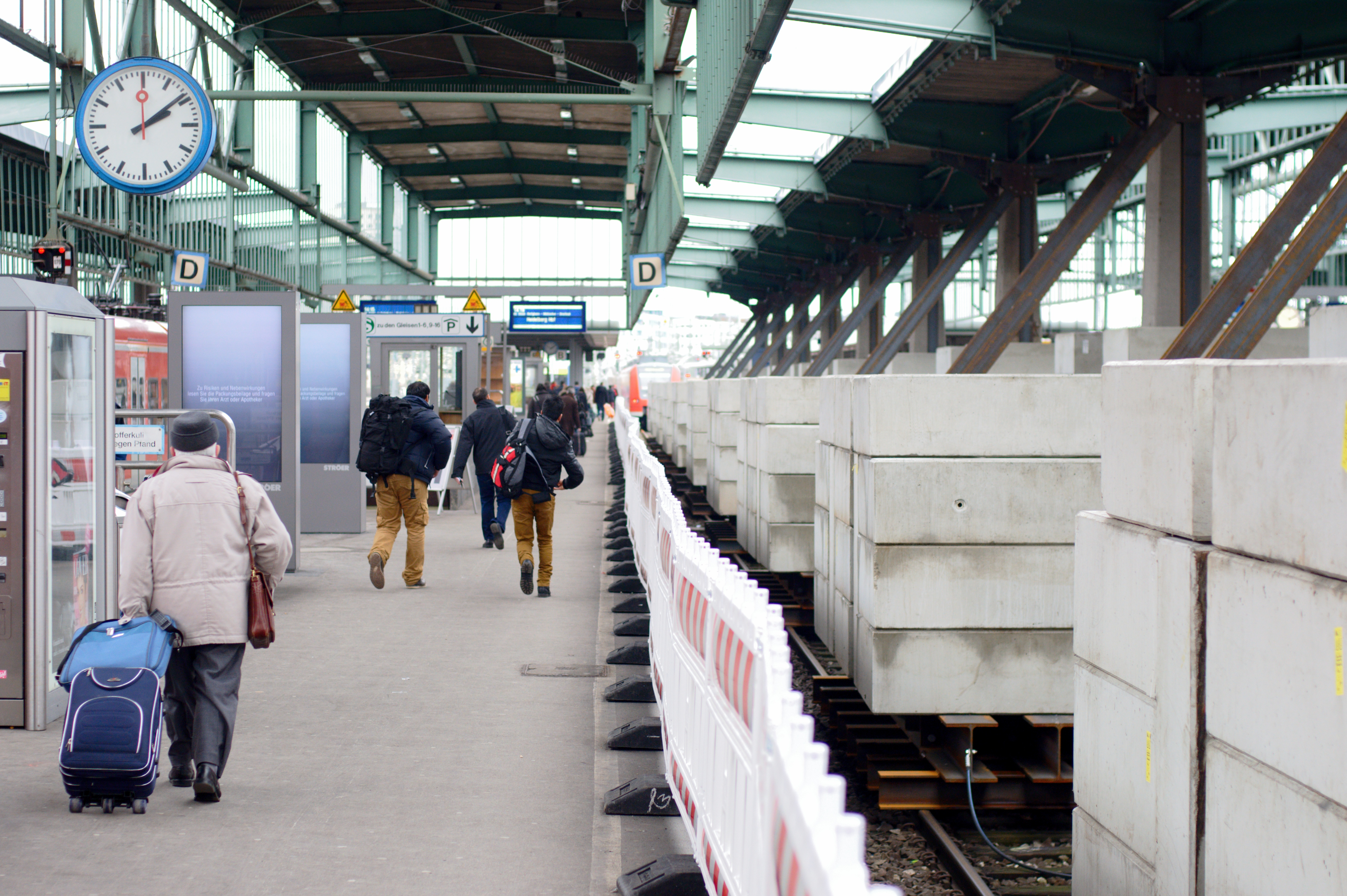
Additional concrete supports to stabilise the platform canopy block part of platform track 8 (December 2012)

Work on the demolition of the south wing began on 13 January 2012 with the gutting of the building. The exterior demolition of the building began on 30 January and was due to be completed in March 2012. After a pillar of the platform canopy was damaged on 19 March, work was suspended for about three weeks. After further damage due to gale-force gusts on 1 July 2012, platform 15/16 was blocked off again and work started on the upgrade of the glass panes on all platform canopies.

The approximately 110-metre (360 ft)-wide excavation was due to be bridged by two ten-metre-wide bridges by April 2014. In addition direct access was to be provided to the cross-platform concourse from both sides. Access to the Europaviertel district on the north side has been possible since 21 October 2013, and on the south side, there has been access via the pedestrian walkways from the Mittlerer Schlossgarten since 24 January 2014. Both entrances are barrier-free.

The repositioning of the cross-platform concourse was postponed several times. According to the planning status of March 2012, the cross-platform concourse was to be gradually advanced between July and December 2012. At the end of June 2012, just over 50 of the 61 planned construction phases had been completed on the track apron. Platform tracks 1 and 2 were re-connected without completing the planned construction of the new S-Bahn tunnel in this area. Construction of the new cross-platform concourse took place from late May 2013 to 22 October 2013 in 13 phases, requiring two platform tracks were blocked off. Deutsche Bahn reduced some train services during this period to reduce congestion of trains at the station. The preliminary work and the commissioning of the cross platform, 120 metres (390 ft) north of its original location, should have taken 18 months to complete, but actually lasted 45 months.

A two-storey underground engineering building of 1,800 square metres (19,000 sq ft) was built under the former parking lot at the northern exit at a planned cost of €7.6 million between April 2012 and October 2013 (when the construction of the shell was completed)

On 12 March 2012, the construction contract for the underground station, including the West, Cannstatter Straße and Nesenbach channels and the station access tunnel, was awarded to a consortium of the Züblin (manager) and Strabag companies. The formal award took place on 24 March 2012. The contract for the construction of the new central station was let for €323.4 million, which was a sliding price under the contract. The internal portion being built by Züblin amounts to around €300 million. Groundwater management is not part of the scope of the contract. The total contract value was €347.4 million in May 2016 and €364 million in August 2016.

At the end of 2010, the lowest tender for the construction of the underground station amounted to about €360 million. The first contract planned to be let in late 2011 was delayed over price negotiations. Also technical questions led to delays. In addition to successful negotiations, technical optimisations, such as a change in the type of concrete, would have contributed to savings, according to a media report. Deutsche Bahn had calculated a price of €300 million based on its own data.

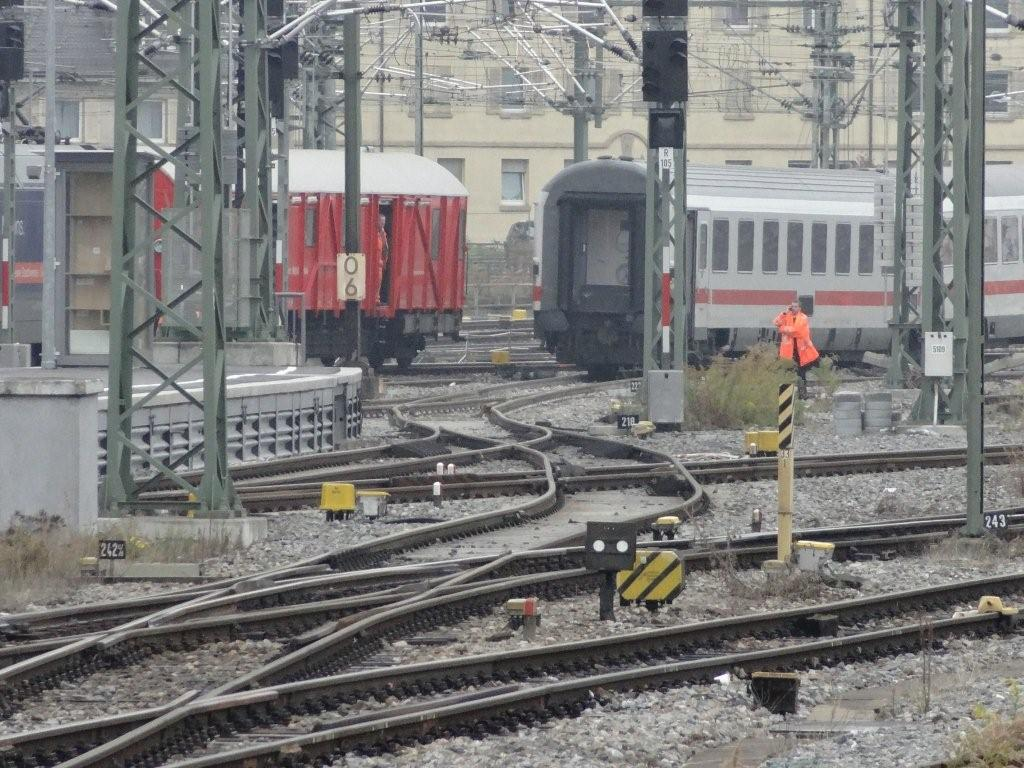
Derailed carriage in the turnout area (9 October 2012)

In July, September and October 2012 trains derailed on the exit towards Feuerbach, which had been rebuilt in the course of the Stuttgart 21 project. Following the latest derailment, platform tracks 8, 9 and 10 were blockaded. In January 2013, Deutsche Bahn justified the derailments as being the result of "malfunctioning carriage buffers". A short-term technical solution developed by DB was rejected by the Federal Railway Authority. The suspension also led to far-reaching delays of S-Bahn and regional services. On 22 January 2013, track 10 was conditionally released for service. Only multiple units and hauled trains could use it. According to Federal Railway Authority data, the unrestricted clearance of the track was not possible on the basis of documents that had been submitted. According to Deutsche Bahn in December 2014, an end to these restrictions was not foreseeable.

In March 2012, the beginning of civil engineering work was scheduled for early 2013. The civil works on the excavation of the station began on 5 August 2014 at pit 16 in the Mittleren Schlossgarten. A mid-2013 timetable for the excavation work in the Mittleren Schlossgarten was considered obsolete by mid-2014. Out of 14 construction stages planned so far, 7 had been realised and the work had been delayed by about five months.

An already issued statistical proof of the safety of the station has not applied since 2014 due to changed legal requirements and a renewal is pending. Civil engineering work at the station was stopped at the beginning of March 2015 because a permit from the Federal Railway Authority for the construction of additional escape staircases was missing. The work was thus eight months late compared with early projections.

On 26 January 2016, one year later than scheduled under the August 2014 timetable, work began on casting the floor slab in the first excavation pit of the station, initially as the base plate in what is known as the Medienkanal (middle channel).

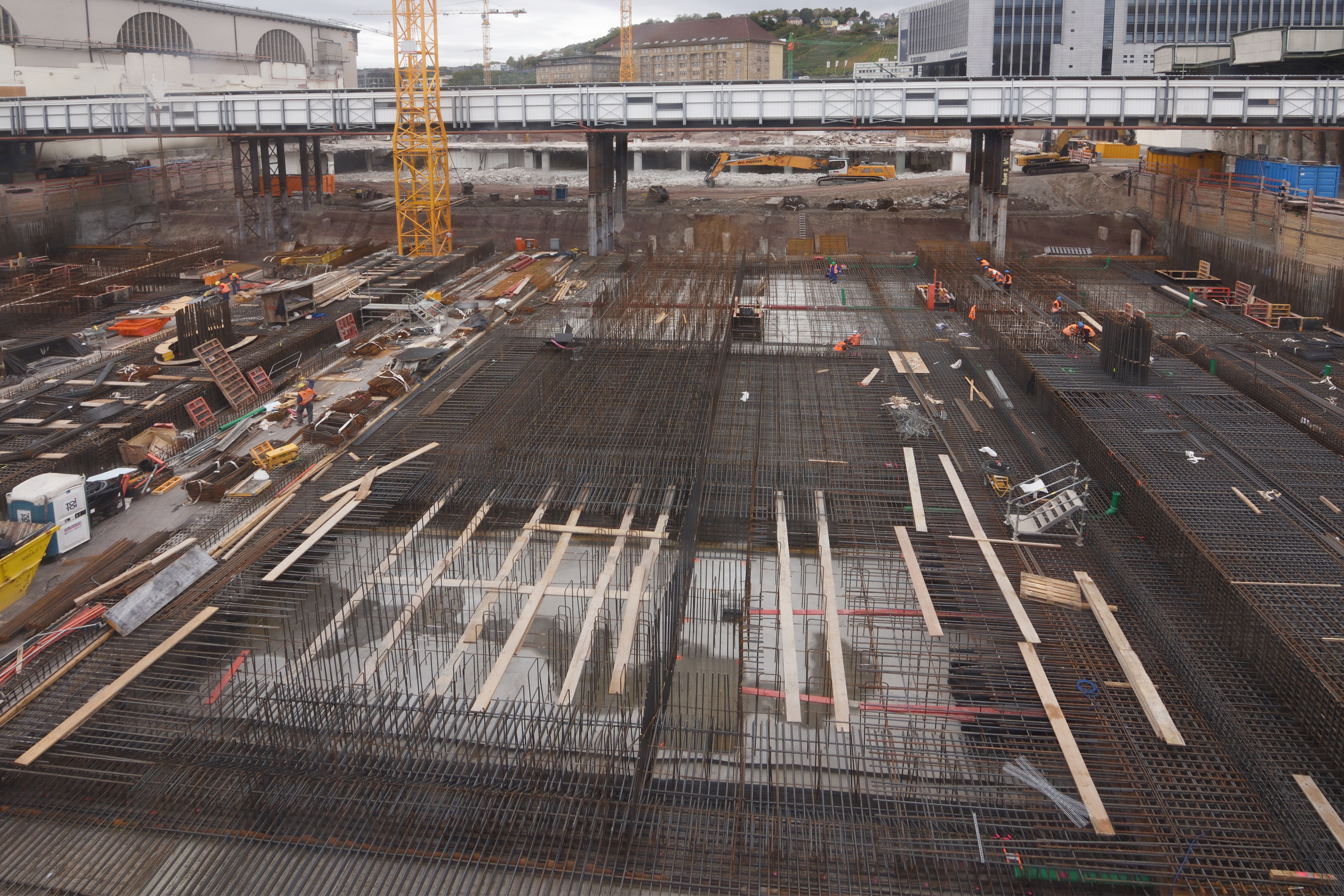
Construction work in the middle part of the future platform hall (October 2017)

The concreting of the first roof stanchions was due to start in June 2017. The 28 columns are to be concreted two at a time.

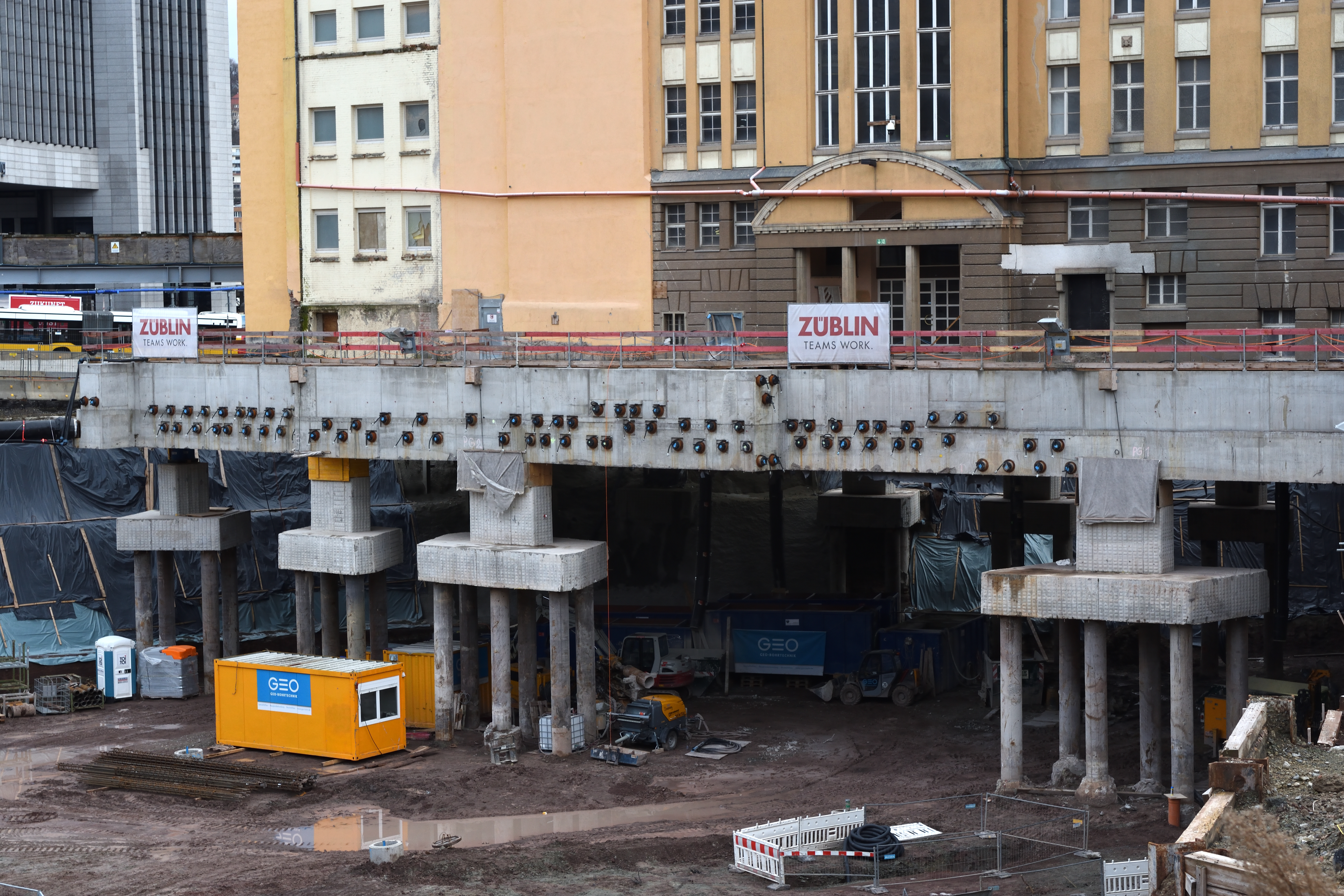
The former DB divisional headquarters set on pillars (December 2017)

In mid-2017, the building of the former Deutsche Bahndirektion (Deutsche Bahn divisional headquarters) was undermined and placed on a 1.3 m (4 ft 3 in) thick concrete slab. This rests in turn on some supports, between which the construction machinery and vehicles can operate. DB had sought the demolition and reconstruction of the building built in 1911–1912. The city of Stuttgart, however, insisted on its preservation.

=== Groundwater management ===
The groundwater has been lowered by approximately seven metres by pumping for the construction of the excavations. The resulting funnel of lowered groundwater usually extends for several hundred metres. In order to reduce the disturbance, water is reintroduced (infiltration via injection well) in the vicinity of the construction excavations. The groundwater must be treated prior to being reintroduced to reduce possible pollution.

The management of groundwater was originally expected to involve around 3,000,000 cubic metres (110,000,000 cu ft) of groundwater. Following a change in the plan at the beginning of 2011, this figure doubled to 6,800,000 cubic metres (240,000,000 cu ft), necessitating an amendment to the license in relation to its scope and impact.

The groundwater management was expected to start in January 2013. On 25 June 2012, it was announced that a public hearing was required to consider Deutsche Bahn's proposal to double the groundwater withdrawal to 6,800,000 cubic metres (240,000,000 cu ft), delaying the construction work (according to media reports, to 2014). According to its own statements, Deutsche Bahn's planned to open excavation pits requiring less groundwater withdrawals in the spring of 2013 and thus comply with the planning approval decision (which stipulates lower withdrawal quantities). According to a media report, however, the Federal Railway Authority and the Stuttgart Regional Council assumed that the construction work would not begin before 2014. The Federal Railway Authority approved the increased groundwater abstraction on 22 September 2014.

=== Future ===
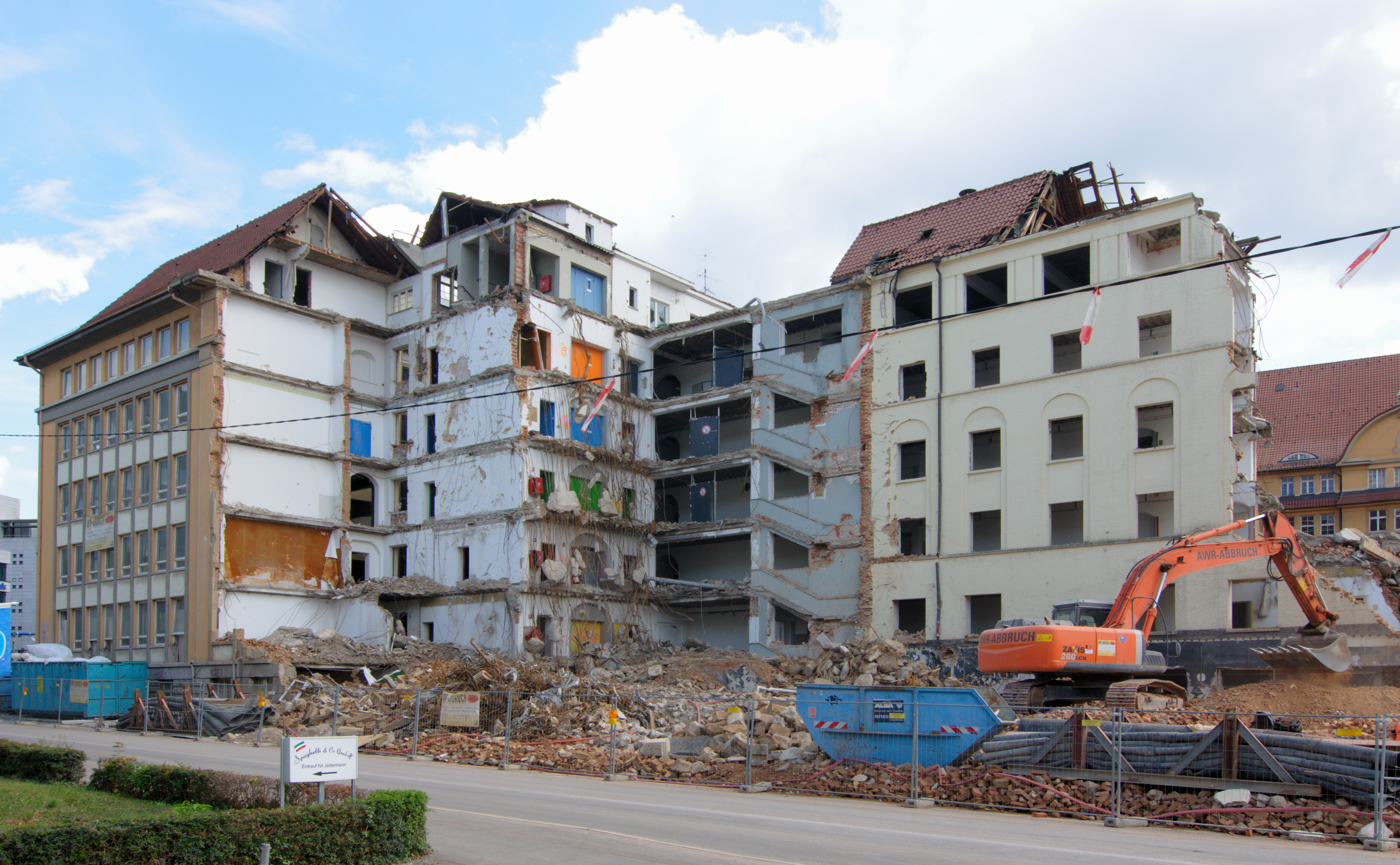
Demolition work on the rear section of the former Deutsche Bahn divisional headquarters in Heilbronner Straße in August 2012

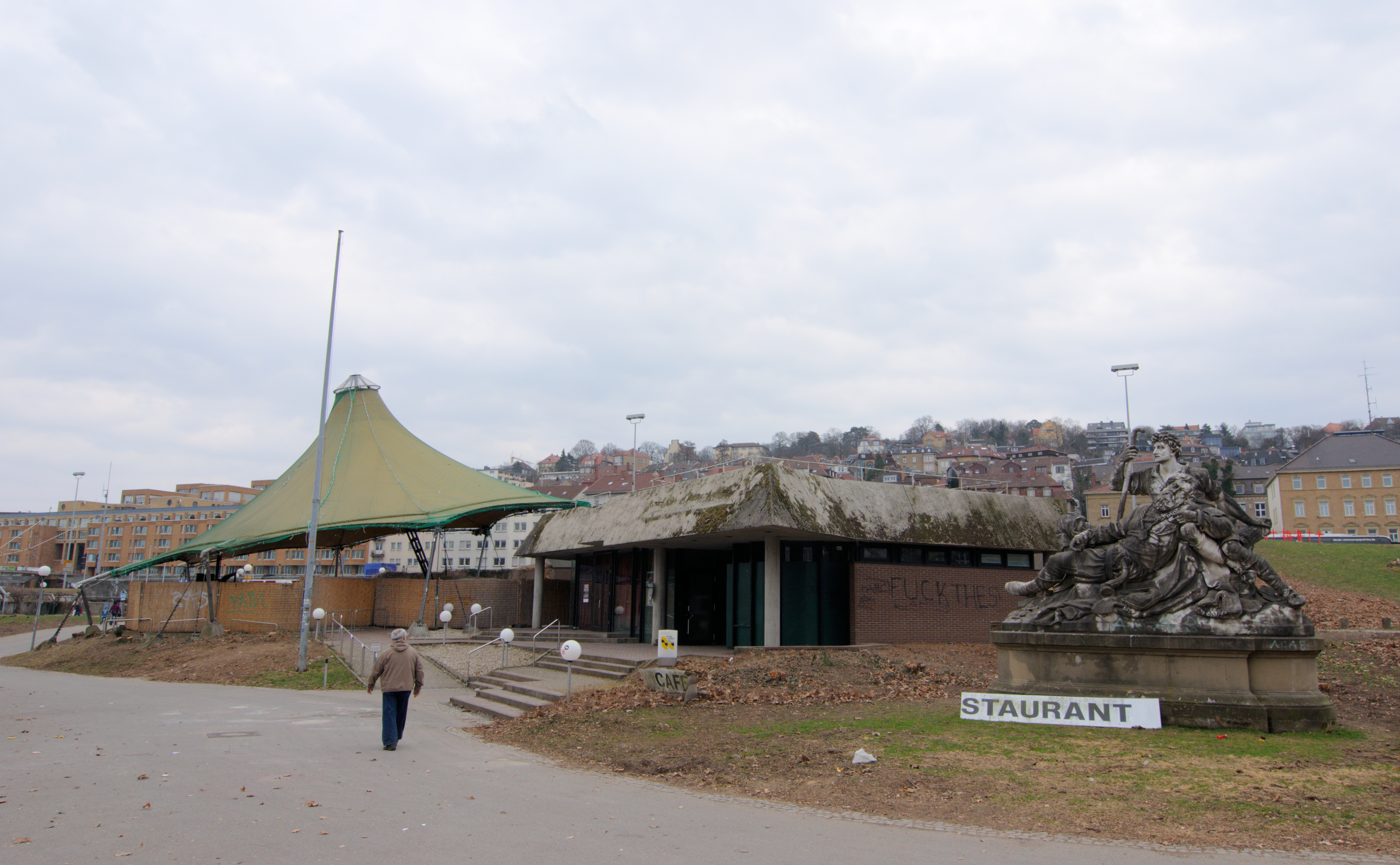
The state pavilion (here in March 2012) was located above the southern part of the planned station and was demolished in the course of construction in August 2012.

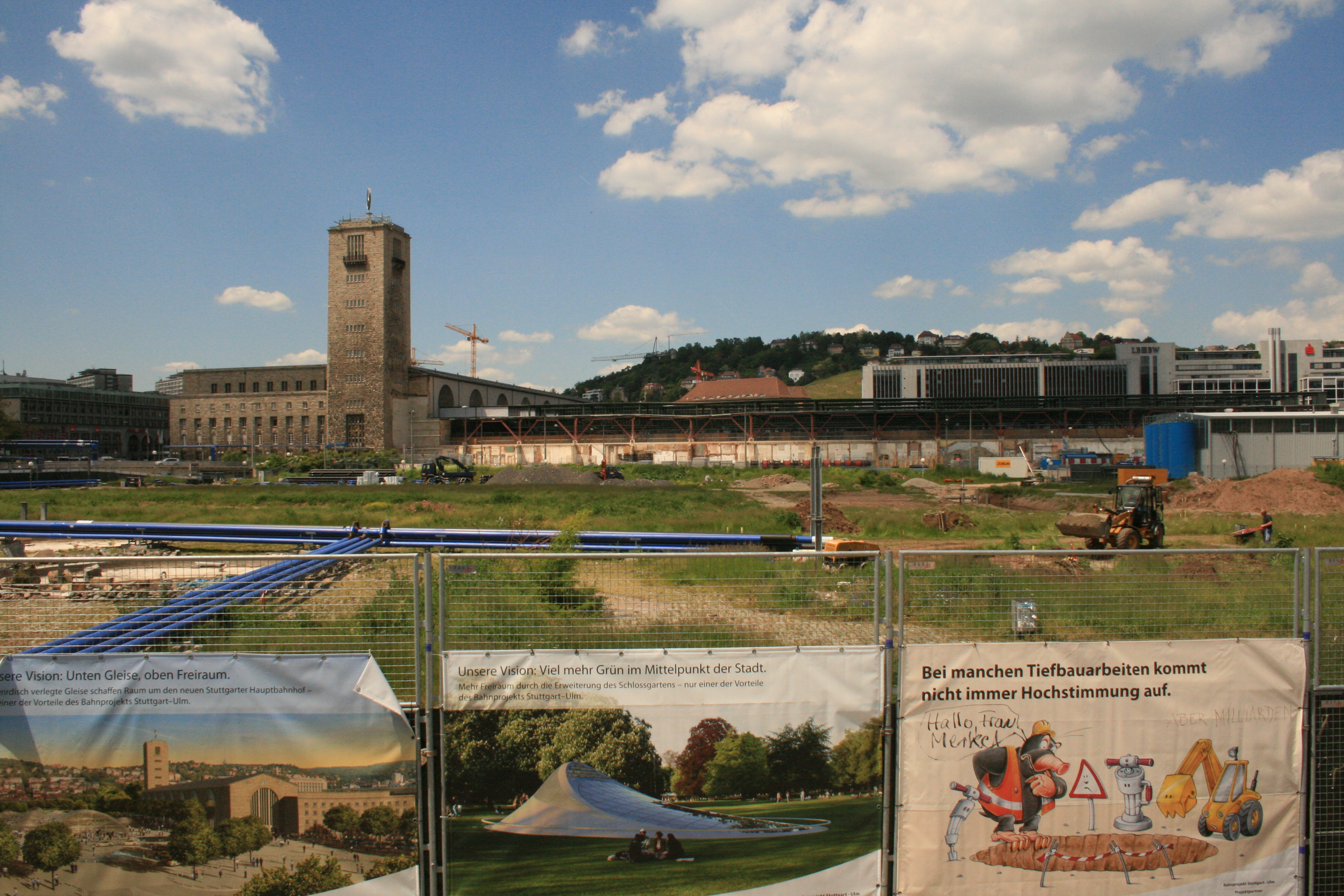
Fenced area for the construction of the planned station in the Mittleren Schlossgarten (June 2013)

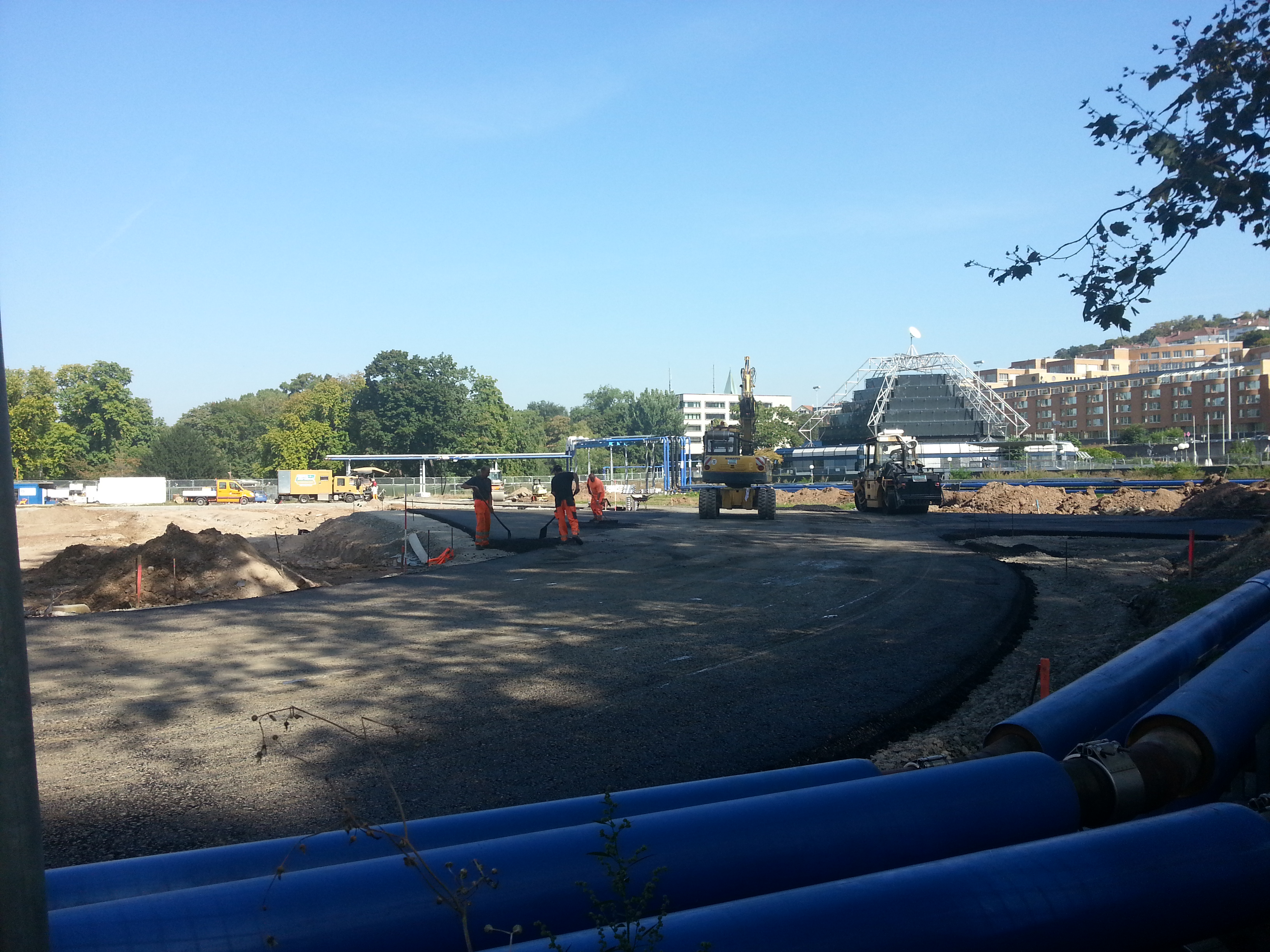
Construction tracks being constructed in the Mittlerer Schlossgarten, on the grounds of the planned station (September 2013)

It is planned to successively carry out the construction of the valley crossing and the station in 25 subsections. The shell of the station was expected to be completed by the end of 2017 (as of January 2011). The Staatsgalerie Stadtbahn station is being relocated to the south side of the future station. Preparatory measures started at the end of 2014, when completion was scheduled for 2019/2020 at the latest.

The excavated material is transported via separate construction roads and a conveyor belt to a central logistics area at Stuttgart Nord station and transported from there on freight trains. The commissioning of the new station is scheduled for December 2021.

A traffic forecast for 2025 anticipates around 207,600 long-distance and regional passengers, including 118,800 from the direction of Feuerbach and Bad Cannstatt and 88,800 from the Filder Tunnel, Obertürkheim or Untertürkheim. The accessibility of the Stuttgart Hauptbahnhof traffic cell by public transport from the Stuttgart region, based on weighted average traffic demand, should improve, according to a traffic forecast from 32 minutes (2010) to 31 minutes (2025).

Stuttgarter Netz AG, a consortium of several private railway companies, intends to operate part of the existing terminal station. The company expects up to 100 trains to stop at the station every working day. Eight tracks of the terminal station, the access tracks from Bad Cannstatt, Feuerbach and Vaihingen and the existing signal box would be preserved for this purpose. Overall, a quarter of the existing area would be preserved. The calculated annual costs of €1.6 million are expected to be offset by revenue from train and station operations of €1.8 million. Among other things, secondary lines such as the Schönbuch and the Wieslauf Valley Railways would be connected with Stuttgart Hauptbahnhof.

=== Rail operations ===
According to a simulation commissioned by the promoters, the optimum performance range of the through station lies between 42 and 51 trains per hour, while for an upgraded terminal station (the Kopfbahnhof 21 concept) it would be 28 to 38 trains per hour. The maximum flow will be 72 trains in the through station or 43 trains per hour in the terminal station. In 2002, Deutsche Bahn estimated a capacity increase of 50 percent for the 8-track through station compared to the 16-track terminal station; with an upgrade of the approach tracks from Feuerbach, 125 percent more trains would be able to run during the peak.

Critics doubt these claims. Nahverkehrsgesellschaft Baden-Württemberg (a state agency that helps coordinate public transport operations) confirmed its opinion that the existing terminal station could already carry 50 trains and, with improved signalling technology, it would carry 56 trains an hour.

== In popular culture ==
- This rail station is mentioned in the Volkslied Auf de schwäbsche Eisebahne.

== See also ==
- Rail transport in Germany
- Railway stations in Germany
