= Karlsruhe–Mühlacker railway =

Railway line in the west of Baden-Württemberg, Germany

Karlsruhe–Pforzheim–Mühlacker railway
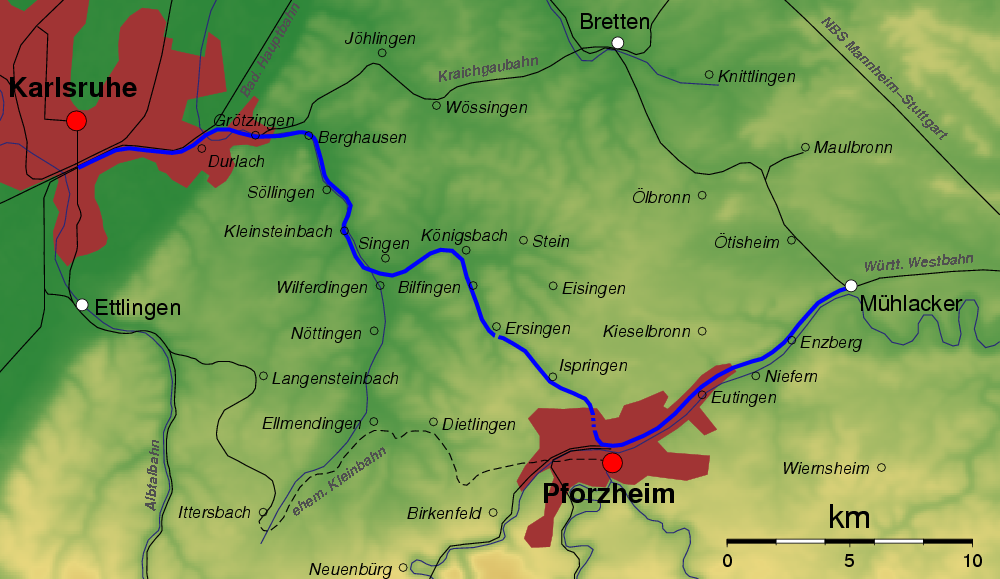

Overview
- Line number: 4200
- Locale: Baden-Württemberg, Germany

Service
- Route number: 770; 710.5 (Karlsruhe Stadtbahn); 772 ("Klosterstadtexpress")

Technical
- Line length: 43.5 km (27.0 mi)
- Track gauge: 1,435 mm (4 ft 8 1/2 in) standard gauge
- Electrification: 15 kV/16.7 Hz AC catenary

The Karlsruhe–Mühlacker railway is a railway line in the west of the German state of Baden-Württemberg. It was built between 1859 and 1863 and is one of the oldest railways in Germany. It was built as the second connection between the networks of the Grand Duchy of Baden State Railway and the Royal Württemberg State Railways and it still constitutes an important east–west route in southern Germany.

The starting point at the Baden end was originally Durlach, where it connects with the Rhine Valley Railway. The line was later extended to the old Karlsruhe station. From Durlach the line runs through the Pfinz and Kämpfelbach valleys, passing over the watershed between the Rhine and Neckar in a tunnel near Pforzheim, and follows the Enz river east of Pforzheim to Mühlacker.

Since the end of 2010, Deutsche Bahn has called the line between Stuttgart and Karlsruhe (consisting of this line and part of the Württemberg Western Railway) the Residenzbahn ("Royal Palace Railway"). This name was the result of a public competition.

== History ==
=== Construction of the line ===
In the 1840s, the first negotiations were held on a link between the Baden and Württemberg rail networks, connecting Karlsruhe and Stuttgart via Pforzheim, but they failed due to a disagreement on the route. Baden saw the line as having two important tasks: on the one hand, connecting the industrial town of Pforzheim to the rail network, on the other hand, the creation of a possible direct connection between France, southern Germany and the Austrian Empire.

A treaty signed in 1850 incorporated a compromise solution that provided for the construction of the Western Railway from Stuttgart to Bruchsal, while allowing the state of Baden to build a branch line via Pforzheim to Karlsruhe. For this reason, the Western Railway ran slightly further south that it might have in order that a junction station could be built at Eckenweiher Hof in the district of Dürrmenz.

After Baden's difficult financial and political situation following the Revolution in Baden in 1848–49 had eased and the main project of the Baden State Railways, the Rhine Valley Railway had been completed from Mannheim to Basel in 1855, Baden could turn to its previously deferred construction project. An additional boost was given to the project by an agreement in 1857 on the construction of a railway bridge over the Rhine at Kehl, connecting the Baden and French railway networks. This was completed in 1861, producing an east–west connection.

In 1856 the Wurttemberg government asked if it should take over the building of the Mühlacker–Pforzheim line. Construction of this line was necessary before the Enz Valley Railway and the Nagold Valley Railway could be built. These two valleys in the northern Black Forest were mostly in Württemberg, but could only be accessed from Pforzheim in Baden for topographical reasons. Baden, however, insisted on its right, agreed in 1850, to build the track itself.

On 17 December 1857 an international treaty was concluded that regulated the construction of the line. This provided for Baden to build the railway to Mühlacker and for Württemberg in return to build branch lines up the Enz and Nagold valleys from Pforzheim. Moreover, the Durlach–Mühlacker line would be free of Württemberg taxes, as would the Western Railway on Baden territory be free of Baden taxes. The lower chamber of the Baden parliament initially rejected the agreement, but construction of the Baden section of the line was finally approved. The section between Durlach and Wilferdingen was opened on 10 August 1859 and it was completed to Pforzheim on 7 July 1861. In Durlach the line connected with the Baden–Karlsruhe main railway. The originally proposed route between Pforzheim and Wilferdingen via Nöttingen, Ellmendingen and Dietlingen was dropped due to the negative attitude of the communities affected and the route via Ellmendingen and Dietlingen was replaced by a route along the Kämpfelbach Valley via Königsbach, Ersingen and Ispringen.

The agreement with Württemberg was renegotiated, leading to a new treaty being signed on 6 November 1860. The Pforzheim–Mühlacker section was opened on 1 June 1863. For a long time there were two stations side by side in Mühlacker, the Württemberg Railway's through station and the Baden State Railways’ terminus. Trains continuing through Mühlacker changed locomotives until 1890 when the first trains ran from Karlsruhe to Stuttgart without locomotive changes. Mühlacker did not completely lose its role as a border station until the founding of Deutsche Reichsbahn in 1920.

=== Further development ===
The line soon won substantial traffic. Therefore, it two sections were soon duplicated: in 1867 between Wilferdingen and Pforzheim and in 1869 between Durlach and Wilferdingen and between Pforzheim and Mühlacker. Two additional tracks were built to eliminate the bottleneck between Karlsruhe and Durlach, which was used by both the Karlsruhe–Mühlacker and the Baden Main Line in the first decades; as a result the Karlsruhe–Mühlacker line now began in Karlsruhe Hauptbahnhof (central station). With the construction of Durlach station in 1911 the route to Pforzheim took a slightly different route in this area. On 1 June 1958 the Karlsruhe–Mühlacker line was electrified, closing the gap in the electrical network between the already electrified Rhine Valley Railway and the Württemberg Western Railway.

Over time, several railway lines of mainly local importance connected with the Karlsruhe–Mühlacker line:

- the Enz Valley Railway from Pforzheim to Wildbad (1868)
- the Nagold Valley Railway from Pforzheim to Calw (1874)
- the Kraichgau Railway from Grötzingen to Heilbronn (1879)

A short walk from Pforzheim Hauptbahnhof to Leopoldplatz was the station of the Pforzheim Light Railway (Pforzheimer Kleinbahn), which operated to Ittersbach from 1901 to 1968.

The line has always been an important link for international east–west traffic as part of the shortest route between Paris and Vienna. From 1883 services of the Orient Express ran on this line from Paris to Istanbul. By 1939 the line was used by ten long distance "D-trains" (D-Zug, express trains using carriages with corridors) every day from west to east and seven D-trains from east to west. Five pairs of trains ran to/from Paris and three pairs of trains to/from Vienna. Pairs of trains ran to/from Prague and Warsaw (via Nuremberg) and to/from Wuppertal (via Neustadt an der Weinstrasse and Bad Kreuznach). Added to this were three services per week of the Orient Express and five services per day from west to east and seven express services from east to west between Karlsruhe and Stuttgart. The intercity trains took 85 to 90 minutes on the route from Karlsruhe to Stuttgart.

After the Second World War services at first were less than before the war: the age of luxury train was over, and thus the Orient Express was replaced by a regular express train, but it continued to be called the Orient Express. From 1954, the service was replaced by the Mozart Express between Paris and Salzburg (from 1964 continuing to Vienna). Express or EuroCity trains continued on the line to 2003.

In 1991 the D-trains on the line were replaced by InterRegio and InterCity services at two-hour intervals, significantly improving services. Thanks to the opening of the Mannheim–Stuttgart high-speed line long-distance trains on the new line to Stuttgart were accelerated between Vaihingen and Stuttgart. These services needed just 52 minutes for the route from Karlsruhe to Stuttgart, with stops in Pforzheim, Mühlacker and Vaihingen. However the Karlsruhe–Pforzheim–Mühlacker line was also affected by the new line, as the quickest route from Karlsruhe to Stuttgart no longer ran via Pforzheim but via Bruchsal. In 2003, some InterRegio services were replaced by InterCity trains running on the Karlsruhe–Stuttgart–Nuremberg route.

=== Karlsruhe Stadtbahn ===
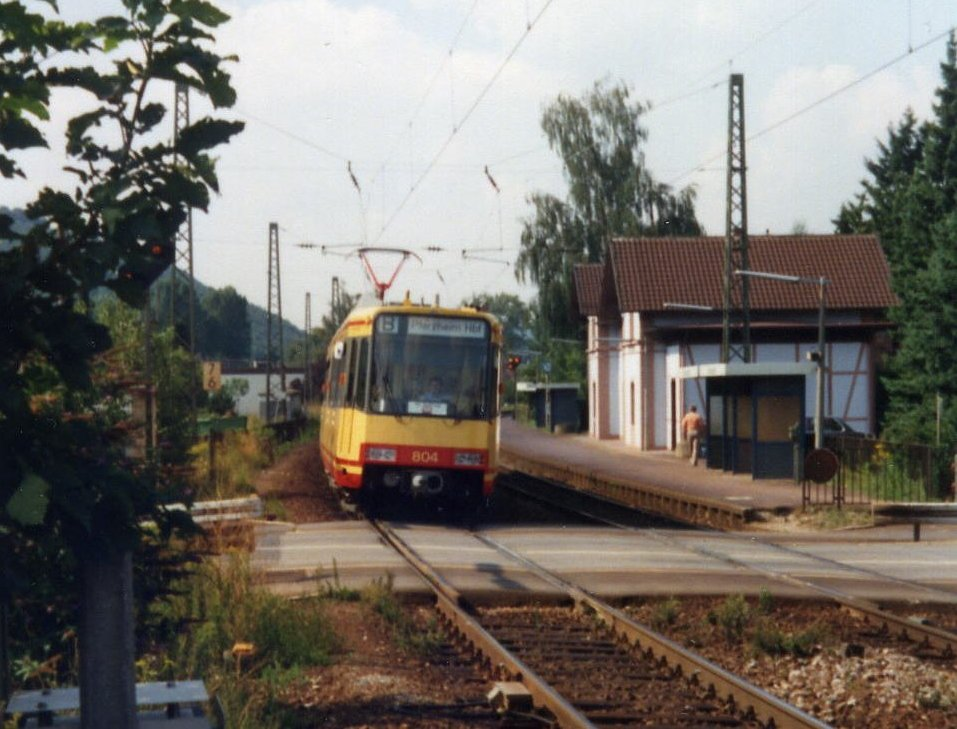
Stadtbahn train running from Karlsruhe to Pforzheim at Söllingen station in 1991.

In the 1980s, the city of Karlsruhe developed plans to build a Stadtbahn (tram-train) system, including regional rail services, which later became known as the Karlsruhe model. It was envisaged at the outset that the line between Durlach and Wilferdingen would be included in order to stimulate transport between Karlsruhe and the communities of Pfinztal and Remchingen. In 1992 planning of the route was extended to include Pforzheim.

However, since the proposed service frequency could not be executed on the existing tracks, additional infrastructure was added between Grötzingen and Söllingen, including an additional track which is served only by the Stadtbahn. Seven new Stadtbahn stops were also opened between Pforzheim and Grötzingen.

Even before the construction of the additional track, dual-system light rail vehicles of the Albtal-Verkehrs-Gesellschaft (Alb Valley Transport Company, AVG) began running between Karlsruhe Hauptbahnhof and Pforzheim in 1991. Full Stadtbahn operations commenced on 31 May 1997. This service switches between the single track Stadtbahn line and the double-track main line operated by Deutsche Bahn in Söllingen. The operation of local services on the Karlsruhe–Pforzheim line in is now carried out as Stadtbahn line S5, but it no longer runs to the Hauptbahnhof, instead it runs to central Karlsruhe over tram lines. In 1999, Stadtbahn operations were extended from Pforzheim to Bietigheim-Bissingen.

== Operations ==
=== Route ===
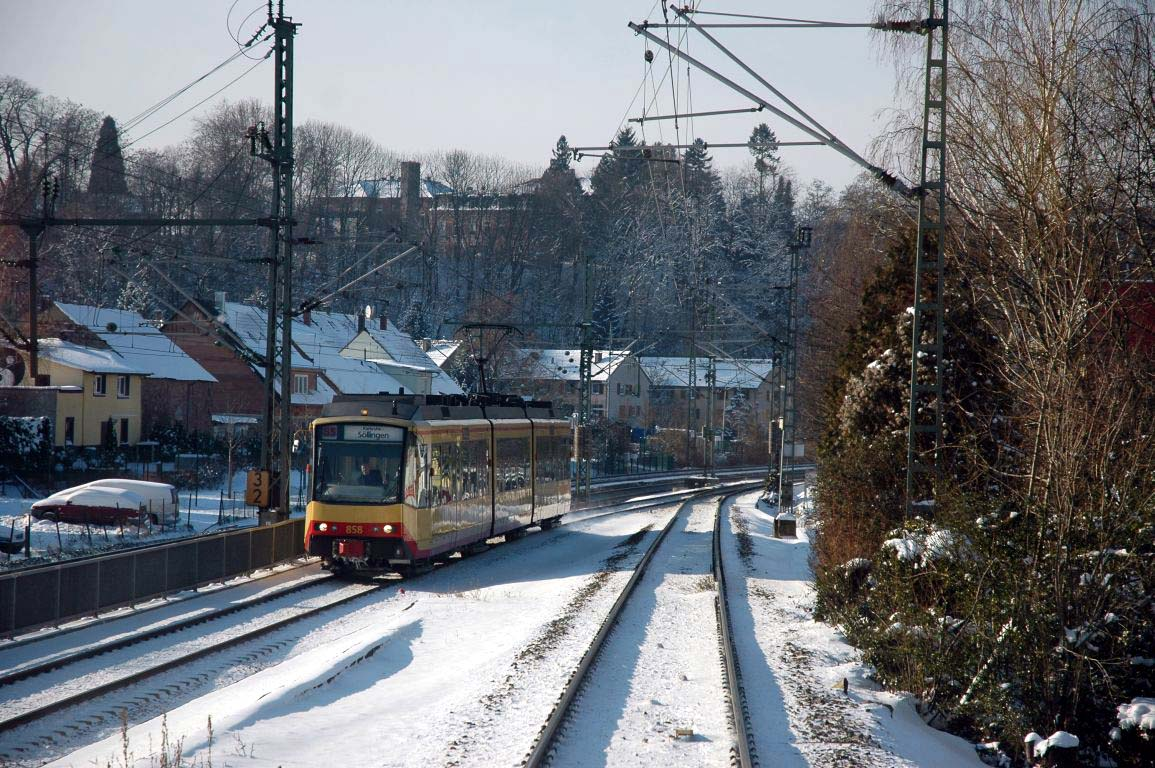
Karlsruhe Stadtbahn line S5 service at the junction with the Kraichgau Railway at Oberaustraße stop

The main line is operated by Deutsche Bahn, as a double-track electrified main line. In 1941, a connecting curve was built in Mühlacker from the former terminus of the Baden State Railways on track 50 to the Western Railway towards Bretten so that direct trains between Pforzheim and Bruchsal would not have to reverse in Mühlacker.

Wilferdingen-Singen station is called Remchingen by the Karlsruhe Transport Association (Karlsruher Verkehrsverbund) for Stadtbahn services, while Deutsche Bahn uses the old name for its services.

The Stadtbahn track between Grötzingen and Söllingen is operated by AVG as a single-track branch line. There are passing loops at Krappmühlenweg and Berghausen. In Söllingen a two-track terminus has been built. In Grötzingen station and north of Söllingen Reetzstraße station there are crossovers to the Deutsche Bahn main line.

=== Passenger ===
In long-distance transport, the Karlsruhe–Mühlacker–Stuttgart line is served every two hours by InterCity trains, stopping in Karlsruhe Hauptbahnhof, Pforzheim, Mühlacker, Vaihingen (Enz) and in the off-peak in Durlach. On 14 December 2008 the Orient Express was replaced by a EuroNight train between Strasbourg and Vienna due to the opening of the LGV Est. In December 2009 this service was abandoned.

InterCity service run every two hours alternating with Interregio-Express services every two hours between Karlsruhe and Stuttgart, with stops in Durlach, Pforzheim, Mühlacker and Vaihingen (Enz). In addition, Regional-Express services run every two hours via Bietigheim-Bissingen with an additional stop in Wilferdingen-Singen, then stopping at all stations between Pforzheim and Bietigheim-Bissingen and at Ludwigsburg and Stuttgart.

In regional transport, the line is now part of Stadtbahn line S5 of the AVG on the Wörth–Karlsruhe–Pforzheim–Mühlacker–Bietigheim-Bissingen route. This provides a weekday service at 10-minute intervals between Karlsruhe and Pfinztal, at least every 30 minutes between Pfinztal and Pforzheim and at least hourly east of Pforzheim.

The whole length of the line is in the common fare system of the Karlsruhe Transport Association and between Wilferdingen-Singen and Mühlacker it is included in the Pforzheim-Enz District Transport Association (Verkehrsverbund Pforzheim-Enzkreis).

=== Freight ===
The line is also used for freight, including complete trains running from the Karlsruhe refinery to Ingolstadt. Of the intermediate stations, freight traffic only serves Pforzheim station. However, freight wagons are sometimes parked at Wilferdingen-Singen station.
