= Vaihingen station =

Vaihingen station may refer to:

- Stuttgart-Vaihingen station, Stuttgart
- Vaihingen (Enz) station, Vaihingen an der Enz

== See also ==
- Vaihingen (disambiguation)
