= Württemberg Western Railway =

Railway line in Germany

Western Railway
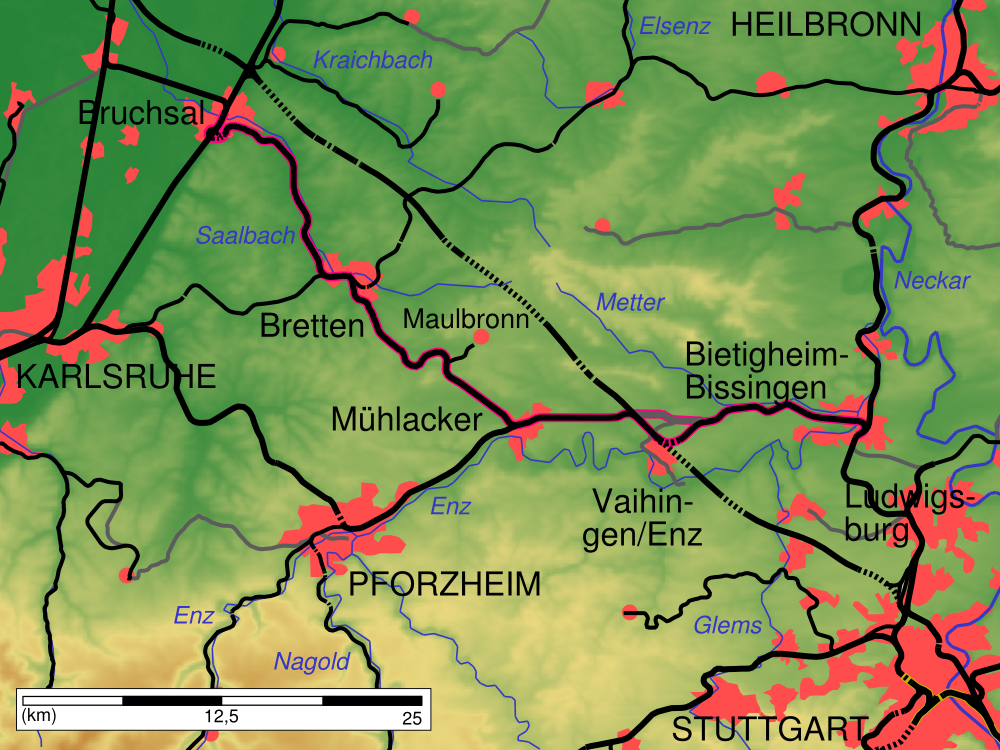

Overview
- Native name: Westbahn
- Line number: 4130 (Bruchsal–Bretten); 4131 (Güterstr. Bruchsal); 4800 (Bietigheim-B.–Bretten); 4842 (NBS Sersheim–Illingen); 4843 (Aischb.–Vaih. Nord)
- Locale: Baden-Württemberg, Germany
- Termini: Bietigheim-Bissingen; Bruchsal

Service
- Route number: 770; 710.5, 710.9 (Stadtbahn lines); 772 (Klosterstadtexpress)

Technical
- Line length: 52.529 km (32.640 mi)
- Track gauge: 1,435 mm (4 ft 8 1/2 in) standard gauge
- Minimum radius: 300 m (984 ft)
- Electrification: 15 kV/16.7 Hz AC overhead catenary
- Operating speed: 140 km/h (87.0 mph) (maximum)
- Maximum incline: 1.0%

Planning options for the Westbahn

The Western Railway (German: Westbahn) in Württemberg was opened in 1853 and ran from Bietigheim-Bissingen to Bruchsal. It was the first railway link between the states of Württemberg and Baden in Germany and one of the oldest lines in Germany.

Formerly an important link line in national and international long-distance traffic, it has largely lost that role since the opening of the Mannheim–Stuttgart high-speed railway and primarily handles regional and goods traffic between the cities of Stuttgart, Karlsruhe, Mannheim and Heidelberg. The line links the Württemberg Northern Railway with the Baden Mainline, crossing the Bietigheim Enz Valley Viaduct and passing through Mühlacker and Bretten.

== Route ==
In Bietigheim-Bissingen the Western Railway branches off from the Franconia Railway (Stuttgart–Heilbronn–Würzburg) in turning left and crosses the Bietigheim Enz Valley Viaduct. After that it runs on the slope above the Metter river until it passes through a tunnel to reach Vaihingen (Enz) station. In Mühlacker, where the line to Karlsruhe branches off, the Western Railway turns to the northeast towards Bretten where the Kraichgau line intersects.

The line runs along the valley of the Saalbach and ends in Bruchsal. The line bypasses Bruchsal's old town by running to the south and looping back to the north through several tunnels. A short tunnel passes under the cemetery; two longer, parallel tunnels enable the line to reach Bruchsal station, while keeping regional and freight traffic separate.

Between Bietigheim-Bissingen and Vaihingen the Western Railway runs within the Ludwigsburg district, from Illingen to Kleinvillars it crossed the Enz district and the rest of the line to Bruchsal is located in the Karlsruhe district.

== History ==
The Western Railway was the first link between the railway networks of the Grand Duchy of Baden and Kingdom of Württemberg. It linked the Baden Mainline in Bruchsal with the Württemberg Northern Railway in Bietigheim. The Western Railway was thus an important element in creating an all-German railway network. Its construction, however, was preceded by years of conflict, because Baden and Wuerttemberg had different interests.

=== Negotiations between Baden and Württemberg ===
The Western Railway was a project undertaken by Württemberg, which began planning its main lines in 1835 (see also History of railways in Württemberg). These were the beginning of the idea of a future interconnected network, which would also develop in other nearby countries (Baden, Bavaria and Switzerland). The Western Railway, in this context, would meet Württemberg need to connect with the Rhine valley, but also provide a connection from Western Germany and France to Bavaria and South East Germany, which, it was believed, would make the Württemberg railways financially viable.

In 1840, Baden had begun the construction of its Rhine Valley Railway from Mannheim to Heidelberg, Bruchsal, Durlach and Karlsruhe, and later to Basel and Constance. Württemberg's desire to establish a connection to the Rhine Valley line led Baden, on the one hand, to fear Württemberg's competition in trade with the region around Lake Constance and Switzerland and, on the other hand, to welcome the prospect of being able to participate in east–west traffic. There were for a long time conflicts over the choice of the point of connection and over technical parameters, such as track gauge.

For the route there were essentially three options considered, which were in order from north to south:

1. from Heilbronn to Wiesloch
2. from the Württemberg Northern Railway branching off north of Ludwigsburg to Bretten and Bruchsal
3. from the Württemberg network to Pforzheim and from there to Durlach

The first option would have been favourable for Württemberg since it would have led to operations over a longer section of its own network. For this reason, and because it was unfavourable for transport to Karlsruhe, Baden rejected it outright. It thus played no serious role in the negotiations.

The second option (called the Bretten line) was championed by Württemberg, the third (the Pforzheim line) by Baden. Baden wished to provide a rail connection through Pforzheim (which was an important industrial city) and also to keep transit traffic on the Rhine Valley Railway as long as possible. A variation of this line that ran through Zuffenhausen, Ditzingen and Friolzheim was also considered, but not considered feasible. The subsequent investigations of this option focused on a line from Pforzheim along the Enz valley to a border crossing at Mühlacker.

Preliminary discussions between the two countries led in the late 1830s to a study of the Pforzheim route by a joint commission, which found it to be suitable for Baden but inappropriate for Württemberg. In 1842, Württemberg asked for an investigation of the Bretten route.

Given the disagreement, the Württemberg railway law of 1843, which authorised the construction of its main lines, initially only stated that a connection should be made to the Baden network, without specifying a route.

In its investigation, the commission acknowledged in 1844 the mutual technical advantages of the Bretten route over the Pforzheim line. Baden, however, continued to press for the latter route and tried in addition, as the only German state with a broad gauge rail network, to require that Württemberg line use Irish gauge (1,600 mm (5 ft 3 in)). Württemberg had, however, already decided in favour of standard gauge for its network.

The Württemberg Diet was inclined to agree to Baden's desire for the Pforzheim route, but only on condition that the Heilbronn–Wiesloch line should be built as well. This solution was offered to Baden but it was rejected. Since an agreement had initially failed, efforts were made to present the other side with a fait accompli. The Wurttemberg government decided to build a railway to the border near Bretten. The Baden parliament proposed to grant a concession to a private company for a Durlach–Pforzheim railway, but found no operator for it.

The March Revolution of 1848/49, which particular affected Baden, delayed the Western Railway. When negotiations recommenced in 1850, Württemberg had already completed other major lines (from Heilbronn to Stuttgart, Ulm and Lake Constance). This strengthened its bargaining position, while Baden's finances had deteriorated as a result of the revolution. As a result, Baden accepted Württemberg's offer to build and operate the entire route at its own cost and gave in on the questions on route and gauge.

=== Planning and building ===
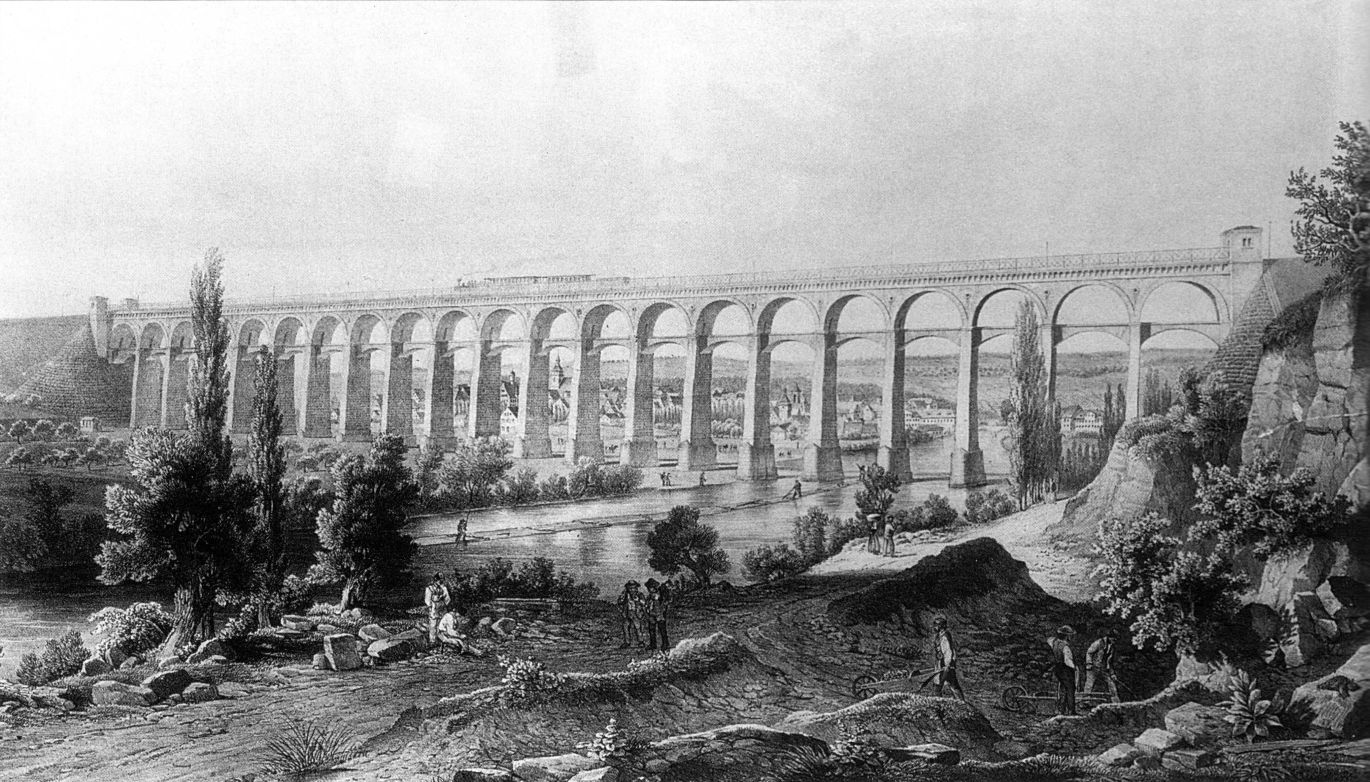
Bietigheimer viaduct in 1855

On 4 December 1850, a treaty was concluded for the construction of the Western Railway. The line would make provision for a junction to a line towards Pforzheim. The railway was built under the direction of Karl Etzel, using standard gauge of 1,435 mm (4 ft 8 1/2 in), which had already become widely accepted in most European countries. The cost of the line came to a total of 11.37 million guilders, which made it the most expensive line per kilometre in Württemberg.

There were greater difficulties for the line in Württemberg, particularly in crossing the deep Enz valley. Initial plans envisaged crossing the river further west, in Bissingen or near the Leudelsbach valley, and then following that valley to Vaihingen. The British rail expert, Charles Vignoles recommended a junction with the Northern Railway in Tamm and the building a large viaduct at the Bissingen saw mill to reach Kleinglattbach and Illingen on a direct route. These alignments had the advantages that they were relatively straightforward; their disadvantages was their need to run through difficult terrain with poor grades and the requirement of a high and long bridge over the Enz.

Karl Etzel proposed in 1845 the more northerly branch in Bietigheim, since the Enz valley was at its narrowest there and therefore a shorter and lower bridge was required than in the previous plans. Although the line would be longer, it would achieve cost savings. Etzel's ideas prevailed, and so the Enz valley viaduct was built at Bietigheimer, with a length of 287 metres and a height of 26 meters, the largest engineering works on the route and very expensive to build. On 13 August 1853 it was inaugurated with great ceremony.

The best route for the line would have been through the Metter valley and via Zaisersweiher to Knittlingen. Taking into account the Baden interest in serving Pforzheim, the line was laid on the slope between the Metter and Enz valleys with provision made for a junction to the north of the hamlet of Mühlacker so that a connection could be later built to Pforzheim. On 17 November 1852, the Maulbronn tunnel was broken through between Ötisheim and Maulbronn, under the watershed between the Rhine and the Enz.

On the Baden side the line ran between Bretten and Bruchsal largely through the valley of the Saalbach. In Bruchsal the route was controversial, as the town's cemetery was on the edge of the old town in the Saalbach valley in the way of the direct route to Baden station. The town of Bruchsal initially opposed a plan to tunnel under the cemetery, since it was thought that it would disturb the peace of the dead. It was then proposed to build a separate terminal station for the Württemberg railway before Bruchsal in the Saalbach valley, which would have avoided the cost of constructing the tunnel, amounting to 200,000 guilders. Passengers and freight would then have to be transported by horse and buggy through the town to Baden station. Ultimately, the town allowed the construction of the 120-metre cemetery tunnel.

=== 1853–1920: developments under the Württemberg and Baden State Railways ===
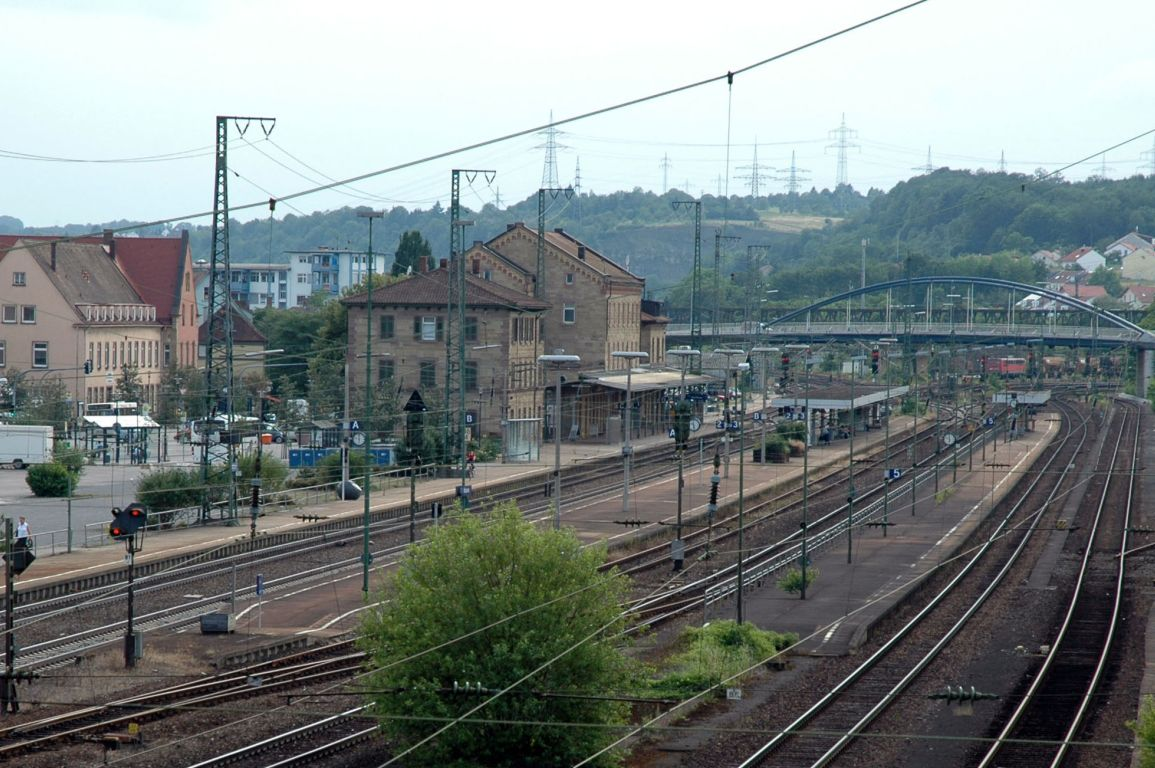
The former border station of Mühlacker

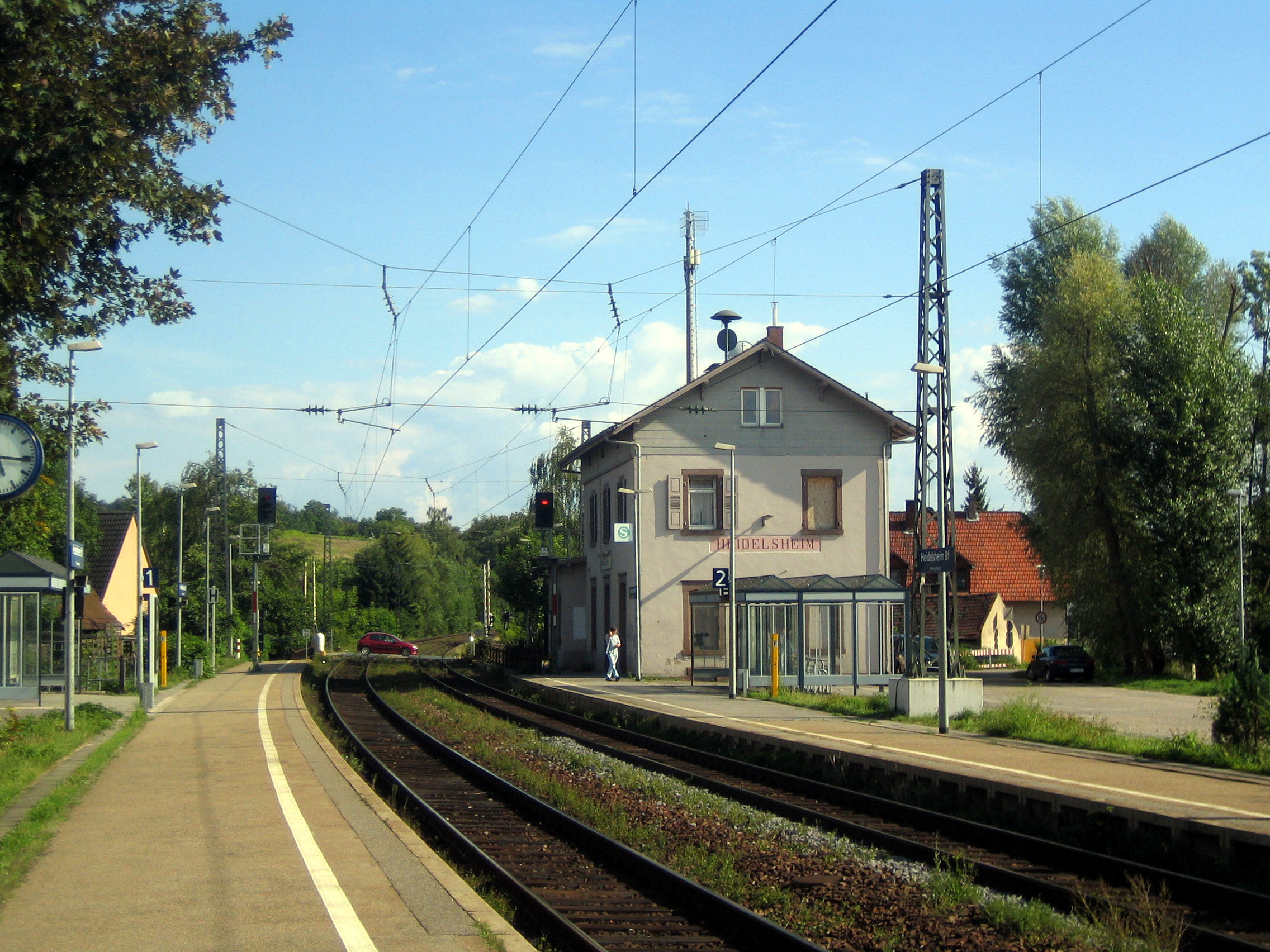
Heidelsheim station

On 1 October 1853 the Western Railway went into service; the inaugural trip had run on 20 September. Under a treaty of 1850, the line was operated for its full length, including in Baden, by the Royal Württemberg State Railways. In Bruchsal, there was initially a Württemberg station for the Western Railway with standard gauge, which was east of the original Baden station. Only after 1854/55 was the Baden station converted to standard gauge and the lines of the two Bruchsal stations were connected. The original line from Durlach to Pforzheim and Mühlacker supported by Baden was put into operation in 1863, with Mühlacker as the border station. In conjunction with the Mühlacker–Bietigheim line, this provided a more direct link between Karlsruhe and Stuttgart, which became an important route for long-distance services.

Under the 1850 treaty, Baden had the right to buy back the line on its territory. This right was invoked in 1873, when the plans for the Kraichgau Railway were developed. This would cross the Western Railway in Bretten, but a connection between the lines was not required. The negotiations for the purchase dragged on until 1878, since Württemberg was reluctant to cede the profitable line and there were differences over the purchase price for the line. With the construction of the Kraichgau railway, the Bretten Station, which had previously been in close proximity to the city centre, was moved to the south-western outskirts. From 15 October 1879, the Baden State Railways took over the assets and operations of the line from Bretten to Bruchsal.

Between 1859 and 1862, only the first section from Bietigheim to Mühlacker was double track. The Bruchsal–Bretten section was duplicated in 1888 by the Baden Railways and the Württemberg Baden Railways completed the duplication between Mühlacker and Bretten in 1890.

The original stations along the line were in Mühlacker, Maulbronn and Bretten, with halts in Großsachsenheim (now Sachsenheim), Sersheim, Illingen, Gondelsheim and Heidelsheim. Later, halts were opened at Ruit, Ölbronn (1891), Ötisheim (1890), Ensingen (1900), Helmsheim (1909) and Metterzimmern (1912). During 1904, the Vaihingen–Enzweihingen line (called the Vaihinger Stadtbahn prior to the suspension of its operations in 2002) opened from Sersheim-Vaihingen station, which was situated some distance from both Vaihingen and Sersheim. In 1906 the station was renamed Vaihingen (Enz) Staatsbahnhof ("state station"). This was renamed Vaihingen (Enz) Reichsbahnhof ("national station") in 1923 and Vaihingen (Enz) Nordbahnhof ("north station") in 1950. In 1905 a halt was built close to Sersheim.

Between 1890 and 1914 Bruchsal station had developed into a hub for rail transport and underwent extensive modifications. The narrow and steep curves (with grades of about 1.0%) between the station and the cemetery tunnel had over time become an obstacle for the heavier trains now running. On 3 December 1898 a wider curve was opened, which included the 424 metre-long Personenzug-Tunnel ("Passenger train tunnel"). Furthermore, between 1903 and 1906 a new freight line was opened. This connected the freight yard, which is on the west side was Bruchsal station, via a bridge over the tracks of the line to Karlsruhe, then through a 780-metre-long Güterzug-Tunnel ("Freight train tunnel") to Ruhstein junction on the Western Railway. This freight bypass was extended on 29 January 1906 by a connection with the Bruhrain Railway to the west for freight, which would otherwise always have had to cross the tracks of the line to Karlsruhe.

The Western Railway, together with the Durlach–Mühlacker line, had not only regional but national and international significance. In 1914, before the start of World War I, there were nine daily long-distance trains operating on the Bruchsal–Mühlacker–Bietigheim section, connecting western Germany and the Netherlands on one hand and Bavaria and Austria on the other. Trains on 13 major train services operated over the Karlsruhe–Mühlacker–Bietigheim line, including the Paris–Vienna service and the Orient Express.

=== 1920–1945: developments under Deutsche Reichsbahn ===
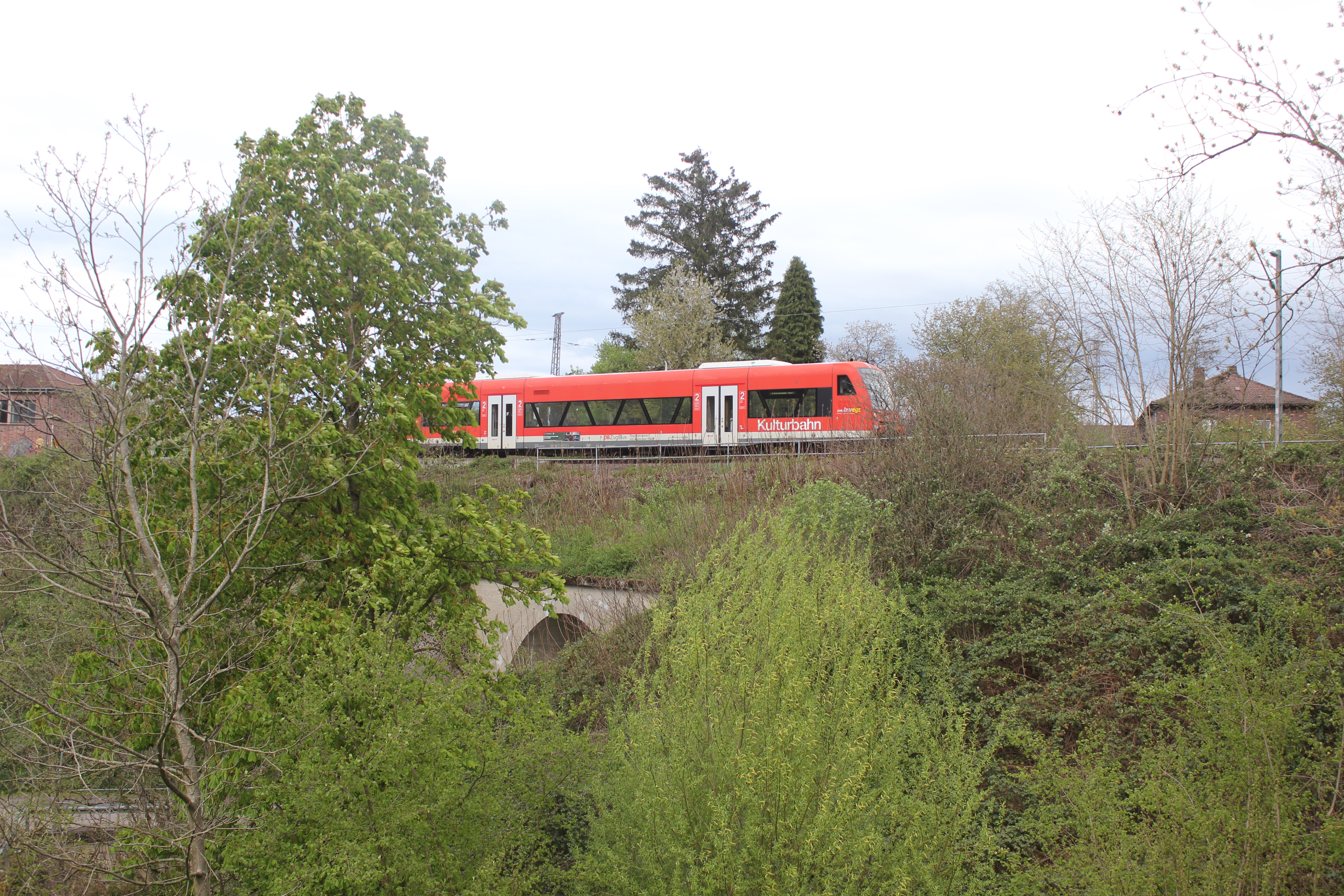
Connecting curve between Bretten and Pforzheim built in 1941, nowadays used by a weekend train line

On 1 April 1920, the Western Railway became part of the newly formed Deutsche Reichsbahn (German Railways). The elimination of national boundaries had a positive impact especially on freight traffic. Therefore, long-distance freight steadily increased, both towards Heidelberg and via Pforzheim to Karlsruhe. In the course of World War II, the line played an important role, particularly in the transportation of coal from the Saar to southern Germany and Austria.

In 1941, a connecting curve was built in Mühlacker between the Western Railway from Bretten and the line to Pforzheim. The railway line remained largely unaffected by the fighting of World War II until the autumn of 1944. After that stations and trains were more and more affected by bombing and strafing, causing many deaths and injuries and great property damage. Parts of the line had to be temporarily closed repeatedly. On 1 March 1945, Bruchsal was the target of a devastating bombing raid that destroyed the railway and damaged the tunnel. The Bietigheim viaduct was bombed several times before 8 April 1945, when German troops blew up several of its piers.

=== Developments 1945–1990 ===
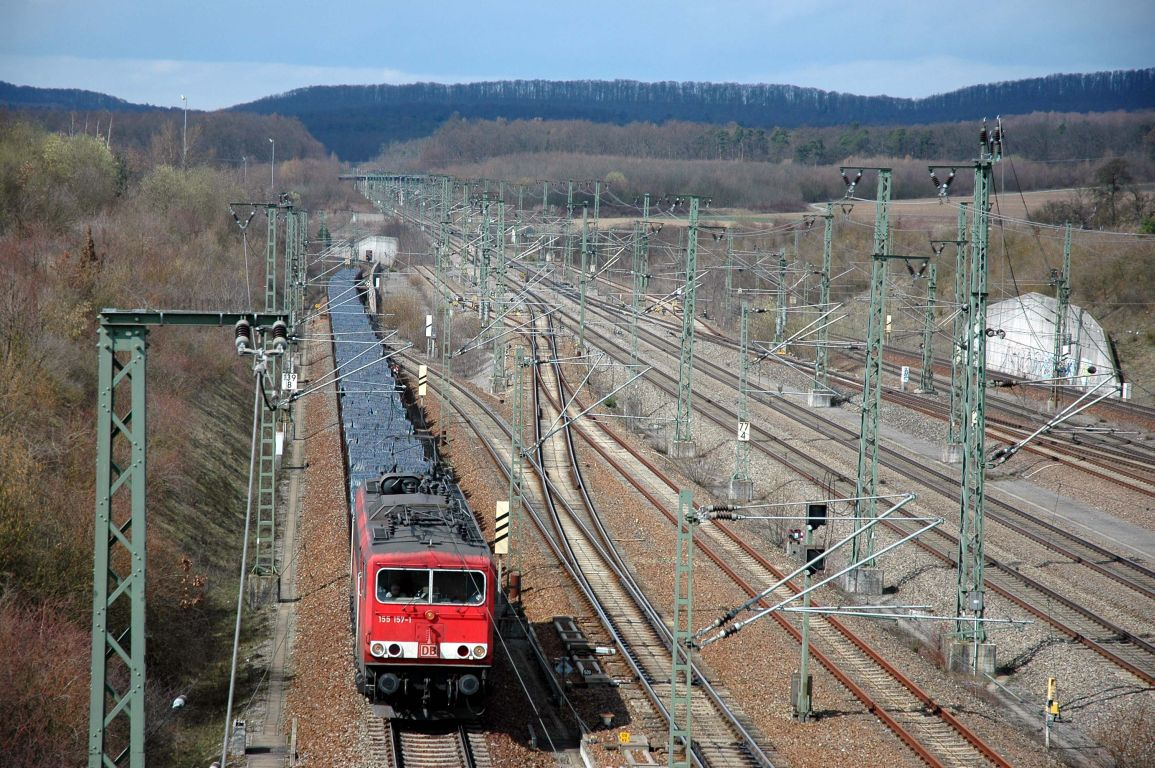
Freight train running to Stuttgart near the entrance of the new Vaihingen (Enz) station; high-speed line on the right

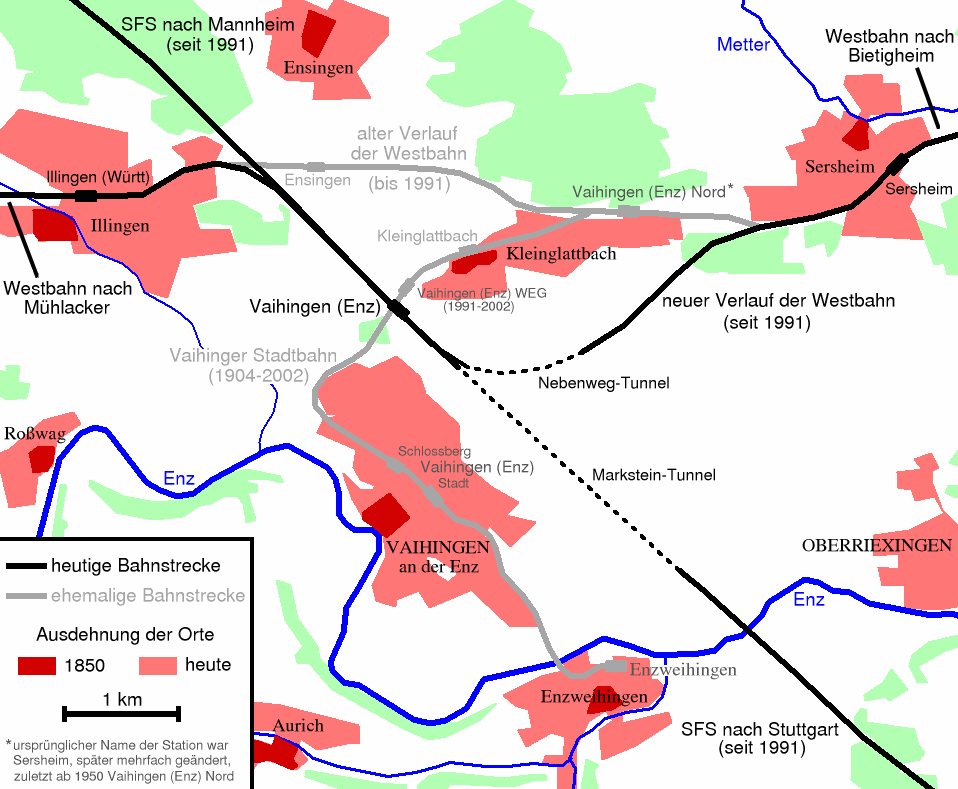
Old and new line near Vaihingen

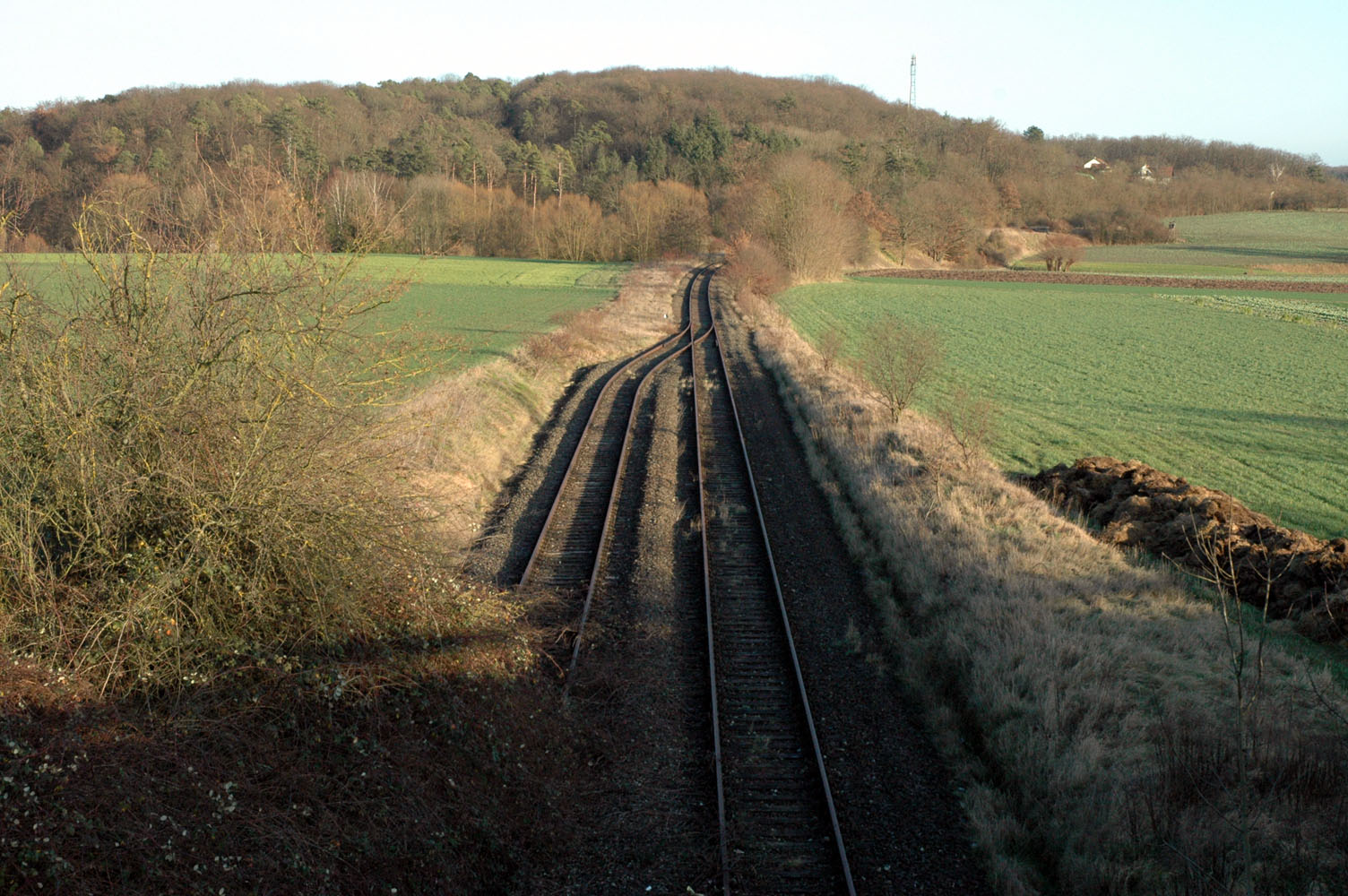
Section of old Western Railway near Vaihingen-Ensingen, now abandoned

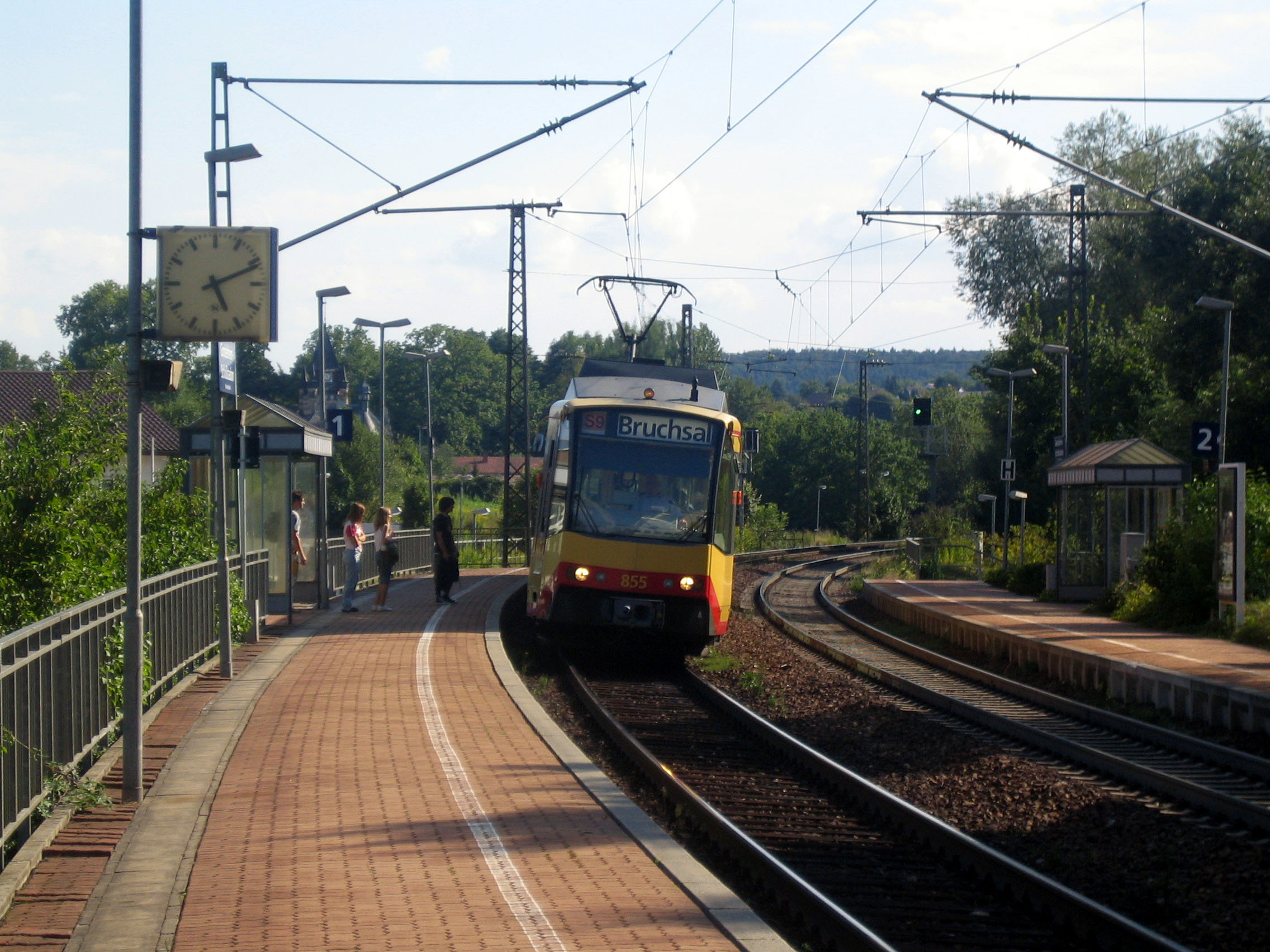
Stadtbahn Karlsruhe Line S9 at new Schloßstadion station in 2006

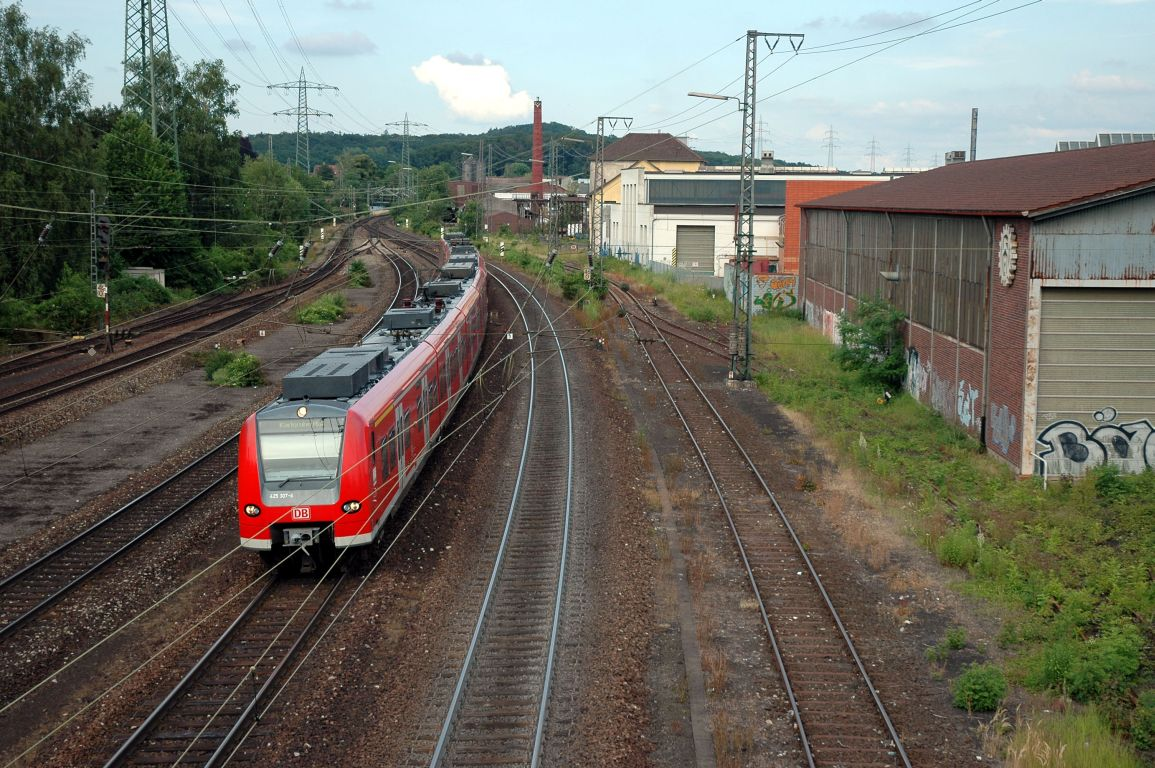
Regional Express arriving at Mühlacker station

As a result of the damage received the Western Railway was closed to traffic at the end of the war. Since the American occupation troops had an interest in the restoration of the railway, this was quickly addressed. After repairs in Bruchsal and the construction of a temporary viaduct in Bietigheim, the line was re-opened to Stuttgart in June 1945. The complete repair of the Bietigheim viaduct continued until 1949.

On 7 October 1951, the Deutsche Bundesbahn (German Federal Railways, DB) completed the electrification of the Mühlacker–Bietigheim section and the Mühlacker–Bruchsal section on 23 May 1954. Between October 1952 and August 1953, the Maulbronn tunnel was replaced by a deep cutting, which was situated 60 m to the west of the tunnel and was 30 m deep, since the tunnel could not be converted at a reasonable cost to allow sufficient room for overhead lines. After the commissioning of the cutting on 12 December 1953, the tunnel was long used as a wine cellar. The electrification of the line allowed the use of bank engines to be abandoned, these had previously been necessary on a section between Bruchsal and Mühlacker.

The reconstruction of the line accelerated long-distance services from Hamburg to Lindau and Munich. With the introduction of the InterCity network in 1971, a two-hour interval service was introduced between Heidelberg and Stuttgart, this was upgraded to a one-hour service in 1979. To reduce congestion on the line the less frequented stations in Metterzimmern, Ensingen, Maulbronn-West and Ölbronn-Ruit were closed.

=== 1991: opening of the Mannheim–Stuttgart high-speed line ===
To relieve congestion on the Western Railway, DB had planned a high-speed line between Mannheim and Stuttgart since the late 1960s. Construction of this line lasted until 1991 and it linked to the Western Railway in Vaihingen. As the existing station of Vaihingen (Enz) Nord was poorly laid out and was distant from the town it served, a new seven kilometre-long section was built to the west of the old line. Instead of taking the previous direct route from Sersheim via Kleinglattbach to Illingen, the new line runs along a south-facing arc and then through the Nebenweg tunnel to reach the newly built Vaihingen (Enz) station, which is close to the town of Vaihingen. There it runs parallel with the high-speed line, which runs northwest–southeast, and separates near Illingen to return to the old route. The new section of the Western Railway was opened on 30 September 1990 and the high-speed line a year later.

DB then transferred almost all the major services that had previously run via Bruchsal and Bietigheim on to the new line. This meant that traffic on the Western Railway fell sharply as it was now used almost exclusively for regional passenger and freight services. Even the Interregio-Express service between Karlsruhe and Stuttgart, introduced in 2001, uses the new line from Vaihingen (Enz). As a result, in October 1993, the second track of the goods relief line was shut down in Bruchsal. The rerouting of the line at Vaihingen reduced traffic on the Vaihinger Stadtbahn, leading to the suspension of its operations in 2002. Freight on the section of line from Vaihingen (Enz) Nord to Sersheim stopped running on 15 August 2003 and the line was closed on 19 November 2004.

=== Karlsruhe Stadtbahn ===
Regional services, which was operated primarily between Bruchsal and Mühlacker, declined in importance. To increase its attractiveness, the Albtal-Verkehrs-Gesellschaft (Alb Valley transport company, AVG), the operator of the Karlsruhe Stadtbahn, extended services over the Western Railway to Bretten in 1992. Due to the great success of this application of this application of the Karlsruhe model, the line was finally incorporated in the Stadtbahn network in 1994, which coincided with a significant revival of passenger traffic on the route.

On 29 May 1994, line S9 services commenced between Bretten and Bruchsal. By 1996, this was followed by the opening of five new stations on this section alone. From 1997, individual services of the S9 ran to Mühlacker; from 30 May 1999, normal S9 services have operated to Mühlacker. Since then, three new stations have been built in this section and the Maulbronn West and Ruit stations have been reactivated. Since the commissioning of the Mannheim–Stuttgart high-speed line, Regional-Express trains have run between Mühlacker and Bietigheim-Bissingen every hour, stopping at all stations.

Also on 30 May 1999, AVG extended line S5, which previously ended in Pforzheim, to Mühlacker, continuing on the Western Railway to Bietigheim-Bissingen, which provided a transfer-free connection to the centre of Karlsruhe. Since then two new stations (Mühlacker Rößlesweg and Ellental) have been established on this section, at which Regional-Express trains stop.

== Operations ==
=== Lines ===
Karlsruhe Stadtbahn S9 services operate between Mühlacker and Bruchsal. S5 services operate between Bietigheim-Bissingen and Mühlacker, continuing to Wörth am Rhein in the Rhineland-Palatinate in the west. Some Enz valley trains (S6) run between Bietigheim-Bissingen and Mühlacker, continuing to Pforzheim on the route used by S5.

The Regional-Express (RE) services on the route between Heidelberg and Stuttgart stop at all stops between Bietigheim and Bissingen and at Mühlacker, but only in Bretten between Mühlacker and Bruchsal.

Between Mühlacker and Bietigheim-Bissingen, RE and Interregio-Express (IRE) trains on the Stuttgart–Karlsruhe route run on the line, as well as InterCity trains between Karlsruhe and Nuremberg. While the RE trains stop almost everywhere, the IRE and IC trains only stop at Mühlacker and Vaihingen (Enz).

=== Rolling stock ===
The Karlsruhe Stadtbahn lines S5 and S9 use two-system vehicles of GT8-100C/2S and GT8-100D/2S-M classes. The RE services on the Karlsruhe–Stuttgart route since 2002 are usually operated by class 425 electric multiple units, but sometimes by locomotive-hauled double-decker trains. Locomotive-hauled double-decker trains have also operated since 2006 as IREs between the Karlsruhe and Stuttgart and on IR services between Stuttgart and Heidelberg.

== See also ==
- Royal Württemberg State Railways
