= Mühlacker station =

Railway station in Germany

Mühlacker
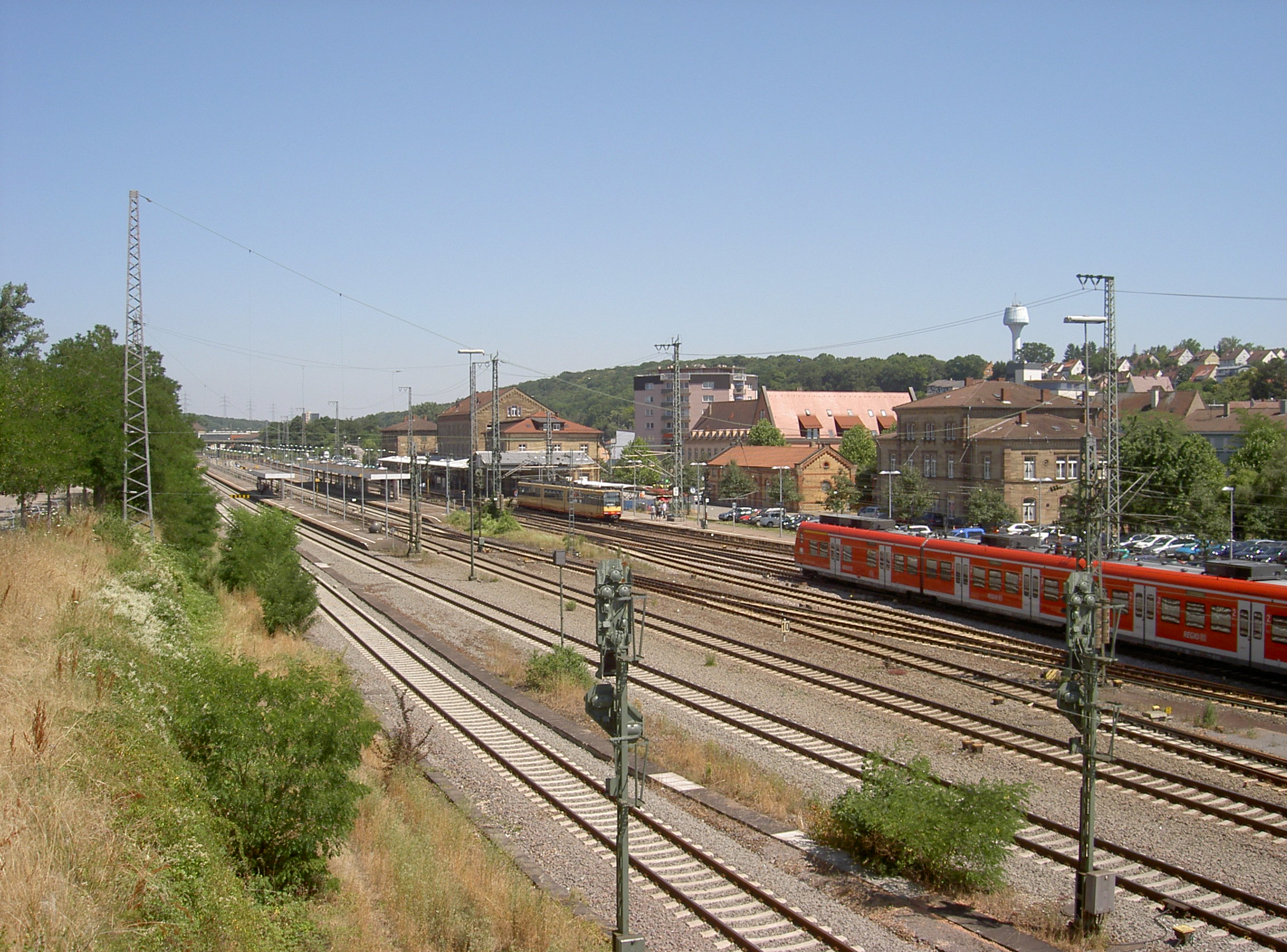

General information
- Location: Mühlacker, Baden-Württemberg; Germany
- Coordinates: 48°57′11″N 8°50′47″E
- Lines: Württemberg Western Railway (KBS 770, KBS 771, KBS 772, KBS 710.5, KBS 710.9); Karlsruhe–Mühlacker railway (KBS 770, KBS 772, KBS 710.5)
- Platforms: 5

Construction
- Accessible: Yes

Other information
- Station code: 4197
- DS100 code: TM
- IBNR: 8000339
- Category: 4
- Fare zone: VPE: 60; KVV: VPE (VPE transitional tariff, season and select daily passes only)
- Website: www.bahnhof.de

History
- Opened: 1 October 1853

Services
Preceding station	DB Fernverkehr	Following station
Pforzheim Hbf towards Karlsruhe Hbf	IC 61	Vaihingen (Enz) towards Nürnberg Hbf or Leipzig Hbf
Preceding station		Following station
Pforzheim Hbf towards Karlsruhe Hbf	RE 1	Vaihingen (Enz) towards Aalen Hbf
Preceding station	(Stuttgart)	Following station
Bretten towards Heidelberg Hbf	RE 17b	Terminus
Enzberg towards Karlsruhe Hbf or Bad Wildbad	MEX 17a	Mühlacker Rößlesweg towards Stuttgart Hbf
Ötisheim towards Bruchsal	RB 17c	Mühlacker Rößlesweg towards Mühlacker
Location

Mühlacker station is in the town of Mühlacker in the German state of Baden-Württemberg. It is at the junction of the Karlsruhe–Mühlacker line and the Western Railway. With its five platform tracks, it is the largest station in Enz district. It is served by InterCity, regional and Karlsruhe Stadtbahn services.

== History ==
In the 1840s the Württemberg government decided to build a rail link to the Rhine Valley Railway to connect to Mannheim and the nearby industry. Baden, however, was more interested in connecting Pforzheim to its rail network. After years of negotiations between the Kingdom of Württemberg and the Grand Duchy of Baden, an agreement was reached on the route of the Western Railway on 4 December 1850.

The line branched from the Northern Railway in Bietigheim, running for 23 km until it reached a point between Weilern Eckenweiher Hof and Mühlacker. A station was built there, which would later be the end of a line from Pforzheim. Both settlements were to the south of the town of Dürrmenz. Experts of both countries criticized the route of the line because it prevented the important town of Vaihingen having a well-located station. Baden criticized the location of an important frontier station at a secluded farmhouse. On 1 October 1853 the Royal Württemberg State Railways (Königlich Württembergischen Staats-Eisenbahnen, KWSt.E.) opened the Western Railway. Unusually for Germany, the new station was named after the locality of Mühlacker, not after the community that it was part of.

As a result of the industrialisation stimulated by the railway, the population of Mühlacker increased so that by 1900 it was larger than Dürrmenz and, in due course, Dürrmenz was renamed Dürrmenz-Mühlacker. From 1859 to 1862, the Western Railway between Bietigheim and Mühlacker was duplicated. From the southwest the Grand Duchy of Baden State Railway (Großherzoglich Badische Staatseisenbahnen, BadStB) opened its line from Durlach on 1 June 1863. It replaced a horse-drawn bus between Pforzheim and Mühlacker, which was established in October 1853. By 1869 the BadStB had installed a second track on its line.

The new border station consisted of the Württemberg through station and the Baden terminal station. Now Mühlacker had two stations operated by two national railways with their own officials and operating methods. One problem was the design of timetables, as the Württemberg station used Stuttgart time and the Baden station used Karlsruhe time. This meant that up to the introduction of the single railway time on 1 April 1893 there was a time difference of three minutes.

In the 1880s, the station won important long-distance traffic. On 5 June 1883 the Orient Express ran for the first time on the line from Paris Gare de l'Est to Giurgiu (now in Romania). In order to save time train did not stop in Mühlacker from 1901. Duplication of the Mühlacker-Bretten line was completed in 1890. The continuation of the Zabergäu Railway, which at that time ended in Güglingen, was proposed in 1897. The new line would run via Sternenfels, Diefenbach, Freudenstein, Maulbronn, Schmie and Lienzingen to Mühlacker. The project was rejected the KWSt.E. In 1913, a plan was submitted for a line called the Platten Railway (Plattenbahn) from Renningen via Friolzheim to Mühlacker, but it was not supported by the Royal Württemberg State Railways and by 1920 it was no longer being considered.

On 1 April 1920 KWSt.E. and BadStB were integrated in Deutsche Reichsbahn. This marked the end of the station as a border between different rail systems. In 1921, the boundary posts between the two former zones of the railway station were removed. On 11 November 1930, the town of Dürrmenz-Mühlacker was renamed as Mühlacker at the request of the town council.

In 1941 a new connecting curve was built at the west of the station between the Karlsruhe–Mühlacker line and the Western Railway towards Bruchsal. This allowed trains running from Pforzheim towards Bruchsal to avoid reversing in Mühlacker station and therefore had a strategic advantage for moving troop transports faster towards France. From October 1944, bombing and strafing attacks began on the railways and the trains in the vicinity. Altogether 14 people lost their lives. Tracks and buildings were partially damaged.

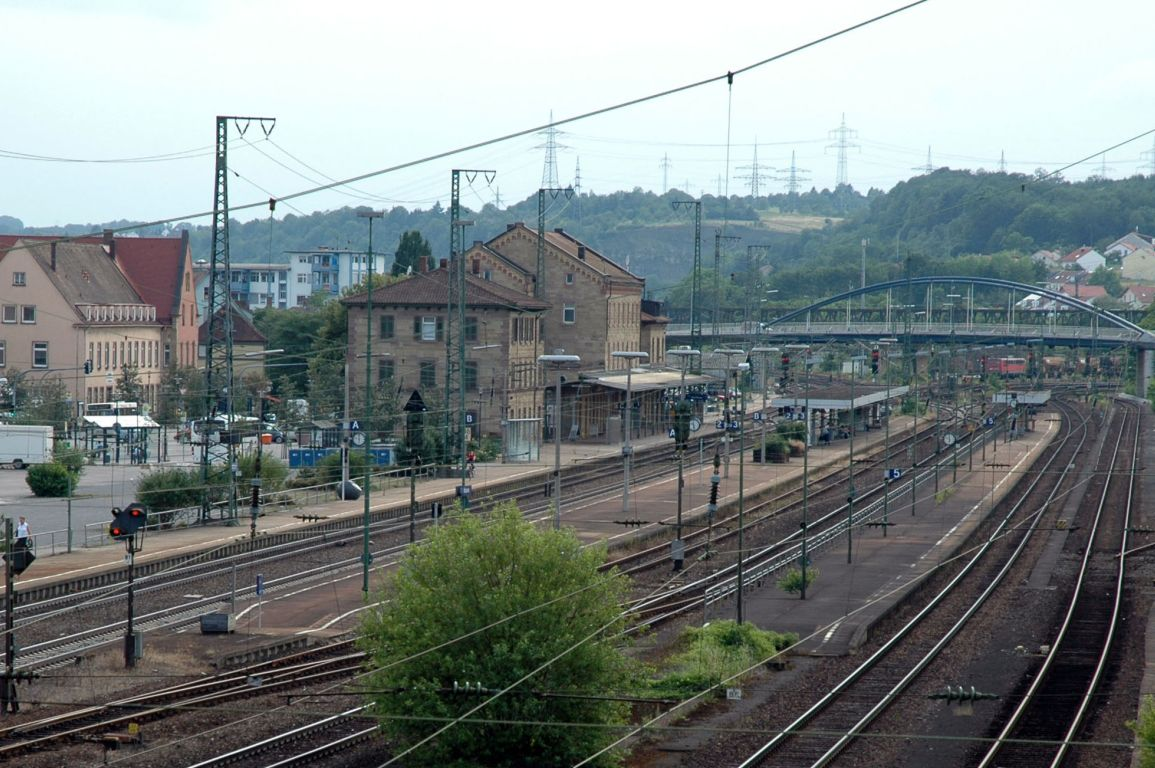
Tracks in Mühlacker, seen from the northeast (2006)

During the reconstruction Deutsche Bundesbahn, electrified the Bietigheim–Mühlacker line. On 6 October 1951 the first electric train ran from Stuttgart. Electric operations were extended on 23 May 1954 to Bretten and on 1 June 1958 to Karlsruhe. In the 1960s plans were developed for a Mannheim–Stuttgart high-speed line. It was eventually decided to build a station on the line at Vaihingen, not Mühlacker. The commissioning of the new line on 2 June 1991 meant that only a few express trains continued to run through Mühlacker.

From 1997 some Karlsruhe Stadtbahn services on line S 9 ran from Bretten to Mühlacker and on 30 May 1999 all S 9 trains ran to and terminated in Mühlacker. The former border station resumed its old role as a nodal point with dense regular interval operations and long-distance connections.

== Reception Building ==
The two historical station buildings in Mühlacker have survived. They are the Württemberg station building on platform track 1 and the Baden railway station building on platform track 50.

The Württemberg station building was originally a two-story building with a pitched roof. A striking feature of the Western Railway stations was their entrances, which were highlighted with alternating red and yellow sandstone. In 1885 the KWSt.E. added one floor to the building and added an extension on the eastern side. The single-storey extension provided working space for the post office.

In 1863 the BadStB established its entrance building at the former station garden. The building has a three-story centre section with a hipped roof. It is bordered on the right and left by two two-story buildings.

== Railway operations ==
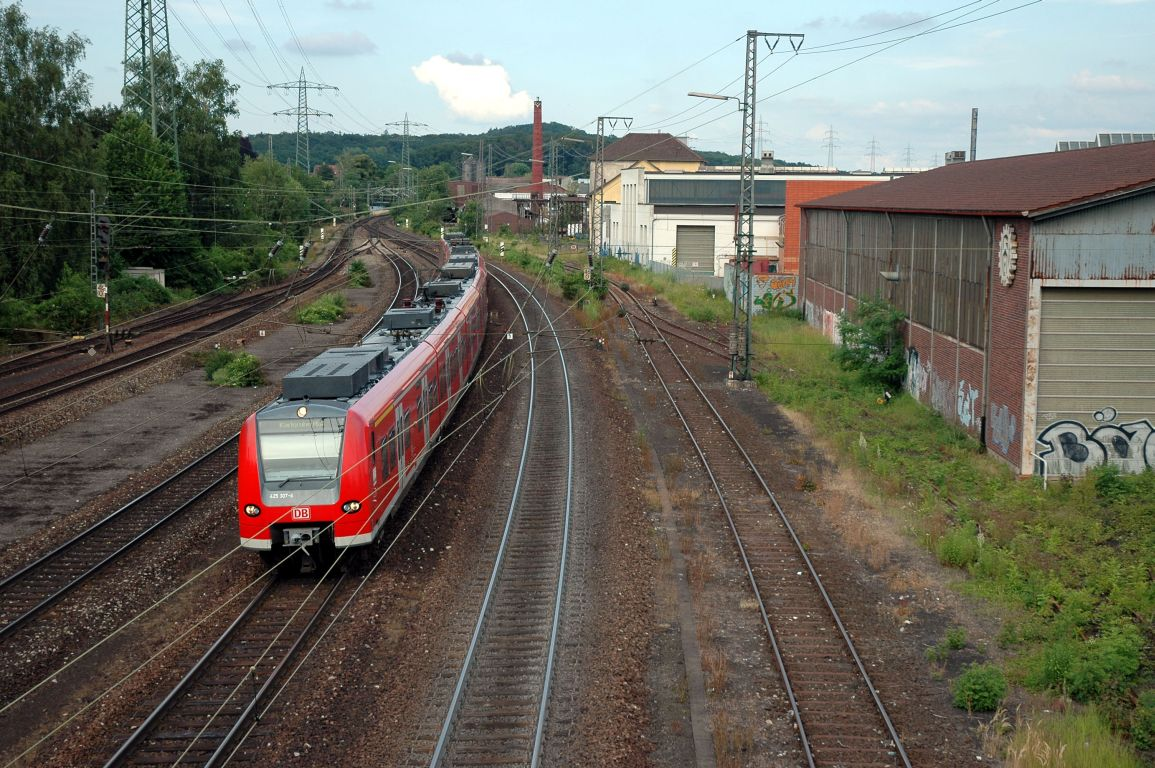
Regional Express from Stuttgart at the entrance of Mühlacker station (2006)

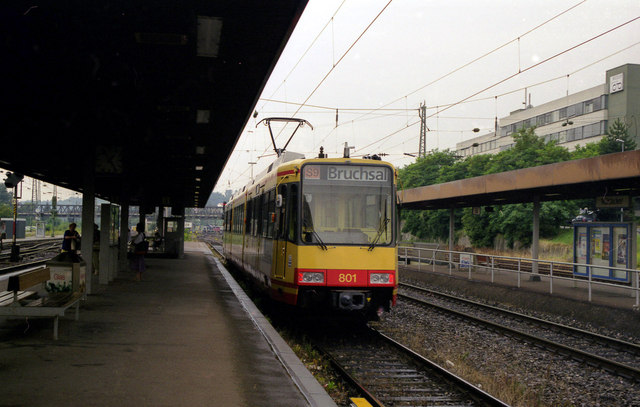
Karlsruhe Stadtbahn train in Bruchsal (1999)

The station is a railway junction where the Karlsruhe–Mühlacker line meets the Württemberg Western Railway. Platform track 1 serves trains towards Vaihingen (Enz), while track 2 serves trains toward Pforzheim. On track 3 Karlsruhe Stadtbahn trains start on the line to Bretten. Track 4 is only used by non-stopping trains and this side of the platform is blocked by a railing. Regional trains to Bretten stop on track 5. Track 6 is a passing loop with no platform for trains to Bretten. Track 50 is the last track of the Baden Railway's former terminal station, which once had four tracks. At the eastern end of the platform there is a connection to track 1. Stadtbahn trains to Pforzheim start on track 50.

Mühlacker station is classified by Deutsche Bahn as a category 4 station.

The signal box in Mühlacker has an interlocking of class SpDrL30.

=== Long distance services ===
Route		Frequency
IC 61	Karlsruhe – Pforzheim – Mühlacker – Stuttgart – Aalen – Nuremberg – Bamberg – Saalfeld – Jena Paradies – Leipzig	120 minutes

=== Regional services ===
Line	Route	Interval
RE 1	Karlsruhe – Pforzheim – Mühlacker – Vaihingen – Stuttgart (– Schorndorf – Aalen)	Hourly, every two hours to Aalen
MEX 17a	(Stuttgart – Ludwigsburg –) Bietigheim – Vaihingen – Mühlacker – Pforzheim (– Karlsruhe / Bad Wildbad)	Half hourly to Bietigheim, hourly to Stuttgart.
RE 17b	Stuttgart – Ludwigsburg – Bietigheim – Vaihingen – Mühlacker – Bretten – Bruchsal	Every two hours
RB 17c	Stuttgart – Ludwigsburg – Bietigheim – Vaihingen – Mühlacker – Bretten – Heidelsheim – Bruchsal	Every half hour with additional peak services

=== Stadtbahn ===
Line	Route
S 5	(Wörth –) Karlsruhe-Knielingen – Karlsruhe Entenfang – Karlsruhe-Durlach – Pforzheim – Mühlacker – Vaihingen (Enz) – Bietigheim (at 60 minute intervals)
S 9	Bruchsal – Bretten – Mühlacker (at 60 minute intervals)
