= Vaihinger =

Vaihinger is a surname. Notable people with the surname include:

- Hans Vaihinger (1852–1933), German philosopher
- Jörg Vaihinger (born 1962), German sprinter

== See also ==
- Vaihingen (disambiguation)
