= Bietigheim-Bissingen station =

Railway station in Bietigheim-Bissingen, Germany

Bietigheim-Bissingen
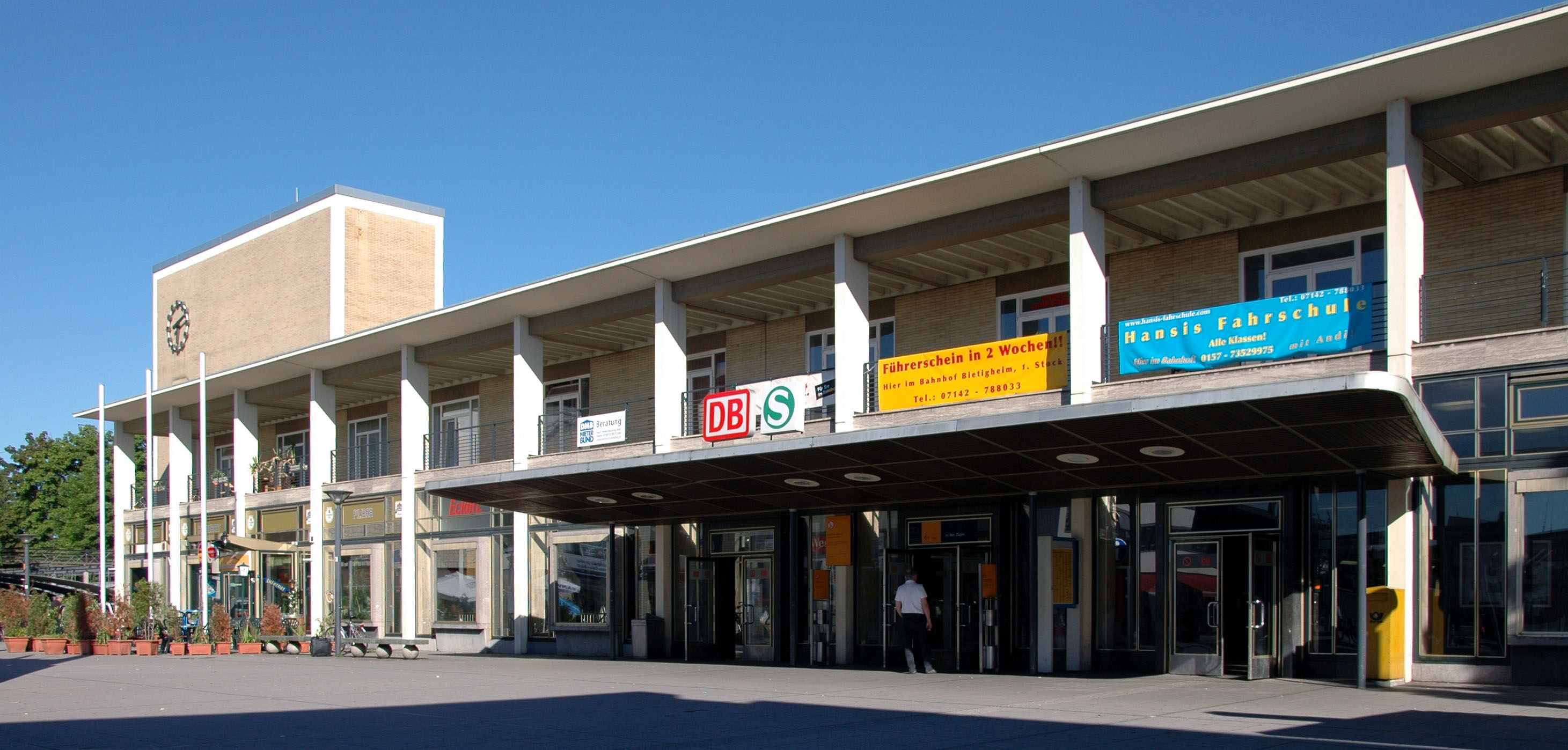

General information
- Location: Bietigheim-Bissingen, Baden-Württemberg; Germany
- Coordinates: 48°56′50″N 9°8′9″E
- Lines: Franconia Railway (KBS 780, 790.5); Württemberg Western Railway (KBS 770, 710.5); Backnang–Bietigheim line (dismantled)
- Platforms: 8

Construction
- Accessible: Yes
- Architect: Michael Knoll (1847); Helmuth Conradi (1961)

Other information
- Station code: 636
- DS100 code: TBM
- IBNR: 8000038
- Category: 2
- Fare zone: : 3
- Website: www.bahnhof.de

History
- Opened: 11 October 1847

Services
Preceding station		Following station
Ludwigsburg towards Stuttgart Hbf	RE 8	Heilbronn Hbf towards Würzburg Hbf
Preceding station	(Stuttgart)	Following station
Ludwigsburg towards Tübingen Hbf	MEX 12	Besigheim towards Mosbach-Neckarelz
Bietigheim-Bissingen Ellental towards Karlsruhe Hbf or Bad Wildbad	MEX 17a	Ludwigsburg towards Stuttgart Hbf
Bietigheim-Bissingen Ellental towards Bruchsal	MEX 17c	Ludwigsburg towards Stuttgart Hbf
Ludwigsburg towards Tübingen Hbf	MEX 18	Besigheim towards Osterburken
Preceding station	Stuttgart S-Bahn	Following station
Tamm towards Schwabstraße	S5	Terminus
Location

Bietigheim-Bissingen station is a junction station in the town of Bietigheim-Bissingen in the German state of Baden-Württemberg where the Württemberg Western Railway separates from the Franconia Railway. With its eight station tracks it is the largest station in the district of Ludwigsburg. It is also served by line S 5 of the Stuttgart S-Bahn.

== History ==
Bietigheim station was opened on 11 October 1847 along with the Ludwigsburg–Bietigheim section of the Northern Railway, connecting Stuttgart with Heilbronn. The station was about two km outside the town in the forest of Laiernwald. The Royal Württemberg State Railways had rejected all efforts by the town council to have the station built closer to the town. In addition to the station building, there were initially a building for other offices, a goods shed and a locomotive depot. On 25 July 1848 the remainder of the Northern Railway between Bietigheim and Heilbronn was opened.

According to Charles Vignoles’ proposals of 1843/44 the Western Railway to Bruchsal would have separated from the Northern Railway near Tamm. Karl Etzel proposed in 1845 the more northerly branch in Bietigheim, since the Enz valley was at its narrowest there and therefore a shorter and lower bridge was required than under the original plan. Under Vignoles' plan from a 46 m high and 515 m long viaduct would have been required at Bissinger Sägmühle; under Etzel's plan the viaduct would be only 26 m high and 287 m long. Despite its longer route, Etzel's alignment saved 400,000 gulden. In February 1846 the Württemberg Treasury agreed to the construction of the Bietigheim Enz Valley Viaduct.

At the time Etzel was courting the daughter of Württemberg Finance Minister, Karl von Gärttner, who came from Bietigheim, and they were married in 1847. This gave rise to speculation that Etzel's father-in-law favoured a junction that was close to his home.

In 1852 the Northern Railway track from Stuttgart to Bietigheim was duplicated. The second track was built on the left side of the station building, meaning that it now became an island between the tracks. The new line was opened on 1 October 1853. On 8 December 1879 the first trains ran on the Backnang–Bietigheim line. The connection to Backnang allowed freight trains to run between Backnang and Mühlacker or Heilbronn. At that time Bietigheim station was the second largest station in Württemberg.

In 1887, the first factories were established near the station. Residential and commercial buildings were also built nearby.

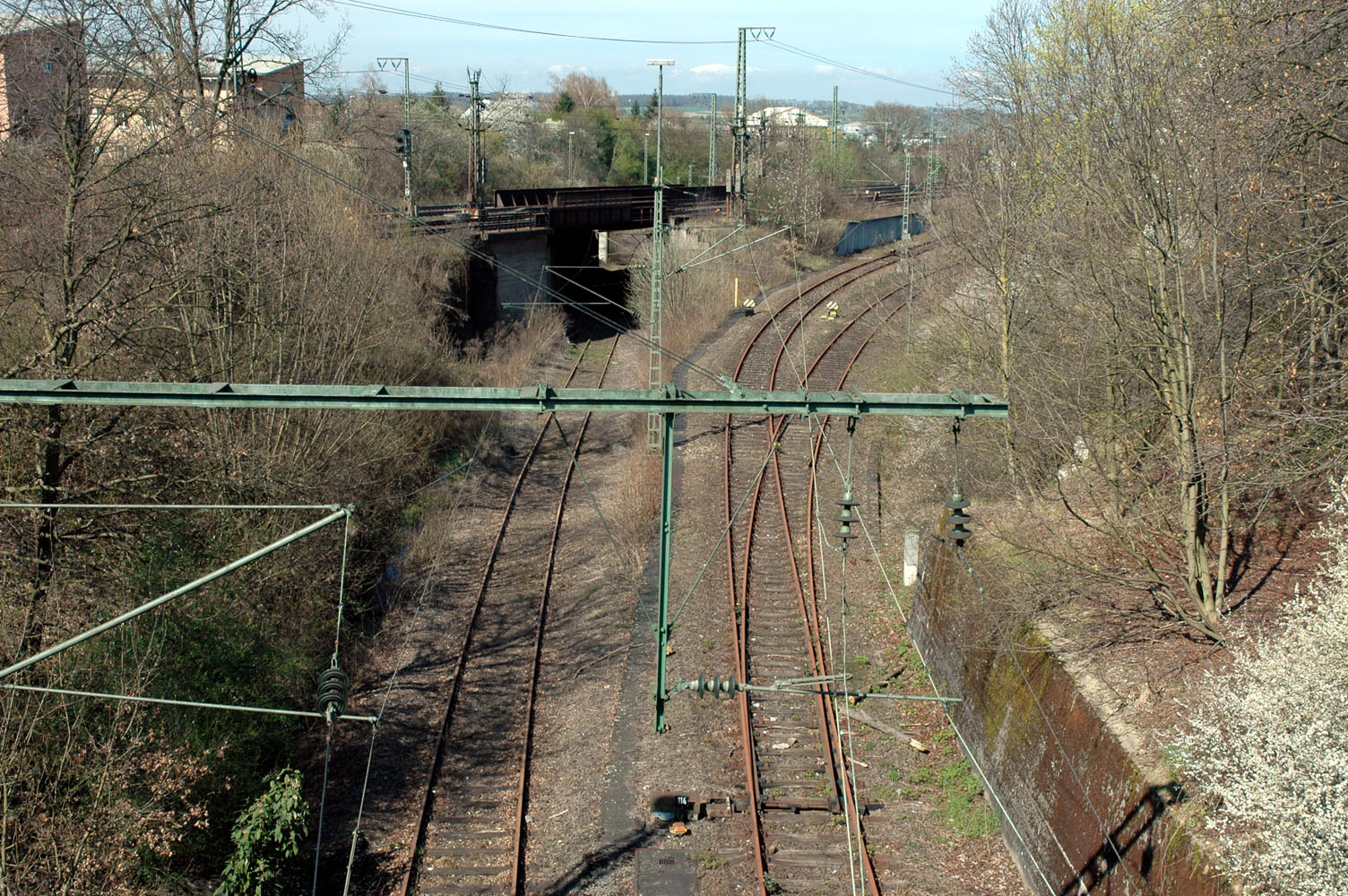
Remains of the electrified line from Backnang with crossing under the main line (April 2007)

In 1940 a third track was built on the Northern Railway between Ludwigsburg and Bietigheim. Although a fourth track was then planned, it was not built for 41 years. Several air raids during the Second World War inflicted severe damage to the rail infrastructure. The railway line to Backnang was not rebuilt and the section between Bietigheim and Beihingen-Heutingsheim (now Freiberg am Neckar) was closed. Part of it is still used as a siding. A makeshift station was rebuilt. Stuttgart suburban trains were extended to Bietigheim with the electrification of the Ludwigsburg-Bietigheim section in October 1950.

In 1975, the town of Bietigheim and the community of Bissingen an der Enz were merged to form the town of Bietigheim-Bissingen. As a result, the station was similarly renamed. In 1981 it became a terminal station of the Stuttgart S-Bahn.

== Reception building ==
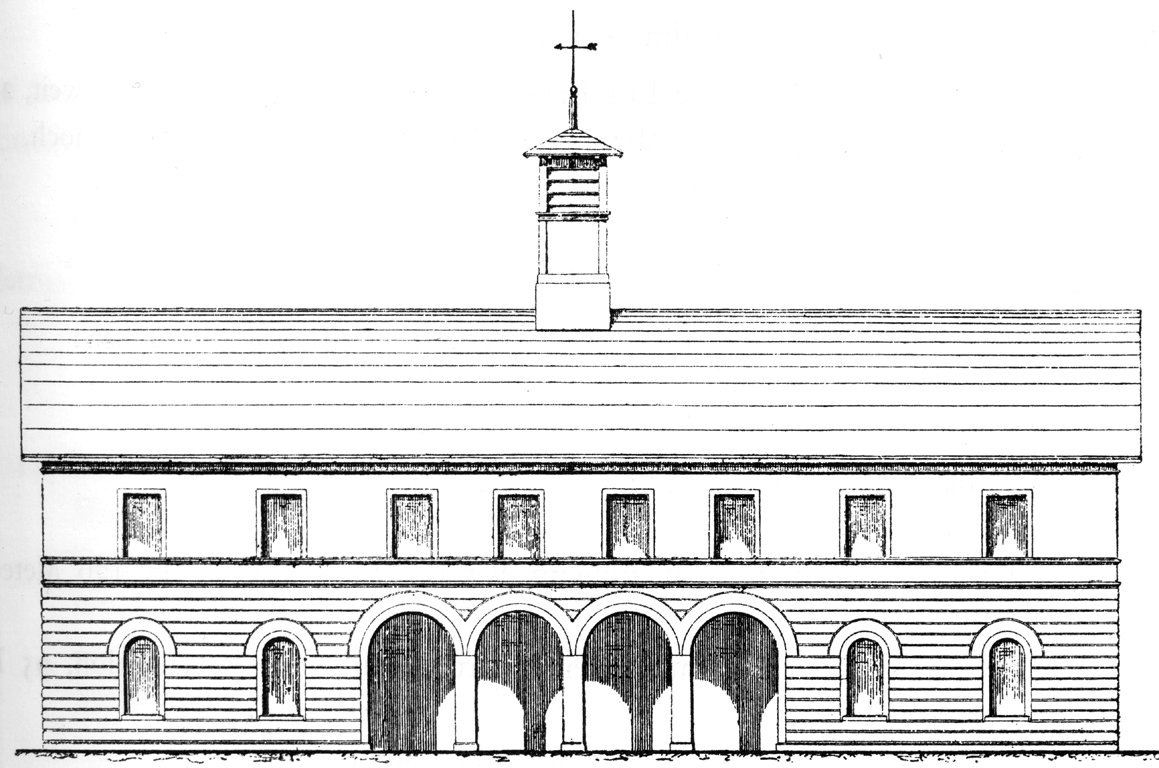
Original entrance building of 1847

The first station building of the Rundbogenstil ("round arch style"), which was common at the time, was probably designed by Michael Knoll. It had two stories and a tower with a clock and two bells. The eight vault construction was probably built of stone. On the 1st floor there was a cornice at the height of the window sills. It had a continuous gable roof and a clear horizontal division between the ground and first floor. In the centre there was a four vault central hall, accented by the bell tower. The station building of 1847 had on the ground floor two waiting rooms, an office for the stationmaster, a cash room, a luggage room and a staff room. On the 1st floor there were apartments for rail personnel.

In 1887, the station was expanded with an additional administration building. It stood next to the first station building and had a waiting room and a restaurant.

In 1958, construction began on the new reception building and it was inaugurated on 27 June 1961. Helmuth Conradi, who also designed the new Heidelberg Hauptbahnhof, planned it as a two-story building with a one-story annex. The station's roof extends to the right and left of the lobby and connected to a four-story tower with a clock, which appears to be part of the same building. The windows of the entrance building emphasise its concrete skeleton. In the tower and on the upper floor there are offices. The previous buildings still remained at first and were later demolished.

== Rail operations ==
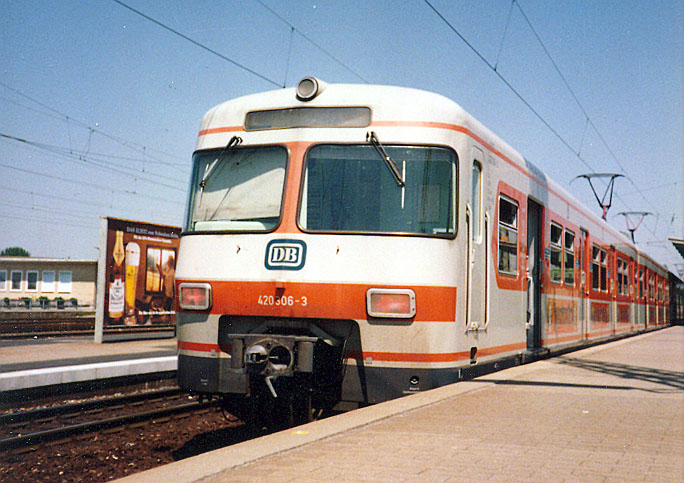
Stuttgart S-Bahn class 420 electric multiple unit in platform 5 in Bietigheim-Bissingen (c. 1989)

Bietigheim-Bissingen station is a railway junction. It is classified by Deutsche Bahn as a category 2 station. The Württemberg Western Railway separates here from the Franconia Railway. Tracks 1 and 2 are used for freight and have no platform. Karlsruhe Stadtbahn services start on platform track 3, running towards Vaihingen (Enz). Track 4 is used by regional services from Vaihingen (Enz) running towards Ludwigsburg. Stuttgart S-Bahn services towards Ludwigsburg start on track 5. S-Bahn trains terminate on track 6, before they are parked in the rear track field. Regional trains stop at track 7 running towards Vaihingen (Enz). Track 8 is used by regional trains coming from Heilbronn and bound for Ludwigsburg. Tracks 9 and 10 serve regional trains to Heilbronn.

Many tracks are available for the storage and manoeuvring of freight trains.

Bietigheim-Bissinger station has an interlocking of class DRs60.

=== Regional services ===
Line		Frequency
RE 1	Stuttgart – Ludwigsburg – Bietigheim – Vaihingen – Mühlacker – Pforzheim – Karlsruhe-Durlach – Karlsruhe	2 train pairs
RE 8	Stuttgart – Ludwigsburg – Bietigheim – Heilbronn – Bad Friedrichshall – Osterburken – Lauda – Würzburg	Every 2 hours
RE 10a	Tübingen – Reutlingen – Stuttgart – Ludwigsburg – Bietigheim – Vaihingen – Mühlacker – Bretten – Bruchsal – Heidelberg	1 train pair
MEX 12	Tübingen – Reutlingen – Plochingen – Esslingen – Stuttgart – Ludwigsburg – Bietigheim – Heilbronn – Bad Friedrichshall (– Mosbach-Neckarelz)	Hourly (every 30 mins between Stuttgart and Heilbronn)
MEX 17a	Stuttgart – Ludwigsburg – Bietigheim – Vaihingen – Mühlacker – Pforzheim (– Karlsruhe / Bad Wildbad)	Hourly, every 30 mins between Pforzheim and Bietigheim, extended to Stuttgart for the peak
MEX 17c	Stuttgart – Ludwigsburg – Bietigheim – Vaihingen (Enz) – Mühlacker – Bretten – Bruchsal	Hourly
MEX 18	Tübingen – Reutlingen – Plochingen – Esslingen – Stuttgart – Ludwigsburg – Bietigheim – Heilbronn – Neckarsulm – Bad Friedrichshall – Möckmühl – Osterburken	Hourly

=== S-Bahn ===
Line	Route
S 5	Bietigheim – Ludwigsburg – Zuffenhausen – Stuttgart Hauptbahnhof – Schwabstraße
