= Vaihingen =

Vaihingen may refer to:

- Vaihingen (Stuttgart), a city district of Stuttgart
- Vaihingen an der Enz, a town in the district of Ludwigsburg in Baden-Württemberg

== See also ==
- Vaihinger
