= Vaihingen (Enz) station =

Railway station in Germany

Vaihingen (Enz)
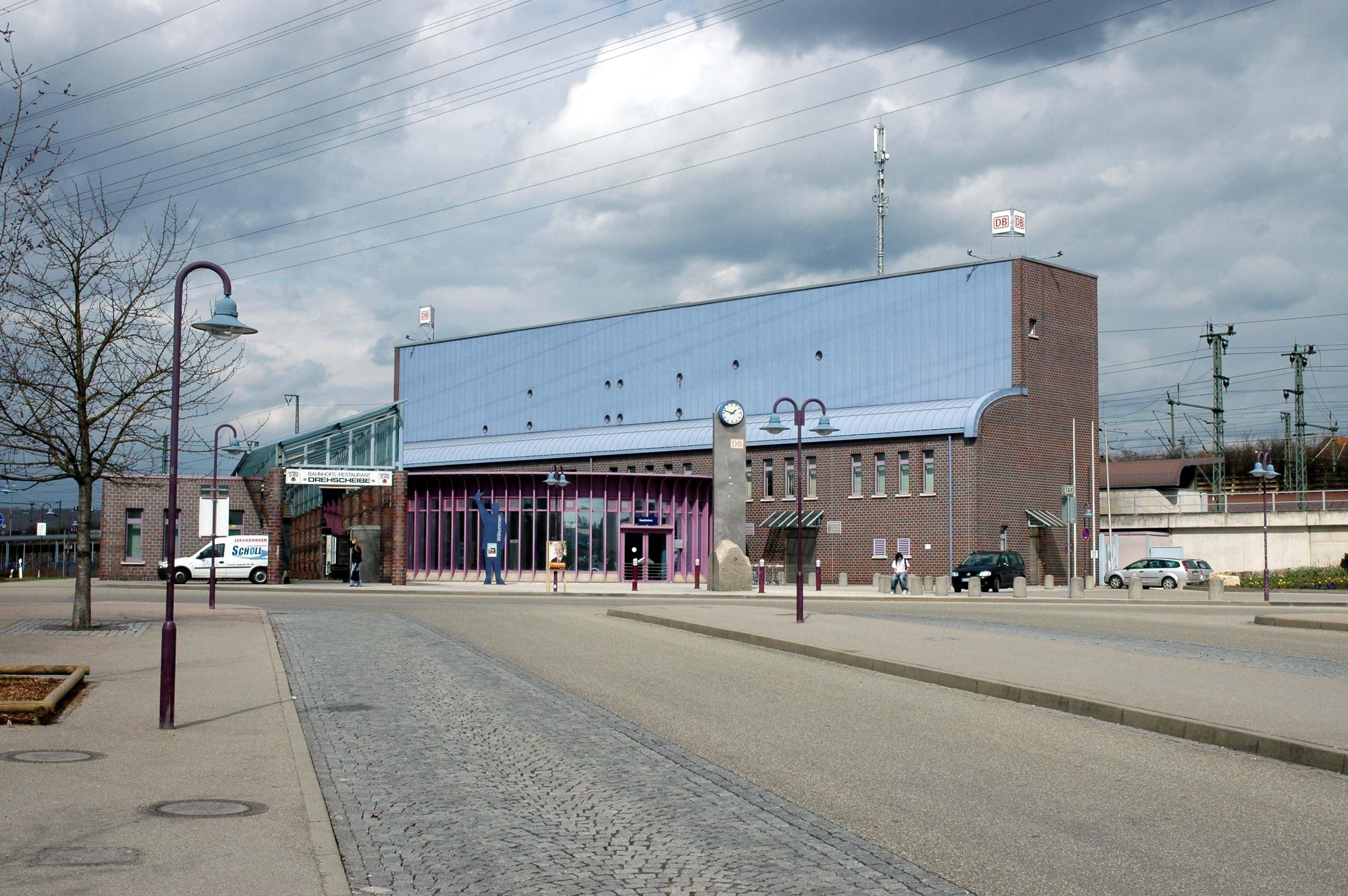
- Station and forecourt

General information
- Location: Vaihingen an der Enz, Baden-Württemberg; Germany
- Coordinates: 48°56′49″N 8°57′30″E
- Owner: Deutsche Bahn
- Operator: DB Netz; DB Station&Service
- Lines: Mannheim–Stuttgart high-speed railway; Württemberg Western Railway (KBS 770, 710.5)
- Platforms: 4

Construction
- Accessible: Yes

Other information
- Station code: 6390
- DS100 code: TV
- IBNR: 8006053
- Category: 4
- Fare zone: : 4 and 5; VPE: 75 (VVS transitional tariff); KVV: VPE (VPE transitional tariff, season and select daily passes only)
- Website: www.bahnhof.de

History
- Opened: 30 September 1990
Services
Preceding station	DB Fernverkehr	Following station
Wiesloch-Walldorf One-way operation	ICE 13	Stuttgart Hbf Terminus
Heidelberg Hbf One-way operation	ICE 15	Stuttgart Hbf Terminus
Heidelberg Hbf towards Hamburg Hbf or Kiel Hbf	ICE 22	Stuttgart Hbf One-way operation
Heidelberg Hbf towards Köln Hbf	ICE 45	Stuttgart Hbf Terminus
Heidelberg Hbf towards Dresden Hbf	IC 55	Stuttgart Hbf Terminus
Heidelberg Hbf towards Dortmund Hbf	IC 55 Allgäu	Stuttgart Hbf towards Oberstdorf
Mühlacker towards Karlsruhe Hbf	IC 61	Stuttgart Hbf towards Nürnberg Hbf or Leipzig Hbf
Mannheim Hbf towards Münster Hbf	ICE 62	Stuttgart Hbf towards Graz Hbf
Preceding station	(Stuttgart)	Following station
Illingen (Württ) towards Heidelberg Hbf	RE 17b	Sersheim towards Stuttgart Hbf
Illingen (Württ) towards Karlsruhe Hbf or Bad Wildbad	MEX 17a	Sersheim towards Stuttgart Hbf
Illingen (Württ) towards Bruchsal	RB 17c	Sersheim towards Mühlacker
Preceding station		Following station
Mühlacker towards Karlsruhe Hbf	RE 1	Stuttgart Hbf towards Aalen Hbf
Location

Vaihingen (Enz) station is a long-distance and the regional station at an important railway junction in the town of Vaihingen an der Enz in the German state of Baden-Württemberg. It is classified by Deutsche Bahn as a category 3 station.

It is one of a few passenger stations in German that are designed to allow Intercity-Express (ICE) trains to pass at 250 km/h. The ICE through tracks do not have platforms.

== Location ==
The station is located about 2.5 kilometers from the centre of Vaihingen, between the town and the suburb of Kleinglattbach at about 250 metres above sea level.

The station lies on the Mannheim–Stuttgart high-speed line (near the 78 km mark from Mannheim) and on the Württemberg Western Railway.

== Structure ==
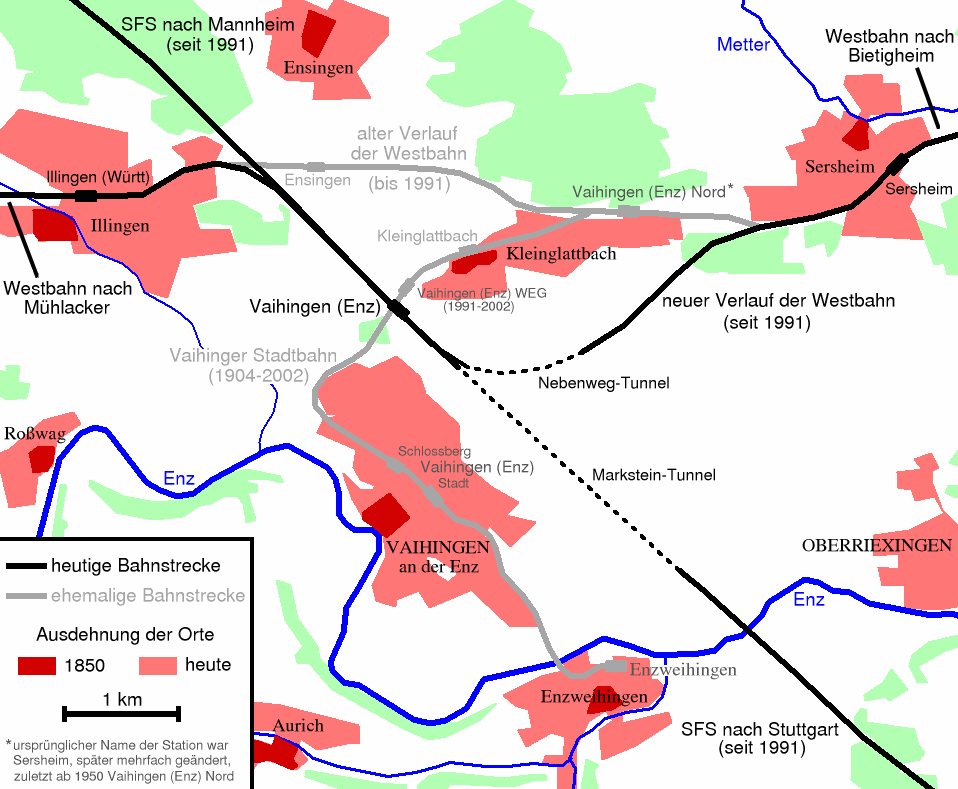
Location of the station

The railway system consists of eight tracks, which are numbered in ascending order in a northeasterly direction. In the middle of these tracks are the two tracks of the high-speed line for trains running at up to 250 km/h (track 4 and 5). Close by on both sides are two passing tracks (3 and 6). In the northeast is a platform for stopping passenger trains (tracks 7 and 8) and another platform to the south (tracks 1 and 2).

Trains to and from the new line can only stop at the platforms on tracks 2 and 7. Tracks 1 and 8 are used by regional trains running from Mühlacker to Bietigheim-Bissingen (track 1) or Bietigheim to Mühlacker (track 8). Fully grade-separated tracks prevent conflicts between high-speed and regional trains. To the east of the station the high-speed tracks run through the 2.8 km-long Markstein Tunnel and the track running towards Bietigheim crosses over the top of the tunnel, running to the north-east. Both regional tracks then run through the Nebenweg Tunnel. To the northwest of the station the regional track running towards Mühlacker passes under the high-speed tracks. At both ends of the station complex there are crossovers between the regional and high-speed tracks.

Travellers reach the platforms via two north-south subways. Outside the building there are ten to twelve bus spaces, some taxi spaces and more than 300 car parking spaces.

The (now inactive) seven km long Vaihingen Stadtbahn line passed under the site of the station. The new station includes a station on the Stadtbahn. Operations on the line were abandoned at the end of 2002.

== Transport links ==
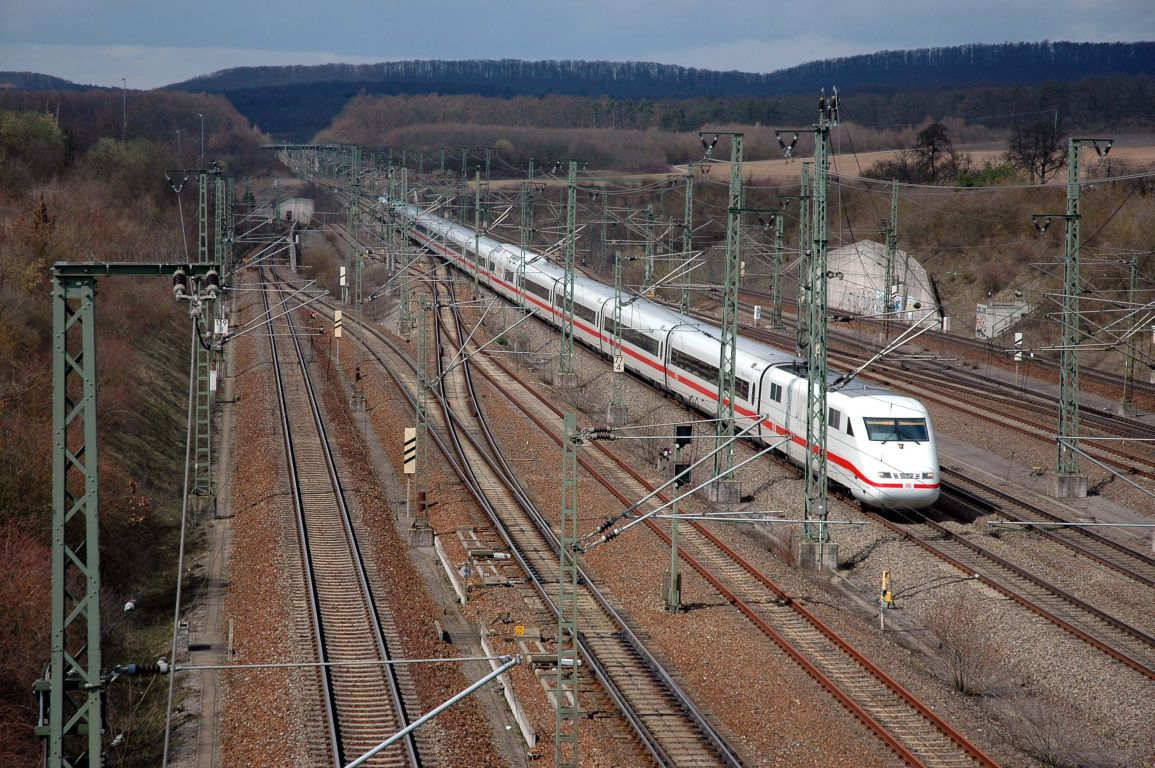
An ICE Stuttgart passes through the station without stopping.

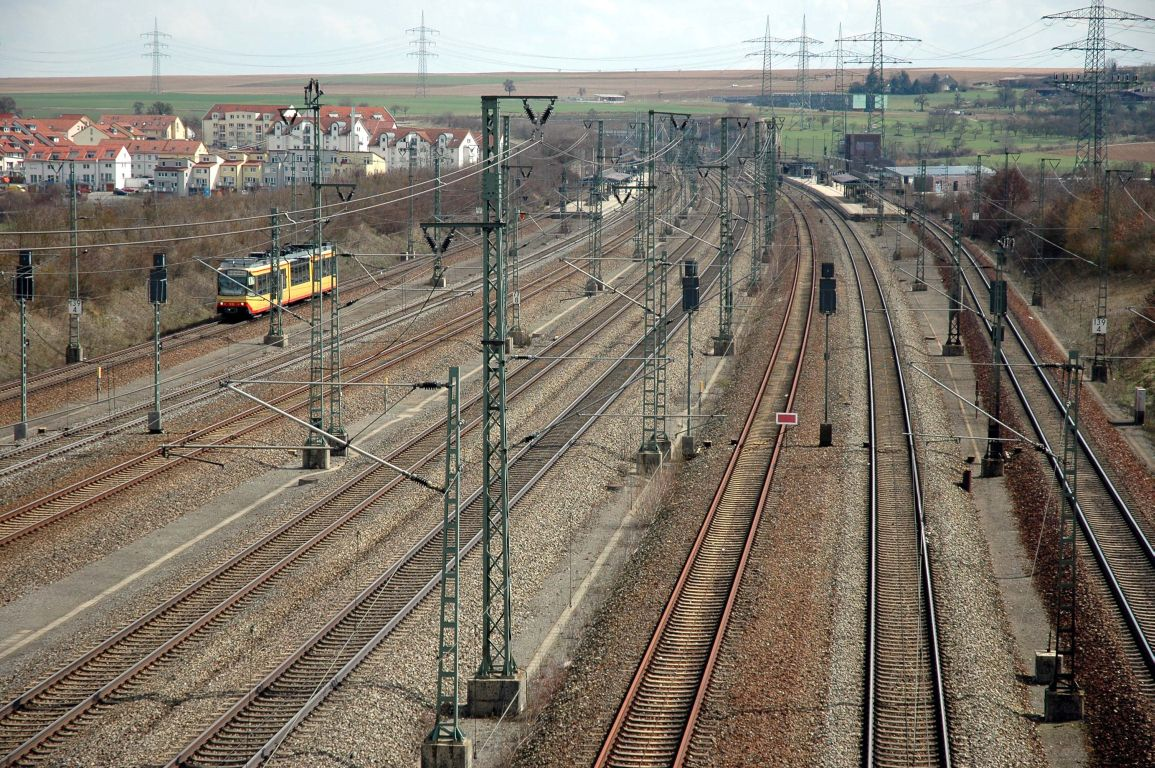
View of the station complex to the southeast. A Karlsruhe Stadtbahn S5 train is on its way to Mühlacker.

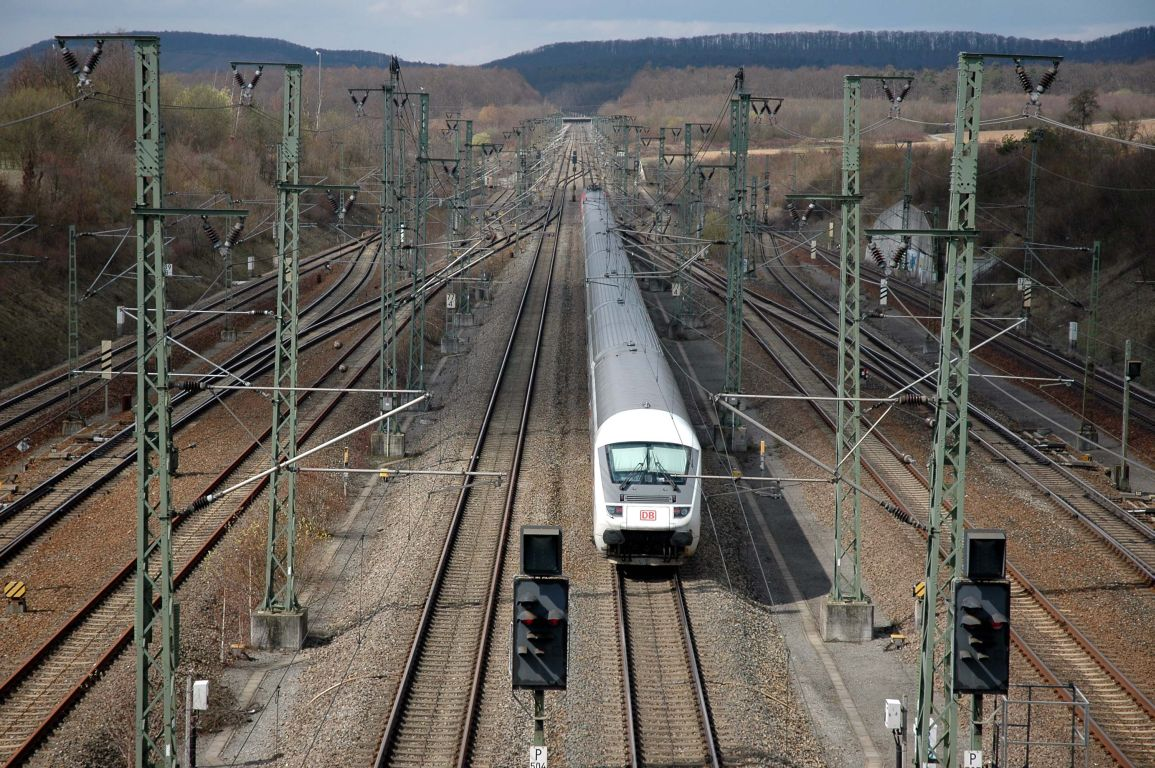
An Intercity train runs through the station towards Mannheim

In long-distance operations (2019 timetable) the station is served by several regular InterCity (IC) services. In regional transport, the station is served by Interregio-Express (IRE) and Regional-Express (RE) services. In the 2026 timetable, the following services stop at the station:

Line	Route	Frequency
ICE 15	Binz – Pasewalk – Berlin – Halle – Erfurt – Frankfurt – Darmstadt – Vaihingen – Stuttgart	Some trains
ICE 22	Hamburg – Hannover – Göttingen – Kassel-Wilhelmshöhe – Frankfurt – Mannheim – Heidelberg – Vaihingen – Stuttgart	One train pair
ICE 45	Cologne – Cologne/Bonn Airport – Siegburg/Bonn – Montabaur – Limburg Süd – Wiesbaden – Mainz – Mannheim – Heidelberg – Vaihingen – Stuttgart	One train pair
ICE 55; IC 55	Dresden – Leipzig – Halle – Magdeburg – Braunschweig – Hanover – Bielefeld – Dortmund – Hagen – Wuppertal – Solingen – Cologne – Bonn – Koblenz – Bingen – Mainz – Mannheim – Heidelberg – Vaihingen – Stuttgart ( – Reutlingen – Tübingen)	Every 2 hours
ICE 55; IC 55	Dortmund – Essen – Düsseldorf – Cologne – Bonn – Koblenz – Mainz – Mannheim – Heidelberg – Vaihingen – Stuttgart – Ulm – Oberstdorf	1 train pair
IC 61	Karlsruhe – Pforzheim – Mühlacker – Vaihingen – Stuttgart – Schwäbisch Gmünd – Aalen – Crailsheim – Ansbach – Nuremberg – Bamberg – Lichtenfels – Kronach – Saalfeld – Jena-Göschwitz – Jena Paradies – Naumburg – Weißenfels – Leipzig	Every 2 hours
ICE 62	Münster – Duisburg – Düsseldorf – Köln Messe/Deutz – Frankfurt Airport – Mannheim – Vaihingen – Stuttgart – Ulm – Augsburg – Munich – Salzburg – Villach – Klagenfurt – Graz	1 train pair
RE 1	Karlsruhe – Pforzheim – Mühlacker – Vaihingen – Stuttgart (– Schorndorf – Schwäbisch Gmünd – Aalen)	Hourly, every two hours to Aalen
MEX 17a	(Bad Wildbad/Wilferdingen-Singen –) Pforzheim – Mühlacker – Vaihingen – Bietigheim-Bissingen – Ludwigsburg – Stuttgart	Hourly (Mon–Fri: Pforzheim–Bietigheim half hourly)
RE 17b	Heidelberg – Bruchsal – Bretten – Mühlacker – Vaihingen – Bietigheim-Bissingen – Ludwigsburg – Stuttgart	Some trains
RB 17c	Bruchsal – Bretten – Mühlacker – Vaihingen – Bietigheim-Bissingen – Ludwigsburg – Stuttgart	Hourly

The original concept was to have six to eight D-Zug express services on the Karlsruhe–Stuttgart route per day as well as an equal number of express services between the Frankfurt Rhine-Main region and Munich. InterCity-stops were not planned. In regional transport, the higher capacity of the new line would be used to add additional regional services if needed. With the connection between the new and old line, it was also possible to establish connections with Karlsruhe (towards Basel) and Stuttgart (towards Munich) that were previously not possible.

The station also serves as an overtaking facility. These were arranged at a distance of about 25 kilometres apart along the new line that was put into operation in 1991. As the originally planned mixed traffic of passenger and freight trains has not been realised, this facility is little used.

== History ==
=== Planning ===
A major reason for building the station was to promote the urban development of the city of Vaihingen and it was envisaged that the core city would merge with the village of Kleinglattbach.

=== Construction ===
The construction of the station complex began on 23 September 1985 with the establishment of the site. On 18 November actual work started on the crossing structures. The design of the station building was created by the Karlsruhe office of Schmitt, Kasimir & Partner and was selected as a result of an architectural competition. On 6 November 1987, a topping-out ceremony for the station building was celebrated and the building was finally completed in September 1990. In the course of construction about ten kilometres of roads were built or rebuilt, along with cycling and foot paths.

About 1.6 million m³ of soil was excavated for the 70 m wide and 2,000 m long station and 1.1 million cubic metres of new earth was put in place. 35 million marks were spent just for earthworks in the station area.

Passenger traffic at the existing station in the centre of Vaihingen was abandoned at the timetable change of 30 September 1990. At the same time the existing line was rerouted on a 7.31 km long section and a 1.36 km long single-track branch line to Vaihingen (Enz) North was put into operation.

The commissioning of the new station shortened the travel time between Vaihingen and Stuttgart from 32 to 15 minutes.
