= Mannheim–Stuttgart high-speed railway =

Railway line in Germany

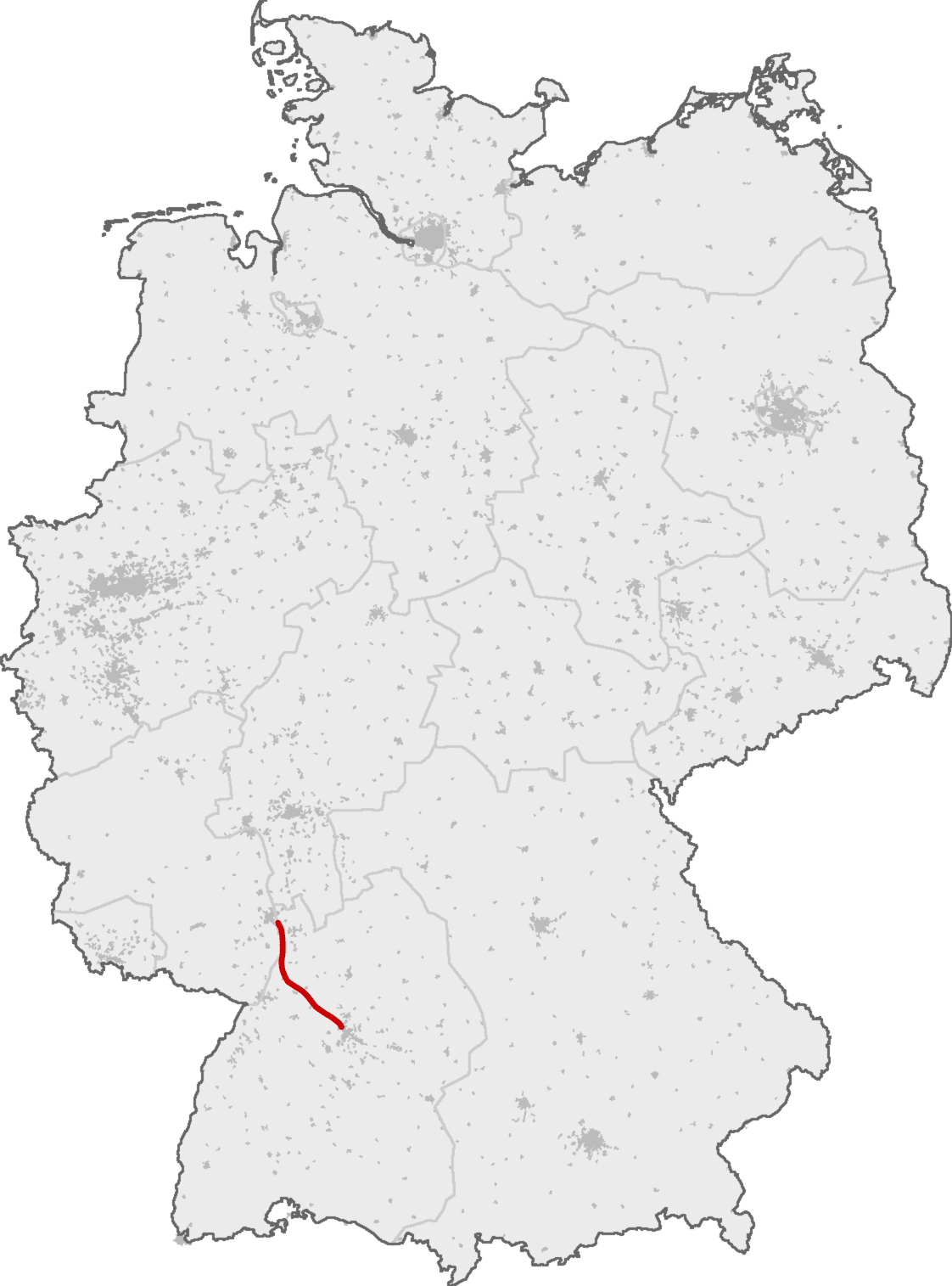

Overview
- Native name: Schnellfahrstrecke Mannheim–Stuttgart
- Line number: 4080
- Locale: Baden-Württemberg, Germany

Service
- Route number: 770

History
- Opened: 9 May 1991

Technical
- Line length: 99 km (62 mi)
- Number of tracks: 2
- Track gauge: 1,435 mm (4 ft 8 1/2 in) standard gauge
- Minimum radius: 5,100 m (16,700 ft)
- Electrification: 15 kV/16.7 Hz AC Overhead catenary
- Operating speed: Service / Maximum (underground): 250 km/h (155 mph); Service / Maximum (aboveground): 280 km/h (175 mph)
- Maximum incline: 1.25%

The Mannheim–Stuttgart high-speed railway is a 99 km (62 mi) long railway line in Germany, connecting the cities of Mannheim and Stuttgart. The line was officially opened on 9 May 1991, and Intercity-Express service began on 2 June. The Hanover–Würzburg high-speed railway also opened at the same time. The line cost about DM 4.5 billion to build and has 15 tunnels and more than 90 bridges.

== Planning ==
Planning for a new line between Mannheim and Stuttgart (the two largest cities of Baden-Württemberg) began in 1970. The railway lines that it replaced followed the terrain and followed rivers and valleys, resulting in steep gradients and sharp curves and thus not suitable for high-speed trains. The 1973 federal transport plan incorporated the following minimum requirements for mixed traffic to accommodate heavy, slow goods trains and light fast passenger trains:

- maximum grade of 1.25% (occasionally 2.0%)
- curves with small superelevation and minimum radii of 4,800 to 7,000 metres (15,700 to 23,000 ft)
- maximum line speed of 250 to 300 km/h (160 to 190 mph)
- average construction costs of 30 to 50 million DM per kilometre
- point-to-point connections between two railway junctions.

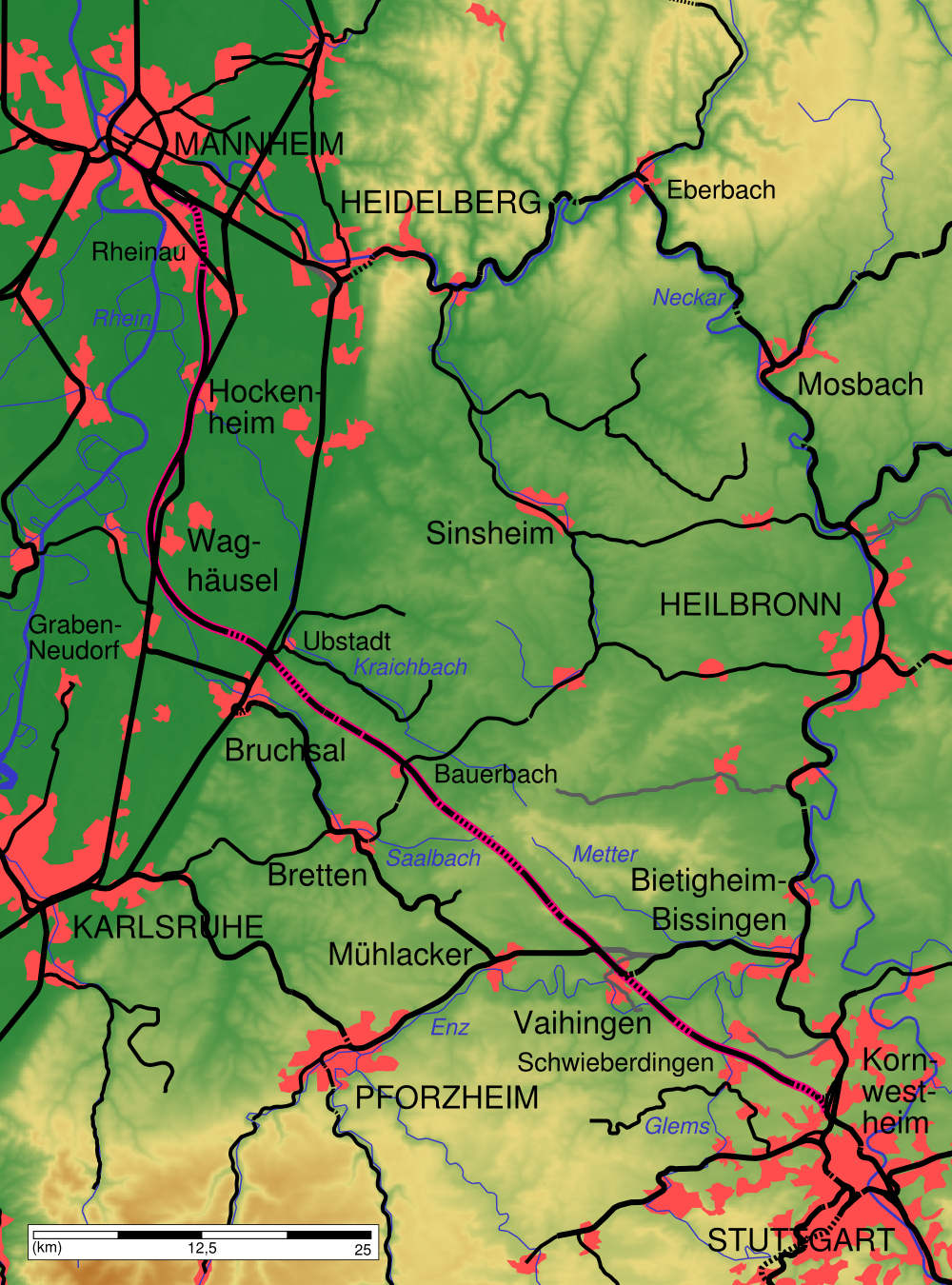
Region

To fulfill these requirements, it was necessary to build a large number of structures such as bridges and tunnels.

In addition, a new technology had to be pursued: the Forst Tunnel is under the water table for its entire length and required a new water-diverting technology. The Freudenstein Tunnel is through the porous rock strata, which flows as a result of heavy rains on the hillsides above it. That geological feature required expensive safeguards, which were used for the first time.

A first planning statement for the Mannheim-Stuttgart route was published in 1974. The Federal Ministry of Transport issued the building permit in 1975, and construction commenced in 1976. More than 6,000 objections led to some route changes during the construction. The construction of some sections was at times completely halted. In seven places the protests of the nearby residents led to the building of cut and cover tunnels. The longest tunnel of this kind was the Pfingstberg tunnel, which leads through a forest, a declared water protection zone, near Mannheim-Rheinau.

The route has a (comparatively low) maximum gradient of 12.5 per thousand with curves having a normal radius of 7,000 m (22,966 ft) and a minimum radius of 5,100 m (16,732 ft). Rises are limited to a maximum of 80 mm (3.1 in). The design speed for ICE trains is 300 km/h (190 mph) and in places limited to 250 km/h (155 mph). Cross-overs were provided for the planned operations mixing passenger and goods trains and for maintenance operations every five to seven kilometres. Planning for the entire route was not resolved until 1985.

== Construction ==
The first section was completed on 31 May 1987 between the junction with the Rhine Railway in Mannheim and Graben-Neudorf. The last section to be completed was the second tube of the Freudenstein Tunnel, which was completed a few months before the opening of the entire line. The commercial service commenced in 1991.

Before the commencement of passenger operations two thousand training runs were undertaken to familiarise drivers with the technical characteristics of driving on high-speed lines, such as in-cab signalling and preventing the application of the emergency brakes.

== Operations ==
The Mannheim-Stuttgart line was opened for commercial operations on 9 May 1991, and the first ICE operation on this route started on 2 June. The maximum speed was initially 250 km/h (155 mph) with 280 km/h (175 mph) permitted to overcome delays. The maximum speed is currently 250 km/h (155 mph) regardless of delays or not. The opening of the line reduced the travel time from Mannheim to Stuttgart from 90 to 44 minutes in 1991. By 2007, the travel time was reduced further to 35–38 minutes.

Since its opening, the various ICE lines have been operating on this route:

- Line 11: Berlin Ostbf, Berlin Hbf, Berlin-Spandau, Braunschweig, Kassel Wilhelmshöhe, Fulda, Frankfurt/Main, Mannheim, Stuttgart, Ulm, Augsburg and München (departing every two hours each way)
- Line 22: Hamburg, Hanover, Göttingen, Kassel-Wilhelmshöhe, Fulda, Frankfurt, Mannheim, Stuttgart, (departing every two hours, each way)
- Line 42: Amsterdam/Dortmund, Duisburg, Düsseldorf, Köln Hbf, Frankfurt Airport – Mannheim Hbf, Stuttgart, Ulm, Augsburg and München (departing every two hours, each way)

The trains travelling between Heidelberg and Karlsruhe (including TGVs) also use the northern section of this route, which connects at Rollenberg Junction.

While the cross-overs were installed every 5 to 7 km (3.1 to 4.3 mi) to allow the goods trains operating on the same line and at the same time as the passenger train, they were relegated to operating at night while the passenger trains were not operating.

== See also ==
- High-speed rail in Germany
