= Landesbühne =

Publicly owned theater companies in Germany and Austria

The term Landesbühne (federal state stage) or Landestheater (federal state theatre) is added to the name of some publicly owned theatre companies in Germany and Austria. These companies have a mandate to perform in areas without public theatres. Less than half of performances usually take place at the seat of a Landesbühne, thereby distinguishing them from the so-called Stadttheater (city theatre) or Staatstheater (national theatre). Legal control can lie with the respective Bundesland or a collaboration of several municipalities and local authorities. The spectrum of presented productions can be very diverse. The repertoire can include all or parts of the popular disciplines: play, musical theatre (opera, operetta, musical), ballet, and children's and youth theatre.

== Germany ==
List of federal state theatres in Germany.

=== Baden-Württemberg ===
- Badische Landesbühne Bruchsal
- Württembergische Landesbühne Esslingen
- Landestheater Tübingen

=== Bavaria ===
- Landestheater Dinkelsbühl
- Theater Hof
- Landesbühne Oberfranken Hollfeld
- Landestheater Niederbayern Landshut, Passau, Straubing
- Landestheater Schwaben Memmingen

=== Brandenburg ===
- Neue Bühne Senftenberg
- Uckermärkische Bühnen Schwedt

=== Hesse ===
- Hessisches Landestheater Marburg

=== Mecklenburg-Vorpommern ===
- Theater und Orchester Neubrandenburg/Neustrelitz

=== Niedersachsen ===
- Theater für Niedersachsen Hildesheim
- Landesbühne Niedersachsen Nord Wilhelmshaven

=== North Rhine-Westphalia ===
- Grenzlandtheater Aachen
- Westfälisches Landestheater Castrop-Rauxel
- Landestheater Detmold
- Landestheater Burghofbühne Dinslaken
- Rheinisches Landestheater Neuss

=== Rhineland-Palatinate ===
- Landesbühne Rheinland-Pfalz Neuwied

=== Saxony ===
- Landesbühnen Sachsen Radebeul bei Dresden
- Elbland Philharmonie Sachsen Riesa

=== Saxony-Anhalt ===
- Landesbühne Sachsen-Anhalt Lutherstadt Eisleben
- Nordharzer Städtebundtheater Halberstadt/Quedlinburg
- Theater der Altmark Stendal

=== Schleswig-Holstein ===
- Schleswig-Holsteinisches Landestheater Rendsburg

== Austria ==
List of federal state theatres in Austria.

=== Lower Austria ===
- Landestheater Niederösterreich Sankt Pölten

=== Salzburg ===
- Salzburger Landestheater

=== Tyrol ===
- Tiroler Landestheater Innsbruck

=== Upper Austria ===
- Landestheater Linz
