= Bretten =

- Town
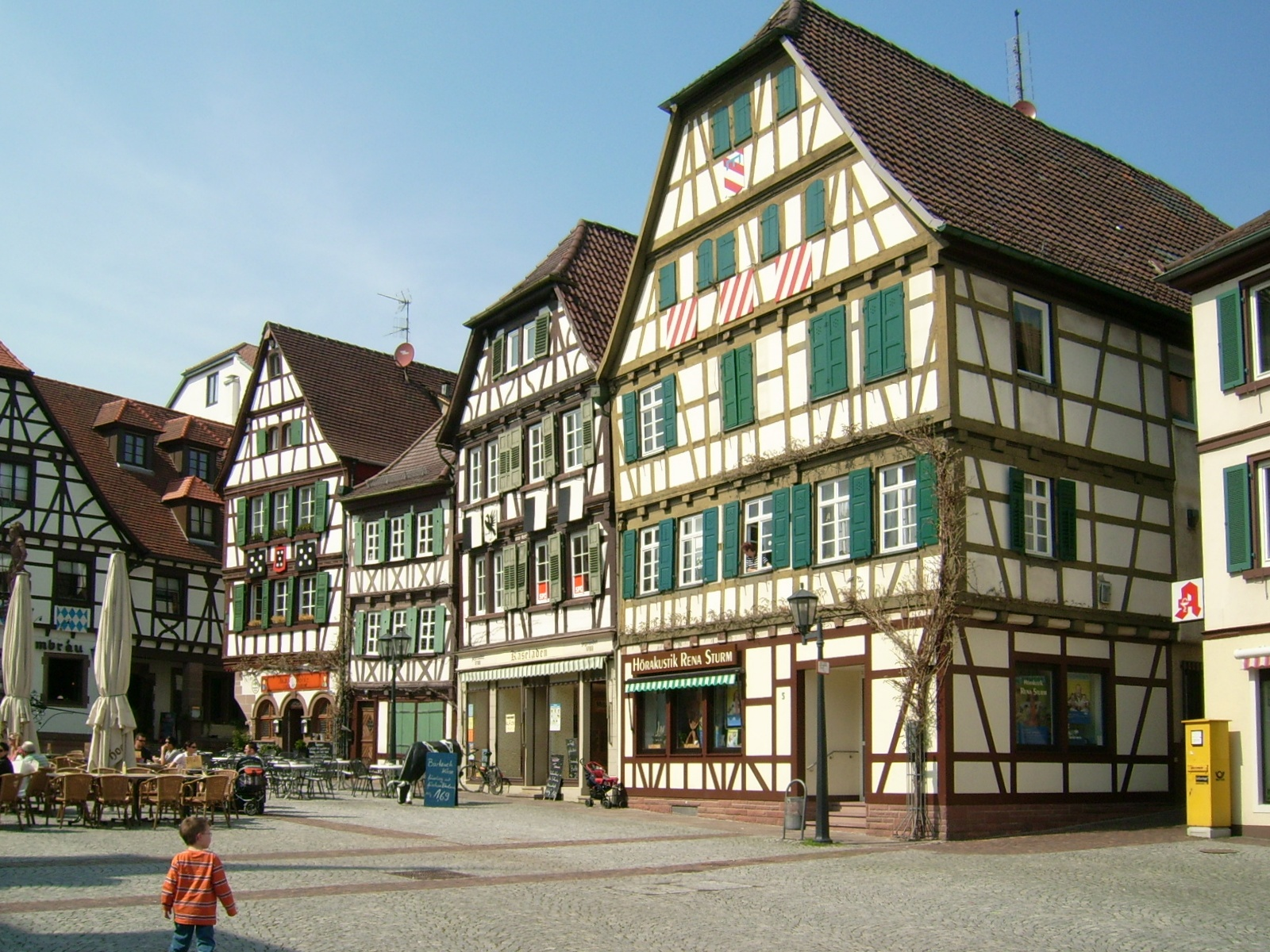

- Flag Coat of arms

- Location of Bretten within Karlsruhe district
- Interactive map of Bretten
- Location within Germany Location within Baden-Württemberg
- Coordinates: 49°02′11″N 08°42′22″E
- Country: Germany
- State: Baden-Württemberg
- Admin. region: Karlsruhe
- District: Karlsruhe
- Subdivisions: 10

Government
  - Mayor (2025–today): Nico Morast (CDU)

Area
  - Total: 71.1 km^{2} (27.5 sq mi)
- Elevation: 176 m (577 ft)

Population (2025-12-31)
  - Total: 30,312
  - Density: 426/km^{2} (1,100/sq mi)
- Time zone: UTC+01:00 (CET)
  - Summer (DST): UTC+02:00 (CEST)
- Postal codes: 75001–75015
- Dialling codes: 07252 and 07258
- Vehicle registration: KA
- Website: www.bretten.de

Bretten (German pronunciation: [ˈbʁɛtn̩]; South Franconian: Bredde) is a town in the state of Baden-Württemberg, Germany. It is located on the Bertha Benz Memorial Route.

== Geography ==
Bretten lies in the centre of a rectangle that is formed by Heidelberg, Karlsruhe, Heilbronn and Stuttgart as corners. It has a population of approximately 28,000. The centre of Bretten consists of many old half-timbered houses around a lively marketplace. Towns and villages under the administration of Bretten include Bauerbach, Büchig, Diedelsheim, Dürrenbüchig, Gölshausen, Neibsheim, Rinklingen, Ruit and Sprantal.

== History ==
Bretten was first mentioned as "villa breteheim" in the "Lorsch codex" in 767. Since 1148 Bretten had the right to mint and issue coins. In 1254 Bretten received city rights. In 1492 Bretten was granted to hold four fairs by Pfalzgraf Philipp. Philipp Melanchthon was born in Bretten in 1497. The residents of Bretten successfully sallied against the Swabian besiegers around Ulrich of Württemberg in 1504. In 1803 Bretten became “Badische Amtsstadt”. After the industrial revolution, the local economy was dominated by cooker production for many years. In 1975 Bretten was given the status of a "Große Kreisstadt" (district city).

== Transport ==
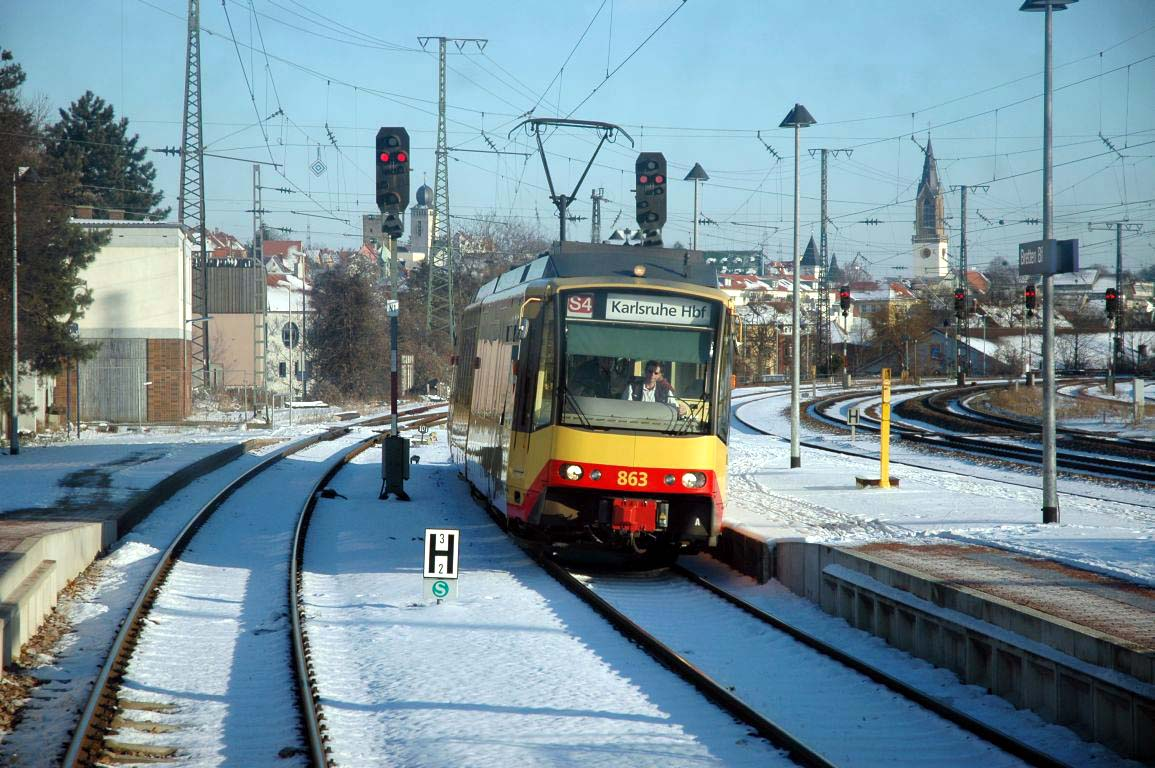
Bretten station

Bretten station is on the Württemberg Western Railway and the Kraichgau Railway. Every two hours there are direct train connections to Stuttgart and Heidelberg. Many commuters use S4 services of the Karlsruhe Stadtbahn, which runs three times an hour to Karlsruhe and back. In Bretten there are five Stadtbahn stations and five more stations in the villages that belong to the district of Bretten. The motorways A5, A6 and A8 are reachable within approximately 30 minutes.

== Peter and Paul Festival ==
The largest event in Bretten is the annual Peter and Paul Festival, which usually attracts up to 80,000 visitors. It is held one long weekend in summer. The main attractions are the numerous performances in countless camps and in the medieval lanes in the old town of Bretten. On Sunday, a huge procession of dressed-up citizens and guest groups takes place.

Visitors may be irritated or amused by the mixture of costumes which are related to different centuries. You can see medieval men-at-arms, shepherds, musicians and jugglers, as well as Biedermeier styled families and militias. But the festival has three different sources. The oldest is the successful sally of citizens and men-at-arms on June 28, 1504 against Swabian besiegers. Bretten was also the place for a traditional competition called the “shepherds’ jump”, that was celebrated by all local shepherds. During the 16th and the 18th century several shooting competitions took place, some of them on the Peter and Paul Day. In 1805 a citizen's militia was founded in Bretten. Since then the Peter and Paul Festival has been celebrated regularly. After the Revolution in Baden the militias were not allowed to wear weapons anymore and the festival became a children’s festival. In 1923 the militia was refounded and the festival became bigger, with many guests and militias from other towns. After World War II the American administration allowed the festival to happen again in 1950, with a new militia and several societies that promoted the medieval aspects of the sally in 1504. Nowadays the organising society tends to advance the medieval aspects of the festival. Many citizens of Bretten are busy all the year round organising the Festival, preparing their costumes, studying old books, practising music (especially drumming), fighting, dancing, juggling or practising other performances. Since the 1980s, the organising society has also engaged professional artists.

The festival also provides a fairground that attracts mainly kids and teenagers. For most citizens and guests the festival is the most important meeting point for former, existing or new friendships, or – as a pupil told the Bretten newspapers: “For me the Peter-and-Paul-Festival is a festival of love”.

== Education ==
- Melanchthon-Gymnasium
- Edith-Stein-Gymnasium
- Max-Planck-Realschule
- Schillerschule
- Berufliche Schulen Bretten
- Johann-Peter-Hebel Schule
- Hohbergschule

== Media ==
- Newspaper: Brettener Woche/Kraichgauer Bote

== Entertainment ==
Bretten is known for its historical vigilante group the Bürgerwehr Bretten formed by members of the Stadtkapelle Bretten the local orchestra band.

Not only does Bretten host the yearly Peter-und-Paul Fest to relieve the town’s medieval history, but it is also part of Germanys yearly carnival celebrations. The Brettener Bütt is one of the regions biggest Prunksitzungen since 1974.

The Gugg-e-mol theatre is Brettens only theatre based in an old cellar. Plays and performances also take place at the Stadtparkhalle or the local park, often hosted and toured by the Badische Landesbühne.

Bretten has one cinema in the town centre and one local library that serves all area districts.

== Twin towns – sister cities ==
Bretten is twinned with:

- Condeixa-a-Nova, Portugal
- Hemer, Germany
- Hidas, Hungary
- Longjumeau, France
- Nemesnádudvar, Hungary
- Neuflize, France
- Pontypool, Wales, United Kingdom
- Valserhône, France
- Wittenberg, Germany

== Notable people ==
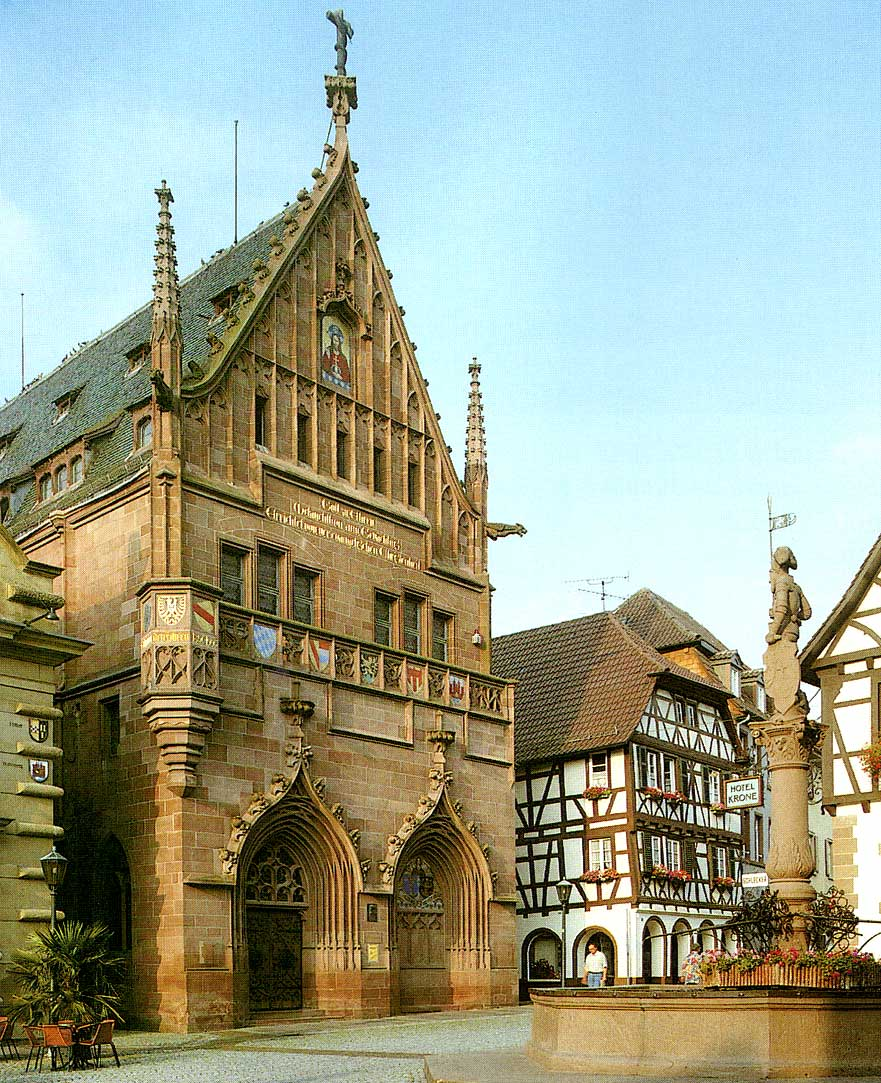
A house that stands where Philipp Melanchthon was born. The foundation was laid on Philipp Melanchthon's 400th birthday, on 16 February 1897. It was built to be a museum and library.

- Schwickart the Younger of Sickingen (died 1478), an imperial knight, Amtmann of Bretten
- Philipp Melanchthon (1497–1560), theologian and ally of the Protestant reformer Martin Luther.
- Samuel Eisenmenger (1534–1585), physician, theologian and astronomer
- Christian Mayer (1827–1910), Wisconsin businessman, mayor and legislator, emigrated 1852.
- Mile Kekin (born 1971), frontman of the Croatian band Hladno pivo

=== Sport ===
- Peter Reichert (born 1961), footballer, played over 275 games
- Serhat Akın (born 1981), footballer, played 258 games and 16 for Turkey
- Selçuk Alibaz (born 1989), footballer, played over 315 games
- Philipp Förster (born 1995), footballer who has played over 250 games
- Roman Hauk (born 1999), footballer who has played over 210 games
