= Karlsruhe West station =

Railway station in Karlsruhe, Germany

Karlsruhe West

General information
- Location: Hardeckstraße 1; 76185 Karlsruhe; Baden-Württemberg; Germany
- Coordinates: 49.002408531°N 8.3626245730°E
- System: Bf
- Owner: Deutsche Bahn
- Operator: DB Netz; DB Station&Service
- Lines: Winden–Karlsruhe (KBS 676)
- Platforms: 2 side platforms
- Tracks: 2
- Train operators: DB Regio Mitte; Karlsruhe Stadtbahn

Construction
- Parking: yes
- Cycle facilities: yes
- Accessible: yes

Other information
- Fare zone: KVV: 100
- Website: www.bahnhof.de

Services
Preceding station	DB Regio Mitte	Following station
Karlsruhe-Mühlburg towards Neustadt (Weinstraße) Hbf	RE 6 Limited service	Karlsruhe Hbf Terminus
Wörth (Rhein) towards Pirmasens Hbf	RE 55 Limited service	Karlsruhe Hbf Terminus
Karlsruhe-Mühlburg towards Annweiler am Trifels or Neustadt (Weinstraße) Hbf	RB 51	Karlsruhe Hbf Terminus
Karlsruhe-Mühlburg One-way operation	RB 52 Limited service	Karlsruhe Hbf One-way operation
Karlsruhe-Mühlburg towards Bad Bergzabern	RB 54 Limited service	Karlsruhe Hbf towards Winden (Pfalz)
Preceding station	Karlsruhe Stadtbahn	Following station
Karlsruhe Mühlburg towards Germersheim	S 52	Karlsruhe Albtalbahnhof towards Karlsruhe Marktplatz
Location
- Location within Baden-Württemberg Location within Germany Location within Europe

Karlsruhe West station is a railway station in the Grünwinkel district in the municipality of Karlsruhe, located in Baden-Württemberg, Germany.
