= Karlsruhe-Hagsfeld station =

Railway station in Karlsruhe, Germany

Karlsruhe-Hagsfeld
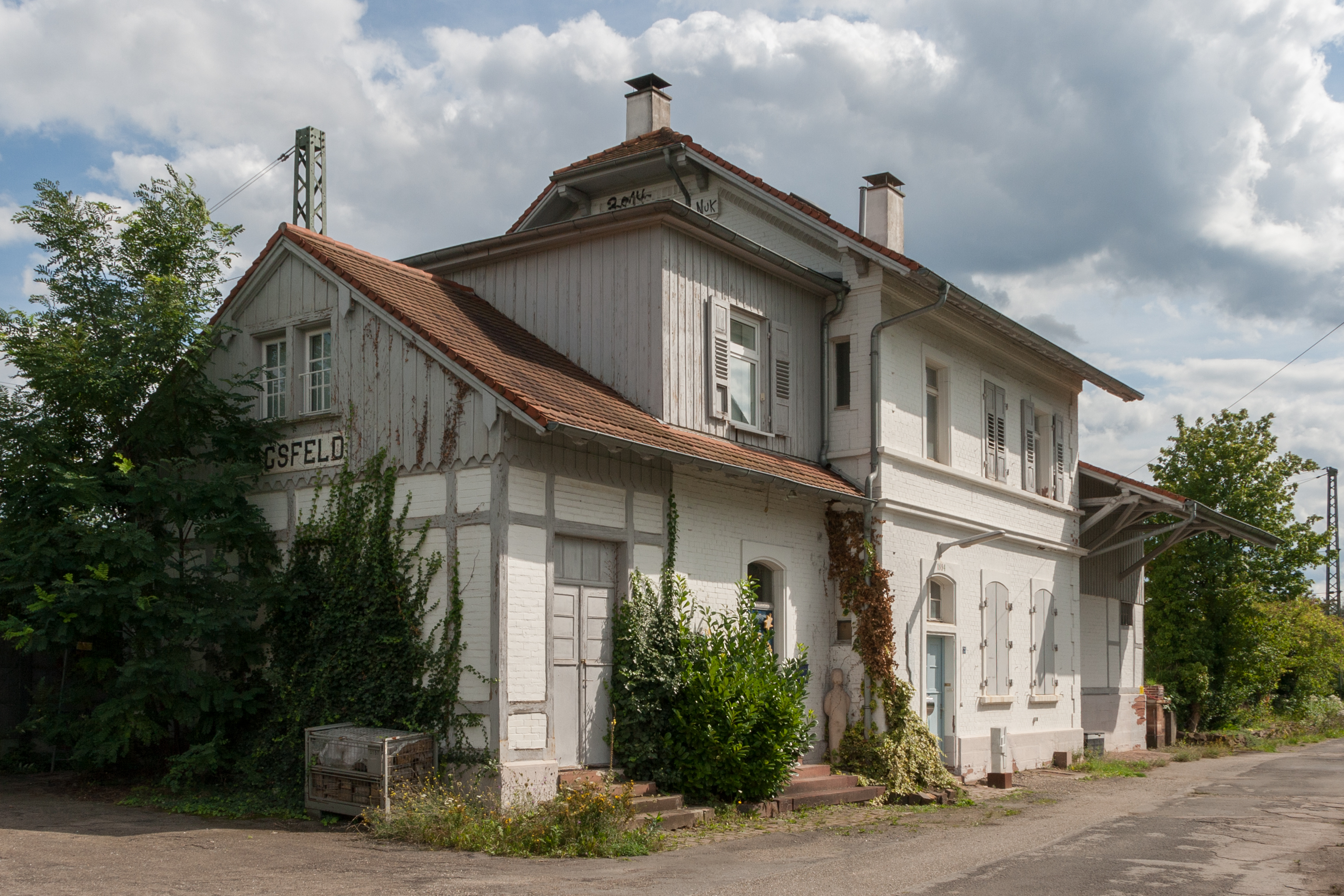
- 2014

General information
- Location: Karlsruher Straße 73; 76139 Hagsfeld; Baden-Württemberg; Germany
- Coordinates: 49.0259°N 8.4535°E
- System: Bf
- Owner: Deutsche Bahn
- Operator: DB Netz; DB Station&Service
- Lines: Mannheim–Karlsruhe railway (KBS 700)
- Platforms: 2 side platforms
- Tracks: 2
- Train operators: DB Regio Mitte
- Connections: S 2 S 9

Construction
- Parking: yes
- Cycle facilities: yes
- Accessible: yes

Other information
- Station code: 3110
- DS100 code: RKHA
- IBNR: 8003185
- Category: 5
- Fare zone: KVV: 100
- Website: www.bahnhof.de

Services
Preceding station	Karlsruhe Stadtbahn	Following station
Hagsfeld Süd towards Mörsch Bach-West	S 2	Geroldsäcker towards Spöck Richard-Hecht-Schule
Preceding station	Rhine-Neckar S-Bahn	Following station
Karlsruhe Hbf Terminus	S9	Blankenloch towards Groß‑Rohrheim
Location
- Location within Baden-Württemberg Location within Germany Location within Europe

Karlsruhe-Hagsfeld station is a railway station in the Hagsfeld district in the municipality of Karlsruhe, located in Baden-Württemberg, Germany.
