= Karlsruhe Hauptbahnhof =

Railway station in Germany

Karlsruhe Hbf
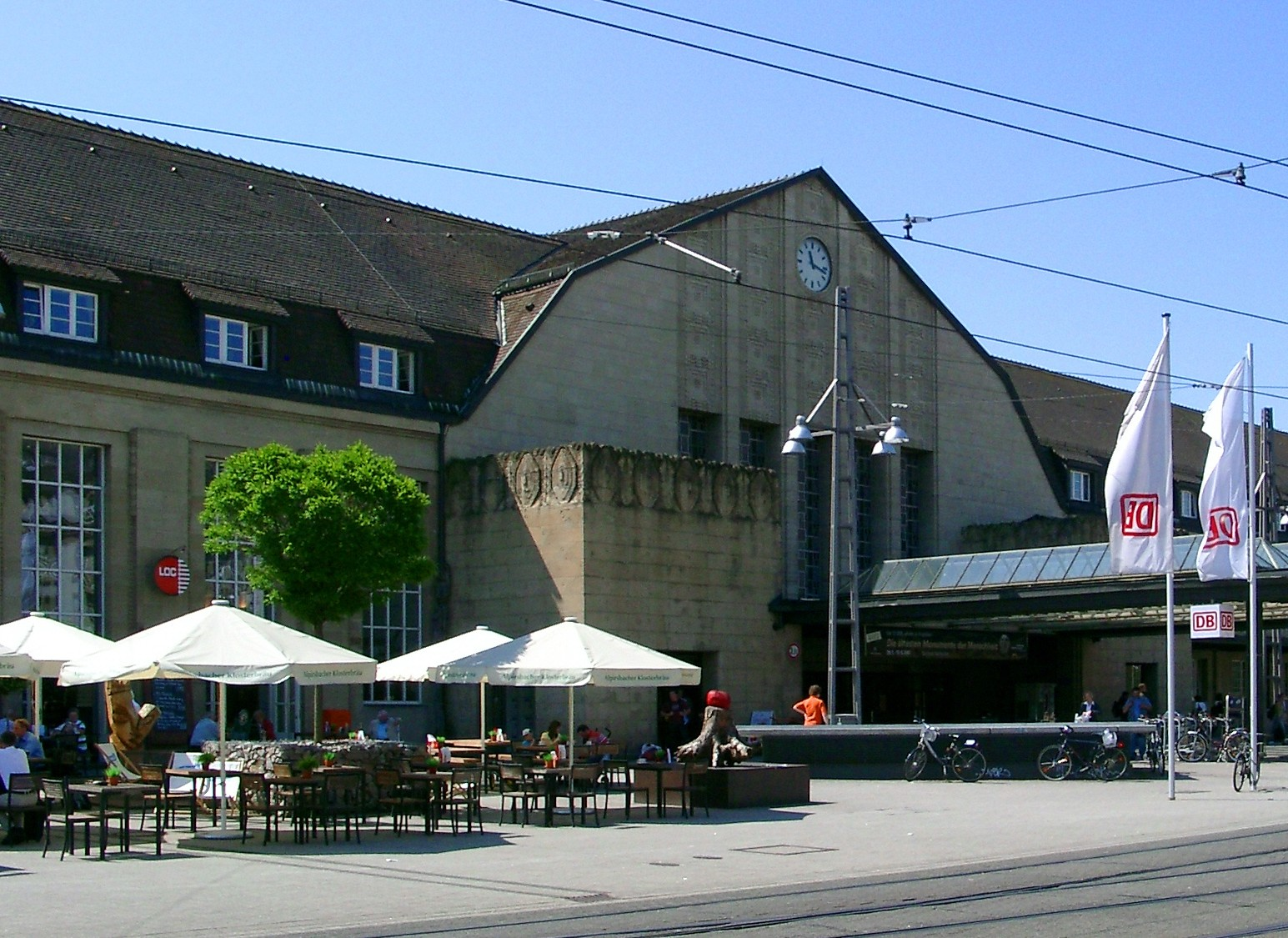
- Main entrance

General information
- Location: Bahnhofplatz 1a 76137 Karlsruhe; Karlsruhe, Baden-Württemberg; Germany
- Coordinates: 48°59′38″N 8°24′2″E
- Lines: Karlsruhe–Mühlacker railway; Winden–Karlsruhe railway; Rhine Valley Railway; Rhine Railway
- Platforms: 16

Construction
- Accessible: Yes
- Architectural style: Neoclassical and Art Nouveau

Other information
- Station code: 3107
- DS100 code: RK
- IBNR: 8000191
- Category: 1
- Fare zone: KVV: 100
- Website: www.bahnhof.de

History
- Opened: 1913

Passengers
- 60,000 daily
Services
Preceding station	DB Fernverkehr	Following station
Baden-Baden towards Brig, Chur or Interlaken Ost	ICE 12	Mannheim Hbf towards Berlin Ostbahnhof
Terminus	ICE 13	Bruchsal towards Berlin Ostbahnhof
Baden-Baden towards Basel SBB	ICE/ECE 20	Mannheim Hbf towards Hamburg Hbf
Terminus	ICE 26	Bruchsal towards Oldenburg Hbf
Freiburg Hbf towards Basel SBB, Chur or Brig	ICE 43	Mannheim Hbf towards Hamburg-Altona or Amsterdam Centraal
Baden-Baden towards Basel SBB	ICE 60	Bruchsal towards München Hbf
Terminus	IC 61	Pforzheim Hbf towards Nürnberg Hbf or Leipzig Hbf
Strasbourg towards Paris Est	ICE/TGV 82	Mannheim Hbf towards Frankfurt (Main) Hbf
Strasbourg towards Paris Est	ICE/TGV 83	Stuttgart Hbf towards München Hbf
Baden-Baden towards Marseille	ICE/TGV 84	Mannheim Hbf towards Frankfurt (Main) Hbf
Ringsheim/Europa-Park towards Milano Centrale	ECE 85	Mannheim Hbf towards Frankfurt (Main) Hbf
Preceding station	DB Regio Baden-Württemberg	Following station
Rastatt towards Konstanz	RE 2	Terminus
Rastatt towards Basel Bad Bf	RE 7	Terminus
Preceding station	DB Regio Mitte	Following station
Terminus	RE 4	Graben-Neudorf towards Frankfurt (Main) Hbf
Wörth (Rhein) towards Kaiserslautern Hbf	RE 6	Terminus
Terminus	RE 9	Karlsruhe-Hagsfeld towards Mannheim Hbf
Terminus	RE 45	Karlsruhe-Durlach towards Heilbronn Hbf
Wörth (Rhein) towards Pirmasens Hbf	RE 55	Terminus
Terminus	RE 73	Karlsruhe-Durlach towards Heidelberg Hbf
Ettlingen West towards Freudenstadt Hbf	RB 41	Terminus
Ettlingen West towards Achern	RB 44	Terminus
Karlsruhe West towards Neustadt (Weinstraße) Hbf	RB 51	Terminus
Karlsruhe-Mühlburg towards Lauterbourg	RB 52 Sa only	Terminus
Karlsruhe West towards Lauterbourg	RB 54 Limited service	Terminus
Preceding station		Following station
Terminus	RE 1	Karlsruhe-Durlach towards Aalen Hbf
Preceding station	(Stuttgart)	Following station
Terminus	MEX 17a	Karlsruhe-Durlach towards Stuttgart Hbf
Preceding station	Albtal-Verkehrs-Gesellschaft	Following station
Ettlingen West towards Bad Herrenalb	FEX Freizeitexpress (Su only)	Karlsruhe-Durlach towards Menzingen (Baden) or Odenheim
Preceding station	Rhine-Neckar S-Bahn	Following station
Wörth (Rhein) towards Germersheim	S3	Karlsruhe-Durlach towards Germersheim
Terminus	S9	Karlsruhe-Hagsfeld towards Groß‑Rohrheim
Preceding station	Karlsruhe Stadtbahn	Following station
Karlsruhe Albtalbahnhof towards Bad Herrenalb	S 1	Karlsruhe Poststraße towards Hochstetten
Karlsruhe Albtalbahnhof towards Ittersbach Rathaus	S 11	Karlsruhe Poststraße towards Hochstetten
Karlsruhe Albtalbahnhof Terminus	S 4	Karlsruhe Poststraße towards Öhringen-Cappel
Karlsruhe Albtalbahnhof towards Achern	S 7	Karlsruhe Poststraße towards Karlsruhe Tullastraße / Alter Schlachthof
Karlsruhe Albtalbahnhof towards Bondorf (b Herrenberg)	S 8	Karlsruhe Poststraße towards Karlsruhe Tullastraße / Alter Schlachthof
Terminus	S 31	Karlsruhe-Durlach towards Odenheim
Terminus	S 32	Karlsruhe-Durlach towards Menzingen (Baden)
Preceding station	Karlsruhe tram	Following station
Karlsruhe Ebertstraße towards Knielingen Nord	2	Karlsruhe Poststraße towards Wolfartsweier Nord
Karlsruhe Ebertstraße towards Karlsruhe Rheinbergstraße	3	Karlsruhe Poststraße towards Rintheim
Location

Karlsruhe Hauptbahnhof is a railway station in the German city of Karlsruhe. The station is classified as a Category 1 station, as it is a major hub where several railways connect.

== History ==
=== Old station ===
When the Baden Mainline was built between Mannheim and Basel, the original Karlsruhe station was built on Kriegsstraße between Ettlinger Tor and Mendelssohnplatz about 500 metres south of Karlsruher Marktplatz, the central square of Karlsruhe. The station was designed by Friedrich Eisenlohr and it was opened on 1 April 1843 with two platforms. From the beginning, it was designed as a through station. South of the station there was a locomotive depot and to its east there was a freight yard and a central workshop.

It was built to Irish gauge (1,600 mm (5 ft 3 in)), as were all railways built by the Grand Duchy of Baden State Railway in the early days. It was converted to standard gauge in 1855. In the following years other routes were connected to Karlsruhe station: in 1859 the line to Stuttgart, in 1863 the Maxau Railway (German: Maxaubahn) connecting with the Palatinate, in 1870 the Rhine Railway to Mannheim, in 1879 the Kraichgau Railway and in 1895 the strategic railway from Graben-Neudorf via Rastatt to Haguenau. The tracks ran at ground level and the approach lines were built with sharp curves because of the confined spaces.

The increased rail traffic and the resulting frequent closures of the level crossings disrupted the ever-growing city and made its expansion more difficult. After several years of discussion, which considered, among other things, the raising of the level of the tracks, the Baden parliament decided in 1902 to relocate the station to a site one kilometre south of the existing site.

After the opening of the new station in 1913, the existing railway station lost its function as a railway station and continued to be used until the 1960s as a market hall. Today, the Baden State Theatre is located on the former railway yard. Some of the remaining tracks were used over the decades as sidings, but have since been entirely removed. The freight yard was used as a repair shop until 1997. Ludwig-Erhard-Allee was built in the meantime on the grounds of the freight yard, the workshop area is currently being redeveloped with blocks of flats (2010).

=== New station ===
The station building, which continues in use, was built about a kilometre south of its predecessor between Südstadt and the marshalling yard. Construction began in 1910 to the plans of August Stürzenacker and the station was opened on the night of 22/23 October 1913. The station and access tracks were built in the district of Beiertheim and also occupied a significant part of the Stadtgarten (city garden, the location of Karlsruhe Zoo) and the garden behind the Stephanienbad (now Paul-Gerhardt) church. This resulted in the cutting down of the then oldest eastern cottonwood poplar in Europe.

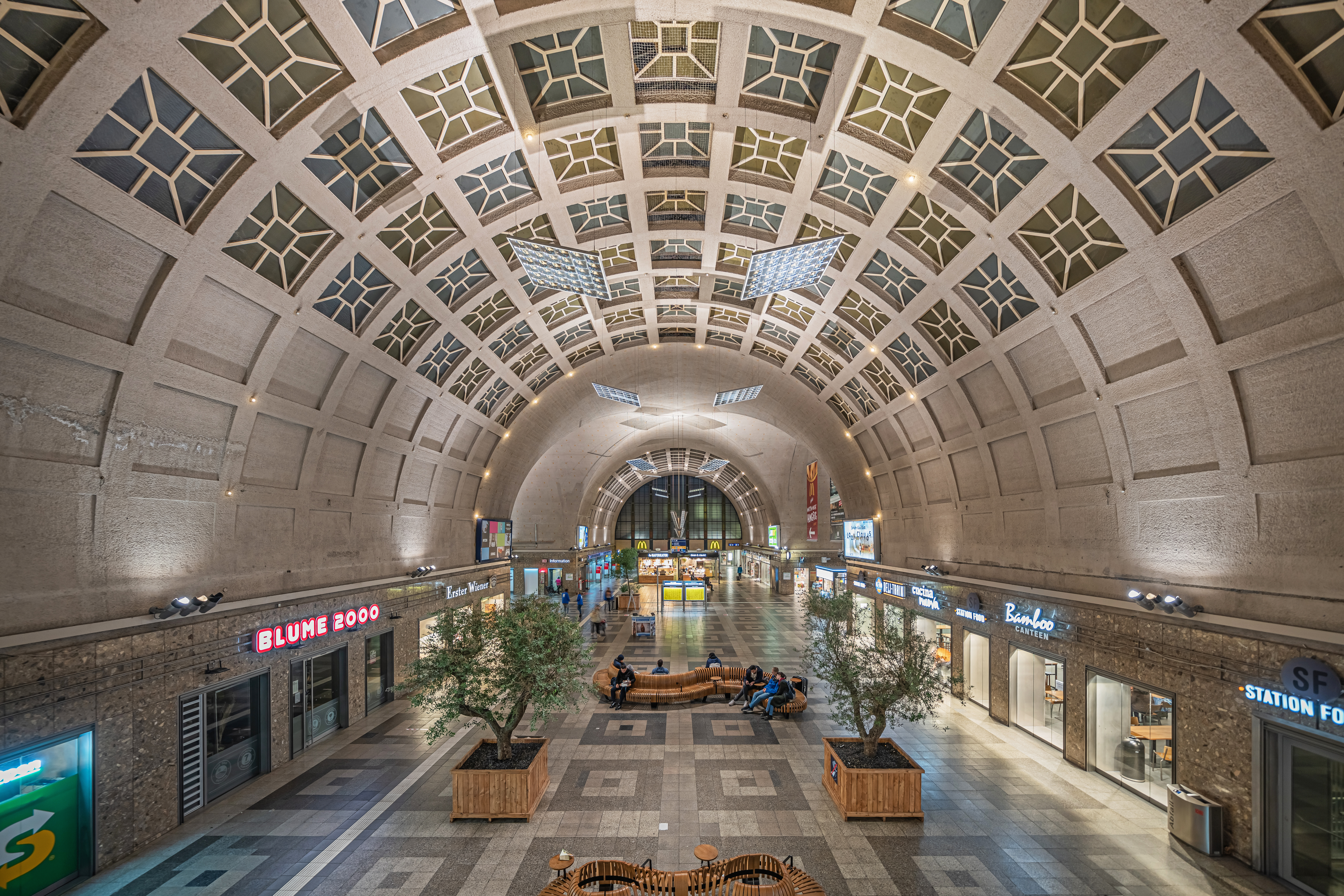
Entrance hall

The platforms and the approach tracks were built on an embankment, with access via a pedestrian underpass. The entrance building is on the north side of the tracks. The building has both neoclassical and Art Nouveau features. East of the station building there is a second underpass, which originally served as an outlet for arriving passengers and was used for a time mainly as an underground car park and a few years ago for secure bicycle parking, but it is now back in use as a pedestrian underpass. A five-span, steel concourse was built to cover five island platforms. Later an eleventh platform track was built and, in the 1980s, three more platform tracks were created south of the station concourse. West of the station building a station annex was built with four terminal tracks, where the lines from the Palatinate and Graben-Neudorf (via Eggenstein) terminated. The construction of the new station also affected the access routes. Thus, the former stations at Mühlburger Tor in Karlsruhe and in Beiertheim and Rüppurr were closed. The stations in Mühlburg and Durlach were relocated and the tracks of the line to Mühlacker, which had previously ended in Durlach, were extended to the new Hauptbahnhof, so that there were now four tracks between Durlach and Karlsruhe. Also the new Karlsruhe-West station was opened for passenger services.

The station forecourt was designed by Wilhelm Vitalli. The square with a rectangular ground plan is surrounded by arcades. At the end of the square to the east and the west are two hotel buildings and on the northern side is the entrance to the Stadtgarten and the commercial buildings. The station forecourt is a typical ensemble of urban architecture from the last years before the First World War. East of the station was the railway post office, which had a railway siding on the tramway as well.

A week before the opening of the station a tram line was opened between Ettlinger Tor and the new station, which—after removal of the access tracks to the old station—was connected to the city centre. A new terminus for the Alb Valley Railway (Albtalbahn) was opened 300 meters west of the station in Ebertstraße in 1915.

=== Development of the station ===
In the Second World War, the station was damaged by bombing, but not destroyed, so that it could be rebuilt after the war. The period after 1950 was characterised by a continuous modernisation of the station and the forecourt. In 1957, the electrification of the railway was completed. In 1969, the rebuilding of the station forecourt began, where—in the spirit of the times—a pedestrian underpass was created and the car and tram traffic were reorganised. In 1977, a new interlocking controlled by pushing buttons was put into operation.

At the end of the 1980s, the station was expanded to include three through tracks, 12–14, and a parking garage was built. This was intended to be followed by a redesign of the area immediately south of the station, but this has still not been implemented. Two platforms were extended and modernised for Karlsruhe's inclusion in the Intercity-Express network and the access stairs were complemented with lifts and escalators.

In 1995, there was a further reorganisation of the station forecourt, during which the pedestrian underpass was closed and the tram station was rebuilt. In 1996, a rail link was built between the western track south of the station and the Albtalbahnhof (the Karlsruhe station of the Alb Valley Railway), over which Stadtbahn (light rail) services could run to Rastatt as line S 4/S 41 of the Karlsruhe Stadtbahn between the rail network and the tram network. As a result, two terminating tracks, 103 and 104, were no longer necessary and, in the mid-2000s, they were closed, so the station now has 14 through tracks, 1–14, and two terminating tracks, 101 and 102.

== Operations ==
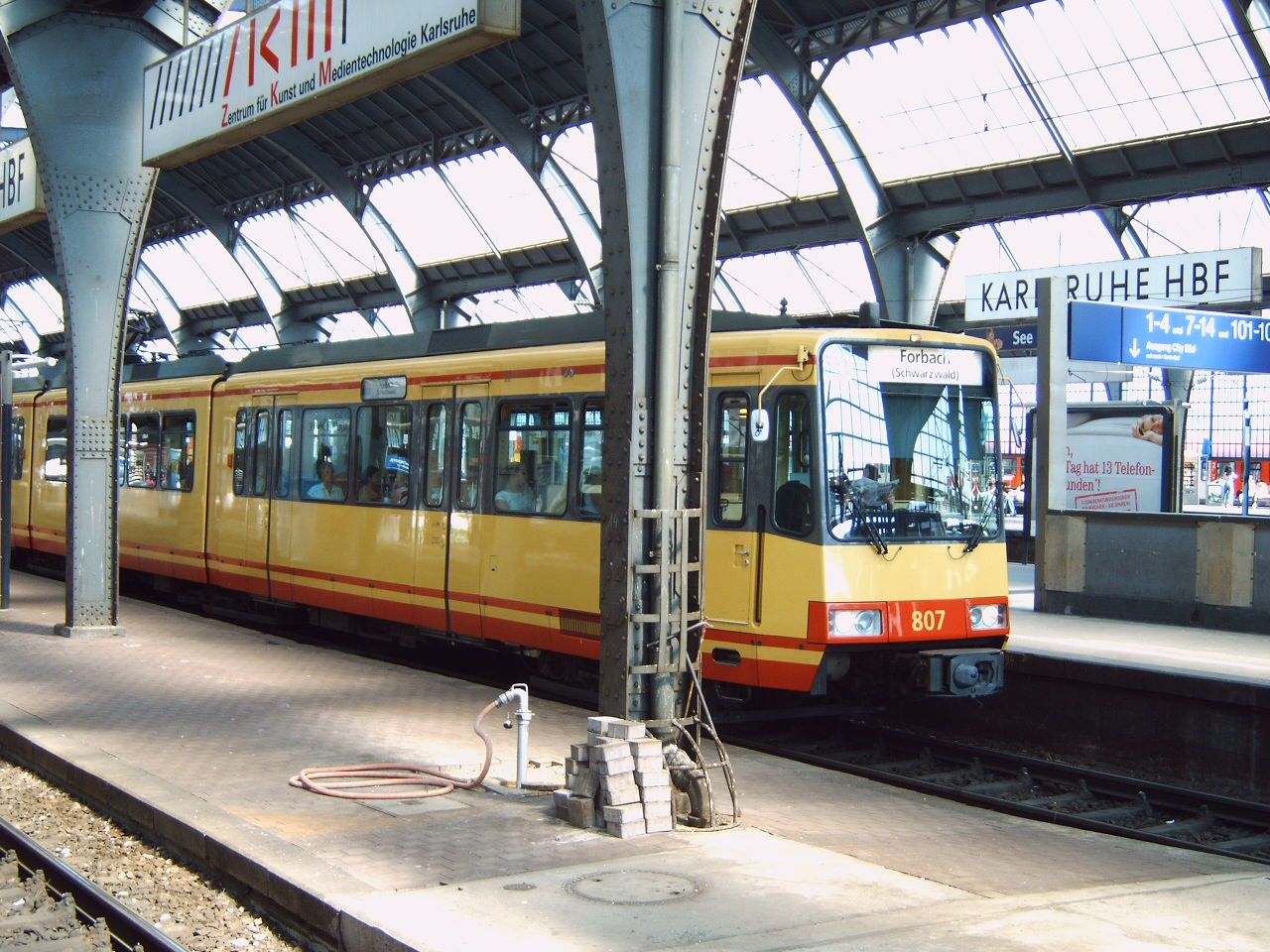
Tram-train ("Stadtbahnwagen") in the station

The Karlsruhe station is classified by Deutsche Bahn as a category 1 station. It is served by Intercity-Express trains to Berlin, Hamburg, Dortmund and Basel, from Intercity trains to Stralsund, Cologne, Nuremberg, Munich and Konstanz and by TGV trains to Paris and Stuttgart. It is also served by Regional-Express services to Neustadt an der Weinstraße, Mainz, Stuttgart and Konstanz as well as local and S-Bahn services in the Karlsruhe region. According to DB the station receives about 60,000 passengers and visitors each day.

The tracks are designed for through services, with platform tracks 1–4 being used for services on the route to Mannheim and Basel, tracks 5–8 for services to and from Heidelberg and Rastatt, tracks 9–14 for services to and from Rastatt and Pforzheim and tracks 101 and 102 for services between Karlsruhe and Neustadt. The through tracks 1–14 can be approached from all lines while tracks 101 and 102 can only be used by services to and from Wörth and Durmersheim.

West of the station are carriage sidings with a turntable and the Karlsruhe depot of DB Regio. East of the station there is a second set of carriage sidings. A connecting track allows shunting between the station and Karlsruhe freight yard.

According to DB, the station is used by 130 long-distance trains, 133 regional trains and 121 S-Bahn trains each day (as at 29 June 2011).

=== Long-distance services ===
The station is served by 130 long-distance trains each day, mainly ICEs and ICs on the Rhine route and TGV Duplex trains between Paris and Stuttgart. In the 2026 timetable, the following long-distance services stop at the station:

Line	Route			Interval
ICE 12	Switzerland – Basel – Freiburg – Karlsruhe – Mannheim – Frankfurt – Kassel – Braunschweig – Wolfsburg – Berlin – Berlin Ostbahnhof			Every two hours
ICE 13	Karlsruhe – Heidelberg – Darmstadt – Frankfurt South – Kassel – Braunschweig – Wolfsburg – Berlin – Berlin Ostbahnhof			Every 4 hours
ICE/ECE 20	Hamburg – Hannover – Kassel-Wilhelmshöhe – Frankfurt – Mannheim – Karlsruhe – Baden-Baden – Freiburg – Basel SBB			Every 2 hours
ICE 26	Bremen – Hannover – Kassel-Wilhelmshöhe – Gießen – Frankfurt – Heidelberg – Karlsruhe			Every 4 hours
ICE 43	Hamburg-Altona – Hamburg – Bremen – Osnabrück - Münster – Dortmund – Essen – Düsseldorf –		Cologne – Frankfurt Airport – Mannheim – Karlsruhe – Offenburg – Freiburg – Basel (–Zürich – Chur) / (– Bern – Brig)	Every two hours
ICE 43	Hannover – Bielefeld – Dortmund – Wuppertal –	(coupled / split)	Cologne – Frankfurt Airport – Mannheim – Karlsruhe – Offenburg – Freiburg – Basel (–Zürich – Chur) / (– Bern – Brig)	1 train pair
ICE 43	Amsterdam – Arnheim – Duisburg – Düsseldorf –	(coupled / split)	Cologne – Frankfurt Airport – Mannheim – Karlsruhe – Offenburg – Freiburg – Basel (–Zürich – Chur) / (– Bern – Brig)	1 train pair
ICE 60	(Basel SBB – Freiburg – Offenburg – Baden-Baden –) Karlsruhe – Stuttgart – Ulm – Augsburg – Munich			Every two hours
IC 61	Karlsruhe – Pforzheim – Mühlacker – Vaihingen – Stuttgart – Aalen – Crailsheim – Nuremberg – Bamberg – Jena Paradies – Leipzig			Every two hours
ICE/TGV 82	Paris Est – Strasbourg – Karlsruhe – Mannheim – Frankfurt			Two train pairs
ICE/TGV 83	Paris Est – Strasbourg – Karlsruhe – Stuttgart (– Ulm – Augsburg – Munich)			Five train pairs
ICE/TGV 84	Frankfurt – Mannheim – Karlsruhe – Baden-Baden – Strasbourg – Mulhouse-Ville – Belfort-Montbéliard – Besançon Franche-Comté – Chalon-sur-Saône – Lyon-Part-Dieu – Avignon – Aix-en-Provence – Marseille-Saint-Charles			One train pair
ECE 85	Frankfurt – Mannheim – Karlsruhe – Baden-Baden – Freiburg – Basel – Lucerne – Bellinzona – Lugano – Chiasso – Monza – Milan			One train pair

=== Regional services ===
In the 2026 timetable, the following regional services stop at the station:

Line	Route	Frequency
RE 1	Karlsruhe – Pforzheim – Mühlacker – Vaihingen (Enz) – Stuttgart – Schorndorf – Aalen	Hourly (Stuttgart – Aalen: every two hours)
RE 2	Schwarzwaldbahn; Karlsruhe – Baden-Baden – Achern – Offenburg – Villingen – Singen – Konstanz (– Kreuzlingen)	Hourly
RE 4	Südwest- Express (SÜWEX); Karlsruhe – Germersheim – Speyer – Ludwigshafen – Frankenthal – Worms – Mainz – Frankfurt	Every two hours
RE 6	Neustadt (Weinstr) – Landau (Pfalz) – Wörth (Rhein) – Karlsruhe	Hourly
RE 40	Karlsruhe – Rastatt – Gaggenau – Gernsbach – Forbach – Freudenstadt	Every two hours
RE 45	Karlsruhe – Bretten – Eppingen – Schwaigern – Heilbronn	Hourly
RE 73	Karlsruhe – Karlsruhe-Durlach – Bruchsal – Heidelberg	Hourly
RB 41	Karlsruhe – Ettlingen West – Rastatt – Gernsbach – Forbach (some trains: Freudenstadt – Bondorf – Herrenberg)	Hourly, Mon-Fri only
RB 44	Karlsruhe – Ettlingen West – Rastatt (some trains: Baden-Baden – Achern)	Hourly
RB 51	Karlsruhe – Wörth – Kandel – Landau – Edenkoben – Neustadt	Hourly

=== Rhine-Neckar S-Bahn service ===
Karlsruhe Huaptbahnhof is start and end station of Rhine-Neckar S-Bahn line S3 service on the Karlsruhe–Bruchsal–Heidelberg–Mannheim– Ludwigshafen–Speyer–Germersheim route. In the 2026 timetable, the following S-Bahn services stops at the station:

Line	Route	Frequency
S3	Karlsruhe Hbf – KA-Durlach – Bruchsal – Heidelberg – Mannheim – Ludwigshafen (Rhein) – Schifferstadt – Speyer – Germersheim	Hourly, peak hours: 30 minute intervals

=== Karlsruhe Stadtbahn services ===
Karlsruhe station is a hub for S-Bahn train services of the Karlsruhe Stadtbahn of the Albtal-Verkehrs-Gesellschaft. Most of the Karlsruhe Stadtbahn services, however, use platforms A to D on the station forecourt (officially: Bahnhofplatz), which is shared with urban trams and buses.

Line	Route	Frequency
S 1	Linkenheim-Hochstetten – Eggenstein-Leopoldshafen – KA-Neureut – Karlsruhe Marktplatz – Karlsruhe Bahnhofsvorplatz – KA-Rüppurr – Ettlingen – Waldbronn-Busenbach – Bad Herrenalb	Between Ettlingen and Neureut at 10-minute intervals (weekdays), otherwise 20-minute intervals
S 11	Linkenheim-Hochstetten – Eggenstein-Leopoldshafen – KA-Neureut – Karlsruhe Marktplatz – Karlsruhe Bahnhofsvorplatz – KA-Rüppurr – Ettlingen – Waldbronn-Busenbach – Karlsbad-Langensteinbach – Karlsbad-Ittersbach	Between Ettlingen and Neureut at minute intervals (weekdays), otherwise 20-minute intervals
S 31	(Eutingen im Gäu –) Freudenstadt – Baiersbronn – Forbach (Baden) – Rastatt – Muggensturm – Karlsruhe Hbf – KA-Durlach Bf – Bruchsal – Östringen-Odenheim	20 minute intervals
S 32	Achern – Baden-Baden – Rastatt – Muggensturm – Karlsruhe Hbf – KA-Durlach Bf – Bruchsal – Kraichtal-Menzingen	20 minute intervals
S 4	Achern – Baden-Baden – Rastatt – Durmersheim – Karlsruhe Bahnhofsvorplatz – Karlsruhe Marktplatz – KA-Durlach Bf – Bretten – Eppingen – Heilbronn Bahnhofsvorplatz – Öhringen	3 an hour
S 51	Karlsruhe-Marktplatz – Karlsruhe Bahnhofsvorplatz – Karlsruhe West – Maximiliansau – Wörth – Jockgrim – Rheinzabern – Rülzheim – Bellheim – Germersheim	Hourly
S 7	Achern – Baden-Baden – Rastatt – Durmersheim – Karlsruhe Bahnhofsvorplatz – Karlsruhe Tullastraße/VBK	
S 71	Achern – Baden-Baden – Rastatt – Muggensturm – Karlsruhe	
S 8	(Herrenberg –) Eutingen im Gäu – Freudenstadt – Baiersbronn – Forbach (Baden) – Rastatt – Durmersheim – Karlsruhe Bahnhofsvorplatz – Karlsruhe Tullastraße/VBK	Every 30 mins between Freudenstadt Hbf and Freudenstadtstadt, every 60 mins between Freudenstadt Hbf and Karlsruhe Tullastr., every 120 mins between Eutingen in the Gäu and Freudenstadt Hbf, a single journey from/to Herrenberg in the evening
S 81	Karlsruhe Hbf – Rastatt – Gaggenau – Gernsbach – Forbach (Schwarzwald) – Baiersbronn – Freudenstadt Stadt – Freudenstadt Hbf	Every 120 minutes, express service

== See also ==
- Rail transport in Germany
- Railway stations in Germany
