= Karlsruhe-Mühlburg station =

Railway station in Karlsruhe, Germany

Karlsruhe Mühlburg
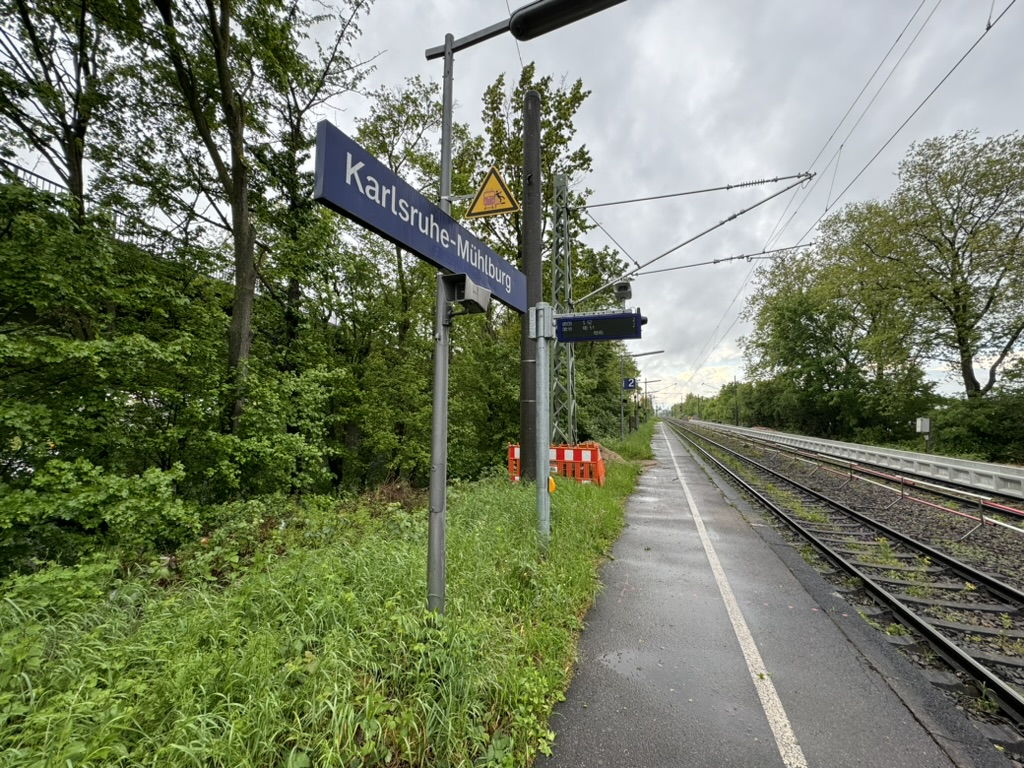
- 2024

General information
- Location: Am Mühlburger Bahnhof 1; 76185 Karlsruhe; Baden-Württemberg; Germany
- Coordinates: 49.002408531°N 8.3626245730°E
- Owner: Deutsche Bahn
- Operator: DB Netz; DB Station&Service
- Lines: Winden–Karlsruhe (KBS 676)
- Platforms: 2 side platforms
- Tracks: 2
- Train operators: DB Regio Mitte; Karlsruhe Stadtbahn
- Connections: 3 5 S 2 S 5 S 51 at Lameyplatz station

Construction
- Parking: yes
- Cycle facilities: yes
- Accessible: yes

Other information
- Fare zone: KVV: 100
- Website: www.bahnhof.de

Services
Preceding station	DB Regio Mitte	Following station
Karlsruhe-Knielingen towards Neustadt (Weinstraße) Hbf	RE 6 Limited service	Karlsruhe West towards Karlsruhe Hbf
Wörth (Rhein) One-way operation	RE 55 Limited service	Karlsruhe West towards Karlsruhe Hbf
Karlsruhe-Knielingen towards Annweiler am Trifels or Neustadt (Weinstraße) Hbf	RB 51	Karlsruhe West towards Karlsruhe Hbf
Wörth (Rhein) towards Lauterbourg	RB 52 Limited service	Karlsruhe West One-way operation
Karlsruhe-Knielingen towards Bad Bergzabern	RB 54 Limited service	Karlsruhe Hbf One-way operation
Preceding station	Karlsruhe Stadtbahn	Following station
Karlsruhe-Knielingen towards Germersheim	S 52	Karlsruhe West towards Karlsruhe Marktplatz
Location

Karlsruhe West station is a railway station in the Mühlburg district in the municipality of Karlsruhe, located in Baden-Württemberg, Germany.
