= Karlsruhe-Durlach station =

Second-largest station in Karlsruhe, Germany

Karlsruhe Durlach
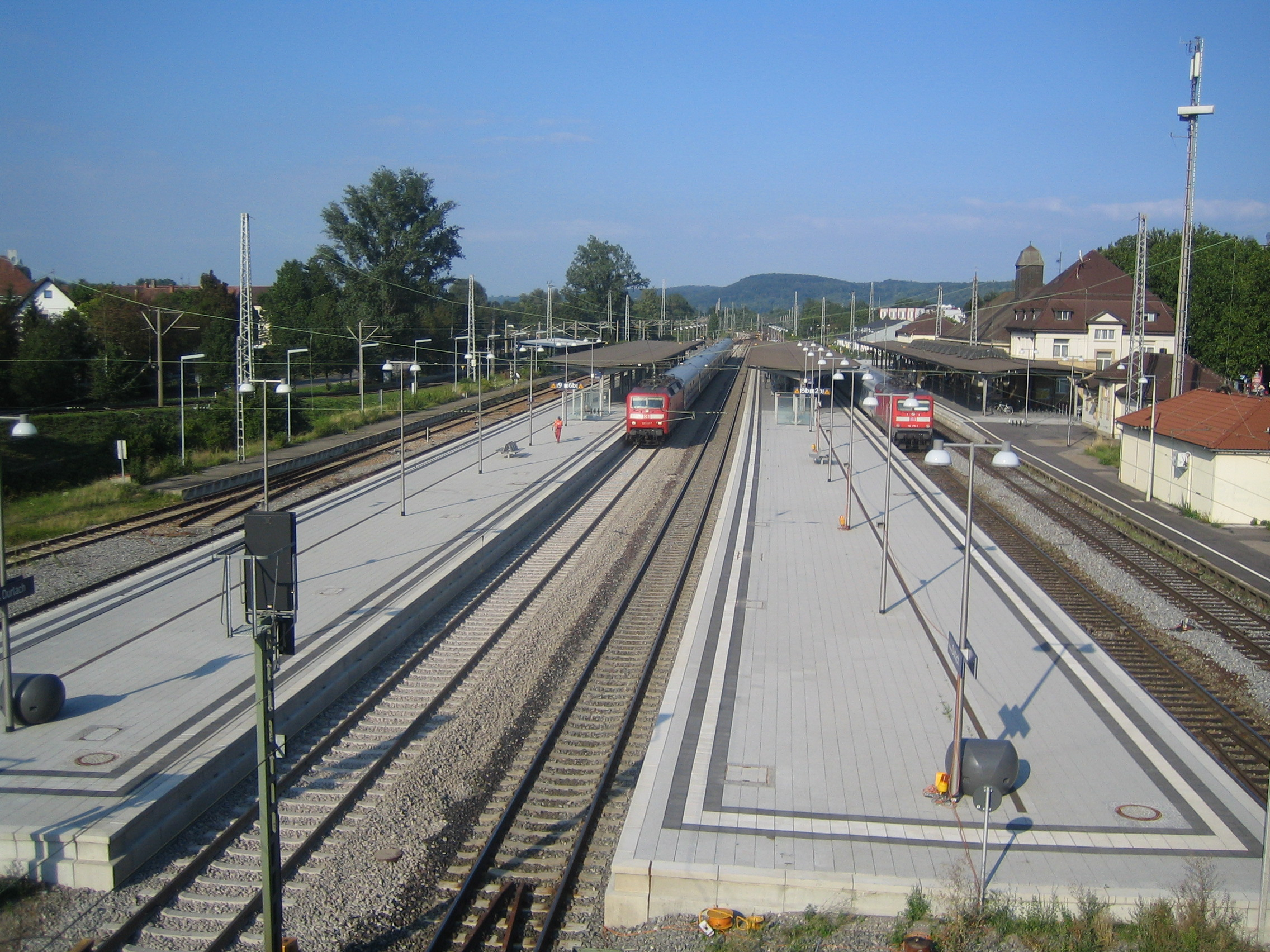
- The station seen from the southwest

General information
- Location: Karlsruhe, Baden-Württemberg; Germany
- Coordinates: 49°00′07″N 8°27′45″E
- Lines: Karlsruhe–Mühlacker railway; Rhine Valley Railway
- Platforms: 5 railway; 2 Stadtbahn; 2 tramway
- Connections: Trams 1 2 at Auer Straße / Dr. Schwabe station

Construction
- Accessible: Yes

Other information
- Station code: 3109
- DS100 code: RKDU
- IBNR: 8003184
- Category: 3
- Fare zone: KVV: 100
- Website: www.bahnhof.de

History
- Opened: 1843 Old station; 1911 Current station

Services
Preceding station		Following station
Karlsruhe Hbf Terminus	RE 1	Wilferdingen-Singen towards Aalen Hbf
Preceding station	DB Regio Mitte	Following station
Karlsruhe Hbf Terminus	RE 45	Jöhlingen West towards Heilbronn Hbf
Karlsruhe Hbf Terminus	RE 73	Bruchsal towards Heidelberg Hbf
Preceding station	(Stuttgart)	Following station
Karlsruhe Hbf Terminus	MEX 17a	Wilferdingen-Singen towards Stuttgart Hbf
Preceding station	Rhine-Neckar S-Bahn	Following station
Karlsruhe Hbf towards Germersheim	S3	Weingarten (Baden) towards Germersheim
Preceding station	Albtal-Verkehrs-Gesellschaft	Following station
Karlsruhe Hbf towards Bad Herrenalb	FEX Freizeitexpress (Su only)	Weingarten (Baden) towards Menzingen (Baden) or Odenheim
Preceding station	Karlsruhe Stadtbahn	Following station
Durlach Untermühlstraße towards Karlsruhe Albtalbahnhof	S 4	Grötzingen towards Öhringen-Cappel
Durlach Untermühlstraße towards Wörth Badepark	S 5	Durlach Hubstraße towards Pforzheim Hbf
Durlach Untermühlstraße towards Germersheim	S 51	Durlach Hubstraße towards Söllingen or Pforzheim Hbf
Karlsruhe Hbf Terminus	S 31	Weingarten (Baden) towards Odenheim
Karlsruhe Hbf Terminus	S 32	Weingarten (Baden) towards Menzingen (Baden)
Preceding station	Karlsruhe tram	Following station
Durlach Untermühlstraße towards Karlsruhe Rheinhafen	5	Terminus
Location

Karlsruhe-Durlach station is the second-largest station in the city of Karlsruhe in the German state of Baden-Württemberg after Karlsruhe Hauptbahnhof. It is used by services of the Karlsruhe Stadtbahn and the Rhine-Neckar S-Bahn and regular regional services.

== History ==
=== Old station ===
The original Durlach station was opened in the then independent community of Durlach along with the Heidelberg–Karlsruhe section of the Rhine Valley Railway, opened on 10 April 1843 by the Grand Duchy of Baden State Railway (German: Großherzogliche Badische Staatsbahn). The old station was east of the current station. After the opening of the new Durlach station in 1911, the old station lost its importance and it was closed in 1913. Its freight yard, which was south of the station still existed in 1990, but its site had been built over by 2000. The Rhine Valley Railway was originally built as a 1,600 mm (5 ft 3 in) line. Along with the other lines of the Baden State Railways, it was converted to standard gauge in 1854. In 1859 the line to Mühlacker was opened.

=== New station ===
The new Durlach station was opened on 9 December 1911 and required a slightly different route for the Mühlacker line to reach it. The building of the station primarily served to eliminate a bottleneck between Durlach and Karlsruhe Hauptbahnhof, caused by the need for trains from Mühlacker to cross the tracks of the Rhine Valley Railway to reach the station.

In 1992, a two-track Karlsruhe Stadtbahn line was built on the northwest side of the station, which branches off Durlacher Allee to Durlach station and then crosses a bridge over the Rhine Valley line to connect with the Karlsruhe–Mühlacker line. The Stadtbahn stop is built parallel with the main line station with two side platforms and is served by lines S4 and S5. All the platforms are connected by a passenger subway.

In 2003 and 2005 the platforms of Durlach station were completely renovated for €4.5 million, as part of a project of the Rhine-Neckar S-Bahn and the Albtal-Verkehrs-Gesellschaft to make the station accessible for the disabled. This involved raising the main line platform edges to 76 cm. The platforms at the Stadtbahn stop were maintained at their original height of 55 cm, as it was not part of the Rhine-Neckar S-Bahn project.

== Operations ==
Line	Route	Frequency
RE 1	Karlsruhe – Karlsruhe-Durlach – Pforzheim – Mühlacker – Vaihingen (Enz) – Stuttgart (– Schorndorf – Aalen)	60 min
RE 45	Karlsruhe Hbf – Karlsruhe-Durlach – Bretten – Eppingen – Schwaigern – Heilbronn	60 min
RE 73	Karlsruhe Hbf – Karlsruhe-Durlach – Bruchsal – Heidelberg	60 min
MEX 17a	(Karlsruhe Hbf – Karlsruhe-Durlach –) Pforzheim – Mühlacker – Vaihingen (Enz) – Stuttgart	Some trains in the peak

=== Rhine-Neckar S-Bahn ===
Line	Route
S3	Germersheim – Speyer – Ludwigshafen (Rhein) – Mannheim – Heidelberg – Wiesloch-Walldorf – Bruchsal – Karlsruhe-Durlach – Karlsruhe

=== Karlsruhe Stadtbahn ===
Line	Route
S 31	(Eutingen (Gäu) –) Freudenstadt – Baiersbronn – Forbach (Schwarzw) – Rastatt – Muggensturm – Karlsruhe – Karlsruhe-Durlach – Bruchsal – Odenheim
S 32	Achern – Baden-Baden – Rastatt – Muggensturm – Karlsruhe – Karlsruhe-Durlach – Bruchsal – Menzingen (Baden)
S 4	Achern – Baden-Baden – Rastatt – Durmersheim – Karlsruhe Bahnhofsvorplatz – Karlsruhe Marktplatz – Karlsruhe-Durlach – Bretten – Eppingen – Heilbronn Bahnhofsvorplatz – Öhringen
S 5	Bietigheim-Bissingen – Vaihingen – Mühlacker – Pforzheim – Karlsruhe-Durlach – Karlsruhe Entenfang – Karlsruhe-Knielingen

=== Trams ===
The tram stop is located some 150 metres from the railway station on Durlacher Allee and is called Auer Straße.

Line	Route
1	Durlach – Auer Straße – Tullastraße – Durlacher Tor – Marktplatz – Europaplatz – Schillerstraße – Weinbrennerplatz – Europhalle – Oberreut Badeniaplatz
2	Wolfartsweier – Aue – Auer Straße – Tullastraße – Durlacher Tor – Marktplatz – Europaplatz – Hauptbahnhof – Tivoli
