= Karlsruhe Albtalbahnhof =

Railway station in Karlsruhe, Germany

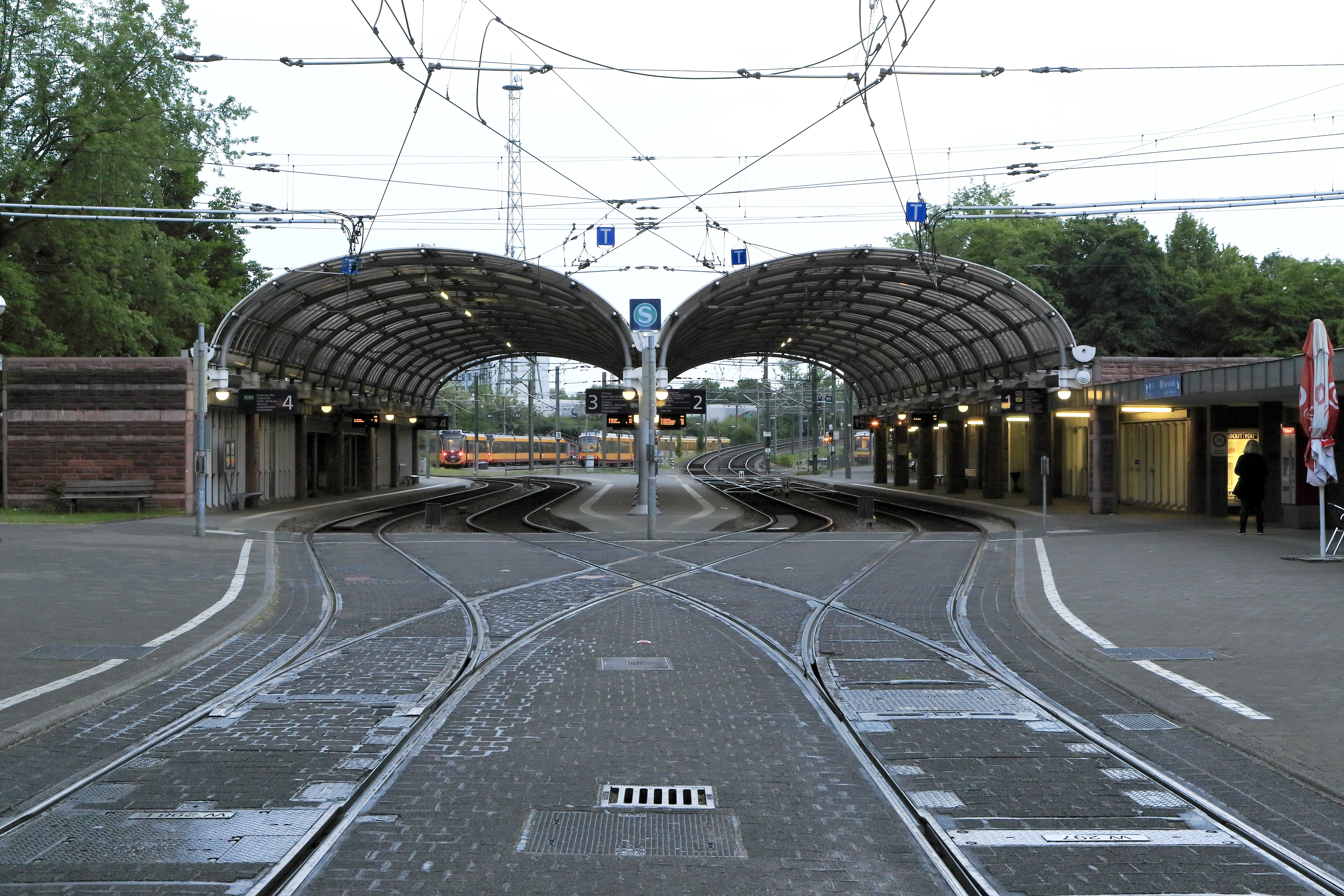
- 2018

General information
- Coordinates: 48°59′37″N 8°23′46″W
- Operator: Albtal-Verkehrs-Gesellschaft (AVG)
- Transit authority: Karlsruher Verkehrsverbund (KVV)
- Tracks: 4
- Train operators: Albtal-Verkehrs-Gesellschaft (AVG)
- Connections: 2 3 at Ebertstraße tram stop

Other information
- Station code: RKAB

History
- Opened: 1 December 1897
- Rebuilt: 22 March 1915
- Former names: Karlsruhe Albtalbahn, Karlsruhe Messplatz
- Original company: Badische Lokal-Eisenbahnen AG (BLEAG)

Services
Preceding station	Karlsruhe Stadtbahn	Following station
Karlsruhe Hbf towards Hochstetten	S 1	Karlsruhe Dammerstock towards Bad Herrenalb
Karlsruhe Hbf towards Hochstetten	S 11	Karlsruhe Dammerstock towards Ittersbach
Karlsruhe Ebertstraße towards Rheinhafen	S 12	Ettlingen Wasen towards Ittersbach
Karlsruhe Hbf towards Karlsruhe Albtalbahnhof	S 4	Terminus
Karlsruhe Hbf towards Pforzheim Hbf	S 5	Terminus
Karlsruhe Hbf towards Karlsruhe Tullastraße / Alter Schlachthof	S 7	Forchheim (b Karlsruhe) towards Achern
Karlsruhe Hbf towards Karlsruhe Tullastraße / Alter Schlachthof	S 8	Forchheim (b Karlsruhe) towards Bondorf (b Herrenberg)
Karlsruhe Hbf towards Germersheim	S 51	Terminus
Karlsruhe Hbf towards Karlsruhe Marktplatz	S 52	Karlsruhe West towards Germersheim
Location

Karlsruhe Albtalbahnhof is a railway station in Karlsruhe, Germany, next to Karlsruhe main station. The station is of particular importance for the city, as it is the station where tram-trains cross from the city's tram network to the regional and long-distance rail network. The station is the starting station of the Alb Valley Railway (Albtalbahn), after which it was named. It is operated and managed by Albtal-Verkehrs-Gesellschaft (AVG).

== History ==
In the 1880s, plans were made for a local railway line that would connect Karlsruhe with Ettlingen and the Alb valley. A meter-gauge line from Karlsruhe to Ettlingen opened on December 1, 1897, with extensions to Herrenalb and Ittersbach following in 1898 and 1899. The local railway line was operated by the Badische Lokal-Eisenbahnen AG (BLEAG). Originally, the Albtalbahnhof terminus of 1897 was located on Ettlinger Straße at the intersection with Nowackanlage and Messplatz, where the Kongresszentrum underground tram stop is today. That is south of where the Karlsruhe main station was originally located, which was at Ettlinger Tor.

In 1900, it was decided to move Karlsruhe main station to its present location (completed in 1913), which would involve a major rebuilding and rerouting of all railway lines in the Karlsruhe area, including BLEAG's Alb Valley line. In preparation for the move, the original Albtalbahnhof station closed on 7 April 1910. After two temporary stations, the Albtalbahnhof reopened at its present location on 22 March 1915.

Since the station was now further from the city centre than before, reduced interchange fares were offered with Karlsruhe municipal trams. Finding a better solution of some form was always pursued by BLEAG and its successor companies, as well as by the city of Karlsruhe.

On 1 April 1957, the municipal Albtal-Verkehrs-Gesellschaft (AVG) took over the Alb Valley line from its previous owner, Deutsche Eisenbahn-Betriebs-Gesellschaft. On 18 April 1958, the conversion of the tracks from meter-gauge to standard gauge for the first section from Karlsruhe Albtalbahnhof to Rüppurr completed, with more sections following in subsequent months. At the same time, the tracks at Albtalbahnhof were connected with the municipal trams, and a through-running tram-train service A was introduced from the Alb Valley to Karlsruhe city centre, the precursor of today's S1 and S11 lines.

In 1988, a station hall spanning the tracks was built.

In the mid-1990s, a big stabling yard at Albtalbahnhof and a connecting curve between to the railway line connecting Karlsruhe to Rastatt via Durmersheim were built. On 14 December 1996, a through tram-train line S4 was introduced from Bretten via Karlsruhe city centre and Rastatt to Baden-Baden.

On 1 July 2015, the technical operating rules inside the station were changed from railway rules (Eisenbahn-Bau- und Betriebsordnung, EBO) to tramway rules (Straßenbahn-Bau- und Betriebsordnung, BOStrab), the limit between the two rulesets are now the southern signals of Albtalbahnhof.

== Services ==
The station is served by several Karlsruhe Stadtbahn tram-train lines of the Albtal-Verkehrs-Gesellschaft.

Line	Route	Frequency
S 1	Linkenheim-Hochstetten – Eggenstein-Leopoldshafen – KA-Neureut – Karlsruhe Marktplatz (Pyramide U) – Hbf Vorplatz – Albtalbahnhof – KA-Rüppurr – Ettlingen – Waldbronn-Busenbach – Bad Herrenalb	Between Ettlingen and Neureut at 10 minute intervals (weekdays), otherwise 20 to 30 minute intervals
S 11	Linkenheim-Hochstetten – Eggenstein-Leopoldshafen – KA-Neureut – Karlsruhe Marktplatz (Pyramide U) – Hbf Vorplatz – Albtalbahnhof – KA-Rüppurr – Ettlingen – Waldbronn-Busenbach – Karlsbad-Langensteinbach – Karlsbad-Ittersbach	Between Ettlingen and Neureut at 10 minute intervals (weekdays), otherwise 20 to 30 minute intervals
S 12	Karlsruhe Rheinhafen – Entenfang – Europaplatz – Karlstor – Albtalbahnhof – Rüppurr – Ettlingen Stadt – Ettlingen Albgaubad – Busenbach – Reichenbach – Langensteinbach – Ittersbach	30 minute interval during rush hour only (express)
S 4	Albtalbahnhof – Karlsruhe Marktplatz (Pyramide U) – Karlsruhe-Durlach – Bretten – Flehingen – Eppingen – Heilbronn Bahnhofsvorplatz – Öhringen	Two trains per hour to Flehingen, one continuing to Heilbronn/Öhringen
S 5	Albtalbahnhof – Hbf Vorplatz – Marktplatz (Pyramide U) – Tullastraße/Alter Schlachthof – Durlach Bf – Grötzingen – Söllingen – Wilferdingen-Singen – Pforzheim Hbf	single trips during rush hour only (express)
S 51	Albtalbahnhof – Hbf Vorplatz – Marktplatz (Pyramide U) – Knielingen – Maximiliansau – Wörth – Jockgrim – Rheinzabern – Rülzheim – Bellheim – Germersheim	single trips only
S 52	Karlsruhe Marktplatz (Pyramide U) – Hbf Vorplatz – Albtalbahnhof – Wörth – Germersheim	60 minute interval during rush hour only
S 7	Achern – Baden-Baden – Rastatt – Durmersheim – Albtalbahnhof – Hbf Vorplatz – Marktplatz (Pyramide U) – Karlsruhe Tullastraße/Alter Schlachthof	60 minute interval
S 8	Bondorf (b Herrenberg) – Eutingen im Gäu – Freudenstadt – Baiersbronn – Forbach (Schwarzwald) – Rastatt – Durmersheim – Albtalbahnhof – Hbf Vorplatz – Marktplatz (Pyramide U) – Karlsruhe Tullastraße/Alter Schlachthof	60 minute interval to Freudenstadt, every other train continuing to Bondorf
