= Lein (Neckar) =

River in Germany

Location
- Country: Germany
- State: Baden-Württemberg

Physical characteristics
- Mouth
  - location: Neckar
  - coordinates: 49.1671°N 9.2054°E
- Length: 27.5 km (17.1 mi)

Basin features
- Progression: Neckar→ Rhine→ North Sea

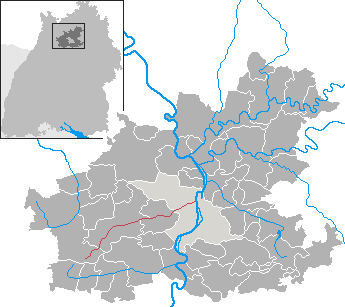
Map of the course of the river Lein (in red) in the Landkreis (district) Heilbronn, Baden-Württemberg, Germany.

Lein is a river of Baden-Württemberg, Germany. It is a left tributary of the Neckar near Heilbronn.

== See also ==
- List of rivers of Baden-Württemberg
