= Rheinisches Landestheater Neuss =

Theatre in Neuss, North Rhine-Westphalia, Germany

Coordinates: 51°11′48″N 6°41′44″E

Rheinisches Landestheater Neuss is a theatre in Neuss, North Rhine-Westphalia, Germany.
