= Bretten station =

Railway station in Germany

Bretten
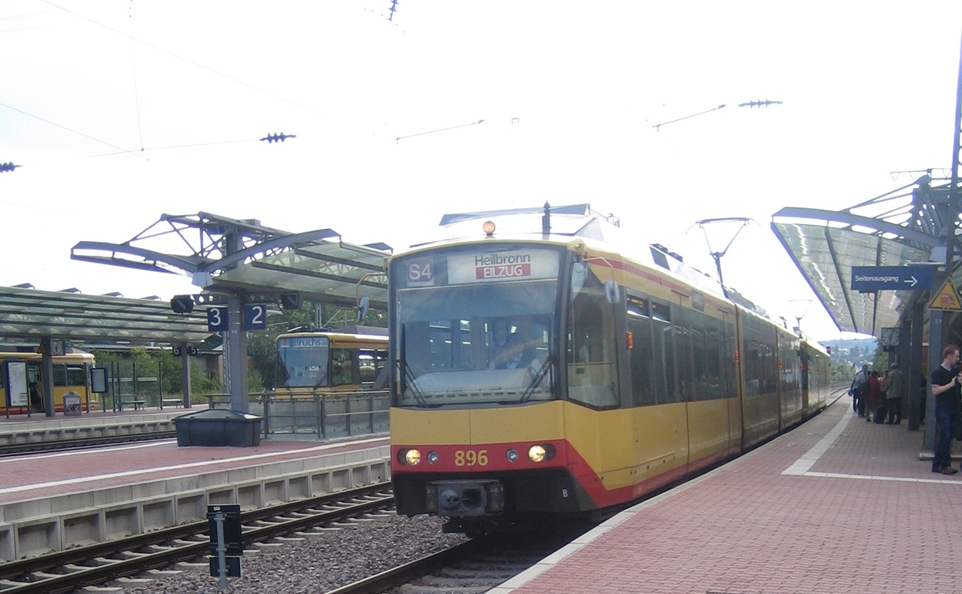
- Line S4 towards Heilbronn

General information
- Location: Bahnhofstr. 15 75015 Bretten, Baden-Württemberg; Germany
- Coordinates: 49°2′13″N 8°41′35″E
- Lines: Bruchsal–Bietigheim-Bissingen (KBS 710.9/770) S 9; Kraichgau Railway (KBS 710.4) S 4
- Platforms: 5

Construction
- Accessible: No (except platform 1)

Other information
- Station code: 875
- DS100 code: RBT
- IBNR: 8000053
- Category: 4
- Fare zone: KVV: 258; HNV: 602 (KVV transitional tariff, season and select daily passes only); VPE: 48 (KVV transitional tariff)
- Website: www.bahnhof.de

History
- Opened: 1 October 1853

Services
Preceding station	(Stuttgart)	Following station
Diedelsheim towards Bruchsal	RB 17c	Bretten Rechberg towards Mühlacker
Diedelsheim towards Bruchsal	MEX 17c	Bretten Rechberg towards Stuttgart Hbf
Bruchsal towards Heidelberg Hbf	RE 71	Mühlacker Terminus
Preceding station	DB Regio Mitte	Following station
Wössingen Ost towards Karlsruhe Hbf	RE 45	Bretten Stadtmitte towards Heilbronn Hbf
Preceding station	Karlsruhe Stadtbahn	Following station
Bretten-Rinklingen towards Karlsruhe Albtalbahnhof	S 4	Bretten Stadtmitte towards Öhringen-Cappel
Location

Bretten station is the centre of rail transport in the town of Bretten in the German state of Baden-Württemberg. The Württemberg Western Railway and the Kraichgau line cross at the station.

== History ==
Bretten station was opened on 1 October 1853 as part of the construction of Western Railway from Stuttgart to Bruchsal. In the late 1870s, the Kraichgau Railway was opened from Karlsruhe to Heilbronn, creating a railway junction. At the same time the station was moved from near the town centre to its present location at the junction to the west of the town centre.

The Western Railway through Bretten station was electrified in the 1950s. When Karlsruhe Stadtbahn services opened on the Kraichgau Railway to Bretten-Gölshausen on 25 September 1992, along with the electrification of the Kraichgau Railway, this first two-system light railway (tram-train) line was called line B. In May 1994, Stadtbahn line S9 opened from Bruchsal to Bretten and it was extended to Mühlacker in 1999. In 1994, line B was renamed line S4.

In the summer of 2000 the station was modernised. Among other things, the platforms were raised, waiting rooms were enlarged and a toilet was built. Between 2002 and 2004, with the opening of Stadtbahn operations on the Murg Valley Railway, services were extended to Freudenstadt, but through services were discontinued at the end of 2004 due to the route's high susceptibility to delays. In addition Regional-Express trains operate from Heidelberg to Stuttgart, stopping in Bretten, as does the so-called "Kraichgau Sprinter", which runs twice daily between Heilbronn and Karlsruhe with few stops.

In the station forecourt, there is a bus station served by bus lines 141, 143, 144, 145 and 146, connecting to Bretten and its immediate surroundings.
