= Badische Landesbühne =

Coordinates: 49.12409°N 8.59950°E

Badische Landesbühne is a theatre in Bruchsal, Baden-Württemberg, Germany.
