= An-Najah National University =

University in Nablus, West Bank, Palestine

Coordinates: 32°13′13.34″N 35°14′40.09″E

- جامعة النجاح الوطنية
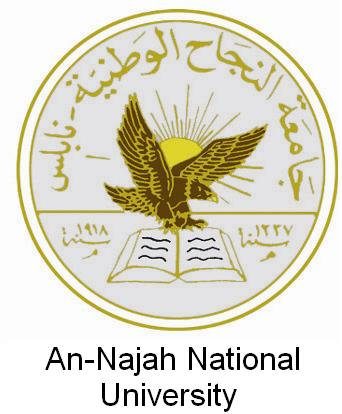
- Type: Public
- Established: 1918 (school); 1977 (university)
- President: Maher An-Natsheh
- Location: Omar Ibn Al-Khattab St., PO Box 7, Nablus, Nablus, West Bank, Palestine
- Website: najah.edu

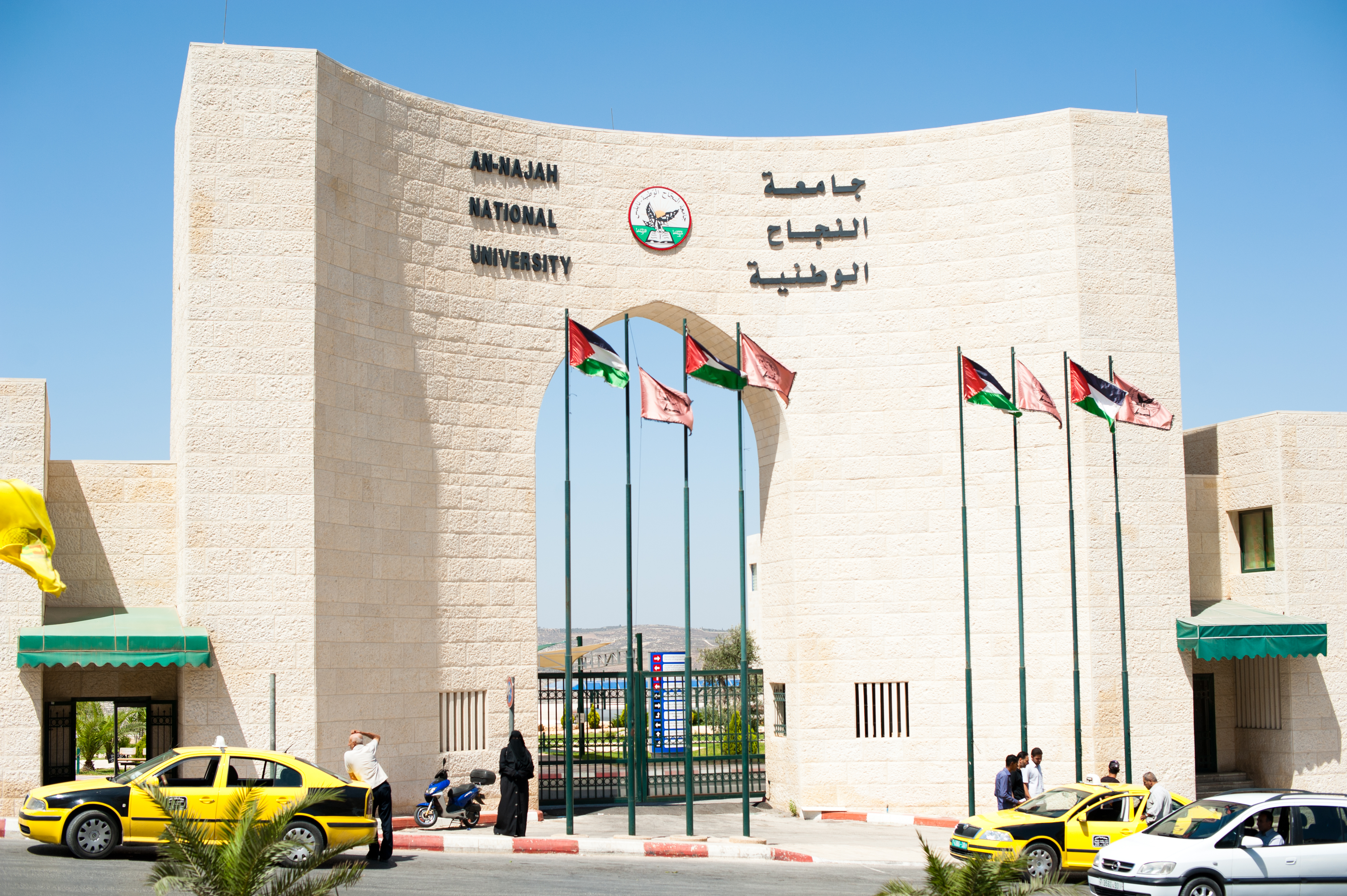
Entrance to the campus

An-Najah National University (Arabic: جامعة النجاح الوطنية) is a non-governmental public university governed by a board of trustees in Nablus, West Bank, Palestine. The university has 22,000 students and 300 professors in 19 faculties. It is the largest university in the State of Palestine.

== Manifesto ==
It was chartered as a full-fledged university in 1977.

== Timeline ==
- 1918: Established as a primary school (An-Najah Nabulsi School) educating students, both local and from abroad.
- 1941: The institution was named An-Najah College.
- 1965: Became a teacher preparation institute, also granting intermediate university degrees.
- 1977: Evolved into a full-fledged university, An-Najah National University with a Faculty of Arts and a Faculty of Sciences and joined the Association of Arab Universities (AARU) as a full member.
- 1978: Faculties of Economics, Administrative Sciences, Educational Sciences and Engineering were inaugurated.
- 1981: First master's degree Program was established in curricula management at the Faculty of Educational Sciences and An-Najah was accepted as a member in the World Union of Universities.
- 1984: Closed for 4 months by the Israeli army
- 1985: Expanded the scope of higher studies to include new fields including Chemistry, Islamic Studies and Education.
- 1994: Faculty of Pharmacy was established; new faculties and specialized scientific centers were introduced, including the Academic Program for the Study of Involuntary Migration (APSIM); the Water and Environmental Studies Institute; the Center for Studies, Consultation and Technical Services; and the Business and Technology Incubator.
- 1995: Faculty of Law was established.
- 1997: Signed an agreement with the director-general of the UNESCO to establish the UNESCO Chair on Human Rights and Democracy. In the same year, the university launched the Arabic for Non-Native Speakers Program.
- 1998: Board of trustees decided to establish the Center for Urban and Regional Planning (CURP).
- 1999: Faculty of Medicine was established in cooperation with Al-Quds and Al-Azhar universities. In the same year, the Community Service Center was also established serving the local community.
- 2000: On 25 June 2000, Yasser Arafat laid the foundation stone for Munib Masri's College for Engineering and Technology at the New Campus. In the same year, the Faculty of Veterinary Medicine and a number of scientific majors including Computer Engineering, Statistics, and Economy and Agricultural Development were established.
- 2001: Established the Faculty of Information Technology. Construction of the Hisham Hijjawi College of Technology was completed and the college welcomed its first students in October.
- 2003: Launched the "Voice of An-Najah" radio station helping to strengthen ties with the local community and to provide reliable information. The Opinion Polls and Survey Studies Center, the Continuing Education Center (CEC) and the Measurement and Evaluation Center (MEC) were also established.
- 2004: Faculty of Optometry and the Faculty of Nursing established.
- 2005:
  - Established Al-Qasem Palace in Beit Wazan to serve as a Center for Urban and Regional Planning.
  - Established the Faculty of Honors and a Unit for Architectural Conservation and Reconstruction.
  - Launched the An-Najah Award for Scientific Research in the field of science and humanities.
  - Established two scientific masters programs: Animal Husbandry and Clean Energy and Consumption Rationalization.
- 2006:
  - Institute of Forensic Medicine was established as a branch of the Faculty of Medicine.
  - An-Najah Alumni Association was established
  - His Excellency, Mahmoud Abbas, President of the Palestinian National Authority inaugurated the university's new campus. President Abbas was presented with an Honorary Doctorate in Law.
  - Awarded the Hisham Adib Hijjawi Award in Energy and Industry for the ninth time.
- 2007: The university inaugurated the following:
  - Languages Center.
  - Computer Lab for the Visually-Impaired.
  - Dental Clinic.
  - Prosthetics Clinic on the Old Campus.
  - Korean-Palestinian IT Institute of Excellence
  - Eye Clinic of the Faculty of Optometry.
- 2008:
  - Faculty of Medicine was accredited as an independent faculty by the Palestinian Ministry of Education and Higher Education.
  - Acquired the hospitals of Al-Zakat Committee in Nablus. The hospital buildings will be developed into a teaching hospital for students of medicine and nursing; the hospital will serve the entire northern West Bank region in cooperation with the Palestinian Ministry of Health.
  - Mosque inaugurated in August 2008.
  - Sports Complex inaugurated at the new campus in November 2008.

== Student body ==
Most of the students are Palestinian, but there are also students and professors from all over the world. Languages spoken on campus include Arabic, Hebrew, English, French, and Spanish.

== Faculty ==
The university president is Rami Hamdallah. The vice-president for academic affairs is Maher Natsheh and the vice-president for administration affairs is Shaker AlBitar.

Ansam Sawalha, who is the dean of the faculty of pharmacy, is the first Palestinian woman named to the Women in Science Hall of Fame in 2011. Sawalha was honored for her achievement of establishing the first Poison Control and Drug Information Center in the Palestinian Territories in 2006.

=== Political conflicts regarding faculty ===
In 2010 six members of the faculty including Ghassan Khaled were arrested by Palestinian Authority security forces for being closely linked to a charity that is suspected of being a front for Hamas. In 2011, Abdel Sattar Qassem, a professor of political science at the university and critic of the Palestinian leadership was arrested by the Palestinian Authority following a complaint by the university president that Qassem had written an article critical of the university administration for refusing to comply with a court order rescinding its decision to expel four students. Qassem had been targeted in the past by Palestinian security forces, and was at one point shot and wounded.

== Courses ==
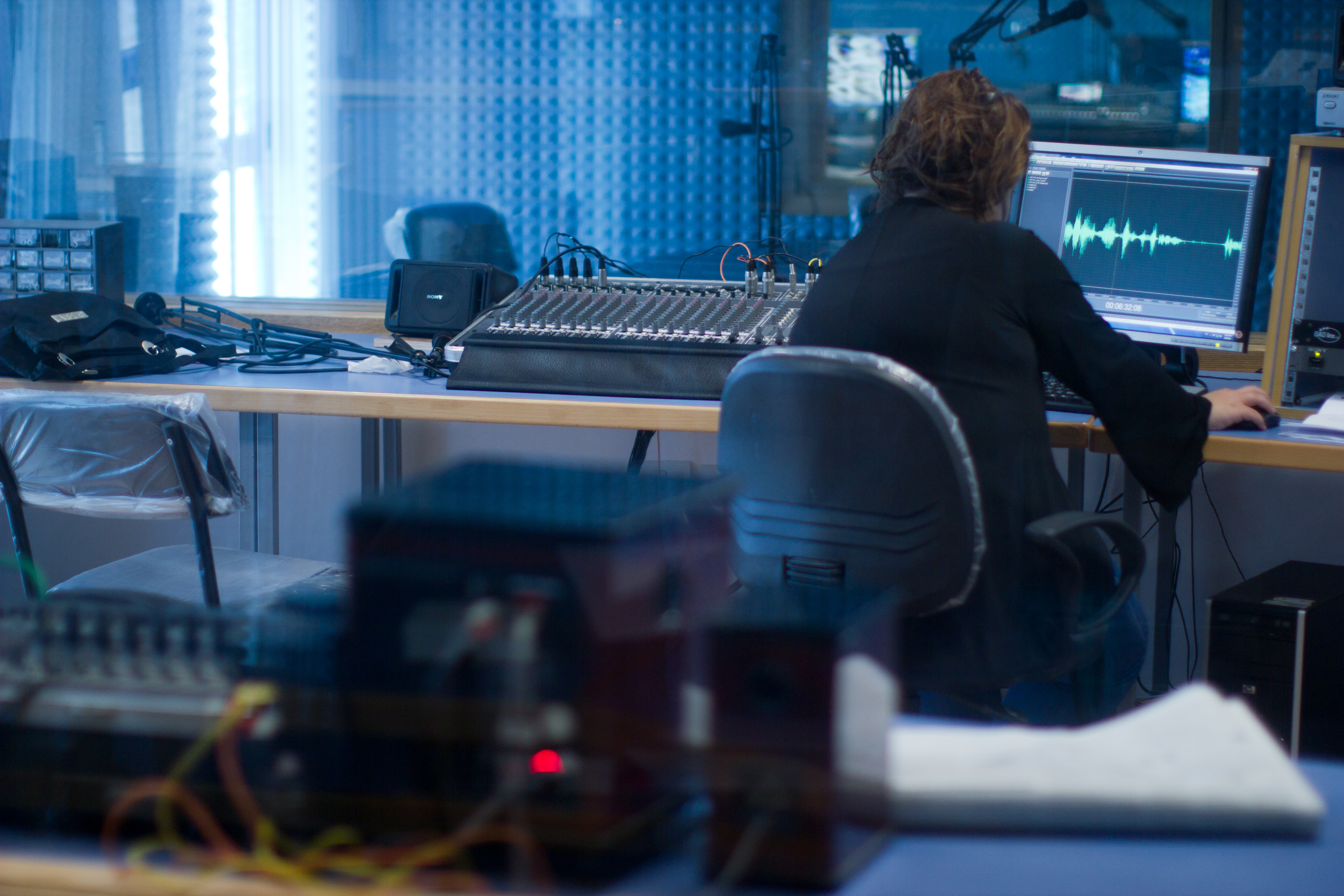
Audio production facility

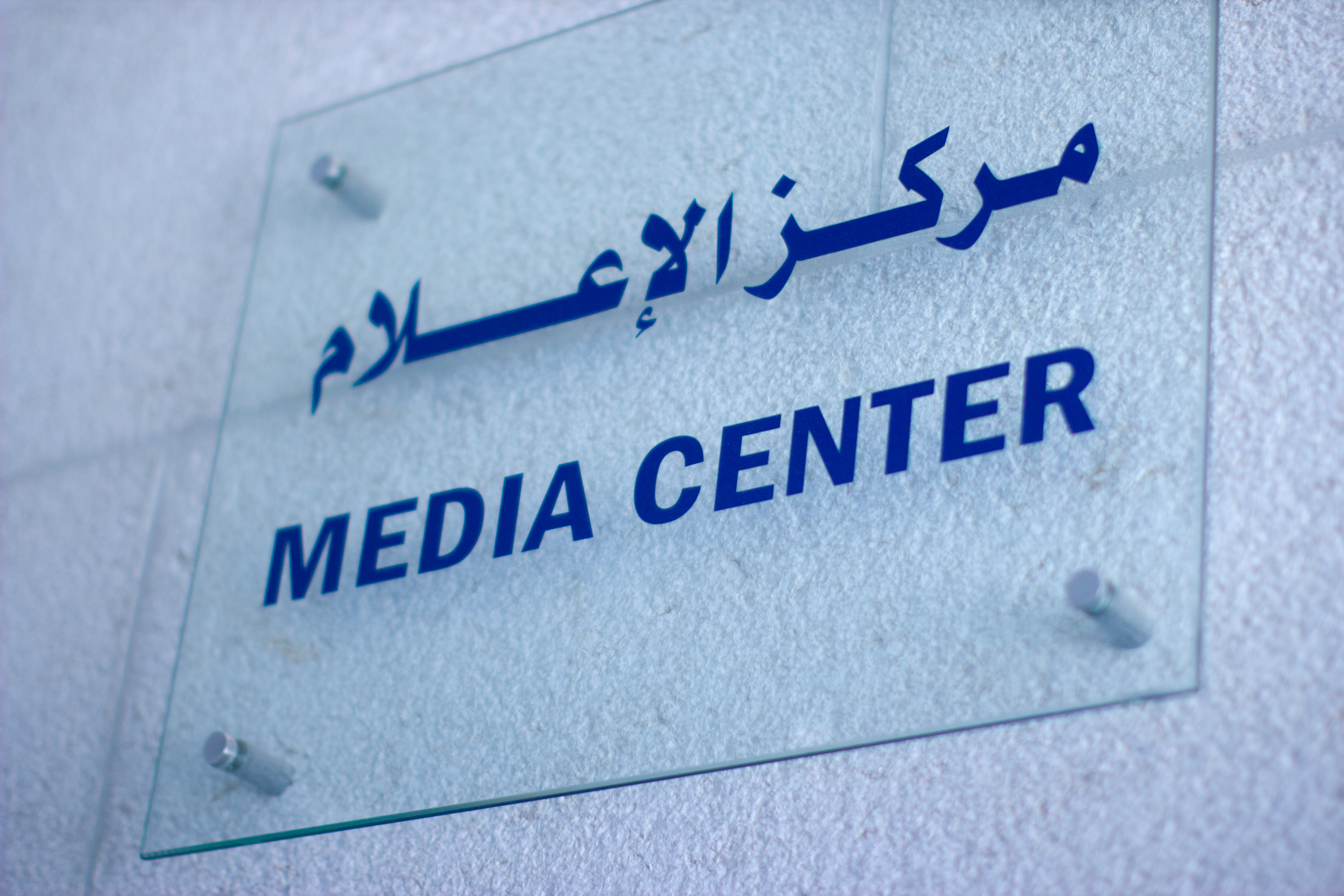
Sign for media center

The university has sixteen scientific faculties and humanities faculties. An-Najah offers undergraduate instruction in the fields of medicine, engineering, humanities, social sciences and the natural sciences, as well as courses of graduate study in humanities and the social sciences.

The scientific faculties include:
- Faculty of Science
- Faculty of Engineering
- Faculty of Information Technology
- Faculty of Agriculture
- Faculty of Human Medicine
- Faculty of Optometry
- Faculty of Pharmacy
- Faculty of Veterinary Medicine
- Faculty of Nursing
- Faculty of Physical Education
The Humanities Faculties include:
- Faculty of Arts
- Faculty of Fine Arts
- Faculty of Islamic Law (Shari'a)
- Faculty of Law
- Faculty of Economics and Administrative Sciences
- Faculty of Educational Sciences
- Faculty of Graduate Studies.

== Cooperation and foreign exchange ==
The university has several partner universities. These account with their exchange students for a significant part of the foreign students at An-Najah. Another number of foreign students are drawn to An-Najah for the courses in Arabic for foreigners offered by the university.

=== Twinnings ===
There is twinning between An-Najah National University and several British student unions:

- University of Essex Students' Union; since 1991
- University of Manchester Students' Union; since 2006, in spite of substantial opposition. A very wide campaign was held in 2007 to either cancel the twinning, or have the An-Najah Union sign a declaration denouncing terrorism, but the campaign was heavily defeated when it came to a vote.
- London School of Economics students' union.

=== Partner universities ===
- Darmstadt University of Applied Sciences, Darmstadt, Germany
- McGill University Middle East Program (MMEP) in Civil Society and Peace Building. Each year, 2500 of An-Najah's undergraduate students participate in volunteer programs run through the MMEP's Community Service Centre in Nablus.

=== West Bank affiliated institutes ===
- Palestine Technical University – Kadoorie, Tulkarm

== See also ==
- List of Islamic educational institutions
- List of universities and colleges in Palestine
- Education in Palestine
