= Pistachio ice cream case =

1993 criminal case in Germany

The Pistachio ice cream case is one of the most puzzling unsolved criminal cases in Germany from the 1990s. On January 21, 1993, seven-year-old Anna B. died from arsenic poisoning—allegedly after eating a serving of pistachio ice cream. Although her aunt was eventually put on trial for the suspected poisoning, the case ended in an acquittal. To this day, the exact circumstances remain unclear. In a highly unusual legal move, Germany's Federal Court of Justice ultimately ruled that the accused’s actions did not constitute a criminal offense.

== Background ==
Elisabeth F. (born around 1954), who would later stand trial for the alleged murder, grew up in Stuttgart with her younger brother, Ernst-Rudolf B. Their parents owned a pharmacy, which they sold after neither child expressed interest in taking over the business. Elisabeth began studying pharmacy but dropped out shortly before her final exams and went on to pursue a career in advertising. She later married a wealthy man and lived a lavish lifestyle: she drove a Porsche, wore expensive clothes, and owned three purebred dogs. Due to complications from lymphoma, she was unable to have children.

Ernst-Rudolf B. married Benedikte B. in 1981, and their only child, Anna, was born in February 1985. Benedikte developed multiple sclerosis during the pregnancy and was using crutches by the time Anna died. The family lived modestly in Tamm-Hohenstange, near Stuttgart, despite Ernst-Rudolf's high-paying management job. Both parents were devout Catholics and raised their daughter with a strong emphasis on self-reliance and discipline. Anna was described as being very close to her parents. Despite differing lifestyles, the relationship between the B. family and Elisabeth F. was warm and supportive. Elisabeth was Anna’s godmother and reportedly intended to make her the sole heir to her estate.

In 1987, both of the siblings’ parents died under somewhat unusual circumstances. Their father collapsed in a Stuttgart parking garage and was believed to have suffered a stroke. Eight months later, their mother died after a sudden drop in blood pressure. Elisabeth F. happened to be in Stuttgart at the time of both deaths, which later led investigators to consider whether she could have been involved. However, F. stated that her father had long suffered from heart disease, liver damage, and diabetes, and that her mother had experienced treatment-resistant seizures for years. After their deaths, Elisabeth and her brother inherited several million Deutschmarks. Elisabeth granted her brother power of attorney to manage their inheritance.

== Events leading up to the death ==
On January 20, 1993, Elisabeth F. visited the B. family at their home near Stuttgart, ostensibly to take one of their dogs to a veterinary appointment in the city the following day. She brought along a 750 ml container of pistachio ice cream, which she had promised to her niece.

That evening, between 5:30 and 6:30 p.m., Anna attended her ballet class. For dinner, she ate a slice of meatloaf and a pretzel roll. Her father returned home around 7:30 p.m., but left again shortly thereafter with his wife to attend a religious lecture. From approximately 7:45 p.m. until 10:00 p.m., Elisabeth was alone in the house with the child.

During that time, Anna took her aunt’s three dogs out for a walk. When she returned, Elisabeth gave her two servings of pistachio ice cream, topped with chocolate sauce from a bottle that was already open and stored in the B. family’s refrigerator. Elisabeth herself also ate a portion of the ice cream but without any sauce.

At around 9:00 p.m., Elisabeth put Anna to bed. An hour later, the child began to vomit. Around that time, Ernst-Rudolf. B. returned home with his wife after picking up a pizza on the way. At about 10:15 p.m., Anna called her father into her room and told him she had vomited because she had eaten "too much ice cream." Her parents gave her black tea and a herbal stomach remedy (Uzara), and she sat with the adults in the living room for a while before being put back to bed around 11:15 p.m. Elisabeth spent the night in the guest room.

Anna’s condition worsened overnight. She vomited up to four times per hour and suffered from stomach cramps and diarrhea. Her father gave her charcoal tablets, and she eventually fell asleep around 5:00 a.m. But at 7:00 a.m., she began showing signs of severe neurological distress—balance problems, confusion, and eventually collapse. Her parents and aunt immediately set out to take her to the pediatrician, whose office was still closed, and then continued to the hospital in Ludwigsburg. During the drive, Elisabeth tried to keep Anna conscious.

After the hospital admitted the child, Elisabeth left to attend the previously scheduled veterinary appointment. She then returned to the B. family’s home, changed clothes, and ran a half-loaded dishwasher that included the bowl from which Anna had eaten the ice cream. Around noon, she returned to the hospital, where her brother informed her that Anna had died. Despite intensive efforts, doctors had been unable to revive the child: her heart began to fail around 11:00 a.m., and she was pronounced dead at 11:32 a.m.

== Police investigation ==
Medical staff at the hospital quickly suspected poisoning, and the poison control center was alerted even before Anna was formally pronounced dead. Police began investigating immediately, but no food was confiscated from the B. family’s home—despite the strong possibility of food poisoning. In fact, Benedikte B. disposed of all the remaining food in the house shortly after the child’s death.

The parents were initially reluctant to allow an autopsy, with the mother strongly opposing it. Eventually, the autopsy was carried out, after which Anna’s body was cremated and buried.

Less than two weeks after Anna’s death, the ice cream manufacturer received a blackmail letter demanding 80,000 Deutschmarks and threatening to poison more of its products. The extortionist, who called himself “Mr. Calva,” contacted the company one more time, but there were no further messages and no money was paid. Authorities considered it unlikely that a financially motivated product extortionist would first poison a product and only later issue a threat, which cast doubt on a connection between the poisoning and the blackmail attempt. Elisabeth F.’s statement that she had eaten the same ice cream herself also seemed to argue against a commercial motive.

Roughly eight weeks after Anna’s death, autopsy results confirmed that she had died from ingesting arsenic trioxide, a tasteless and odorless powder. The dose was 20 to 50 times the lethal amount. Because arsenic typically causes nausea within 90 to 120 minutes, the poison must have been administered after 8:00 p.m.—which ruled out food Anna had eaten earlier in the day. The investigation considered whether the arsenic had been in the ice cream or the chocolate sauce, or whether it had been given later, in the tea or herbal medicine.

At the time of the crime, both Elisabeth F. and Ernst-Rudolf B. still had keys to their parents’ former pharmacy, which had since been sold. The new owner confirmed that two vials of arsenic were still in the old inventory. An old military field medical kit in the B. family home also contained arsenic, but in quantities deemed harmless. All three adults present that night—Anna’s parents and her aunt—were treated as suspects.

Investigators noted that all three appeared emotionally detached and highly controlled. One theory proposed that the poisoning may not have been aimed at Anna herself, but at one of the adults present. However, no clear motive emerged for any of the three.

Elisabeth F. eventually became the main focus of the investigation. Her behavior raised suspicions: despite Anna’s deteriorating condition, she left the hospital to take a dog to the vet; at the funeral, she wore heavy makeup and reportedly made inappropriate comments. Investigators also noted that she had been present during both of her parents’ sudden deaths. Additionally, Anna had fallen ill during a visit from her aunt just two months earlier, in November 1992—potentially a failed earlier poisoning attempt.

Investigators also found it suspicious that Elisabeth ran the dishwasher the morning after Anna’s death, which included the glass bowl the child had used. This was seen as possible evidence tampering, especially since Elisabeth brought up the dishwasher to her brother just as he informed her of Anna’s death.

Despite extensive questioning, Elisabeth F. remained composed. Multiple psychiatric evaluations found no signs of mental illness. Her parents’ cremated remains were later exhumed and tested for arsenic, but no abnormal levels were found, and no charges were filed in connection with their deaths.

== Legal proceedings ==
Prosecutors concluded that Anna B. had been deliberately poisoned with arsenic, most likely by her aunt Elisabeth F., who had served her pistachio ice cream the evening before her death. A possible motive, according to the prosecution, was jealousy: Elisabeth, who was unable to have children due to a medical condition, may have resented her brother’s daughter. As the daughter of pharmacists and a former pharmacy student, Elisabeth also had both access to arsenic and the knowledge required to administer it lethally.

Particular attention was paid to the fact that she had run the dishwasher on the morning of January 21, 1993, thereby potentially removing any traces of arsenic from the bowl in which Anna had eaten her ice cream.

Although it was certain that Anna died from a lethal dose of arsenic, the delivery method remained unclear. It was never conclusively established whether the poison was in the ice cream, the chocolate sauce, or a later drink such as the tea she consumed before bed.

In the weeks after the girl’s death, investigators also explored whether Anna’s parents could have had a motive. It was suggested that Benedikte B., who developed multiple sclerosis during pregnancy, might have suffered from a psychiatric disorder and killed her daughter in a delusional state. Another theory speculated that Ernst-Rudolf B. may have wanted to free himself from family obligations and start a new life. Both theories were ultimately abandoned.

In the end, only Elisabeth F. was formally charged with murder. After a lengthy investigation and legal process, the case went to trial.

== Verdicts and appeals ==
Elisabeth F. was initially convicted of murder by the Stuttgart Regional Court. However, on July 31, 1996, Germany’s Federal Court of Justice (Bundesgerichtshof, BGH) overturned the verdict on legal grounds, citing insufficient evidence (Case No. 1 StR 274/96, sometimes referred to as “Pistachio Ice Cream Case I”). The case was sent back for retrial at the Heilbronn Regional Court.

At the second trial, Elisabeth F. was again found guilty. However, in a second appeal, the Federal Court of Justice reversed this conviction as well. On January 19, 1999, the court acquitted Elisabeth F. of murder due to lack of sufficient evidence (Case No. 1 StR 171/98, or “Pistachio Ice Cream Case II”). This time, the Federal Prosecutor General had advised the court to dismiss the appeal as “manifestly unfounded.”.

== Legal assessment ==
In its decision, the Federal Court of Justice emphasized that the evidence presented against Elisabeth F. was not strong enough to justify a conviction. Much of the lower courts’ reasoning had been based on speculative interpretations of her demeanor—such as her calm behavior at the hospital and funeral—or subjective impressions of her “unusual” character.

The court criticized this approach as legally insufficient. Under German law, a criminal conviction must be based on objective and verifiable evidence, not merely the personal belief or intuition of the trial judge. The court found that no direct link could be established between the defendant and the act of poisoning. Instead, the case relied heavily on conjecture, circumstantial interpretation, and what the court called a “presumption of guilt.”

Because of this lack of conclusive evidence, the Federal Court of Justice not only overturned the conviction but also declined to refer the case for a third trial—stating that no new findings were likely to emerge.

== Legal significance ==
The Pistachio ice cream case is significant in German legal history for two main reasons:

First, it marked a rare instance in which the Federal Court of Justice itself issued a final acquittal, rather than referring the case back to a lower court. Normally, the Federal Court only rules on points of law and does not determine factual guilt or innocence. However, under Section 354(1) of the German Code of Criminal Procedure, the court may directly acquit a defendant if it determines that the conduct in question was not criminal under the law. In this case, the court found that the available evidence did not support a conviction, making further trials legally impermissible.

Second, the ruling served as a precedent-setting reminder of the limits of judicial discretion in evaluating evidence. The court stressed that a trial judge’s subjective conviction must be backed by objectively verifiable evidence. The case has since been cited in discussions of evidentiary standards and the presumption of innocence in German criminal law.
