= US-International Women in Science Dialogue =

Sixteen women scientists gather to discuss a wide-ranging variety of topics

The US-International Women in Science Dialogue was a conference held in June 2011 that brought sixteen women scientists from different countries to talk about their experiences as women in science. It was moderated by Sherburne Abbott. The discussions included public questions from Twitter.

== Attendees ==
- Ana Lucia Assad, Ministry of Science and Technology, Brazil.
- Ansam Sawalha, West Bank

and others.
