= Annie Ackerman =

American political activist (1914–1989)

Anne Ackerman
- Born: January 28, 1914
- Died: April 1, 1989 (aged 75)
- Other name: Condo Queen
- Occupation: Activist

Anne Ackerman (Note: Despite being named "Anne", Ackerman went by "Annie".) (January 28, 1914 – March 1, 1989) was an American political activist. After retiring to Florida in 1969, Ackerman organized thousands of residents of condominiums near where she lived into a politically active group. Condominium residents turned out at very high rates and were recognized as a powerful force in the state's politics: politicians running for local and national office sought Ackerman's endorsement.

She moved to North Miami, Florida, from Chicago, where she had been a member of the B'nai B'rith Jewish service organization and active in local politics. Ackerman used her influence to advocate for a number of issues in Miami-Dade County, including gun regulation, rapid-transit, and an ordinance banning phosphates in detergent. Many of the 2,000 residents of the Point East condominium complex where she lived followed her voting advice, turning out at rates that ranked among the state's highest. Ackerman remained active as she struggled with cancer, returning to work after a 1986 stroke and as late as 1988, at which point she was bedridden. She died early the following year

Ackerman was recognized as a powerful figure in local and state politics: she became known as the "condo queen" or "condo commando" for her influence. In 1986 she was inducted into the Florida Women's Hall of Fame, and the following year a stretch of Biscayne Boulevard was named in her honor.

== Early life ==
Anne Gdalman was born on January 28, 1914. Her parents were Jewish émigrés from Russia, having left in their teenage years (her mother was fourteen and her father nineteen). While her father had studied the Talmud in Russia, in the US he worked in the garment industry. Gdalman had four brothers, including Louis Gdalman. She remained a practicing member of the Jewish faith throughout her life. Gdalman grew up in Chicago, and reported becoming politically active at a very young age, participating in a strike with her father when she was five years old.

She married Irving Ackerman, an insurance worker, around 1934. She gathered information on the Nazi German American Bund in World War II for a Jewish organization. Ackerman later volunteered for Richard M. Daley, who was Mayor of Chicago, working as a ward organizer. Saul Alinsky was described as one of her mentors. When Alvin Freeman ran for congress against Charles Boyle Ackerman was in charge of his "women's division". In 1963 she ran for a spot as alderman from Chicago's 50th district, but had withdrawn by February.

Ackerman was also an active member of the B'nai B'rith Jewish service organization, co-founding and serving as president of the Haym Solomon Chapter of B'nai B'rith Women. In 1944, she was president of the B'nai B'rith Women Chicago Council, and in 1950 held a term as president of District No. 6 of B'nai B'rith Women. Ten years later she spent a year as president of the national Conference of Jewish Women's Organizations. Ackerman became known for her book reviews and presentations on Jewish books.

== In Florida ==
In 1969, Ackerman moved to Florida with her husband, retiring in the Point East condominium in North Miami Beach, Florida, a complex of condominiums with about 2,000 inhabitants. Noting the lack of political organization in Point East, Ackerman formed and led an association aimed at advocating on behalf of condo residents.

=== Activism ===
Ackerman and her friend Mollie Lovinger first became politically active in the 1970s in response to water pollution in Miami-Dade County. Lovinger had read a newspaper article about the potential negative effects of phosphates and untreated sewage on the region's water, and the two resolved to advocate for restrictions to preserve water quality. They created an advocacy group of retirees known as the "Pollution Revolution". Its structure was modeled after an army, with Lovinger the 'general', Ackerman the 'colonel', four majors, a 'captain' assigned to each of the seventeen condominium buildings in Point East, and a 'lieutenant' for each floor.

The organization enlisted a lawyer to write a draft ordinance that would ban phosphates in detergent. Over the course of two months they got 10,000 signatures on a petition in support of the ordinance. A hearing on the issue before the Dade County Commission had hundreds of attendees in favor of the ban, and it was passed on January 1, 1972. The ordinance was upheld despite the efforts of laundry detergent manufacturers to secure its overturn. Following this success, the "Pollution Revolution" switched its focus to fighting sewage pollution in the county.

In 1973 Ackerman and other condo residents protested the development of outfalls that would have dumped sewage directly into the ocean. Ackerman and Lovinger next focused their efforts on fighting against Richard Nixon's proposals for health care reform. In 1978 she urged support for rapid-transit in the region. She also worked on a gun-control law for the county, boycotts of meat and coffee, and a number of other local movements. Ackerman was credited with convincing the senator Richard Stone to support Abner Mikva's nomination to a judicial position.

=== Political power ===
Ackerman's condo association soon became politically powerful in Florida, as there were tens of thousands of condo residents. A 1988 profile credited her with being able to "personally deliver a 40,000 block vote and influence thousands more." Point East in particular became known as a Democratic stronghold with high turnout rates, as Ackerman encouraged residents to vote and her organization distributed cards advising retirees on how to vote. It was estimated that she could personally control 2,000 votes. Her endorsement was often sought by state and national politicians, including Reubin Askew during his senate campaign, and Jimmy Carter, Walter Mondale, and Michael Dukakis in their presidential campaigns.

In 1985 she received an award in recognition of her work to ensure high turnouts for the Democratic Party. At the convention where she accepted the award, Joe Biden quipped that he wanted to be buried in Ackerman's district upon his death, where he could continue to vote. Turnout rates in her precinct were usually among the highest in Florida, a factor that many in the area attributed to Ackerman's work, noting that while she was in the hospital in 1986, turnout fell precipitously, to half its previous rate in the Democratic primary. In June 1986 she had a stroke and was partially paralyzed, but within 12 weeks had left the hospital and was attending meetings in a wheelchair. By 1988, Ackerman was sick with cancer and confined to her bed, but she continued her political work: a profile in March stated that she worked for twelve hours a day.

== Personal life and death ==
She married Irving Ackerman, an insurance worker, around 1934. The couple had three children. Irving died around 1981. She died on March 1, 1989, of cancer. Her funeral was attended by 300 people.

== Recognition ==
Charles Whitehead, the chair of the Florida Democratic Party, said in 1988 that Ackerman "wields more power than any other private citizen in Florida". She never ran for political office, feeling that politicians could not "speak their minds." She was known as the "condo queen" and "condo commando" for the influence she held. She was inducted into the Florida Women's Hall of Fame in 1986. A 30-block portion of Biscayne Boulevard was named after her in 1987, a decision the mayor of Miami criticized as unusual because Ackerman was still alive when the renaming occurred. In 1990, after Ackerman's death, the Miami Herald reported that the condominium residents previously led by her organization had become divided into factions as no clear successor to her emerged.

== See also ==
- Amadeo Trinchitella
