= Poison Control Centre at Amrita Institute of Medical Sciences =

Poison Control Centre in AIMS

Poison Control Centre, Amrita Institute of Medical Sciences & Research
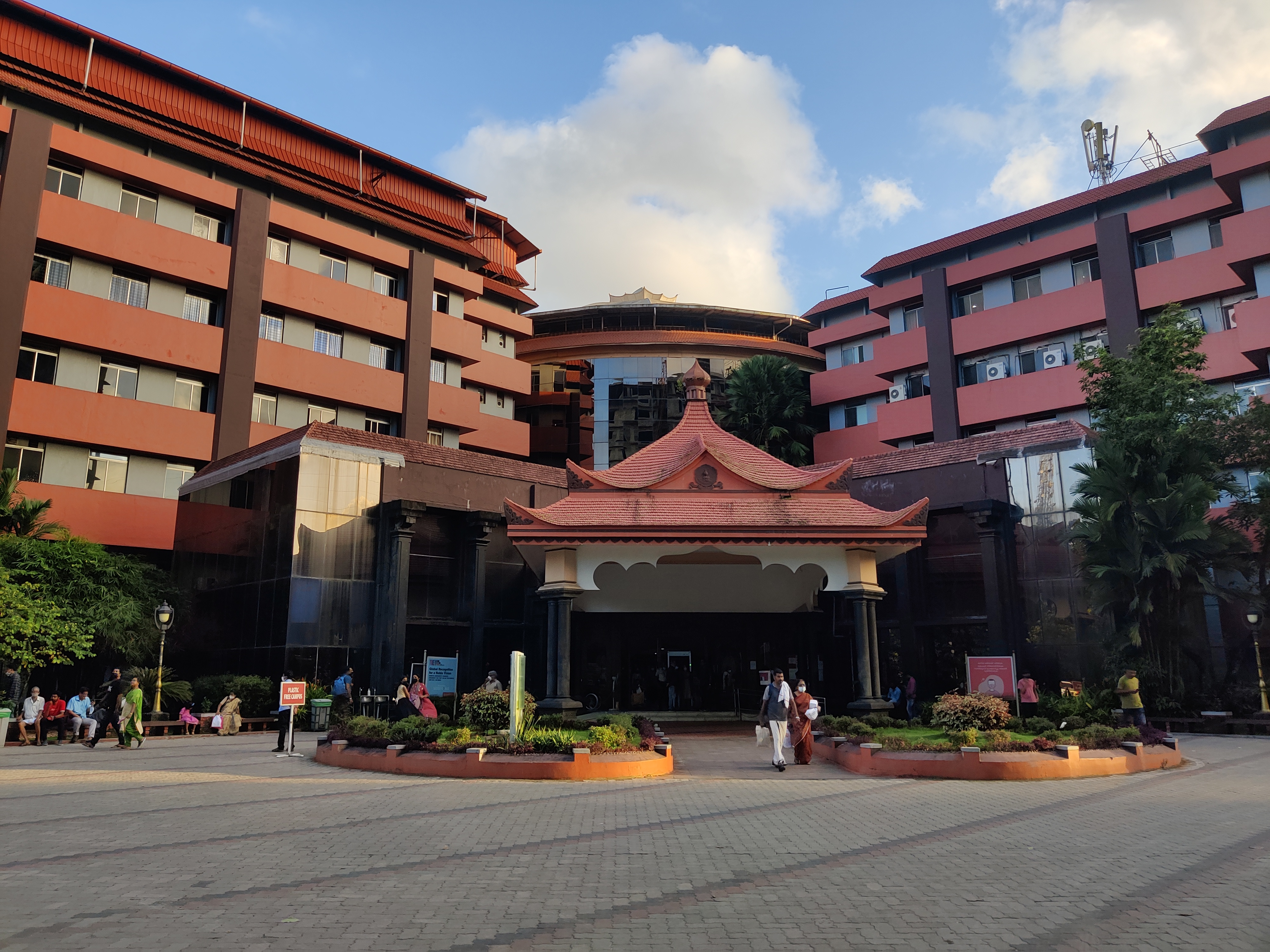
- PCC, AIMS Kochi
- Type: Private, Deemed University
- Established: 2003
- Accreditation: NABL
- Head: Dr. V. V. Pillay
- Location: Kochi, Kerala 682041, India; 10.0328°N 76.293°E
- Campus: Urban
- Website: https://www.amritahospitals.org/kochi/department/speciality-departments/poison-control-centre

The Poison Control Centre at Amrita Institute of Medical Sciences (AIMS) in Kochi, India, is a specialised toxicology facility dedicated to managing poison-related emergencies, toxic exposures, and chemical hazards. The centre plays a pivotal role in the prompt diagnosis, treatment, and prevention of poisoning cases, providing essential support to both healthcare professionals and the general public.

== History ==
The Poison Control Centre at AIMS was established in 2003 and became fully operational in January 2005 to address the growing need for comprehensive poison control services in the region. Since its inception, it has been actively involved in poison management, offering guidance and treatment for cases of accidental poisonings, overdoses, and exposures to toxic substances. It is one of the few Poison Control Centres (PCCs) in India listed in the World Health Organization's Global Directory of Poison Control Centers. The centre is accredited by the National Accreditation Board for Testing and Calibration Laboratories (NABL) as part of the overall clinical laboratory services of Amrita Hospital.

It is listed as a public facility and operates 24 hours a day in the World Health Organization's directory of poison control centres.

== Mission and objectives ==
The primary mission of the Poison Control Centre (PCC) is to provide up-to-date and comprehensive information on poisons, poisoning, and analytical toxicology to hospitals, medical practitioners, and the general public. It aims to facilitate prompt and informed responses to poison-related incidents. The facility integrates information resources, analytical capabilities, and research initiatives.

== Types of samples processed ==
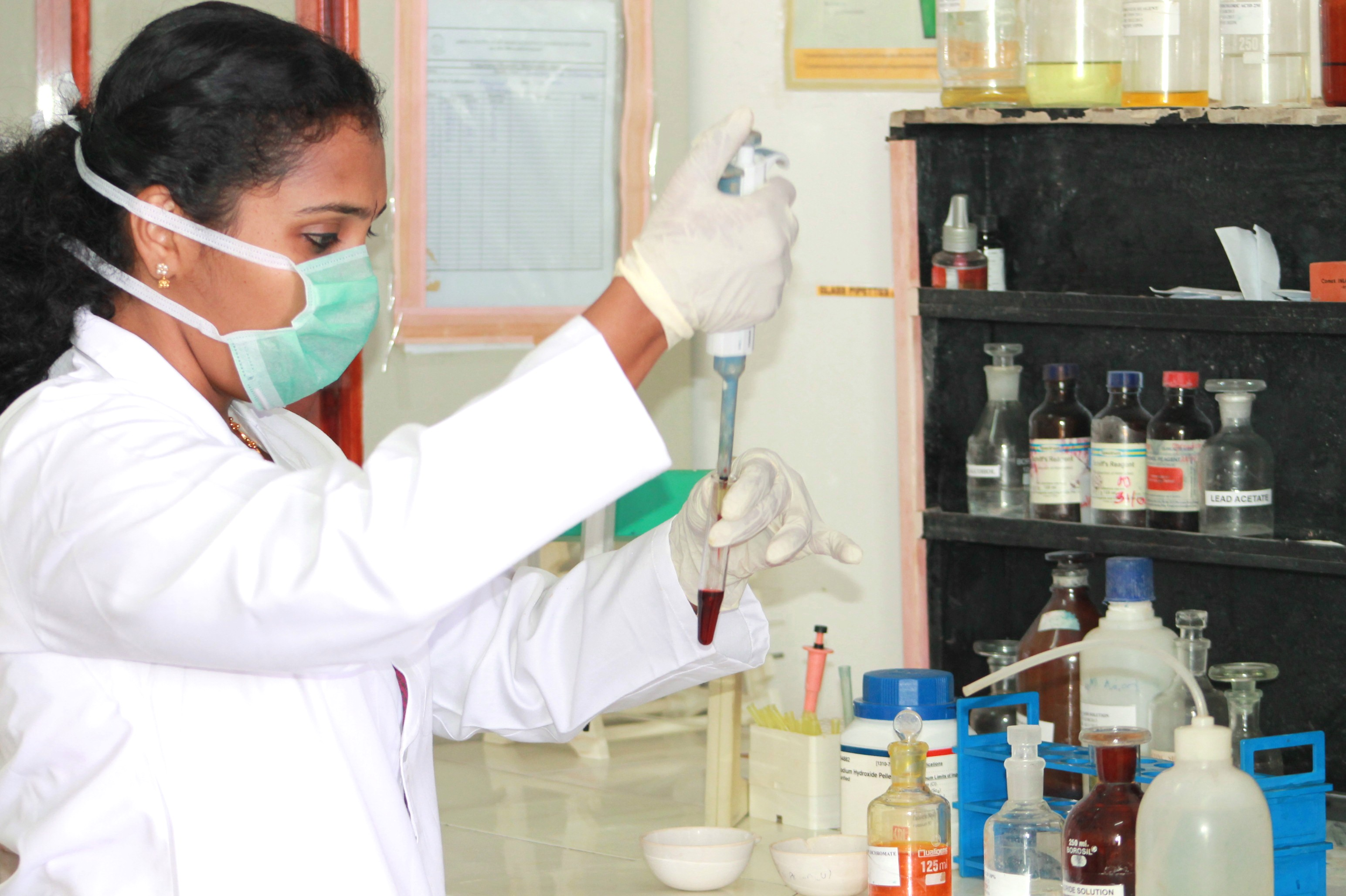
Toxicology testing of sample

Body fluids such as blood, urine, and stomach contents (e.g., vomitus), as well as commercial products like medicines and food samples, are analysed to detect the presence of poisons or drugs. Both routine and medicolegal cases are handled; however, viscera samples from forensic cases are usually not accepted. The department utilises the TOXBASE (UK) toxicology database, which contains information on hundreds of poisonous substances encountered worldwide.

== Initiatives ==
The Centre is actively involved in developing a unique toxicology database tailored to the specific needs of doctors and hospitals across India. This initiative aims to enhance the effectiveness of managing poisoning and overdose cases.

The Centre's staff contribute to the toxicology fraternity by participating in and organising activities under the Indian Society of Toxicology (IST), a national professional organisation dedicated to promoting academics and research in toxicology. The existing analytical toxicology laboratory will be expanded further to enable the analysis of a wider range of toxicants in living victims of poisoning, as well as serve as a referral centre for forensic cases.

The Centre has the capability to answer virtually any query related to poisons/poisoning/drug overdose/substance abuse/envenomation posed by hospitals, government doctors, private practitioners, as well as the lay public.

The Centre has an advisory role in the Kerala State Disaster Management Authority, and periodic training is given to medical officers in the industrial sector with regard to responding to a chemical emergency.

The staff also contribute to managing and publishing peer-reviewed articles in indexed journals for ongoing research in the field. The Journal of Indian Society of Toxicology (JIST) is a peer-reviewed publication that ensures the scientific merit and toxicological significance of its diverse content. It has been the official publication of the Indian Society of Toxicology (IST) since 2005.

The main aim of JIST is to publish timely, peer-reviewed, and high-quality research works in toxicology and disseminate research findings. The publication language is English, and it is published biannually. The International Standard Serial Number (ISSN) details are as follows:

ISSN (Print): 0973-3558

ISSN (Electronic): 0973-3566

ISSN (Linking): 0973-3558

The MeSH terms associated with JIST are Hazardous Substances/poisoning, Poisoning, and Toxicology.
