= Ansam Sawalha =

Ansam Sawalha (born 1969), who is the Dean of the Faculty of Pharmacy at An-Najah National University, is the first Palestinian woman named to the Women in Science Hall of Fame. Sawalha was honored for her achievement of establishing the first Poison Control and Drug Information Center in Palestine in 2006.

== Early life and education ==
Sawalha earned her pharmacy degree at the University of Texas at Austin.

== Career ==
Sawalha started at An-Najah University in 1999 as faculty of the university pharmacy program.
