= Tamm (Württ) station =

Railway station in Tamm, Germany

Tamm (Württ)
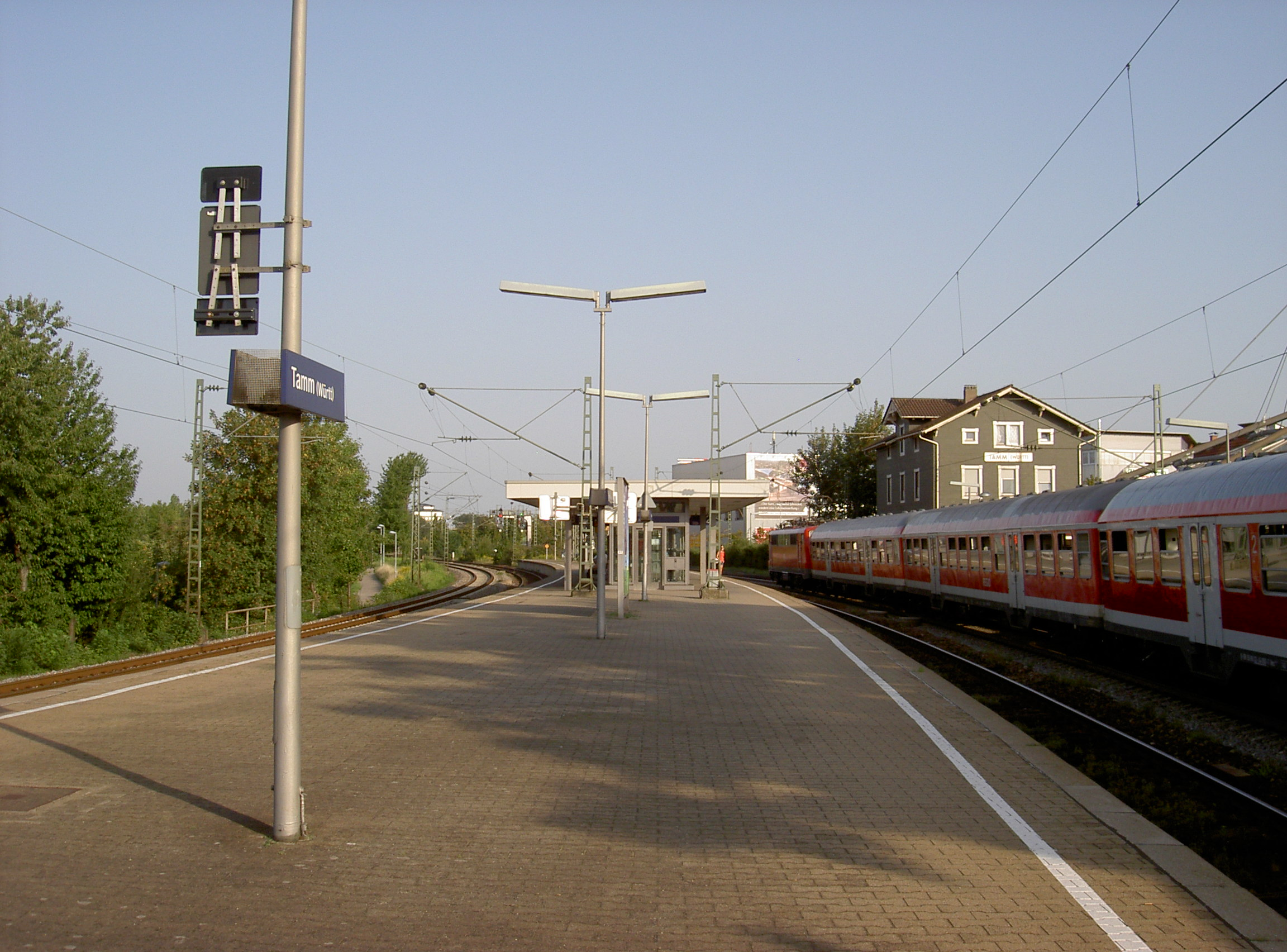

General information
- Location: Bahnhofstr. 15, Tamm, Baden-Württemberg; Germany
- Coordinates: 48°55′18″N 9°7′31″E
- Lines: Franconia Railway (KBS 780, KBS 790.5)
- Platforms: 3 (2 in regular use)

Construction
- Accessible: Yes

Other information
- Station code: 6137
- DS100 code: TTM
- IBNR: 8005820
- Category: 4
- Fare zone: : 3
- Website: www.bahnhof.de

History
- Opened: 10 December 1877

Services
Preceding station	Stuttgart S-Bahn	Following station
Asperg towards Schwabstraße	S5	Bietigheim-Bissingen Terminus
Location

Tamm (Württemberg) station (abbreviated to Tamm (Württ)) is a station on the network of the Stuttgart S-Bahn in Tamm in the German state of Baden-Württemberg, located at the 20.2 kilometre mark of the Franconia Railway.

== History ==
In 1843 and 1844, planning for the development of railway lines around Stuttgart were in full swing. The engineer and expert Charles Vignoles foresaw the Western Railway towards Bruchsal branching off the Northern Railway (now called the Franconia Railway) towards Heilbronn near Tamm. His colleague, railway engineer Karl Etzel revised his proposal in July 1845 and advised against it. He recommended that the Western Railway separate from the Northern Railway at Bietigheim.

The Royal Württemberg State Railways (Königlich Württembergische Staatsbahn) offered to build a station in Tamm. But the council and a citizens' committee saw no advantage in the new form on transport and decided on 1 June 1846 not to accept the offer— which turned out to be a serious mistake.

On 11 October 1847, the State Railways opened the Ludwigsburg–Bietigheim section and in 1852 it was duplicated.

=== Campaign for a station ===
The municipality sought the building of a station at renewed talks, but the railways department refused, pointing out that the stations of Asperg and Bietigheim were within easy reach.

Timber from the Black Forest was still brought to the region on the Enz as timber rafts. Many were brought ashore in Bissingen. A new wood collection operation was developed near Tamm in the 1860s, making Tamm more important. But once again the State Railways administration pointed out that the stations of Asperg and Bietigheim were available to serve this traffic. And it knew that timber rafting would become a thing of the past, with the completion of the Enz Valley Railway and Nagold Valley Railway.

In the spring of 1874, the council asked the members of the Ludwigsburg Oberamt (district council) for assistance. It recommended petitions to the administration of the State Railways and to the Foreign Minister, Hermann von Mittnacht. These representations were also supported by industrialists, including the Franck brothers, who employed 40 people from Tamm in their Ludwigsburg factory, which produced a coffee substitute from chicory, and Adolf Reihlen of Stuttgart, owner of the Stuttgart sugar factory, who wanted to profit from the sugar beet cultivation in Tamm. Even the mayor of the town of Markgröningen and the municipalities of Bissingen and Untermberg supported the building of a station.

=== Opening of the station ===
Finally the State Railways agreed to build the station in Thamm (as it was spelt until 1904) and on 10 December 1877, it opened for traffic. The three-storey station building, which still exists, was built. There was a scatter of industries south of the station. The village grew to the west of the station. The lakeside meadow to the north remained undeveloped and development to the east was prevented by the Asperg boundary.

=== Deutsche Reichsbahn and Deutsche Bundesbahn period ===
It was proposed that a bypass of Bietigheim station would separate north of Tamm from the Northern Railway and connect with the Western Railway before Metterzimmern station. Although Deutsche Reichsbahn approved this project was in 1937, it was never built. In 1940, a third track was built on the Northern Railway between Ludwigsburg and Bietigheim.

On 10 November 1950, Deutsche Bundesbahn completed electrification of this section and commenced the operation of Stuttgart suburban services on it. Similarly the Stuttgart S-Bahn commenced services to Tamm on 31 May 1981 after a fourth track was added on the Ludwigsburg–Bietigheim section.

== Rail services ==
The station is served by the S 5 of the Stuttgart S-Bahn. Track 1, next to the station building, is used by non-stopping trains running to Ludwigsburg and passengers no longer have access to the platform. S-Bahn services to Ludwigsburg stop on track 2 and to Bietigheim stop on track 3. Track 4—which also has no platform—is a through track for trains towards Bietigheim.

Tamm station is classified by Deutsche Bahn as a category 4 station.

=== S-Bahn ===
Line	Route
S 5	Bietigheim – Tamm – Ludwigsburg – Zuffenhausen – Hauptbahnhof – Schwabstraße
