= Asperg station =

Railway station in Asperg, Germany

Asperg
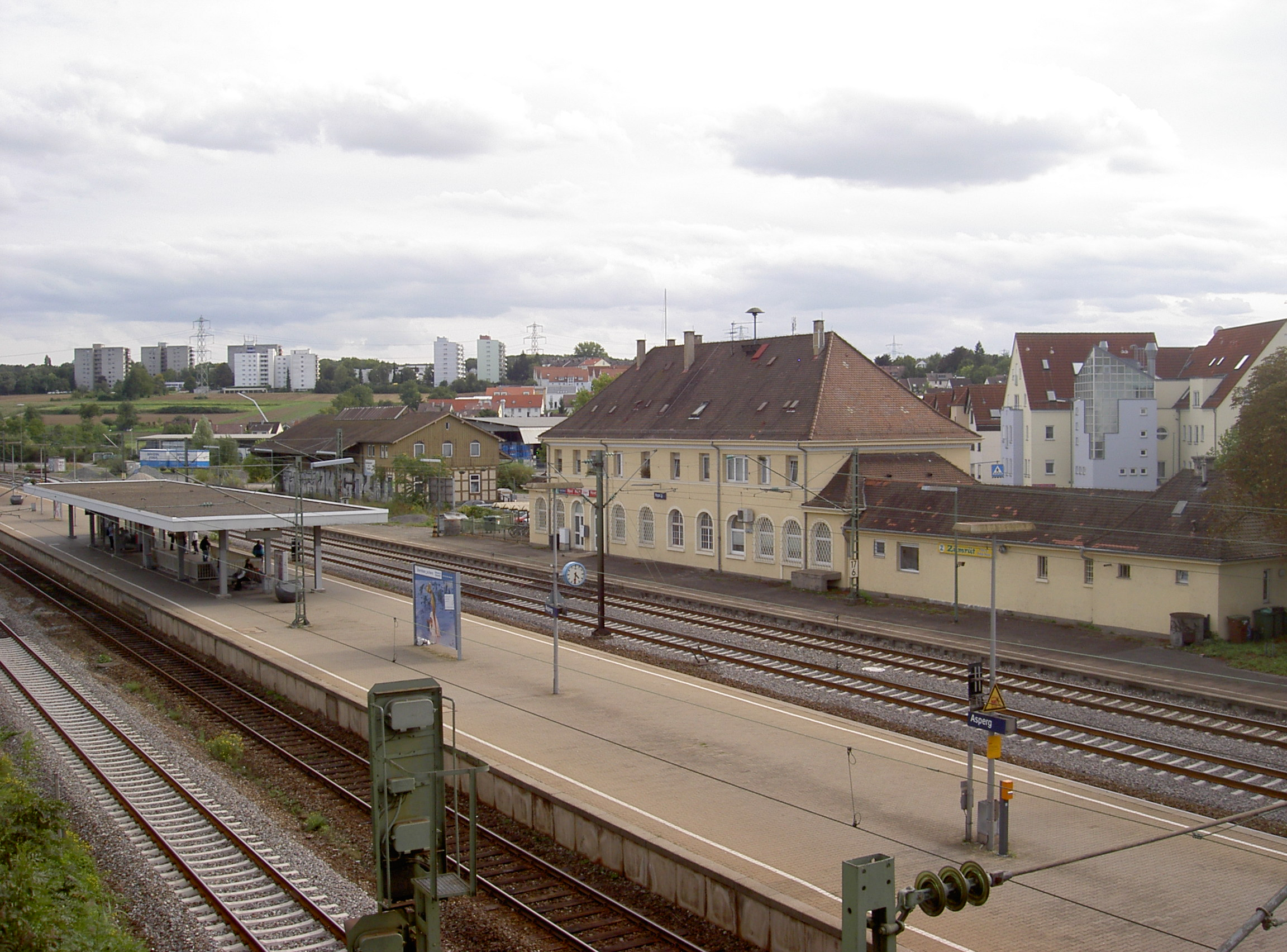

General information
- Location: Alleenstr.1, Asperg, Baden-Württemberg; Germany
- Coordinates: 48°54′25″N 9°8′53″E
- Lines: Franconia Railway (KBS 780, KBS 790.5)
- Platforms: 3 (2 in regular use)

Construction
- Accessible: Yes

Other information
- Station code: 196
- DS100 code: TAX
- IBNR: 8000630
- Category: 4
- Fare zone: : 2 and 3
- Website: www.bahnhof.de

History
- Opened: 11 October 1847

Services
Preceding station	Stuttgart S-Bahn	Following station
Ludwigsburg towards Schwabstraße	S5	Tamm (Württ) towards Bietigheim-Bissingen
Location

Asperg station is a station on the network of the Stuttgart S-Bahn in the German state of Baden-Württemberg, located at the 17.6 kilometre mark of the Franconia Railway.

== History ==
Between 1846 and 1848 the Royal Württemberg State Railways (Königlich Württembergischen Staats-Eisenbahnen) gradually opened the Northern Railway from the south in order to connect Stuttgart and Heilbronn. On 11 October 1847, regular operation began on the section between Ludwigsburg and Bietigheim. Asperg station was opened as the only stop for the time being on this approximately nine and a half kilometre long stretch. It was equipped with a small two-storey entrance building . It was about a kilometre east of the village. The road leading to the station initially remained unpaved and was barely passable in bad weather. In 1852 the railway from Stuttgart to Bietigheim was duplicated.

Gradually Asperg grew towards the station. New residential and commercial buildings were built along Bahnhofstrasse (station street). The station building was raised by one-story on the south side. In 1875, the number of inhabitants had increased to over 2,000 and the town regained its municipal independence, which it had lost in the 18th century.

=== Proposal for Asperg to become a railway junction ===
In 1896, the Markgröningen city council asked the State Railways for the first time to construct a branch line from Asperg to Markgröningen. The Asperg municipal council was involved extensively with this new opportunity for the city in 1899. The number of factories that had been established by that time was not enough to generate the level of prosperity expected. A new branch line that passed south of Asperg would support a new industrial park, connected with sidings, and provide an incentive for the establishment of large companies. The councilors praised the good neighbourly relations between the citizens of the two towns and gave their support to the municipality of Markgröningen. This was followed by a petition to the Württemberg Ministry of Foreign Affairs, which was then responsible for policy on the matter, as well as another petition to the Second Chamber of the Württemberg parliament . The two petitions failed to produce the desired result, since the project was still in competition with a proposal for a branch line starting in Ludwigsburg, eventually leading to the construction of the Ludwigsburg–Markgröningen railway.

=== Upgrading ===
In 1907, the State Railway Board reported the first congestion at the station. It was decided to build new railway tracks and freight handling facilities along with a new, larger station building. The new work began in 1912.

The new building was very generous. The entrance to the main building is framed by columns. Travelers passed through this to the then newly built underpass to platforms 3 and 4. Left of the entrance were the main hall for ticketing and express freight and baggage-handling behind a small waiting room. The post office, which had been housed since 1877 in the town hall, was now located in the northern part of the station building. The windows and doors on the ground floor on the side next to the platform are provided with round arches. The hip roof rose almost to the height of the two-story facade. The former gable dormers, however, no longer exist.

On the northern side there is a slender one-storey annex with a gable roof, becoming a sort of pavilion with a hipped roof. In this part of the building, there was a drive-through to the rail tracks for the post office and storage rooms as well as a recreation room and a laundry room for railway workers. The recreation room was later replaced by public toilets.

The freight terminal building was in use from 1913. The station building was opened by the State Railways on 22 April 1914 and the previous building was demolished.

=== Deportations from Asperg ===
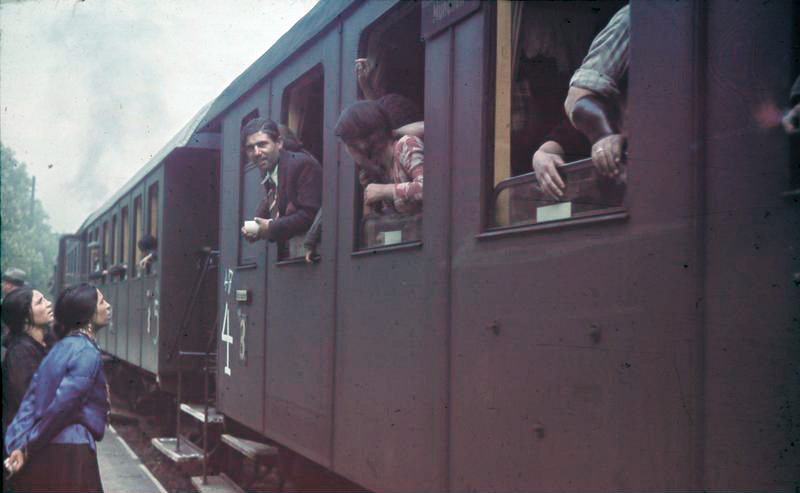
Deportation of Roma in Asperg on 22 May 1940

Between 1940 and 1945, the Nazi regime used the Hohenasperg as a concentration camp for so called “Zigeuner” (“gypsies”). The deportations to the ghettos and concentration camps in the east was carried out through Asperg station. A stone plaque on the outside wall of the entrance portal commemorates the suffering of the many innocent people that began at the station.

=== Deutsche Bundesbahn period ===
On 10 November 1950, Deutsche Bundesbahn electrified the Ludwigsburg–Bietigheim section, which had had a third track since 1940, making possible an improved suburban services between Asperg and Stuttgart. After the addition of a fourth track between Ludwigsburg and Bietigheim, line S 5 of the Stuttgart S-Bahn was extended on 31 May 1981.

== Rail services ==
The station is served by the S 5 of the Stuttgart S-Bahn. No trains stop on track 1, next to the station building, any more. Track 2 has no platform and is used by non-stopping trains running to Ludwigsburg. S-Bahn services to Ludwigsburg stop on track 3 and to Bietigheim stop on track 4. Track 5—which also has no platform—is a through track for trains towards Bietigheim. Signaling at Asperg station is remotely controlled from Ludwigsburg station.

Asperg station is classified by Deutsche Bahn as a category 4 station.

=== S-Bahn ===
Line	Route
S 5	Bietigheim – Asperg – Ludwigsburg – Zuffenhausen – Hauptbahnhof – Schwabstraße

== Sources ==
- Theodor Bolay (1978). Chronik der Stadt Asperg (in German). Bietigheim-Bissingen: Verlag Peter Krug.
- Hans-Wolfgang Scharf (2006). Die Eisenbahn im Kraichgau. Eisenbahngeschichte zwischen Rhein und Neckar (in German). Freiburg (Breisgau): EK-Verlag. ISBN 3-8825-5769-9.
