= Unique formula identifier =

European hazardous material identifier

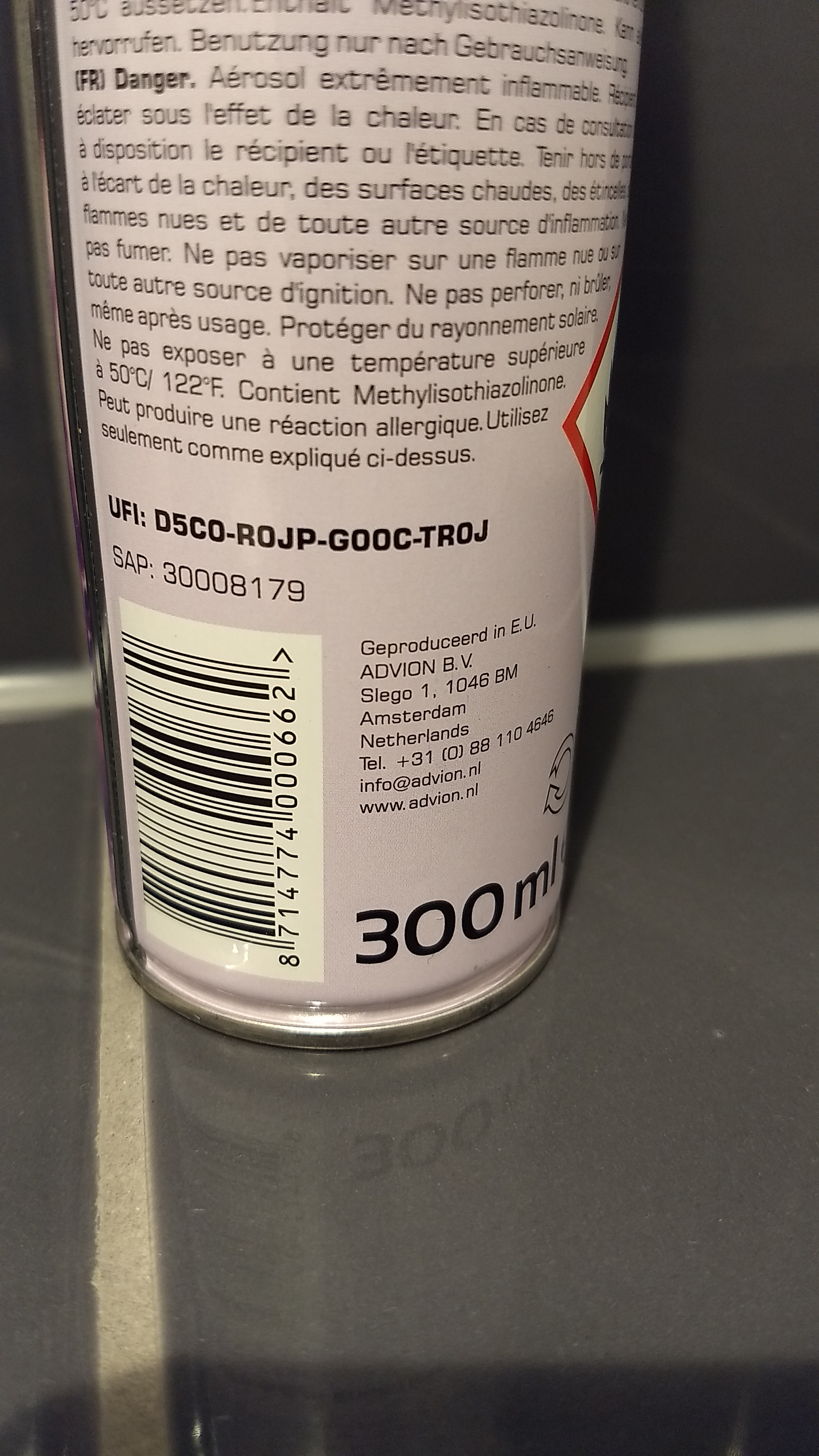
The UFI, along with a SAP code, UPC, manufacturer and address, and volume, on a can of air freshener.

The unique formula identifier (UFI) is a code printed on products with hazardous mixtures in the European Economic Area (EEA), meant to help calls to poison control centers to determine the contents.

The UFI is mandated in the European Economic Area for consumer, professional and industrial products containing hazardous mixtures. Use in new consumer products started on 1 January 2021 and will be required for industrial products on 1 January 2024. From 1 January 2025, existing products must include the UFI. The UFI is controlled by the European Chemicals Agency (ECHA).

== Format ==
The UFI takes the form of a prefix acronym UFI:, followed by a 16-digit alphanumeric code, separated in 4 blocks with dashes. All letters are upper case and letters that are hard to discern from numerals are omitted. The UFI contains a checksum. A UFI (with prefix) looks like:

UFI: N1QV-R02N-J00M-WQD5

The UFI must be printed on the packaging where it is easy to find, near the hazard label elements or bar code, or if it is an unpackaged product, on the safety data sheet.

== Data handling ==
A company preparing, modifying, or repackaging a mixture (downstream user, „manufacturer“ of mixture) submits the chemical composition with toxicological information, as well as additional information such as product trade name, packaging and colour, via the ECHA to member states‘ appointed bodies (e.g. poison control centers). Before they submit the dataset a UFI was created e.g. by using ECHA’s UFI generator webtool. Finally the company prints the UFI on the label. A UFI is always assigned to one mixture (or several very similar mixtures), but the UFI may be used in different packaging varieties or brand names. Multiple UFI's may be assigned to the same mixture.

The chemical composition of the UFI is kept secret and available only to the ECHA and connected poison centres.

UFI is mandated from January 1, 2021 for products for consumer or professional use, and from January 1, 2024 for new products for industrial use. Existing mixtures that are already identified with a UFI at a national poison centre may need labeling from January 2025.
