= Toxicovigilance =

Process of identifying and evaluating the risks of poisoning

Toxicovigilance is the process of identifying and evaluating the risks of poisoning that exist within a community, and proposing and evaluating measures taken to reduce, eliminate or manage them. More specifically, the goal of toxicovigilance is to identify specific circumstances or agents giving rise to poisoning, or certain populations suffering a higher incidence of poisoning. This way, emerging toxicological issues can be revealed, such as the reformulation of a chemical product or a change to its packaging or labelling, the spread of a new illegal drug, or a hazardous environmental contamination. Once an issue has been identified, appropriate health and other authorities can be alerted so they can take the necessary preventive, repressive or regulatory measures.

The practice of toxicovigilance often involves the registration of cases of poisoning by health professionals, or the analysis of enquiries made to poison control centers. Because of this, practising toxicovigilance is often one of the core tasks of a poison control center.

There is an overlap between toxicovigilance and for example pharmacovigilance or environmental health. They are all are aspects of the broader concept of public health surveillance.

== See also ==
- Public health
- Toxicology
