= Amadeo Trinchitella =

Amadeo Trinchitella (died February 4, 2005) was an American political organizer for the Democratic Party. He was best known for his power in retirement communities in Broward County, Florida.

== Biography ==
Trinchitella served as a marine in World War II. Afterwards, he worked as a piano mover, and eventually ran a bar and restaurant in New York City. In 1976, he retired to a condominium in Century Village in Broward County, Florida. Broward County in the 1970s–1990s was a stronghold of voters for the Democratic Party, and one of the nation's most politically active counties.

Upon arriving, Trinchitella quickly became involved in organizing other condominium owners, eventually becoming head of the Recreation Committee of the Condominium Owners of Century Village East. He soon developed a reputation for being able to get thousands of retirees to the polls during elections. In recognition of this, Democratic candidates for statewide office frequently visited Century Village, and votes from the area were cited as particularly important in the 1996 and 2000 presidential elections. Trinchitella used his sway to advocate for construction of a health clinic in Century Village and an elementary school in Deerfield Beach, and against construction of the SW 10th street connector between Interstate 95 and Florida State Road 869.

In 1999, Trinchitella resigned from the Deerfield city commission. That year,The New York Times reported that "[n]o one gets elected in this part of Florida, everyone here says, unless first they talk to 'Trinchi.'" US President Bill Clinton deemed the politician Robert Wexler "Trinchi’s congressman" in recognition of the role that Trinchitella played in Wexler's election to the US House of Representatives.

== Personal life and death ==
Trinchitella was married to Maria for fifty years before she died in 1991. He died on February 4, 2005. In an obituary the Orlando Sentinel described him as a "democratic kingpin". His death was cited by several newspapers as marking the end of the era where Democrats in Broward County held substantial power.

== See also ==
- Annie Ackerman
