= Louis Gdalman =

Pharmacist and founder of Poison Control Centers

Louis Gdalman (1910–1995) was the director of Pharmacy and Central Services at Rush-Presbyterian-St. Luke's Medical Center in Chicago.

He is notable for starting the first poison control center in the United States in 1953 along with Edward Press. This effort was driven by 400+ children dying across the country every year from eating high-dose medicine that looked and tasted like candy. Many of these deaths would have been preventable if people had better access to information about antidotes, poison control measures and how to treat a victim.

He was the only pharmacist elected a fellow of the Institute of Medicine of Chicago.
