= Tamm =

- Town
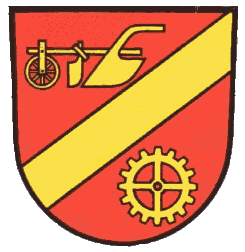
- Coat of arms

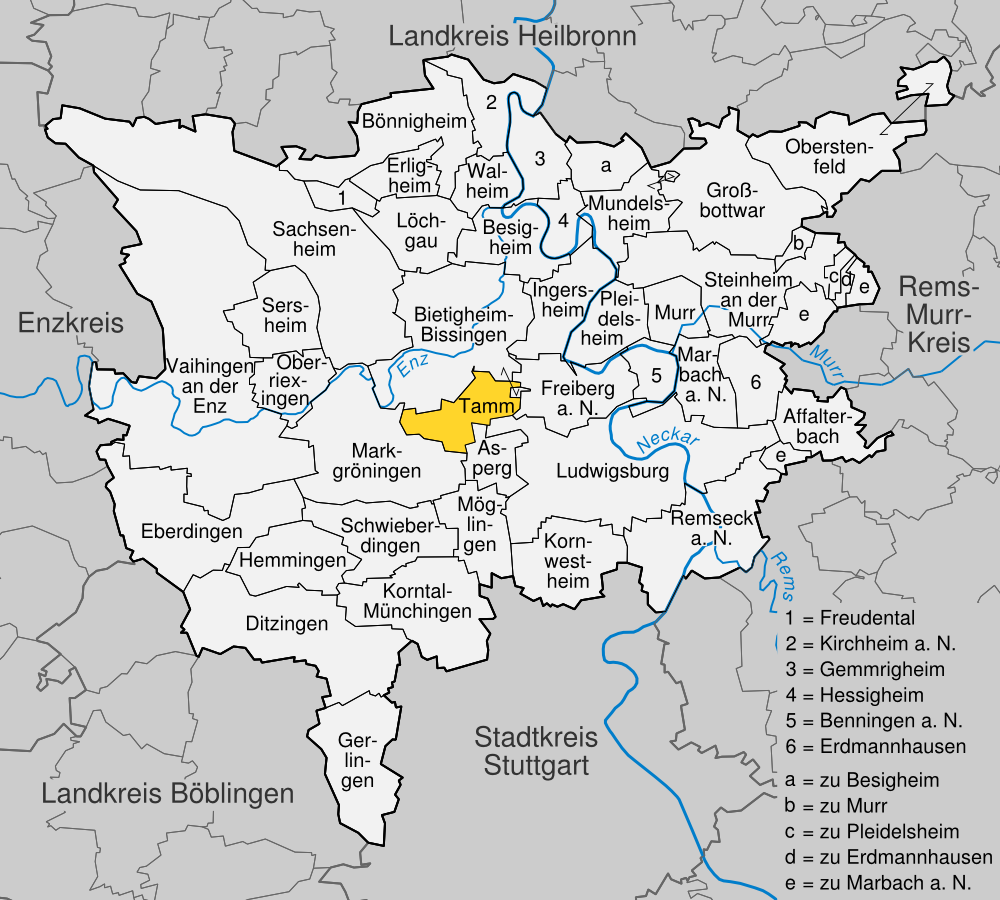
- Location of Tamm within Ludwigsburg district
- Interactive map of Tamm
- Location within Germany Location within Baden-Württemberg
- Coordinates: 48°55′N 09°7′E
- Country: Germany
- State: Baden-Württemberg
- Admin. region: Stuttgart
- District: Ludwigsburg

Government
  - Mayor (2022–30): Martin Bernhard

Area
  - Total: 8.78 km^{2} (3.39 sq mi)
- Elevation: 259 m (850 ft)

Population (2025-12-31)
  - Total: 12,245
  - Density: 1,390/km^{2} (3,610/sq mi)
- Time zone: UTC+01:00 (CET)
  - Summer (DST): UTC+02:00 (CEST)
- Postal codes: 71730-71732
- Dialling codes: 07141
- Vehicle registration: LB, VAI
- Website: www.tamm.org

Tamm (German pronunciation: [tam]) is a Stadt (town) in the district of Ludwigsburg, Baden-Württemberg, Germany. It is situated 6 km northwest of Ludwigsburg, 4 km south of Bietigheim-Bissingen, and approx. 17 km north of Stuttgart's city center. As of 2020, the town had 12,628 inhabitants.

== History ==
Tamm is one of the older settlements in the area. Its first official mentioning was in 1287. In 1351, the village was gifted to Eberhard II, Count of Württemberg by Katherina von Veihingen, a member of the Counts Palatinate of Tübingen.

In the 17th century, Tamm was almost completely destroyed during the Thirty Years' War, and the reconstruction of core buildings, such as the central fortified church of Saint Bartholomew, wasn't complete until 25 years after the war's end in 1648.

During the 18th century Tamm's inhabitants participated in the construction of the Duke of Württemberg's new residence in nearby Ludwigsburg, mostly as socagers. In these days, population skyrocketed, from 543 in 1741 to nearly 1000 in 1800. While Tamm was not directly affected by the Napoleonic Wars, it still suffered from the economic strain put on the entire region. Shortly after the war, in 1816, a famine hit, marking a temporary decline in Tamm's development. During the rest of the 19th century, the village grew steadily, getting connected to the railroad in 1877.

World War I and the economic crisis caused by the defeat and dissolution of the German Empire again had a negative impact on the village.

In 1935, two years after the Nazi Party's "Machtergreifung", Tamm's liberal acting mayor Karl Mammele was forced to resign and committed suicide soon after. While Tamm was target of occasional air raids as soon as 1941, the village didn't see any "real" fighting until April 1945, when it was repeatedly shelled during a twelve-day stand-off between Wehrmacht and Free French Forces in nearby Bietigheim-Bissingen. Tamm was captured and occupied by the French Army on April 21, 1945. In July of the same year, the village was transferred to US control, eventually becoming part of the American occupation zone. The post-war years were marked by food and fuel shortages, but Tamm soon recovered and flourished once again, reaching 3900 inhabitants in 1961.

In the following decades large expansion projects resulted in the creation of the new "Ortsteil" (suburb) Hohenstange, north-east of the old village core, more than doubling Tamm's population (11,500 in 1990). This feat was possible mainly due to Tamm's very attractive position in direct proximity to both the Autobahn A81 and the railway line between Stuttgart and Heilbronn. Continuing popularity led to another building phase in the early 21st century, finally connecting the old village ("Ortsmitte") with the Hohenstange borough, which had formerly been divided by a stretch of farmland.

The presence of well-known corporations (both Porsche and Bosch have offices in Tamm), stable middle class enterprises, and a large shopping mall (the "Breuningerland") have made Tamm relatively rich, financing a complete overhaul of the town's railway station, village square, and road system.

== Population ==
Tamm's population was 12,112 at the 2005 census. Considering that, in practice, towns of more than 12,000 inhabitants may apply for city status, the "Gemeinde Tamm" may be eligible to become "Stadt Tamm" in the future.

Development since 1980 ^{source}:

- 1980: 8,364
- 1982: 8,873
- 1984: 9,586
- 1986: 10,615
- 1988: 11,261
- 1990: 11,500
- 1992: 11,840
- 1994: 11,731
- 1996: 11,751
- 1998: 11,463
- 2000: 11,455
- 2002: 12,067
- 2004: 12,060
- 2005: 12,112

== Politics ==
=== Current ===
The current mayor of Tamm is Martin Bernhard (since 2014).

The municipal council is made up of the following parties:

- AWV (Allgemeine Wählervereinigung): 5 seats (24.60%)
- CDU: 4 seats (24.41%)
- SPD: 3 seats (18.69%)
- LLT (Liste Lebenswertes Tamm e.V.): 3 seats (17.83%)
- Bündnis 90/Die Grünen: 3 seats (14.48%)

=== Coat of arms ===
The coat of arms of Tamm shows a bend sinister Or, representing a dam (ger.: Damm, hence the name "Tamm") on a red field, with a golden plough, representing agriculture and tradition, in the upper left, and a golden gear wheel, representing industry and progress, in the lower right partition.

=== Twin town ===
Tamm is currently twinned with Althofen, Kärnten, Austria.

== Traffic and transportation ==
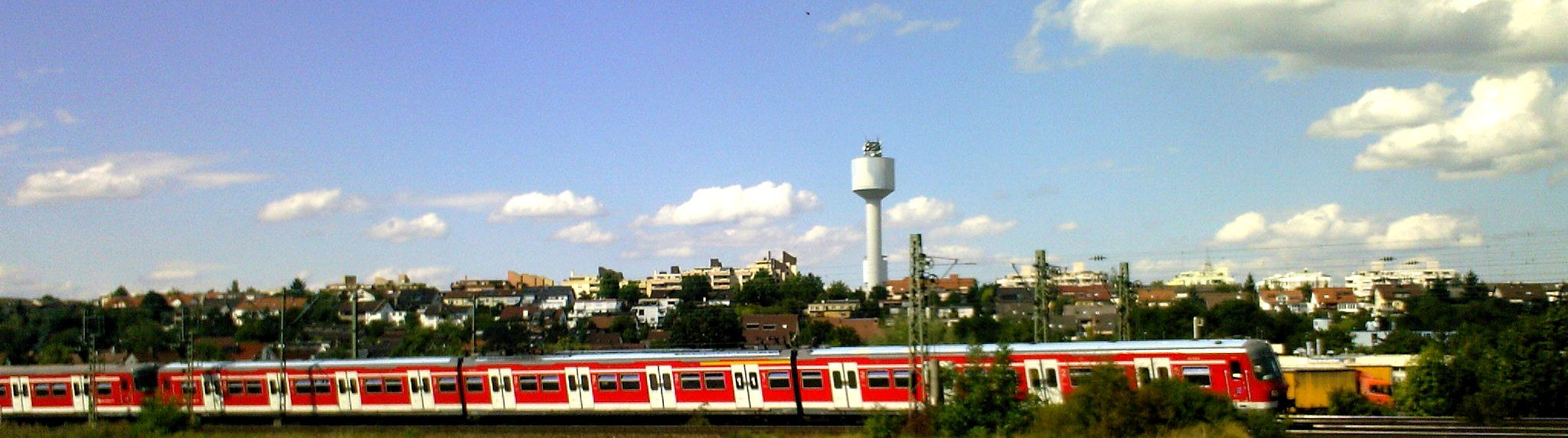
Stuttgart S-Bahn train in Tamm

Tamm lies directly adjacent to both federal highway B 27 and autobahn A 81 (Exit Ludwigsburg-Nord), both running between Stuttgart and Heilbronn. Landstraße (highway) L 1110 connects to Asperg and Bissingen, Kreisstraße (district road) K 1671 links Tamm with Markgröningen and Bietigheim. One curious side note is that there are almost no traffic lights in Tamm - most much-frequented intersections have been replaced by roundabouts.

Tamm station is also on the Franconia Railway and is served by the Stuttgart S-Bahn system, being the second-to-last outbound stop of line S5 to Bietigheim. Trains leave every half-hour from 4:40 a.m. to 12:40 a.m., travel time to Stuttgart Hauptbahnhof is 23 minutes. A bus line (RBS line 536) commutes between the station and the "Breuningerland" mall via Hohenstange suburb.

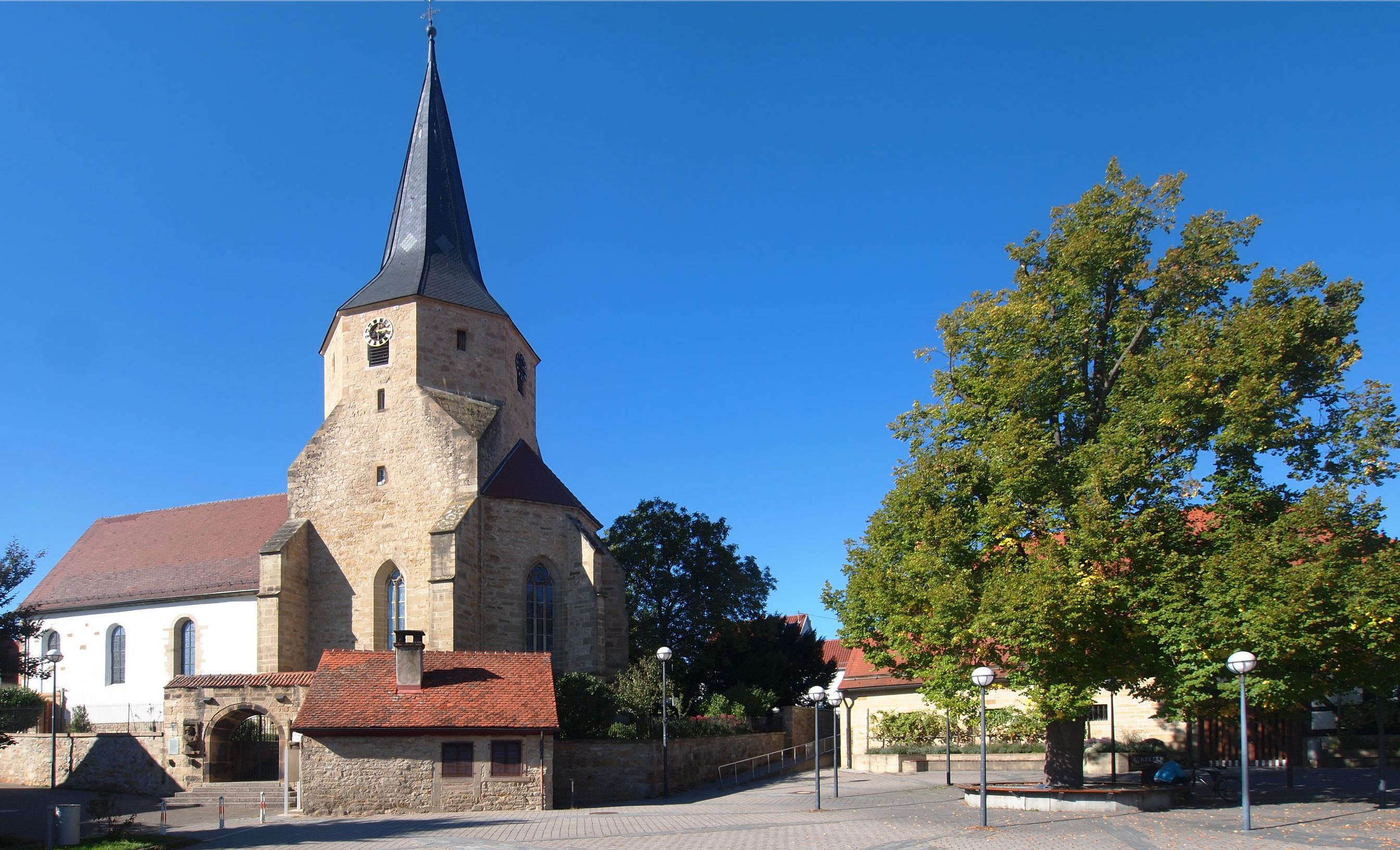
Church and wine press house

== Places of interest ==
Sights and landmarks of Tamm include the Wassertürme (water towers), which can be seen for miles around, the medieval fortified church of Saint Bartholomew, surrounded by historical Fachwerkhäuser (half-timbered houses), the new town square with the new town hall, and the modern glass-and-steel S-Bahn station.

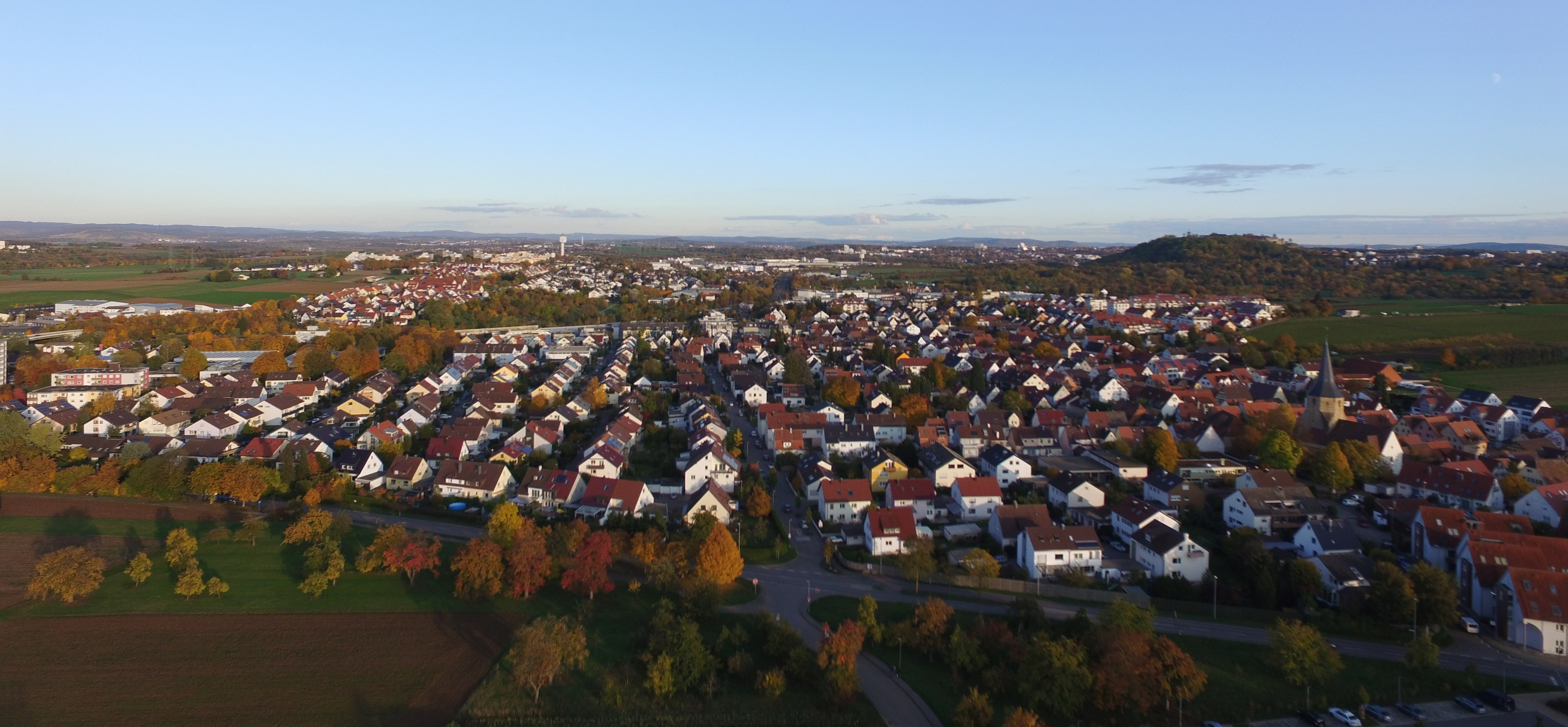
Panorama of Tamm, 24 Oktober 2020
