= Poison control center =

Over-the-phone medical service

A poison control center is a medical service that is able to provide immediate, free, and expert treatment advice and assistance over the telephone in case of exposure to poisonous or hazardous substances. Poison control centers answer questions about potential poisons in addition to providing treatment management advice about household products, medicines, pesticides, plants, bites and stings, food poisoning, and fumes. In the US, more than 72% of poison exposure cases are managed by phone, greatly reducing the need for costly emergency department and doctor visits.

== History ==
After World War II there was a proliferation of new drugs and chemicals in the marketplace, and consequently suicide and childhood poisonings from these agents drastically increased. Around this time up to half of all accidents in children were poisonings with a substantial number of fatalities. These factors led to the medical community developing a response to both unintentional and intentional poisonings. In Europe in the late 1940s special toxicology wards were set up; initial wards were started in Copenhagen and Budapest, and the Netherlands began a poison information service.

In the United States during the 1930s, Louis Gdalman, a pharmacist knowledgeable in the chemistry of harmful substances, set up a poison information service at St. Luke's Hospital (Chicago, Illinois). He became known around Chicago and the country as the person to contact in a poisoning case and would take calls at home around the clock. In the late 1940s, Gdalman began to organize the poison information onto note cards and created a standardized form to collect new information on new toxic substances. By 1953 he had collected an extensive library of information on thousands of poisons and he established the first Poison Control Center along with Edward Press. By 1957 there were 17 poison control centers in the US, with the Chicago center serving as a model; these centers dealt mainly with physician enquiries by giving ingredient and toxicity information about products, along with treatment recommendations. Over time the poison control centers started taking calls from the general public. The majority of poison centers were not part of a patient treatment facility; they strictly provided information.

In 1958 the American Association of Poison Control Centers (AAPCC) was founded to promote cooperation between poison centers in different cities and to standardize the operation of these centers. In 2022, AAPCC formally changed their name to America's Poison Centers. An additional part of the America's Poison Centers' activities is poison prevention and education programs for both physicians and the general public. In 1968 the American Academy of Clinical Toxicologists (AACT) was established by a group of medical doctors. The AACT's main objective was to apply principles of toxicology to patient treatment and improve the standard of care on a national basis. In the 1960s and 1970s a rapid proliferation of poison centers emerged and by 1978 there were 661 centers in the USA. This trend reversed during the 1980s and 1990s with a number of centers closing or merging. In 2000 there were 51 certified centers in the USA. As of 2006 there are 55 centers operating in the US.

A 2019 study conducted for America's Poison Centers showed that every dollar invested in the poison center system saves $13.39 in health care costs and productivity.

While poison control centers have traditionally provided expert consultations by telephone, on 30 December 2014 an online option was launched by a group of US poison centers to meet the growing demand for accurate web-based health information. Based on age, weight, amount, route, symptom status and substance implicated, it provides case-specific guidance for poison exposures. The webPOISONCONTROL application uses ingredient-based algorithms to generate a recommendation including whether an emergency department visit or call to poison control is required. If it's safe to stay home, then home treatment recommendations, specific symptoms to expect, and symptoms of greater concern that would require a call to poison control or a visit to an emergency department are outlined.

=== Europe ===
A similar movement evolved in Europe but unlike the American movement the majority were centralized toxicology treatment centers with integrated poison information centers. The French developed an inpatient unit for the treatment of poisoned patients in the late 1950s. In England the National Poison Information Service was developed at Guy's Hospital under Dr Roy Goulding. At around the same time Dr Henry Mathew started a poison treatment center in Edinburgh. In 1964 the European Association for Poison Control Centers was formed at Tours, France. Australasian centers were also established in the 1960s. The New Zealand center started in Dunedin in December 1964, while in Australia, the New South Wales Poisons Information Center was established in 1966.

Article 45 of the CLP Regulation places the duty upon Member States to appoint "bodies responsible for receiving information relating to emergency health response". These appointed bodies are often known as Poison Centres.

Since 2020–25, hazardous product manufacturers in the European Economic Area (EEA) are required to send the formulation of their products to the European Chemicals Agency (ECHA) and to print a unique formula identifier (UFI) code on their products. This code lets poison centers know the exact formulation of a product, while the formulation is only shared to the ECHA and attached poison control centers.

== Countries ==
=== Australia ===
In Australia, New South Wales, Victoria, Western Australia, and Queensland have dedicated Poisons Information Centres staffed by specially-trained pharmacists. The Western Australia centre also provides services to South Australia. In Tasmania and other Australian territories, the NSW centre provides equivalent services. All centres are accessed through one number, 13 11 26, and are available 24/7.

=== Belgium and Luxembourg ===
The Belgian Antipoison Centre (Centre Antipoisons in French, Antigifcentrum in Dutch) is tasked with receiving and answering urgent calls for medical advice regarding cases of poisoning 24/7 and throughout the year. Its hotline can be reached on the telephone number 070 245 245 in Belgium and is available to both medical professionals and the general public. To be able to answer the calls qualitatively, the Antipoison Centre manages a database with formulas of dangerous mixtures provided by the industry, and a database of relevant scientific literature in the field of toxicology. The Antipoison Centre is also responsible for keeping a stock of certain rare or expensive antidotes, and managing a network of hospital pharmacies that also have certain antidotes in stock. Lastly, the Antipoison Centre has a mission of toxicovigilance, meaning it warns relevant authorities (such as the FPS Public Health, Food Chain Safety and Environment or the FAMHP) about new and emerging risks of chemicals and pharmaceuticals involved in cases of poisoning. Since 2015, the Grand Duchy of Luxembourg has an agreement with Belgium to have the Antipoison Centre also function as the poison control center for Luxembourg. Medical professionals and members of the public from Luxembourg can reach the Antipoison Centre on the telephone number 8002 5500.

=== Egypt ===
The Poison Control Centre of Ain Shams University (PCC-ASU) was established in 1981. It is one of the earliest poisoning treatment facilities to be established in the Middle East. It has its own inpatient department, ICU and Analytical Toxicology unit. It serves between 20 and 25 thousand cases a year.

=== Germany ===
Germany has seven designated poison control centers, some serving several states. Calling the centers is free of charge for members of the public. Some centers charge a fee for calls by hospitals or other medical professionals.

- Baden-Württemberg: Poison Information Center of the Medical Center - University of Freiburg: (0761) 19 240
- Bavaria: Poison Control Center - University Hospital rechts der Isar (Munich): (089) 19 240
- Berlin, Brandenburg: Charité Poison Control Center (Berlin): (030) 19 240
- Bremen, Hamburg, Lower Saxony, Schleswig-Holstein: Poison Information Center Nord (Göttingen): (0551) 19 240
- Hesse, Rhineland-Palatinate, Saarland: Poison Information Center of the University Medical Center Mainz: (06131) 19 240
- Mecklenburg-Vorpommern, Saxony, Saxony-Anhalt, Thuringia: Joint Poison Information Center Erfurt: (0361) 730 730
- North Rhine-Westphalia: Poison Information Center Bonn: (0228) 19 240

=== India ===
- A Poison Control Centre with poison information service and analytical lab service has been established in Amrita Institute of Medical Sciences, Cochin, Kerala. This Poison Control Centre at Amrita Institute of Medical Sciences plays a pivotal role in the prompt diagnosis, treatment, and prevention of poisonings, offering essential support to both healthcare professionals and the general public.
- In April 2018, a Poison Information Center was established in Kolkata, in the Department of Forensic Medicine and Toxicology at R. G. Kar Medical College. The Center usually caters to patients as well as the doctors from the entire state of West Bengal, in addition to other parts of India. The toll free number is 1800-345-0033.
- National Poisons Information Centre in the Department of Pharmacology at All India Institute of Medical Sciences, New Delhi. The toll free number is 1800-116-117.
- Poison Information Center at All India Institute of Medical Sciences, Bhopal. The toll free number is 1800-2333-1122.
- Poisons Information Centre at Christian Medical College Vellore. The toll free number is 1800-425-1213.

=== Italy ===
The Istituto Superiore di Sanità (ISS) (National Institute of Health) is responsible for poison control in Italy.

=== Malta ===
The Malta National Poisons Centre (MNPC) provides a national poisons helpline 1774 that is open to the public from every day between 8:00 and 20:00. It is located in the Malta Life Sciences Park, San Ġwann.

=== Netherlands ===
The National Poisons Information Centre (NVIC) of the University Medical Center Utrecht provides a 24/7 hotline service (030-2748888), staffed by poison information specialists (SPIs). It is open to medical professionals only and is not available to the general public.

Since 2011 the NVIC also provides a web-based exposure analysis and poison information system. As with the webPOISONCONTROL system, this is a free-of-charge, fully confidential web application that enables medical professionals to quickly and efficiently assess the potential risks of (mixed) exposures, as well as their clinical signs and symptoms, and possible therapeutic interventions. As with the other online options worldwide, it remains advisable to consult the NVIC if the exposure is to a larger number of substances.

The NVIC can, on request, also provide specific training to emergency medical personnel (GMTs), emergency departments, physicians and their assistants, and other interested parties with regards to exposure prevention and management. The NVIC was part of the National Institute for Public Health and the Environment until 2011. It was then transferred to the University Medical Center Utrecht.

=== Palestine ===
The Palestinian Poison Control and Drug Information Centre was established in 2006, by Ansam Sawalha.

=== Saudi Arabia ===
The poison control department in King Fahad Medical City provides its service for healthcare professionals 24/7 throughout the year.

=== Sweden ===
Giftinformationscentralen is responsible for poison control in Sweden.

=== United Kingdom ===
The National Poisons Information Service (NPIS) provides toxicological information to health professionals to ensure patients receive appropriate treatment. NPIS does not take calls from the general public, who are instead advised to contact the non-emergency 111 number for specific information on poisons, or 999 in an emergency.

=== United States ===
America's Poison Centers manages a 24-hour hotline (1-800-222-1222), which is continuously staffed by pharmacists, physicians, nurses, and poison information specialists who have received dedicated training in the field of toxicology. Calls to the number are automatically routed to the Poison Center that covers the territory from which the call is placed. It has a TTY/TDD number for the hearing impaired. Poison educators across the country also offer poison prevention training and education sessions to community institutions, along with educational materials.

== See also ==
- Mr. Yuk
- Child-resistant packaging
