= Women in Science Hall of Fame (U.S. State Department) =

Women in Science Hall of Fame was established in 2010 by the U.S. State Department Environment, Science, Technology, and Health Hub for the Middle East and North Africa to recognize the exceptional women scientists in this region of the world.

Annual awards were made 2011-2015 and coordinated by the U.S. Embassy in Amman, Jordan.
