= Gundelfingen (Breisgau) station =

Railway station in Breisgau, Germany

Gundelfingen (Breisgau)
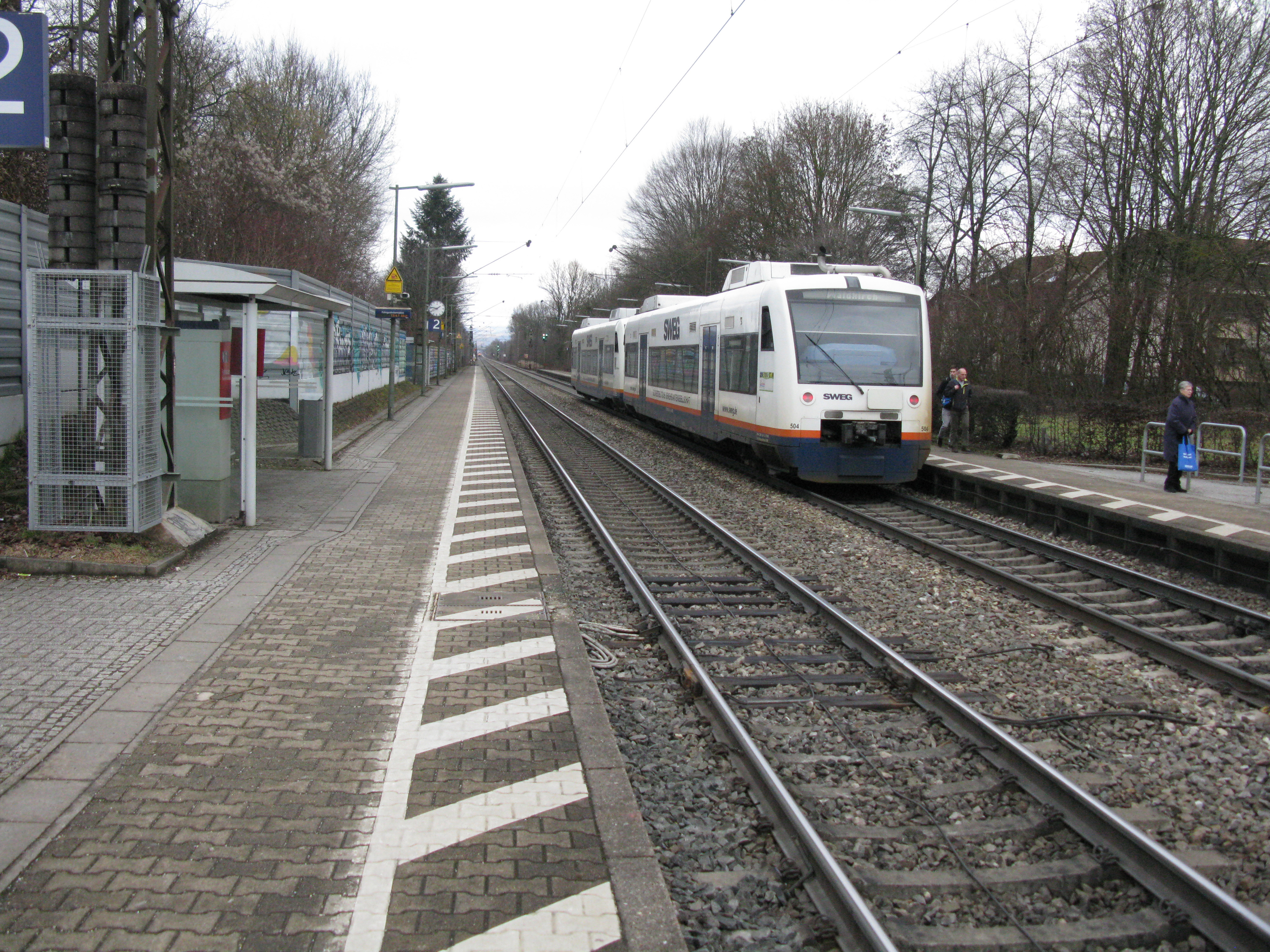
- Breisgau S-Bahn service in Gundelfingen station

General information
- Location: Rosenstr. 18, Gundelfingen, Baden-Württemberg; Germany
- Coordinates: 48°02′41″N 7°52′28″E
- Elevation: 241 m (791 ft)
- Owner: Deutsche Bahn
- Operator: DB Netz; DB Station&Service
- Lines: Mannheim–Karlsruhe–Basel railway (km 202.6) (KBS 703); Freight bypass railway (km 0.0) (KBS 726)
- Platforms: 2

Construction
- Accessible: Yes

Other information
- Station code: 2412
- DS100 code: RGDN
- IBNR: 8002465
- Category: 5
- Fare zone: RVF: A
- Website: www.bahnhof.de

History
- Opened: 30 July 1845

Services
Preceding station	DB Regio Baden-Württemberg	Following station
Denzlingen towards Offenburg	RB 26	Freiburg Hbf Terminus
Preceding station	Breisgau S-Bahn	Following station
Denzlingen towards Elzach	S2	Freiburg-Zähringen towards Freiburg Hbf
Location

Gundelfingen station is a railway station in Gundelfingen in Baden-Württemberg, Germany. It lies on the Mannheim–Karlsruhe–Basel railway (Rhine Valley Railway). The Freiburg bypass, which is reserved for freight traffic, branches off south of the station. It is served by Breisgau S-Bahn (BSB) and DB Regio trains and has two side platforms. DB designates it as a class 5 station.

== History ==
Gundelfingen station was established on 30 July 1845 with the opening of the Offenburg–Freiburg Hbf section of the Rhine Valley Railway from Mannheim to Basel via Karlsruhe.

The freight bypass branching off in Gundelfingen was inaugurated on 4 September 1905 to relieve traffic at Freiburg Hauptbahnhof.

The entire route of the Rhine Valley Railway, including Gundelfingen station, was electrified In 1955.

== Operations ==
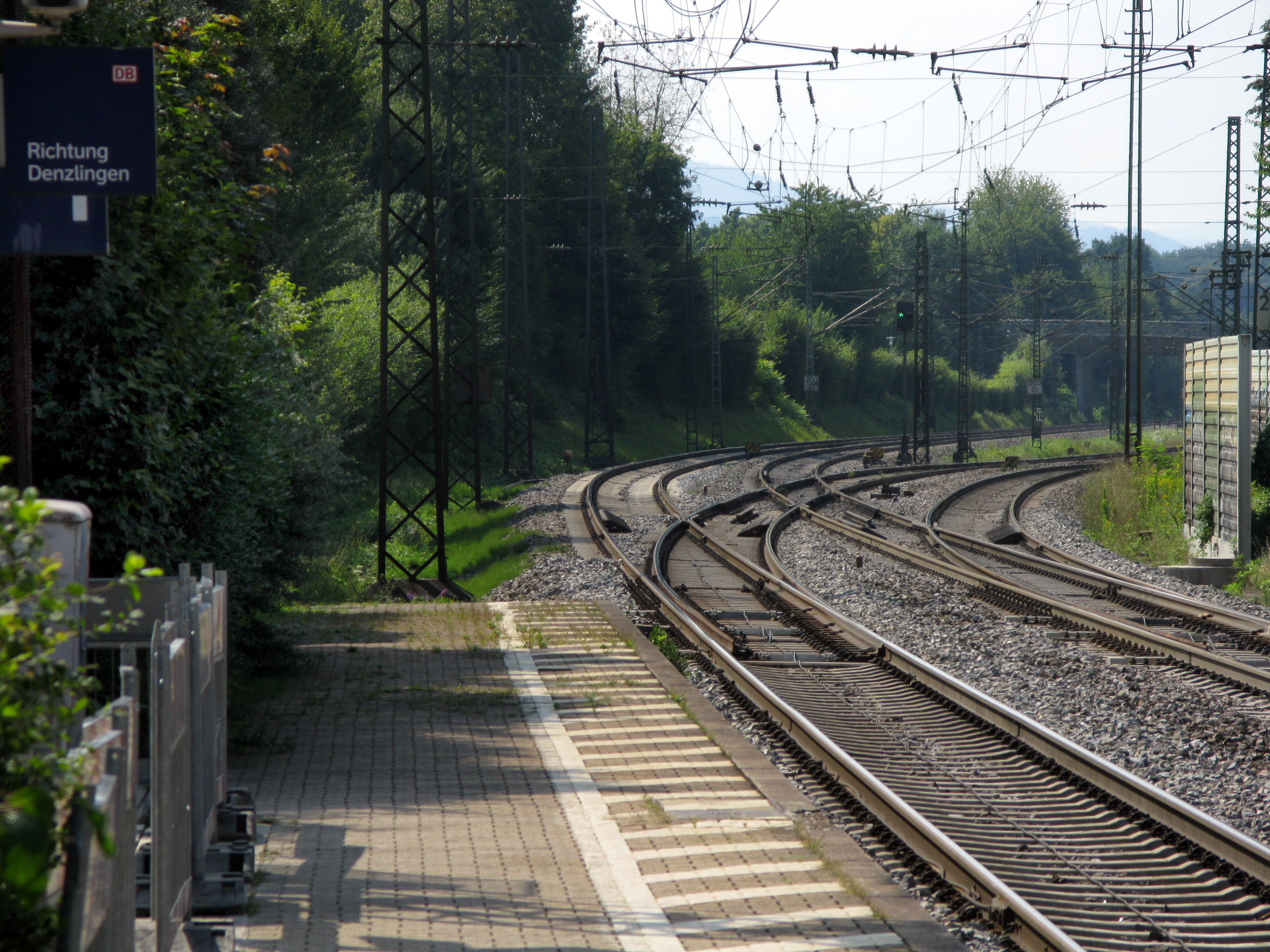
Junction with the Freiburg freight bypass railway (right) at Gundelfingen

Around 100 DB Regio and Breisgau S-Bahn trains stop in Gundelfingen every day. There are direct connections to Basel, Freiburg im Breisgau, Offenburg, Karlsruhe, Waldkirch and Elzach. The municipality belongs to Regio-Verkehrsverbund Freiburg (Freiburg Regional Transport Association, RVF), which administers local services and fares.

=== Long-distance services ===
No long-distance services stop in Gundelfingen. The closest station served by long-distance traffic is Freiburg (Breisgau) Hauptbahnhof.

=== Local services ===
Gundelfingen is almost exclusively served by Breisgau S-Bahn services from Freiburg via Gundelfingen, Denzlingen and Waldkirch to Elzach every 30 to 60 minutes.

Regional-Express services between Offenburg and Basel as well as Regionalbahn services between Basel or Neuenburg and Offenburg, sometimes extended to/from Karlsruhe, occasionally stop in Gundelfingen.

Train class	Route	Frequency
RE 7	Offenburg – Lahr (Schwarzw) – Emmendingen – Denzlingen – Gundelfingen (Breisgau) – Freiburg (Breisgau) – Schallstadt – Bad Krozingen – Müllheim (Baden) – Basel Bad Bf (– Basel SBB)	Some services
RB 26	Gundelfingen (Breisgau) – Freiburg (Breisgau) – Ebringen – Schallstadt – Bad Krozingen – Heitersheim – Müllheim (Baden) – Neuenburg (Baden) / Basel Bad Bf	Every 60 minutes
S2	Elzach – Waldkirch – Denzlingen – Gundelfingen (Breisgau) – Freiburg (Breisgau)	Every 30 minutes (to/from Waldkirch) every 30/60 minutes (to/from Elzach)

=== Freight transport ===
Gundelfingen junction is located directly south of the station. There, the sometimes dense north-south freight traffic is routed to the Freiburg freight bypass railway.

=== Bus services ===
Bus routes 15, 16 (both Gundelfingen–Wildtal–Zähringen–Freiburg) and bus route 24 (Gundelfingen–Freiburg Industriegebiet Nord) run from Gundelfingen station. These are operated by Freiburger Verkehrs AG. Regional buses are operated by Südbadenbus over a wider area.
