= Freiburg Hauptbahnhof =

German railway station

Freiburg (Breisgau) Hbf
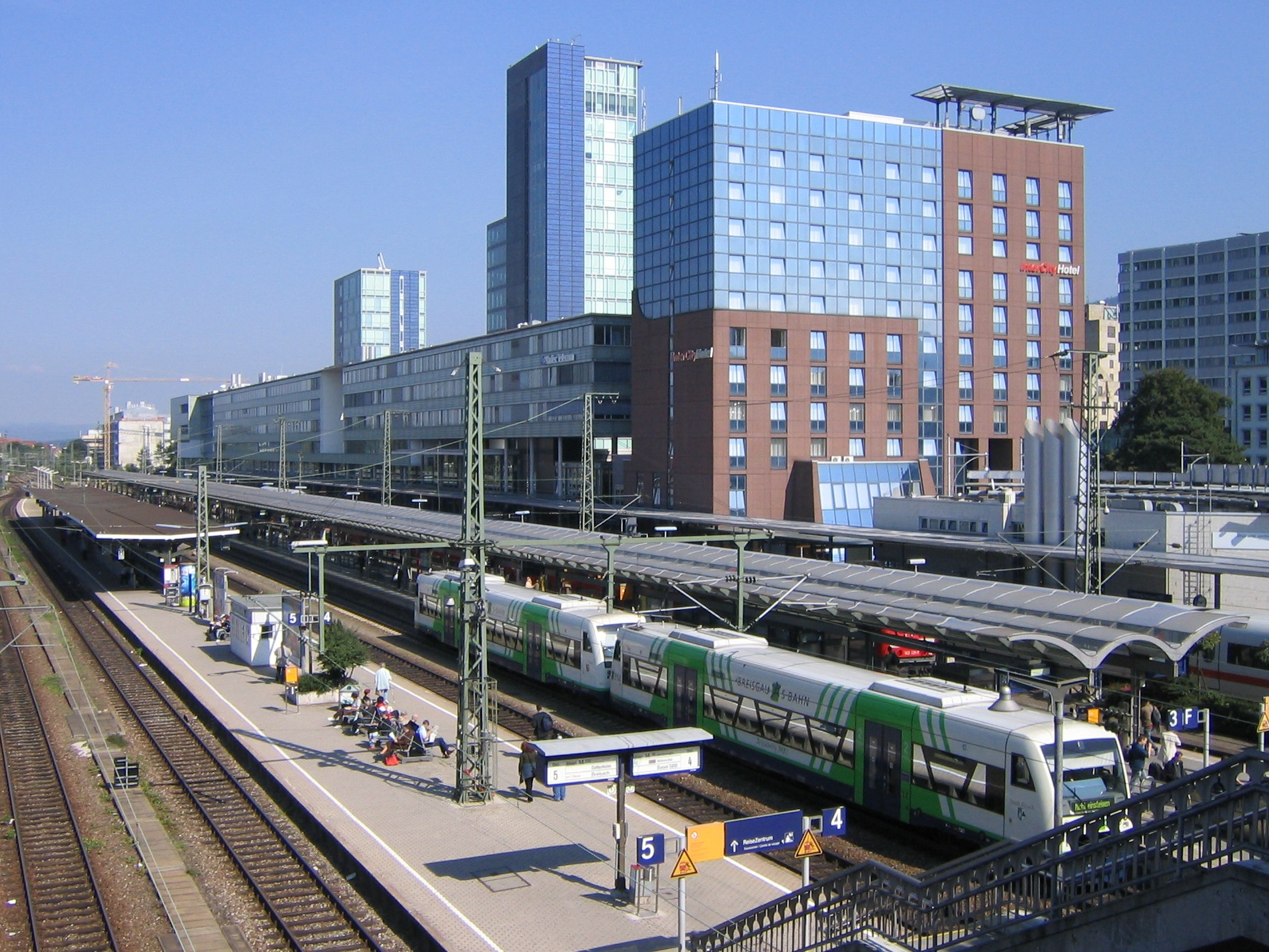
- View from the railway bridge over the tracks and station complex

General information
- Location: Freiburg im Breisgau, Baden-Württemberg; Germany
- Coordinates: 47°59′52″N 7°50′31″E
- Lines: Breisach Railway; Elz Valley Railway; Hell Valley Railway; Rhine Valley Railway
- Platforms: 8 (long distance); 2 (regional)

Construction
- Accessible: Yes
- Architect: Harter + Kanzler
- Architectural style: Functionalism

Other information
- Station code: 1893
- DS100 code: RF
- IBNR: 8000107
- Category: 2
- Fare zone: RVF: A
- Website: www.bahnhof.de

History
- Opening: 30 July 1845; 181 years ago; 1949 (rebuilt); 1999 (current)
- Electrified: 18 June 1936; 90 years ago

Passengers
- 45,000 regional; 15,000 long distance; 12,000 visitors to the station
Services
| Preceding station | DB Fernverkehr | Following station |
|---|---|---|
| Offenburg towards Berlin Ostbahnhof | ICE 12 | Basel Bad Bf towards Brig, Chur or Interlaken Ost |
| Baden-Baden towards Hamburg Hbf | ICE/ECE 20 | Basel Bad Bf towards Basel SBB |
| Offenburg towards Hamburg-Altona or Amsterdam Centraal | ICE 43 | Basel Bad Bf towards Basel SBB, Chur or Brig |
| Offenburg towards München Hbf | ICE 60 | Müllheim (Baden) towards Basel SBB |
| Ringsheim/Europa-Park towards Frankfurt (Main) Hbf | ECE 85 EuroCity-Express | Basel Bad Bf towards Milano Centrale |
| Preceding station | ÖBB | Following station |
| Offenburg towards Amsterdam Centraal | Nightjet | Basel Bad Bf towards Zürich HB |
| Offenburg towards Hamburg-Altona | Nightjet | Basel Bad Bf towards Zürich HB |
| Offenburg towards Berlin Hbf | Nightjet | Basel Bad Bf towards Zürich HB |
| Preceding station | SNCF | Following station |
| Ringsheim/Europa-Park towards Paris-Est | TGV inOui | Terminus |
| Ringsheim/Europa-Park towards Bordeaux | TGV inOui | Terminus |
| Preceding station | DB Regio Baden-Württemberg | Following station |
| Denzlingen towards Karlsruhe Hbf | RE 7 | Schallstadt towards Basel Bad Bf |
| Gundelfingen (Breisgau) towards Offenburg | RB 26 | Terminus |
| Denzlingen towards Emmendingen | RB 27 | Freiburg-St. Georgen towards Basel Bad Bf or Neuenburg (Baden) |
| Terminus | RB 28 | Müllheim (Baden) towards Mulhouse-Ville |
| Preceding station | Breisgau S-Bahn | Following station |
| Freiburg Klinikum towards Breisach | S1 | Freiburg-Wiehre towards Seebrugg |
| Terminus | S10 | Freiburg-Wiehre towards Villingen (Schwarzwald) |
| Freiburg Klinikum towards Endingen am Kaiserstuhl | S11 | Freiburg-Wiehre towards Neustadt (Schwarzw) |
| Freiburg-Herdern towards Elzach | S2 | Terminus |
| Preceding station | Freiburg (Breisgau) tram | Following station |
| Eschholzstraße towards Landwasser | 1 | Stadttheater towards Littenweiler |
| Eschholzstraße towards Hornusstraße | 2 | Stadttheater towards Günterstal |
| Eschholzstraße towards Haid | 3 | Stadttheater towards Zähringen |
| Eschholzstraße towards Freiburg Messe | 4 | Stadttheater towards Vauban |
Location

Freiburg Hauptbahnhof is the central railway station of the German city of Freiburg im Breisgau. The Rhine Valley Railway (Mannheim–Basel), Höllentalbahn ("Hell Valley Railway", Freiburg–Donaueschingen) and the Breisach Railway (Breisach–Freiburg) meet here.

The station is located on the western outskirts of the Old Town of Freiburg, about a kilometre from Freiburg Minster at 5–7 Bismarckallee. This street is also fronted by the Freiburg concert hall (Konzerthaus Freiburg), several hotels and the Jazzhaus Freiburg jazz club and the Xpress office complex was built along the line in 2008.

The first station building was built in 1845 in the Rundbogenstil ("round arch style"), with Romanesque Revival elements. A temporary station built after the destruction of the station in 1944/45 lasted 50 years. This was replaced around the turn of the 21st century with an ensemble of buildings, including the station hall, a shopping mall, hotels and office blocks. With around 38,300 passengers per day, in 2005 it was the fifth largest railway station in Baden-Württemberg.

It is a Category 2 station serving southern Baden-Württemberg.

== History ==
=== Construction and inauguration of the 19th century ===
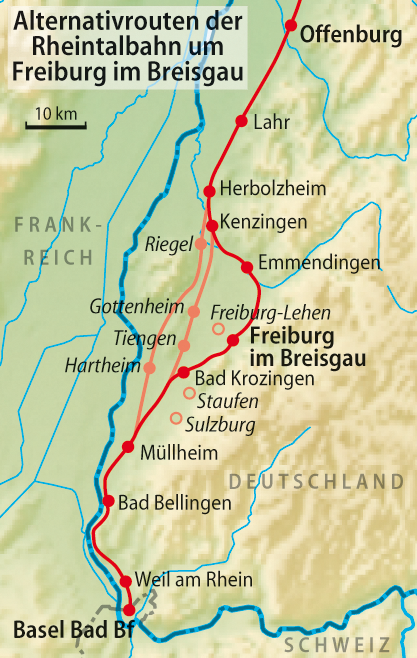
The routes of the Baden Mainline and the alternatives originally proposed bypassing Freiburg

The construction of the Baden Mainline from Mannheim to Basel was approved at an extraordinary meeting of the Baden parliament in 1838. The first bill, presented by the Minister of State Georg Ludwig von Winter on 13 February 1838, contained no information about the places to be connected. This draft was referred to a commission, which presented its findings on 5 March. Deputy Karl Georg Hoffmann (1796–1865) introduced a motion during the debate that provided, among other things, 500,000 South German gulden to avoid Freiburg being left off the route of the line. The final version of the "Act for the construction of a railway from Mannheim to the Swiss border near Basel" (Gesetzes betr. die Erbauung einer Eisenbahn von Mannheim bis an die Schweizer Grenze bei Basel), which was signed by the Baden Grand Duke Leopold at the end of March 1838, included a provision explicitly stating that the line would run through Freiburg.

Although Freiburg was described as the main trading centre of upper Baden at the time, there was more political debate and more consideration of options by the railway planners than in relation to any other city of the Grand Duchy. There were two major challenges to the integration of Freiburg with the, originally single-track, line between Offenburg and Basel: The city of Freiburg is not only away from a relatively straight line between Mannheim and Basel, it is also higher than any other city on the Rhine Valley Railway north of Haltingen and in particular it was 308 Baden feet or 92.4 metres (303 ft 2 in) higher than Kenzingen, which is located 25 kilometres (16 mi) to the north. Alternative routes through the Rhine Valley that omitted Freiburg, running either from Riegel to Hartheim or from Kenzingen to Biengen near Bad Krozingen, would have been much shorter and would not have involved the gradients required to climb to the Freiburger Bucht (the lowlands around Freiburg) at the foot of the Black Forest.

The commission's proposal for the construction of the line to begin in Mannheim, Freiburg and Isteiner Klotz (a hill south of Schliengen) had not come about. The commission wanted to wait to benefit from the experience of the construction of the line from Mannheim and found that this approach facilitated the work while also allowed a degree of flexibility in the operation of the line. According to the law of 1838 work should have started immediately, at least preliminary work, so "that the progress of the railway is stopped nowhere" (daß die Bahn in ihrem Fortschreiten nirgends aufgehalten wird). After a proposal to build a passenger station at a site in Lehen in the area of the current A 5 autobahn was excluded as being located too far from Freiburg, it decided to build the line immediately west of the city through the "Vauban belt", the flat zone previously kept clear for firing cannon-shot from the fortifications (Festungsrayon) designed by Sébastien Le Prestre de Vauban. There was plenty of space for an extensive network of tracks. This solution, however, required a grade of 1:171 (0.58%, according to other sources 0.53%), the largest grade on the Baden mainline. This required levelling of the route from Köndringen, continuing to the south to Schallstadt.

The railway reached Offenburg on 1 June 1844 and construction began on the section from Riegel to Freiburg in 1841. In 1843, the cornerstone was laid for the station in Freiburg; this ceremony involved the transportation of the locomotive, Der Rhein of the Maschinenbau-Gesellschaft Karlsruhe ("Karlsruhe Engineering Works") over the highway to Freiburg. On 22 July 1845, the first trial train to Freiburg ran with six carriages, hauled by the locomotive, Der Kaiserstuhl of Baden class IIIc. Another trial followed on 26 July with the locomotive Keppler, which hauled 700 passengers in 21 carriages to Freiburg.

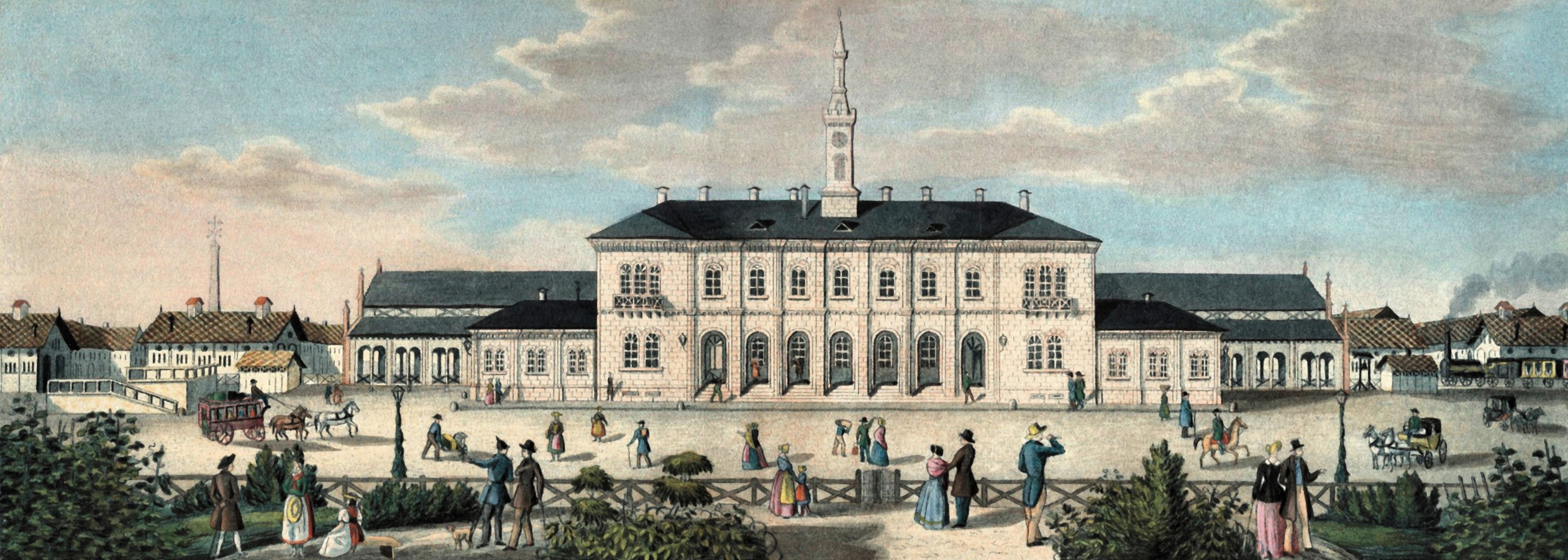
The station at its completion in 1845

On 30 July 1845 the station was opened in the presence of Grand Duke Leopold and his son Prince Frederick. Apart from politicians, such as the Baden Foreign Minister, Alexander von Dusch, the Minister for the Interior, Karl Friedrich Nebenius and Frederick Rettig, officials, mayors and officers of the town guards (Bürgerwehr) of the local towns travelled on a train hauled by the locomotive, Zähringen, with musical accompaniment by the guards regiment, which had already travelled over the line. When the train arrived in Freiburg at 12.40, Mayor Friedrich Wagner welcomed the guests at the still unfinished station building, while cannons on the Schlossberg fired a salute.

As early as August 1845, 1,474 passengers used the new express-line carriages to Freiburg and 1,682 passengers departed the city by train, which now operated five services per day. While the stagecoach service between Freiburg and Offenburg closed with the opening of the railway line, stagecoaches ran three times each day between Basel and Freiburg, each way. Franz Liszt is believed to have been one of the first famous passengers to use Freiburg station; he travelled on 16 October 1845 from Heidelberg to Freiburg in order to give a concert the next day. Freight operations also began in the summer of 1845.

With the completion of the section south to Schliengen in 1847, the temporary terminal station with two terminating tracks was converted into a through station with two continuing platform tracks, which were both required to deal with the increased volume of traffic. The rail link north to Rastatt and Karlsruhe played a decisive role in the Baden Revolution of 1848 and in its defeat in Breisgau by loyalists and Hessian troops and their heavy military equipment, which were quickly moved to Freiburg.

=== Extensions to the First World War ===
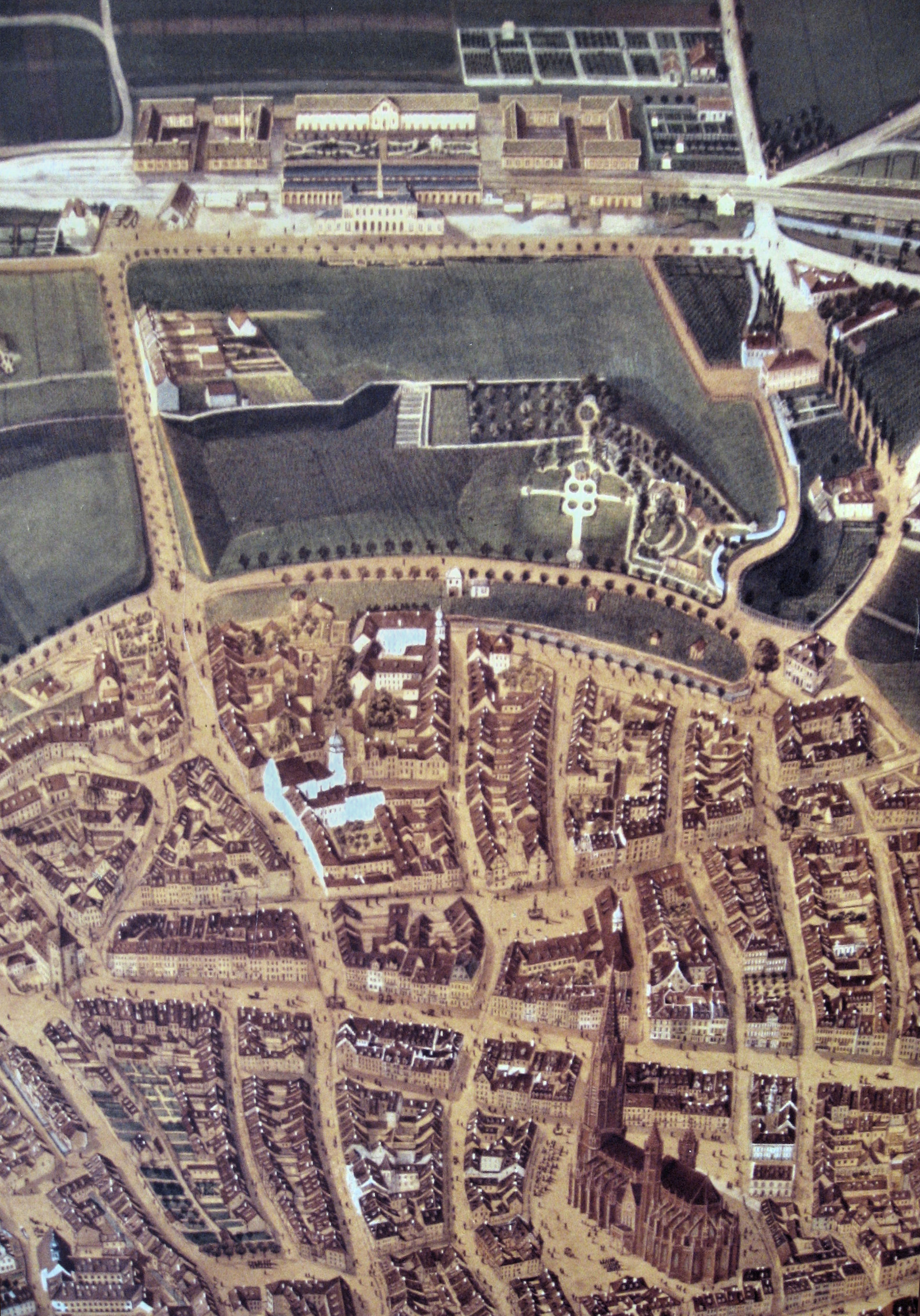
The Lerch plan of 1852 with the city of Freiburg, which is still surrounded by the remains of the fortifications of Vauban, and the station at the top (west)

The "station at Freiburg" (Bahnhof bei Freiburg) was initially outside the city, as shown in the plan by Joseph Wilhelm Lerch of 1852. It was initially accessible only via the extended Bertoldstraße, until the completion of the entrance building on Eisenbahnstraße (railway street) in 1861. The construction of the railway station led to Freiburg finally growing out of the confines of the fortress. Hotels, restaurants and the central post office were built in the Vauban belt along Eisenbahnstraße and a landscaped area was established between the city and the station. The city of Freiburg implemented a zoning plan called Hinterm Bahnhof ("behind the station"), leading to the development of the current Stühlinger quarter. Commercial operations and factories were soon established there, some of which were displaced from the now residential areas of Herder and Wiehre.

During the 1870s, the Baden Railway expanded the station with waiting rooms, utility rooms and a courtyard. As a result of the annexation of Alsace after the Franco-Prussian War in 1871, Alsace-Lorraine was quickly connected to the rail network by the Freiburg–Colmar railway, which made a third platform track and second platform necessary. The Elz Valley Railway branching from the Rhine Valley Railway in Denzlingen opened to Waldkirch in 1875 and was extended to Elzach in 1901.

In 1885, rail transport in Freiburg had increased so much that the old station hall was demolished and two new halls were built. The level crossing was replaced by a bridge, then called the Kaiser Wilhelm bridge and now called Wiwilí bridge, after Freiburg's sister city in Nicaragua. Two underpasses were created during the renovation of 1885/86; these still exist today and lead to stairs connecting to each platform.

Schematic representation of the three railway lines in the 19th century, the railway freight bypass and the stations

The station was named Hauptbahnhof ("main station") following the opening of the Hell Valley Railway (Höllentalbahn) and Freiburg Wiehre station in 1887.

Freight warehouses and loading areas in the station hardly increased in the late 19th century despite an increase of about 20 percent of traffic since 1878. Therefore, between 1901 and 1905, a separate freight yard and an 11-kilometre-long (6.8 mi) freight bypass line was built between Gundelfingen and Leutersberg for the relief of the main line.

=== Growth during the Weimar Republic ===
Ticket sales between 1900 and 1935

The station facilities for handling passengers were often criticised from the beginning of the 20th century. Complaints were made about the lack of platform tracks, which meant that arriving and waiting trains often had to share one of the three tracks. This could be a source of danger, as was shown, for example, in 1924, when a departing suburban train ran into another train that had run early and was waiting in the station. Also, the station was the target of criticism and the Freiburger Zeitung newspaper called it a "mousetrap". The passenger volume also increased massively in parallel with the population growth of Freiburg. Ticket sales in 1919 had almost doubled from the 1,340,954 tickets sold in 1900.

Therefore, in 1910 there were plans for a complete rebuild of the station. The initial plans called for an entrance hall crowned by a dome and with a natural stone frontage, which would have been 90 metres (295 ft 3 in) wide and 8 metres (26 ft 3 in) deep. However, with planning almost complete, construction was delayed "until further notice" by the outbreak of the First World War. The necessary preparatory work for the new construction, the complete separation of passenger and luggage movements, was still completed.

It took until 1929 to establish an operations and locomotive depot between the Dreisam river and Basler Straße. This made it possible to create space for additional tracks and platforms since the locomotive sheds and workshops that had been located west of the station could now be moved to the new depot, which is now on the site of the DB Regio workshop in Freiburg. The space created was used for the construction of two more platforms in 1929 and 1938. The first of the two new platforms had a width of 8 metres (26 ft 3 in) and a length of 270 metres (885 ft 10 in). The drain on the roof was initially installed in the centre and was no longer on the roof's slope. A postal lift was also installed with the construction of one of the new platforms.

Basler Straße was relocated in the course of the work by 50 metres (164 ft 1 in) to the side and lowered by about 6 metres (19 ft 8 in). This enabled the two tracks of the main line, a headshunt and the two separate tracks of the Höllentalbahn, which had been opened on 8 November 1934, to cross over the street on three new bridges. The most dangerous level crossings within the city had now been eliminated. Crossings removed earlier included those at Albertstraße (the underpass is now called Mathildenstraße), Lehener Straße (both replaced in 1905) and on the Höllentalbahn (replaced in 1934).

Despite the cramped conditions, luxury trains already passed through the station at this time: in the summer of 1901, the Amsterdam–Engadin Express began operating. It was not, however, destined for a long life. Much more successful was the launch of the Rheingold on 15 May 1928, which served the station until the beginning of the war on 1 September 1939, when it had recently run over the Gotthard as far as Naples. On 15 May 1939, the Reichsbahn began running high-speed railcars (Schnelltriebwagen) via Freiburg on the Basel–Dortmund route (FDt 49/50) (operated with DRB 137 273 ... 858 sets) and Basel–Berlin Anhalter Bahnhof (FDt 33/34); these were both discontinued at the outbreak of war.

=== Second World War and its aftermath ===
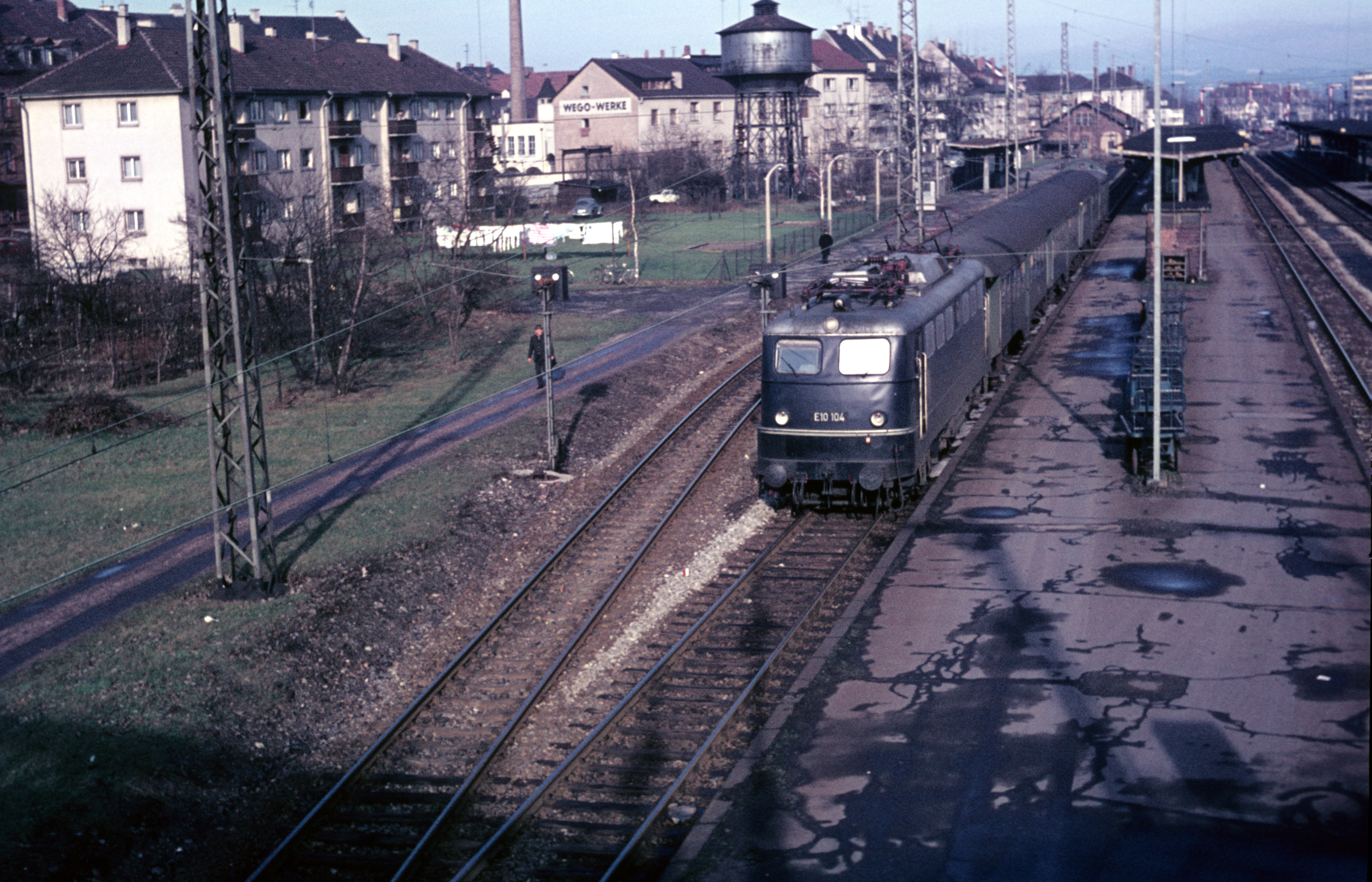
A class E 10 locomotive exiting with converted carriages at track 7 towards Titisee with the former water tower on Wentzingerstraße (about 1970)

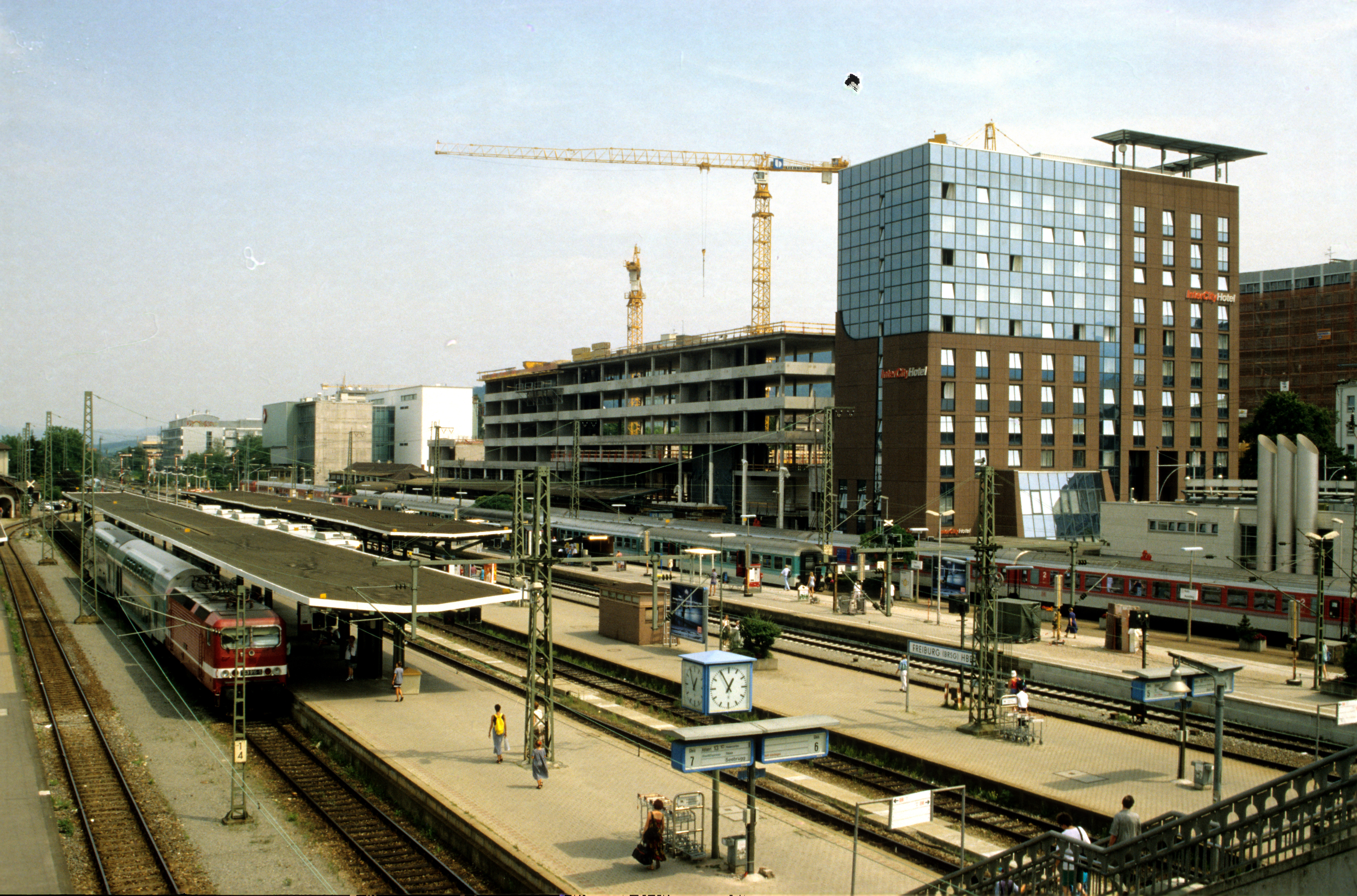
The first stage of the new Hauptbahnhof: construction of the entrance building.

The number of tickets sold in Freiburg plummeted before the war began as a result of the promotion of road transport during the Third Reich (for instance by building the autobahns). This decrease was further enhanced with the outbreak of war, as from 1940, the government ordered the Reichsbahn to reduce its operations over the line. The use of the line by civilian passengers had to be restricted because of the war. In March 1942, the Reich Ministry for Public Enlightenment and Propaganda threatened persons who used the congested strategic railway "for fun" with heavy penalties and even dispatch to concentration camps.

On the night of 21/22 October 1940, the district leadership in South Baden, as part of the Wagner-Bürckel Action, authorised 450 Jews from Freiburg and the former Freiburg district to be deported from the station's goods hall to the Gurs internment camp. Since 2003, there has been a memorial to the deportation on Wiwilí bridge.

As in the First World War, when no major damage had been caused to railway installations by the air raids of the French, the station was the target of bombing raids in the Second World War, including two major raids at the end of the war. This time, however, it felt the impact: the British air raid on the city on the evening of 27 November 1944, Operation Tigerfish, destroyed all the overhead line, the majority of the tracks and almost the entire main station building. The clock tower, which survived the raid intact, was toppled in another raid on 8 February 1945. Even the marshalling yard and the engine shed were badly affected.

Already in 1945, the U.S. occupation forces in their zone of occupation required the northern part of the Baden Mainline to be restored to operation. The line was returned to working order to Freiburg, on 7 September, and the line was restored to Basel on 5 November. However, the French occupation troops were ordered to dismantle one track of the Offenburg–Freiburg–Müllheim and Radolfzell–Konstanz sections to reduce the business on the now single-track right bank (that is east or north of the Rhine) line and thus increase traffic for the French National Railways (SNCF) on the left bank. In fact, this work was limited to the Offenburg–Denzlingen section and so Freiburg was spared from the dismantling. The number of trains running between Freiburg and Offenburg was now much less substantial than directly after the opening of the line, 100 years earlier. Moreover, Germans could only use third class on the majority of the few trains running until 14 May 1950. In 1952, there were again 12 pairs of expresses on the Baden Mainline.

On 1 August 1945, the operation of a limited third class suburban passenger service commenced, using freight trains. Of these, one ran from Norsingen (on the Rhine Valley Railway to the south) to the Hauptbahnhof and another two ran from Denzlingen (in the north) and Hugstetten (on the Breisach Railway) and terminated in the marshalling yard. The line from Himmelreich (Höllentalbahn) ran to Wiehre station. It was not until 19 December 1950 that repairs were completed to the damaged tracks on the Höllentalbahn and the Loretto tunnel, which had been blown up by the retreating Wehrmacht, restoring two tracks between Wiehre and Freiburg Hauptbahnhof. As early as October, the Baden Mainline had been restored to two-track operations, as the result of Swiss diplomacy.

The state railway of the French occupation zone in 1945 decided to continue the operation of the 20 kV 50 Hz experiment on the Höllentalbahn, which had operated on the line between 1936 and 1944. Electrification on the Baden Mainline at 15 kV 16 2/3 Hz, started in 1952, was completed to Freiburg by the end of May 1955. As the locomotives could not operate at 50 Hz, steam locomotives hauled freight trains from the Freiburg freight yard via the Hauptbahnhof to the Höllentalbahn. This system ran for five years before the experiment on the Höllentalbahn was abandoned. The two-system operation also made the establishment of ab eighth platform track necessary. With the electrification of the main line from Basel, a class E 10 electric locomotives hauled the first service to Freiburg on 4 June 1955, a day later it was hauled by a class 38 steam locomotive to Stuttgart.

Cleanup work on the station building did not begin until the autumn of 1947 and it was slow due to personnel shortages and poor materials until the currency reform of 1948. Freiburg station was rebuilt with a temporary entrance building, which was one of the first station buildings built in a German city after the war. The opening took place on 9 November 1949 in the presence of the Baden State President Leo Wohleb. A substantial renovation of the interior of the building was carried out between 1985 and 1986 on the occasion of the Freiburg State Garden Show, after the building had been extended in 1955/56.

At this time there was debate, that was to last for several decades, as to whether a renovation or construction of a new station building was required and there was much criticism in the press of the existing building. According to Badischer Zeitung newspaper the building was a disgrace to the commercial and touristic city of Freiburg and was appropriate for "a provincial 'nest' rather than a city with 160,000 people".

In the following years designs were produced, which provided for a multi-level pedestrian platform over the tracks connecting to the city centre. In addition to the mainline station, underground tram and bus stations were planned. Also, the Technisches Rathaus ("technical town hall"), which was later realised in Fehrenbachallee would be built above the tracks, along with 7- to 15-storey high-rise buildings with cinemas, department stores, cultural and convention centres and parking garages. A plan put forward in 1965 by the chief architect of the Freiburg city council, Hans Geiges called for the sale and leasing of all the land and air space. Deutsche Bundesbahn agreed in 1969 to the project as it would get more space for tracks for the upgrade of the Rhine Valley line. However, the DM 40 million Bahnhofsplatte (station plate) project failed in October 1970 because the city could not find investors. During the debate over the construction of a new culture and congress centre, the architect Manfred Saß designed a new railway station with an integrated convention centre. This provided for a 115-metre-long (377 ft 4 in) structural plate located 4.5 m (15 ft) above the tracks and would have accommodated the construction of a hall that was up to 12 metres (39 ft 4 in) high. The cost in 1978 was estimated at DM 86 million. In the same year, the resignation of the Minister President of Baden-Württemberg, Hans Filbinger, who had long lived in Freiburg, reduced the prospects of national funding for the project. Since Deutsche Bundesbahn did not want to finance any major projects as a result of increasing competition from air transport, it asked for the suspension of negotiations in 1980.

The operation at the station went on and Deutsche Bundesbahn had resumed operations of both high-speed railcars and the Rheingold. The fastest train, stopping at the station in 1960 was a Trans-Europe Express, the Helvetia, which reached a top speed of 140 km/h (87 mph).

Ticket sales between 1978 and 1988

The number of tickets sold at the railway station stood at 1.35559 million (plus 29,491 in Zähringen and 11,745 in Herder), roughly the same level as at the turn of the century and in 1935. Sales were declining as they were throughout the area of the DB Railway division in Karlsruhe. In the summer of 1960 on working days, Sundays and holidays, 163 passenger trains ran on the Rhine Valley Railway (49 intercity-express and long-distance express routes, 25 semi-fast trains), 36 on the Breisach Railway (10 multiple units) and 48 on the Höllentalbahn (12 semi-fast trains).

On 26 September 1971, the winter section of the 1971/1972 timetable came into force and Freiburg became part of the Intercity age: the station was on line 4 from Basel to Hamburg-Altona from the beginning to the former IC network of the Deutsche Bundesbahn.

With the inauguration of the Stadtbahn bridge south of the station building the tram network was also expanded in 1983. The neighbouring Wiwilí Bridge was no longer adequate for the traffic. Previously, trams also ran on Bismarckallee in front of the main entrance. All tracks are accessible from the new bridge. On each platform there are lifts and platforms 1 and 2/3, which are used by Intercity-Express services, are also equipped with escalators. They were upgraded by 27 September 1992, when the first Intercity-Express was scheduled to stop at the station on its way to Switzerland.

=== Construction of a new station building ===
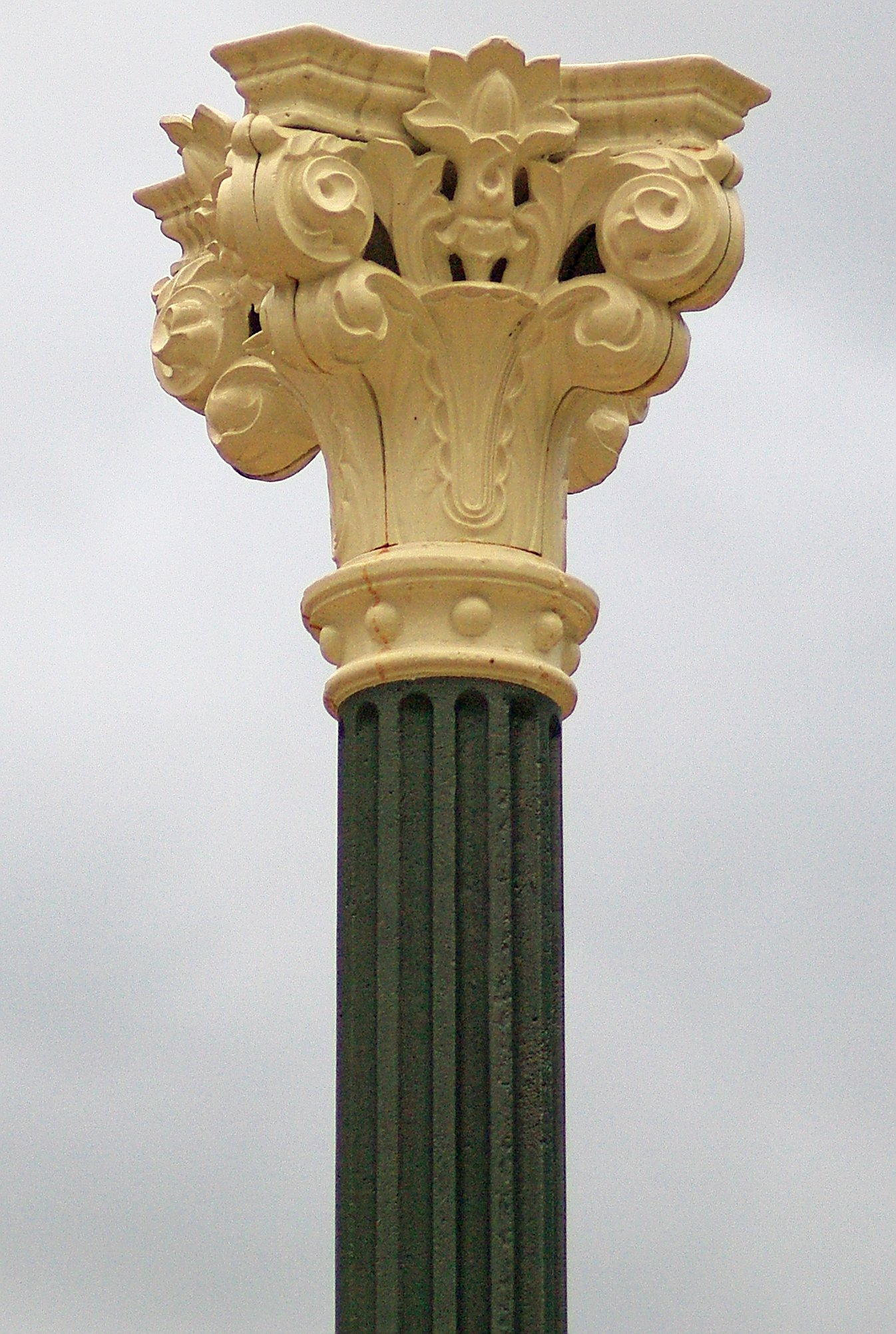
One of the Corinthian columns in the beer garden in Stühlinger (2010)

After the failed plans for the Bahnhofsplatte project and for the congress centre, the decision to build the Freiburg Concert Hall in 1988 restarted progress in the station area. Steigenberger Hotels, then a subsidiary of Deutsche Bundesbahn, decided to build a new InterCity Hotel at the station. This expanded in 1990 into planning for the full redevelopment of the entire area. Deutsche Bundesbahn, which was organised as a government agency, found itself unable to fund the necessary investment and therefore invited proposals from investors to be judged by the architect and town planner Albert Speer, Jr. There were nine proposals from seven investors. The winner was the Waldkirch architectural firm of Harter und Kanzler, with the Bilfinger Berger construction company as an investor. After consideration of various aspects of the plans by the public and the authorities, the plans were modified and the development plan for the new station were approved by Freiburg City Council on 22 June 1992.

Demolition carried out in February 1997 created space for the new building. The new station was opened on 29 September 1999 and the whole development zone around the station followed on 18 July 2001. During the renovation Corinthian columns were discovered, which since the renovation of 1885/86 had supported two platform canopies on track 1. Since retaining the columns would have required a complicated re-adjustment of the height of the roof, Deutsche Bundesbahn gave the columns away. Some of them went to the museum railway on the Wutach Valley Railway, where Weizen station has been completely rebuilt with one of the old platform canopies. The remaining columns were stored away by the city at the depot of the civil engineering office until the summer of 2010 when they were installed as a decoration in a beer garden near the station.

Today the station is served by about 250 trains a day, with 60,000 passengers embarking or disembarking daily. In addition another 50 to 150 trains pass the station each day without stopping. The station has largely reached capacity, especially as the number of passengers has doubled since 1979.

== Architecture ==
=== First building (1845–1945) ===
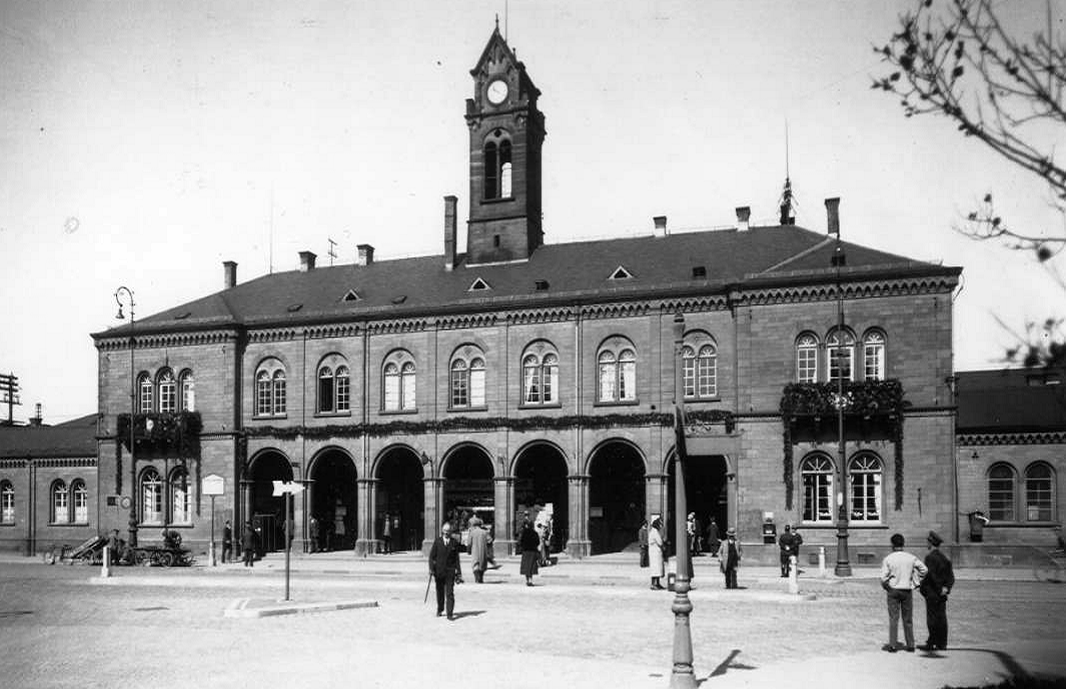
The entrance building (1890)

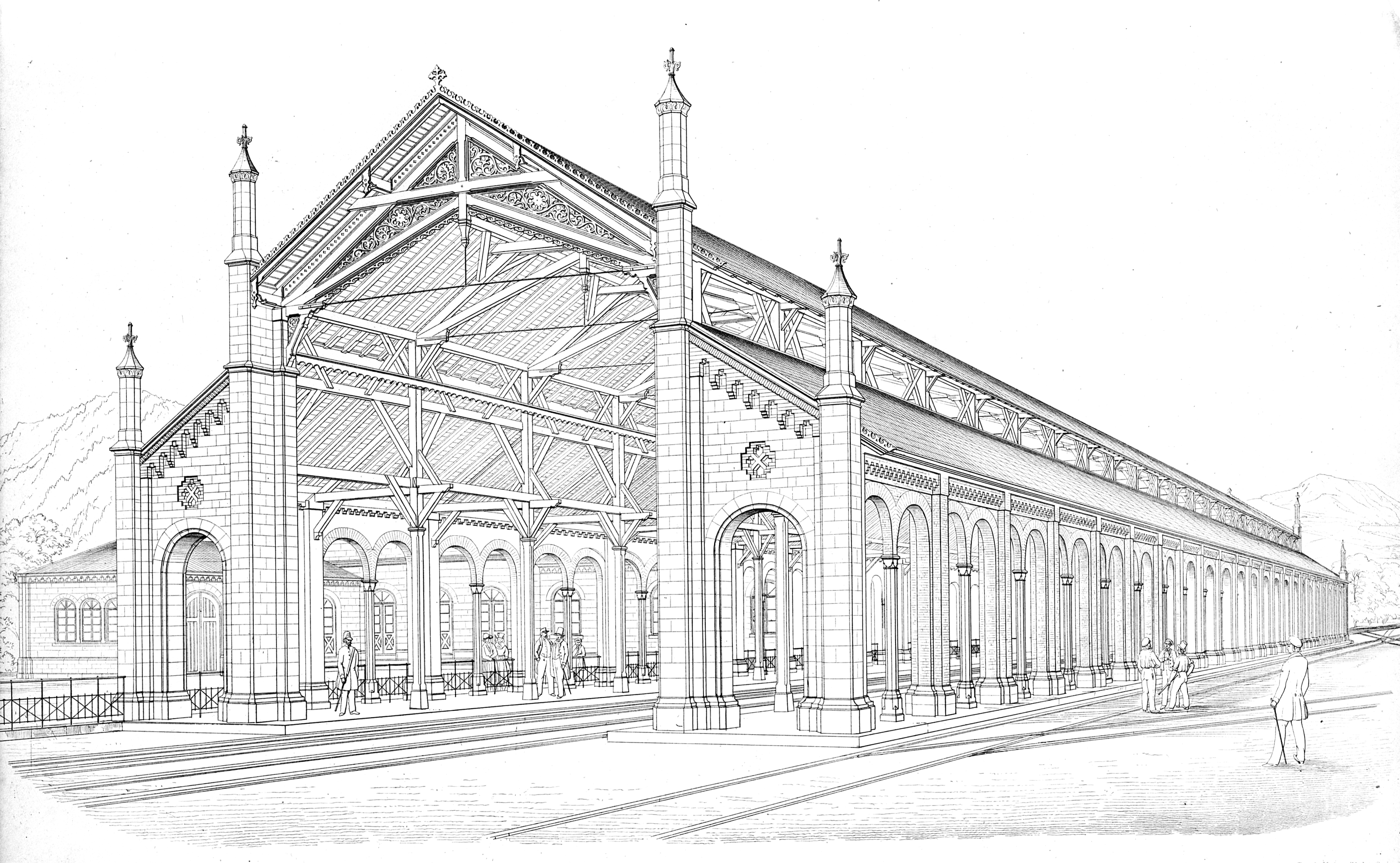
Drawing of the station concourse by Friedrich Eisenlohr (around 1845)

The two-storey station building was built to the design of the architect Friedrich Eisenlohr in the historicist style of the time with many Romanesque Revival components. As with the other important stations in Baden, the building in Freiburg was implemented in the Rundbogenstil (round arch style), which explains the preference for round-arched openings in walls and arcades.

The reception building was 70 metres (229 ft 8 in) long, 40 metres (131 ft 3 in) of this was built as two storeys. Its vestibule was reached through one of seven arches, which extended between two wings and were formed with lesenes. Above the roof turret there was a clock tower, which was crowned in the early drawings by a "graceful spire." After the spire was removed, which is already visible in photographs of 1910, the preservationist Manfred Berger considered the clock detracted from the otherwise well-balanced construction. On the ground floor there were offices for railway staff and rooms for a telegraph office and a post office. On the second floor there was housing for railway employees.

Between the platform area and the entrance building there was an open courtyard with a fountain, modelled after a Greek or Roman atrium. Along the sides there were facilities necessary for travel, including three waiting rooms for the first to third classes. The connecting building was, in contrast to many other former station buildings, arranged perpendicular to the tracks. This allowed Eisenlohr to leave the platform area and the entrance building as separate architectural units, despite the connection. However, passengers had to take into account a long walk.

The train shed was 110 metres (360 ft 11 in) long and 16.3 metres (53 ft 6 in) wide with ridgeline of the roof at a height of 12.3 metres (40 ft 4 in), the biggest in Baden. It consisted of three naves in the style of a basilica with roofs that could be drained externally. This was an improvement over Mannheim station, where there had only been two naves and there had been problems with drainage. The slate roof lay on a structure made of native wood, as Eisenlohr had avoided expensive cast iron for reasons of cost. Nevertheless, this station was, like many other stations in Baden, criticised at first for its opulence.

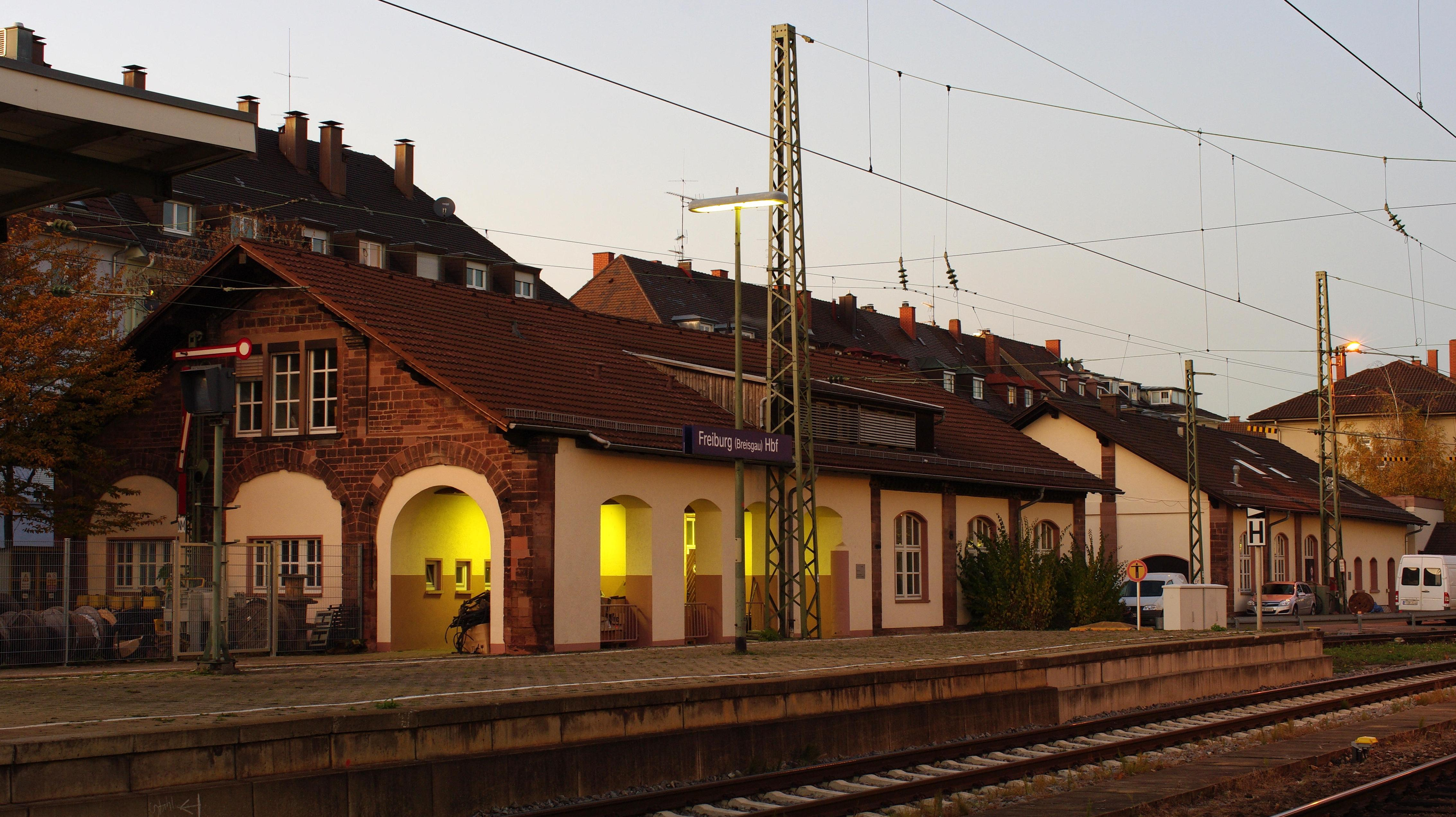
Former carriage sheds of 1845 near track 8

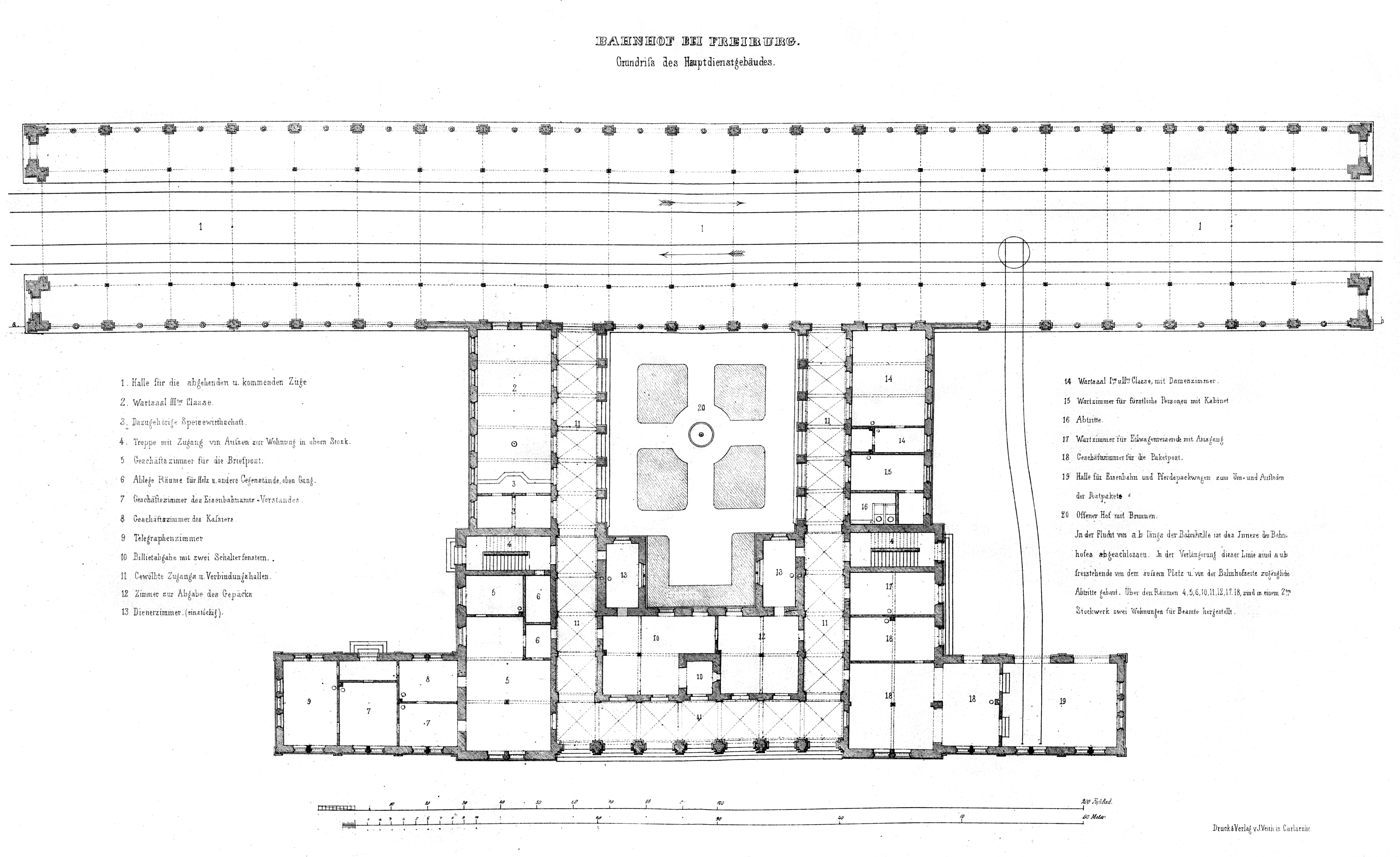
Floor plan of the station by Eisenlohr

As the freight yard was not yet separated from the passenger station, the loading of freight was possible using a loading siding and a loading road on both sides of the station. On the west side of the station there were larger loading areas and cranes, but no large gantry crane. The freight halls were on the east side of the station. The entrance freight hall contained both of the customs warehouses. The receiving and shipping area were each 99 metres (324 ft 10 in) long but only 13.5 metres (44 ft 3 in) wide. The express freight hall had a storage area of 640 m^{2} (6,900 sq ft).

The only remaining building of the original station area, the carriage halls that were built in 1845 between Wenzingerstraße and track 8, are both under heritage protection.

=== Second building (1949–1999) ===
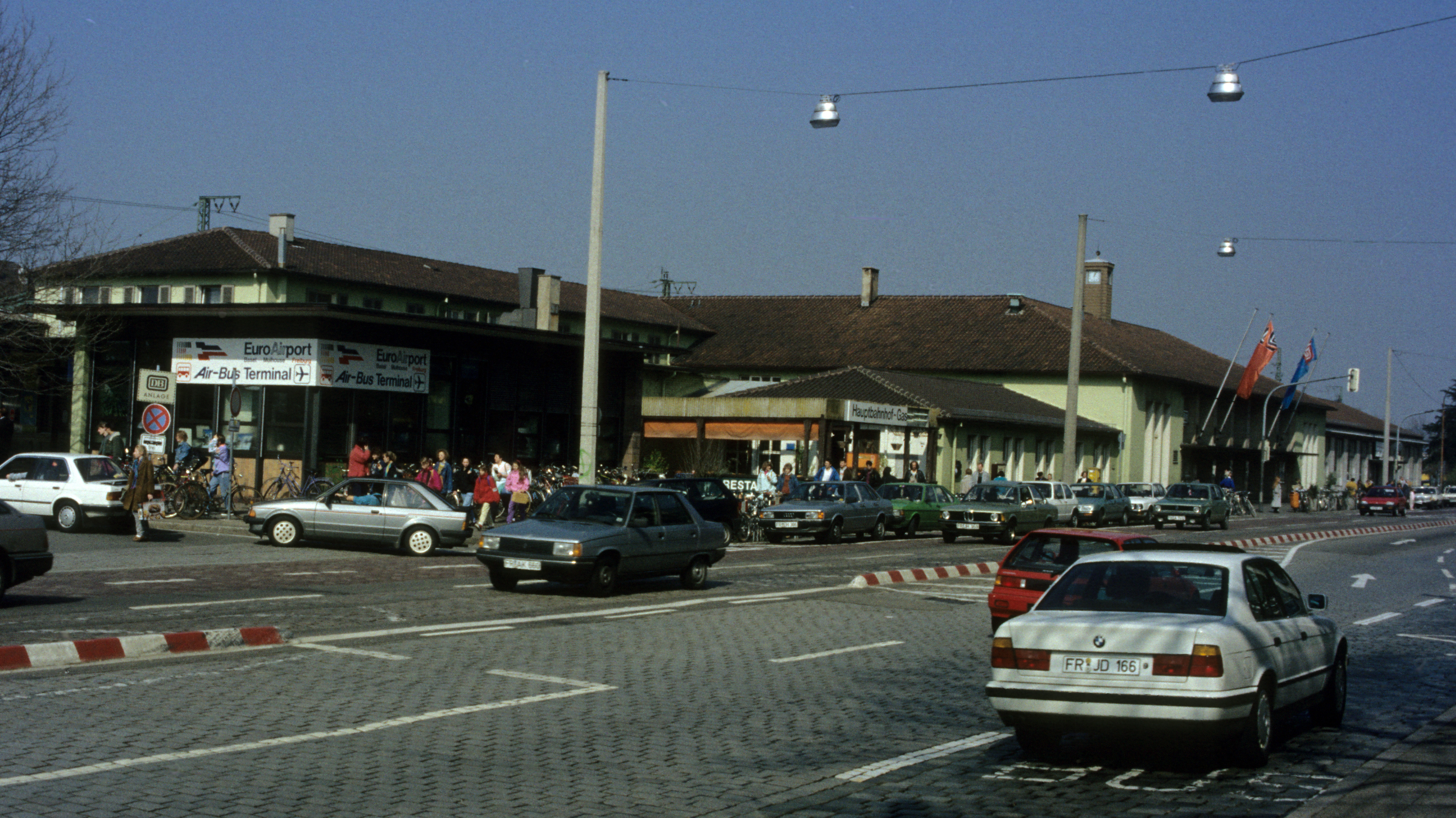
The temporary station of 1949

The lack of financial resources, building materials and construction machinery meant that an architecturally complex solution could be ruled out from the beginning. Therefore, it was decided the re-use of the intact foundations and the basement. On this basis, a floor plan was created with a massive central block and two lower wings in lightweight construction, which could be later expanded on one level or replaced by multi-storey buildings. It was designed and built by the railway administration and the architect Walter Lay.

The steel frame of the skylight of the old building had also survived the air raids. By reusing this component with dimensions of 15.6 by 12.4 metres (51 ft 2 in × 40 ft 8 in), the middle part of the building was adequately supplied with natural light, which, given the height of the hall, which was only 5.5 metres (18 ft 1 in), would otherwise not have been possible. Unlike its predecessor, the waiting rooms were no longer determined by ticket class, but instead by the distinction between smokers and non-smokers. A clock tower was placed on the roof in order to recall the memory of the old station.

The main hall, built between 1947 and 1949 for DM 300,000 by the construction company Bilfinger Berger was, according to the Badische Zeitung newspaper, recognised for its "extremely clever floor plan", especially in view the fact that there was only 30 metres (98 ft 5 in) between the platform and the station forecourt. At 520 m^{2} (5,600 sq ft) the area with the station hall was even larger than its predecessor. The British magazine, The Railway Gazette described the building in 1950 as "not only fully adequate for the purpose, but also satisfactory architecturally".

=== Third building (since 2001) ===
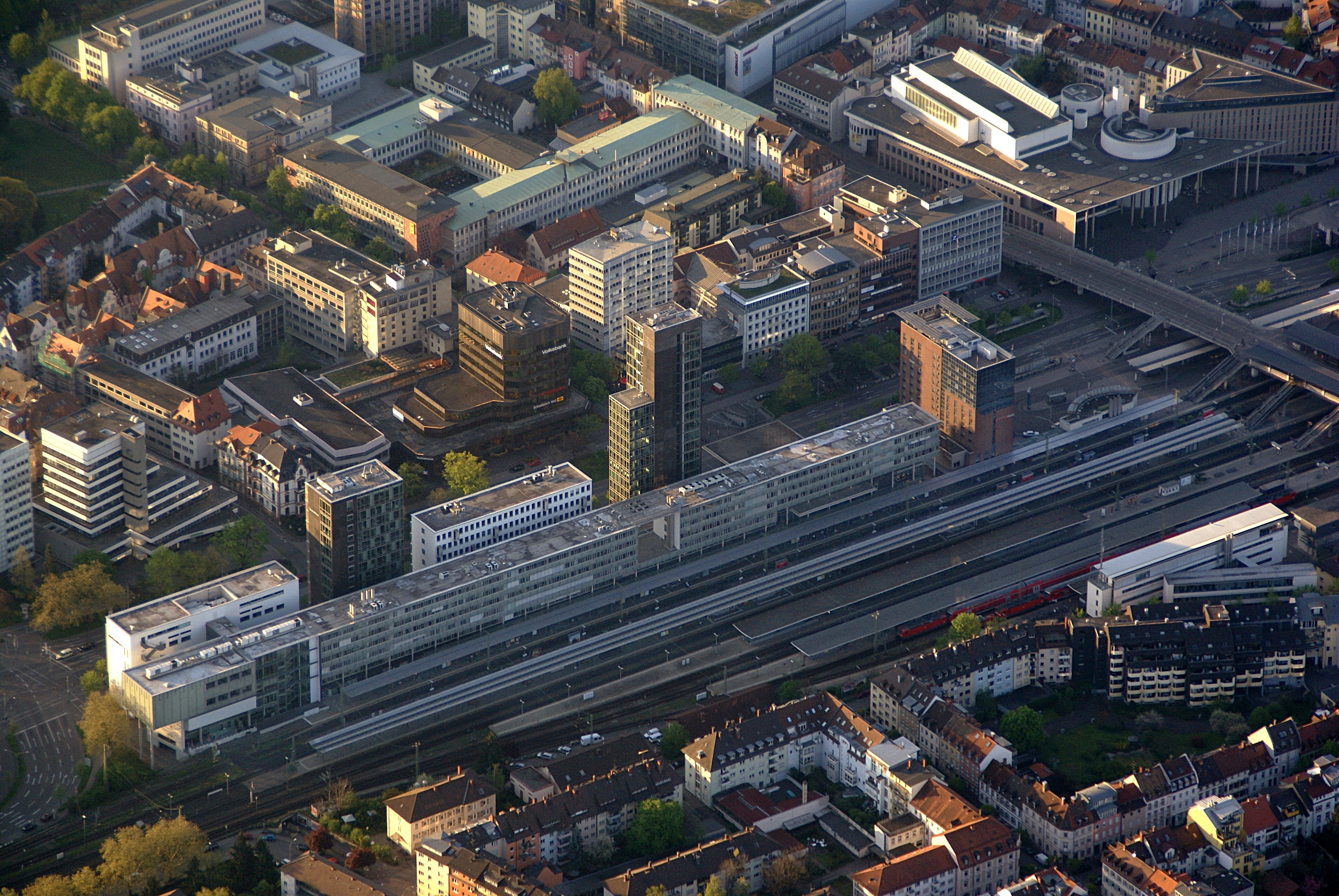
Bird's eye view

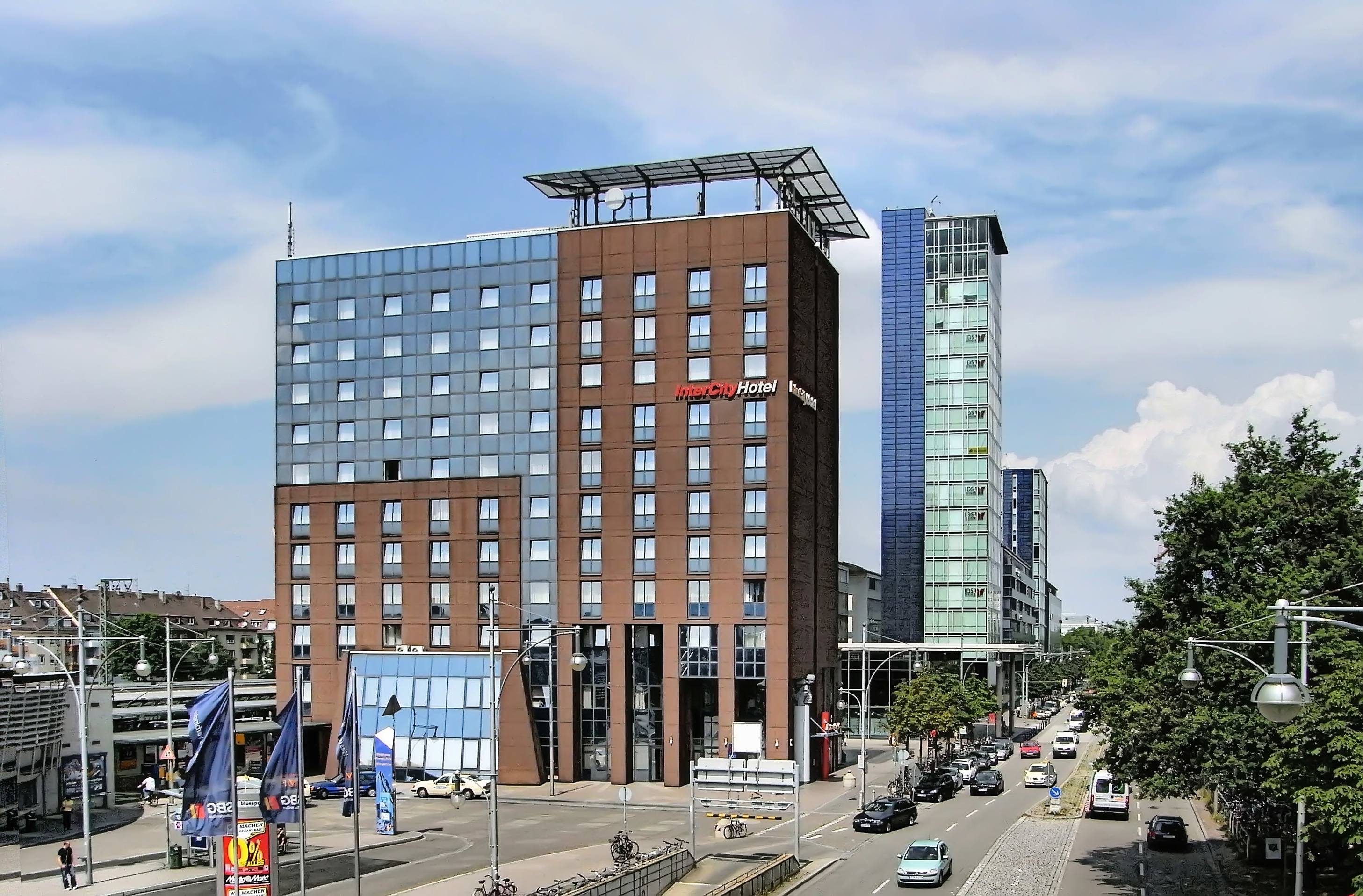
South side

The temporary station was demolished and replaced by a new building with a gross floor area of 40,000 square metres (431,000 sq ft) and a gross volume of 230,000 cubic metres (8,120,000 cu ft), significantly larger than the old complex. The building cost a total of €61.4 million.

Its core consists of two buildings with six floors (22 metres/72 ft high) and a length of 275 metres (900 ft) on the tracks and 265 metres (870 ft) on Bismarckallee and two office towers with a height of 44 metres (144 ft) and 66 metres (217 ft). They are located opposite Eisenbahnstraße and Rosastraße. The higher of the two towers is the second tallest building in the city after Freiburg Minster.

The two buildings are connected by a glass roof built above the level of their second floors; under it there are the entrance hall and a market hall connected to it along with the DB travel centre. In addition, there are a variety of restaurants and shops in the market hall and the loft over it. In the remaining floors and the two office towers there is 25,000 square metres (269,000 sq ft) of office space. On the two upper floors of the higher tower is the Kagan, a combination of café, bar and nightclub.

There is access via escalators and a glass elevator from the entrance hall to the basement, where there are also businesses. From there it is possible to reach all eight platforms, the station's underground garage and the central bus station. A staircase and an elevator lead to the opposite side of Bismarckallee, where Eisenbahnstraße lead to the city centre. On the other side of the railway underpass, there is a ramp and a staircase to Wentzingerstraße, giving access to the Stühlinger district.

The underpass is illuminated by a skylight that is integrated into the station forecourt between the station building and the InterCity Hotel. Benches are placed around the skylight, which is about a metre high. The floating roof of the entrance building reflects, according to the architects, the roof of the concert hall and the two towers relate on the other hand, according to their owners, to the cathedral and the towns two gates (Martinstor and Schwabentor).

The facade of the building is largely transparent as it is made of glass, but the west side is rather dark as a result of the use of prefabricated parts. The two towers on the south side have a photovoltaic system built to the plans of Solarstrom AG, which earned the architectural firm of Harter und Kanzler an award for photovoltaic architecture in 2001 from the State of Baden-Württemberg.

== Tracks ==
The main tracks of the Freiburg station consists of the two tracks of the Rhine Valley Railway and the two tracks of the Höllentalbahn and the single track of the line to Breisach. Between the tracks of the Rhine Valley Railway and the Höllentalbahn to the south of the platforms there is a depot with sidings that supply rolling stock for the Höllentalbahn and the Rhine Valley Railway between Basel and Karlsruhe and, since 2004, the Black Forest Railway. Currently it houses locomotives of classes 110, 111, 143, 146.1 and 146.2 and several red n-coaches and double deck coaches.

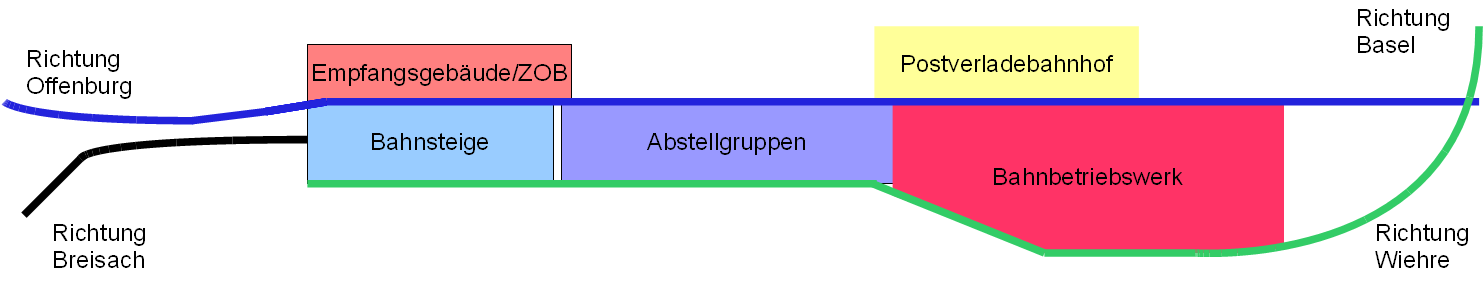
Schematic diagram of tracks in the station area

== Operations ==
=== Long-distance passenger services ===
In long-distance traffic there are regular Intercity-Express connections from Freiburg station to the north in the direction of Berlin, Hamburg and Cologne from platform track 1. Services to Cologne consist of coupled sets, which are separated in Cologne, continuing to Dortmund and Hamburg. In addition, there are daily IC services to both Frankfurt and Nuremberg. Most trains to the south run to Basel, with some continuing to Zürich or Interlaken Ost. The long-distance trains to the south mostly stop on track 3.

EuroCity services on the Chur–Hamburg/Hamburg–Chur route also stop in Freiburg. The station was served by the following long-distance services in 2026:

| Train class | Route | | | Frequency |
|---|---|---|---|---|
| ICE 12 | Berlin Ostbahnhof – Berlin – Braunschweig – Göttingen – Kassel – Frankfurt – Mannheim – Karlsruhe – Freiburg – Basel – | Liestal – Olten – Bern – Thun – Spiez – | Interlaken West – Interlaken East | Every two hours |
| ICE 12 | Berlin Ostbahnhof – Berlin – Braunschweig – Göttingen – Kassel – Frankfurt – Mannheim – Karlsruhe – Freiburg – Basel – | Liestal – Olten – Bern – Thun – Spiez – | Visp – Brig | Every two hours |
| ICE 12 | Berlin Ostbahnhof – Berlin – Braunschweig – Göttingen – Kassel – Frankfurt – Mannheim – Karlsruhe – Freiburg – Basel – | Zürich – Sargans – Landquart – Chur | | Every two hours |
| ICE/ECE 20 | Hamburg – Hannover – Kassel – Frankfurt – Mannheim – Karlsruhe – Freiburg – Basel Bad Bf – Basel SBB | | | Every two hours |
| ICE 43 | Hamburg-Altona – Hamburg – Bremen – Osnabrück – Münster – Dortmund – Essen – Düsseldorf – | | Cologne – Frankfurt Airport – Mannheim – Karlsruhe – Freiburg – Basel Bad Bf – Basel SBB | Every two hours |
| ICE 43 | Hannover – Bielefeld – Hamm – Dortmund – Wuppertal – | | Cologne – Frankfurt Airport – Mannheim – Karlsruhe – Freiburg – Basel Bad Bf – Basel SBB | Every two hours |
| ICE 43 | Amsterdam – Oberhausen – Duisburg – Düsseldorf – | | Cologne – Frankfurt Airport – Mannheim – Karlsruhe – Freiburg – Basel Bad Bf – Basel SBB | Every two hours |
| ICE 60; Baden-Kurier | Basel SBB – Basel Bad Bf – Freiburg – Offenburg – Karlsruhe – Bruchsal – Stuttgart – Ulm – Augsburg – Munich | | | one train pair |
| ECE 85 | Milano – Lugano – Zürich – Basel SBB – Basel Bad Bf – Freiburg – Ringsheim/Europa-Park – Karlsruhe –Mannheim – Frankfurt | | | one train pair |
| TGV inOui | Paris-Est – Strasbourg-Ville – Offenburg – Lahr (Schwarzw) – Ringsheim/Europa-Park – Freiburg | | | One return/day |
| TGV inOui | Bordeaux-St-Jean – Massy TGV – Aeroport Paris-Charles de Gaulle TGV – Strasbourg – Offenburg – Freiburg | | | One pair Sat |
| Nightjet Zürich – Berlin | Zürich – Basel SBB – Basel Bad Bf – Freiburg – Offenburg – Karlsruhe – Frankfurt Süd – Leipzig (train split) – | | Dresden – Decin – Prague | single service |
| EuroNight Zürich – Prague | Zürich – Basel SBB – Basel Bad Bf – Freiburg – Offenburg – Karlsruhe – Frankfurt Süd – Leipzig (train split) – | | Halle – Bitterfeld – Berlin | single service |
| Nightjet Zürich – Hamburg-Altona | Zürich – Basel Bad Bf – Freiburg – Karlsruhe – Heidelberg – Frankfurt Süd – Hannover – Bremen – Hamburg – Hamburg-Altona | | | single service |
| Nightjet Zürich – Amsterdam | Zürich – Basel Bad Bf – Freiburg – Offenburg – Bonn-Beuel – Köln – Utrecht – Amsterdam | | | one train pair |
| FLX 10 | Basel Bad Bf – Freiburg – Offenburg – Karlsruhe – Heidelberg – Darmstadt – Frankfurt Süd – Erfurt – Halle – Berlin | | | one train pair |

=== Local services ===
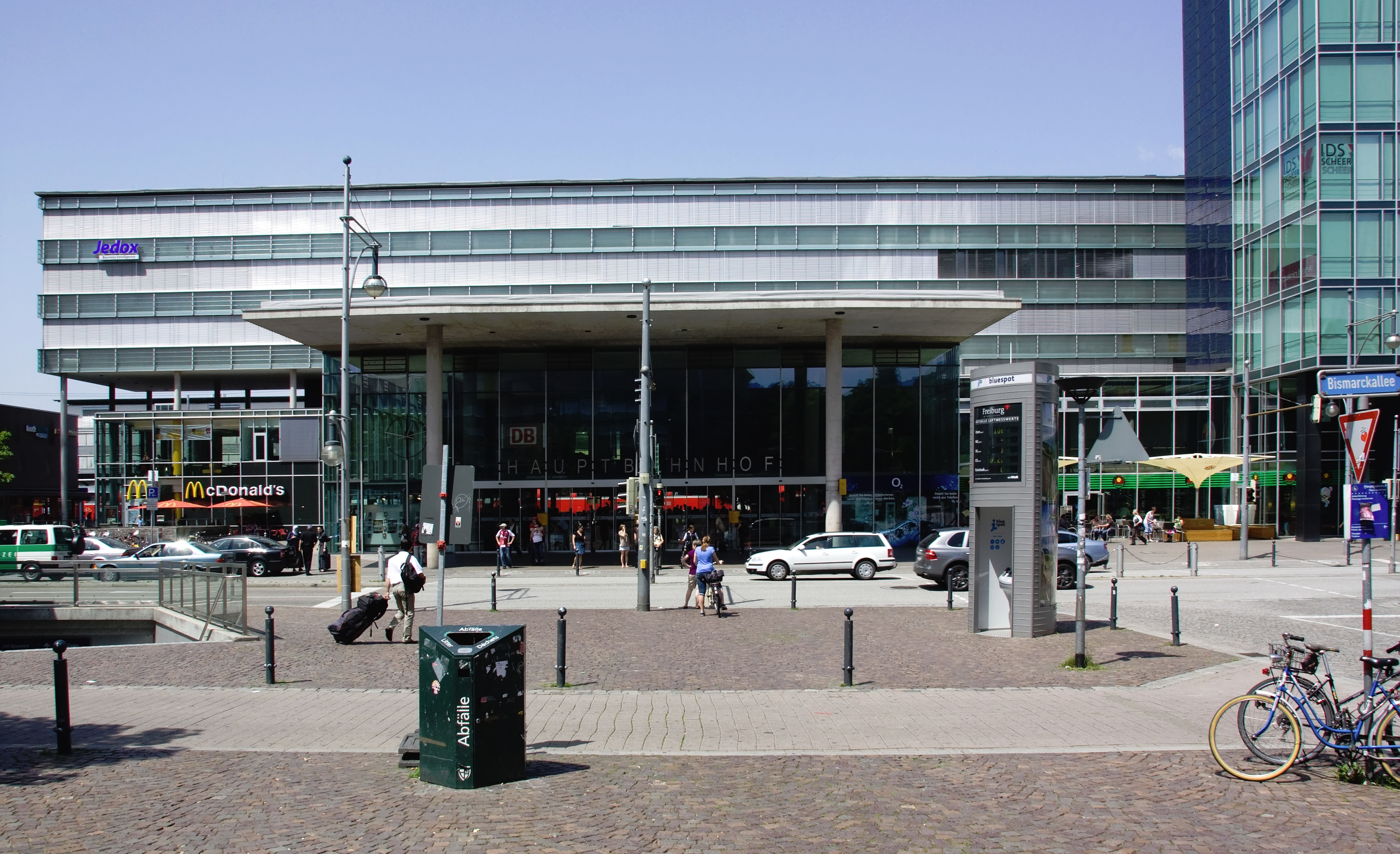
Entrance to the lobby with canopy

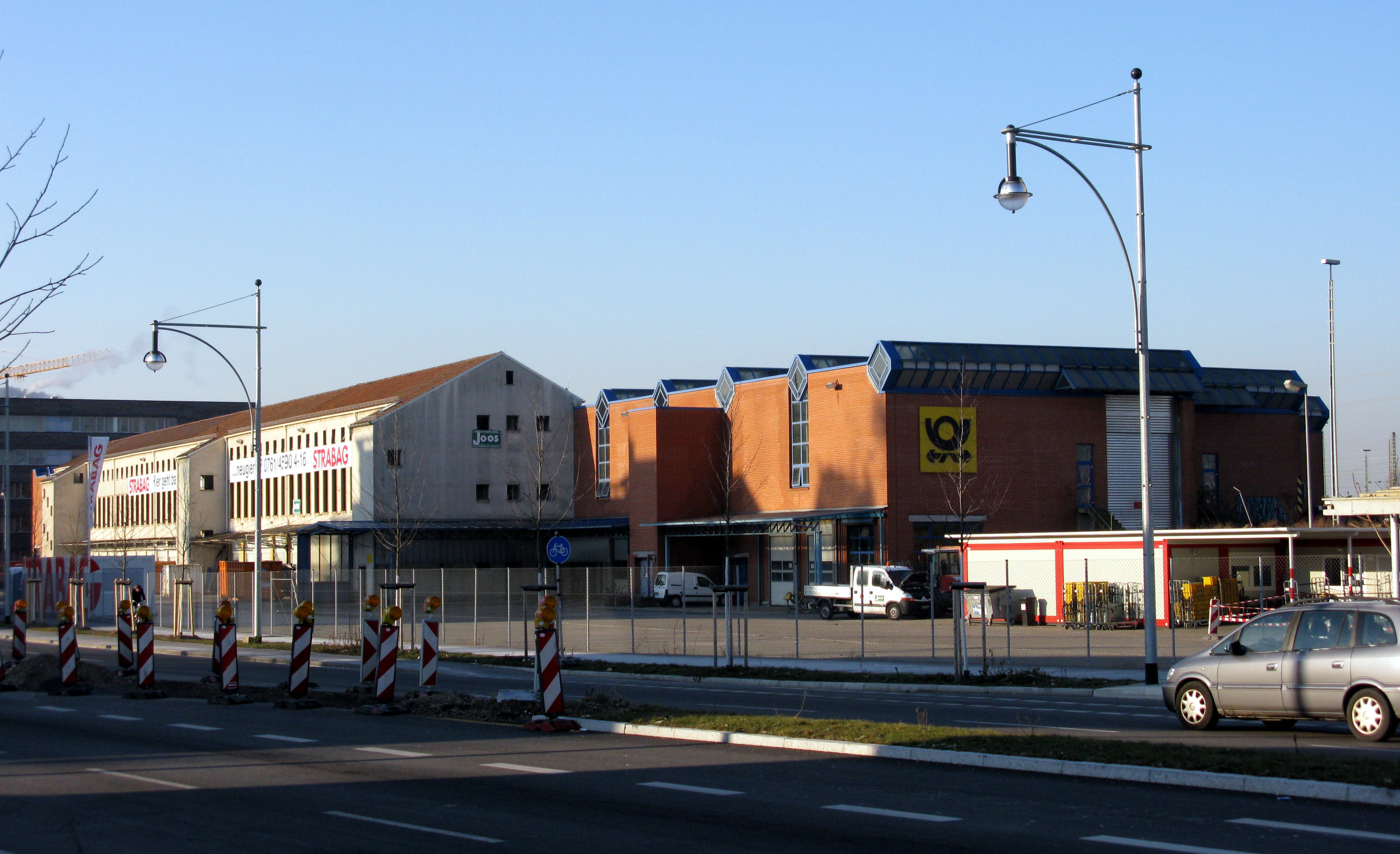
Postal station, seen from Heinrich-von-Stephan-Straße

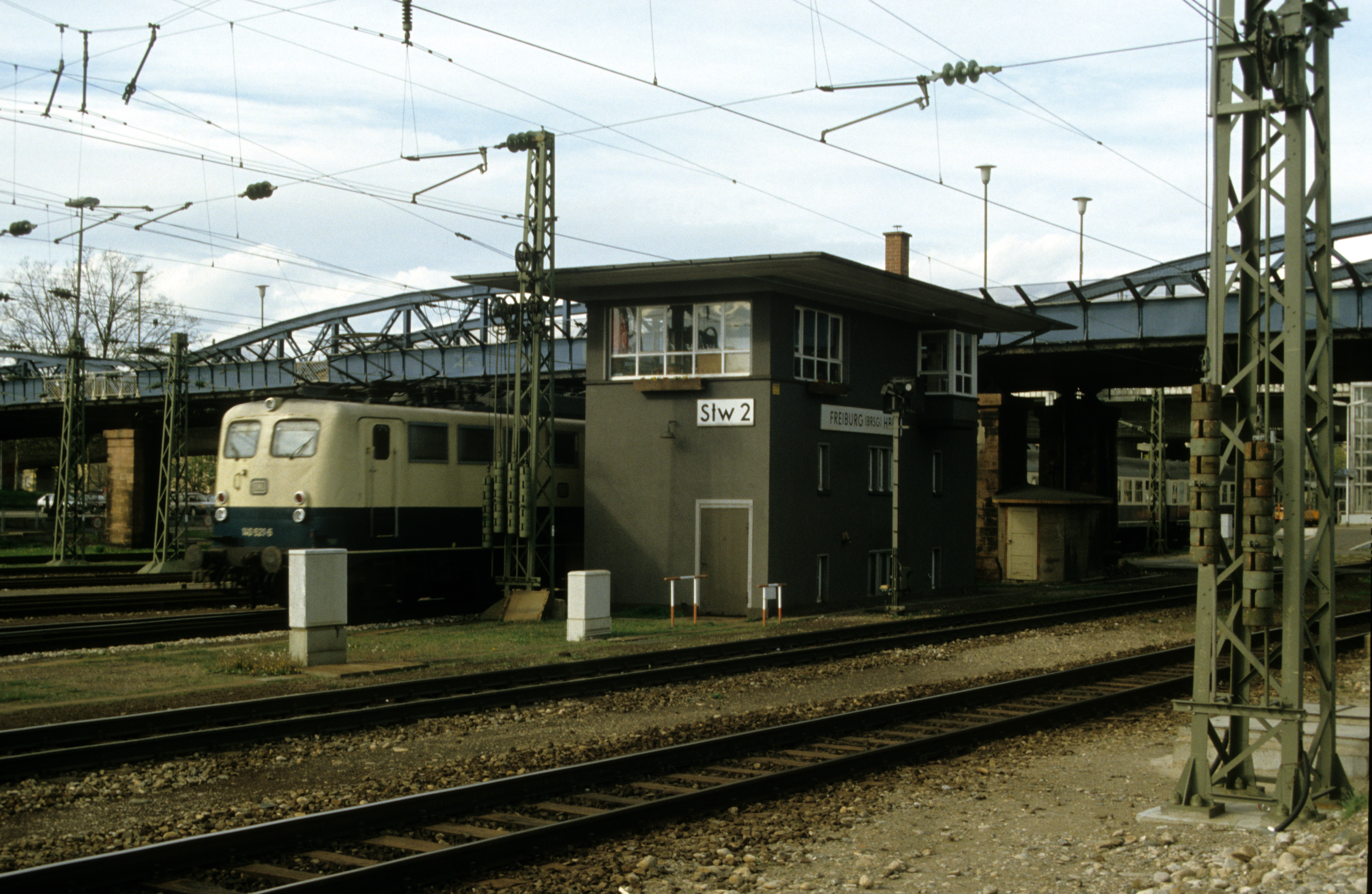
Former signal box no 2 at the Wiwilí bridge with Baureihe 140 electric locomotive departing towards Basel

Regular intervals services (leaving and arriving around the hour and the half-hour) result in many radial connections in all directions. On the Rhine Valley Railway, many of the Regional-Express services run between Offenburg and Basel without change.

Services run on the Höllentalbahn every half-hour towards Hinterzarten/Titisee in the Black Forest, with trains continuing towards Neustadt or via the Three Lakes Railway (DreiSeenBahn) to Schluchsee-Seebrugg. Neustadt is connected to Donaueschingen on the Black Forest Railway, where services connect towards Rottweil or over the Danube Valley Railway (see Tuttlingen–Inzigkofen railway and Ulm–Sigmaringen railway) to Tuttlingen and Ulm.

The Breisgau S-Bahn, the regional rail services of the Freiburg area, connects Freiburg every half-hour via the Breisach Railway with Breisach and the Kaiserstuhl Railway, which branches in Gottenheim, running through some of the towns of the Kaiserstuhl. The same company also operates the Elz Valley Railway. Trains run hourly to and from Elzach and every half-hour to Waldkirch. The South German Railway Company (Süddeutsche Eisenbahn-Gesellschaft AG, SWEG) operates the trains on the Münster Valley Railway, but only a few of its services run to Freiburg.

The station is also the northern terminus of a service of the trinational Basel S-Bahn, operated by DB Regio. The station was served by the following regional services in 2026:

| Train class | Route | Frequency | Platform |
|---|---|---|---|
| RE 7 | (Karlsruhe –) Offenburg – Lahr – (Schwarzwald) – Emmendingen – Freiburg – Bad Krozingen – Müllheim – Basel Bad (– Basel SBB) | Every 60 minutes | 1/2/3/4 |
| RB 26 | (Müllheim (Baden) –) Freiburg – Emmendingen – Lahr (Schwarzwald) – Offenburg | Every 60 minutes | 2/3/4/5 |
| RB 27/RB27 | Freiburg – Ebringen – Schallstadt – Bad Krozingen – Heitersheim – Müllheim – (Neuenburg/Basel Bad) | Every 60 minutes | 1/2/3/4 |
| S1 | Freiburg – Kirchzarten – Titisee – Seebrugg / Neustadt | Every 30 (60) minutes | 6/7 |
| S10 | Freiburg – Kirchzarten – Titisee – Neustadt – Löffingen – Donaueschingen – Villingen | Every 60 minutes | 8 |
| S11 | Endingen – Riegel – Gottenheim – Freiburg – Kirchzarten (– Titisee – Neustadt) | Every 30 (60) minutes | 6/7 |
| S2 | Freiburg – Denzlingen – Waldkirch (– Elzach) | Every 30 (60) minutes | 4/5/6/8 |
| S3 | Freiburg – Ebringen – Schallstadt – Bad Krozingen – Oberkrozingen – Staufen (– Münstertal) | Every 30 (60) minutes (1 train on Sundays from/to Freiburg) | 3 |

== Transport links ==
Freiburg station was already in the 1950s an important junction between long-distance, regional and local transport. It allowed direct transfer into post buses (buses then operated by the German Post Office) and trams; this was probably the only place this happed in Freiburg at the time. The central bus station is now located at the southern end of platform 1. It is mainly served by SüdbadenBus (SBG), which has also established and operates a service centre here. From here, there are up to 15 bus services each day operated by Freiburger Reisedienst to EuroAirport Basel-Mulhouse-Freiburg. There are also links to Europa-Park in Rust, in the Black Forest to Elzach and St. Peter and to Colmar and Mulhouse, operated by SBG, and some private bus routes operated by Regio-Verkehrsverbund (Freiburg regional transport association of Freiburg, RVF). A total of 15 bus routes serve the central bus station.

Stühlinger bridge is located over the tracks as an overpass for pedestrians and trams and it has a stop called Hauptbahnhof (Stadtbahn) on the Freiburg tramway operated by Freiburger Verkehrs AG (Freiburg Transport, AG). This stop is served by four of Freiburg's five tram lines. There is a bus stop for VAG under the bridge, near the bus station in Bismarckallee.

| Line number | Mode | Line |
|---|---|---|
| 1 | Tram | Littenweiler – Bertoldsbrunnen – Hauptbahnhof – Paduaallee – Landwasser |
| 2 | Tram | Günterstal – Bertoldsbrunnen – Hauptbahnhof – Hauptfriedhof – Hornusstraße |
| 3 | Tram | Vauban – Johanneskirche – Bertoldsbrunnen – Hauptbahnhof – Haid |
| 4 | Tram | Messe – Uniklinik – Hauptbahnhof – Bertoldsbrunnen – Hornusstraße – Zähringen |
| 11 | City bus | Hauptbahnhof – Pressehaus – Vauban – St. Georgen – Haid – Paduaalee |
| 14 | City bus | Hauptbahnhof – Eschholzstraße – Haslach – Haid |
| 23 | City bus | Hauptbahnhof – Rennweg – Industriegebiet Nord – Gundelfinger Straße |
| 27 | City bus | Hauptbahnhof – Siegesdenkmal – Herdern |

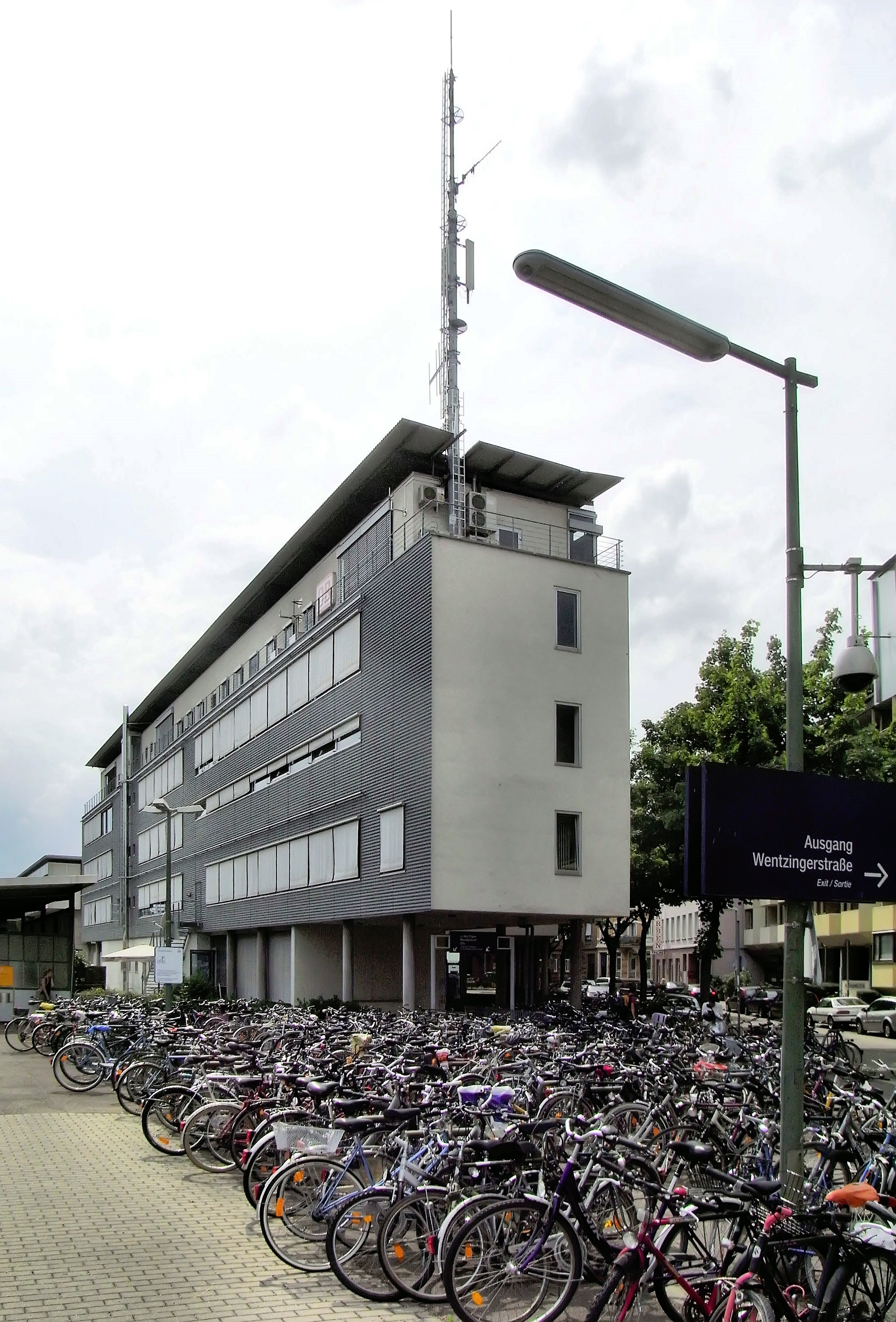
Operations building and bicycle parking on Wentzingerstraße

== See also ==
- Rail transport in Germany
