= Denzlingen station =

Railway station in Denzlingen, Germany

Denzlingen
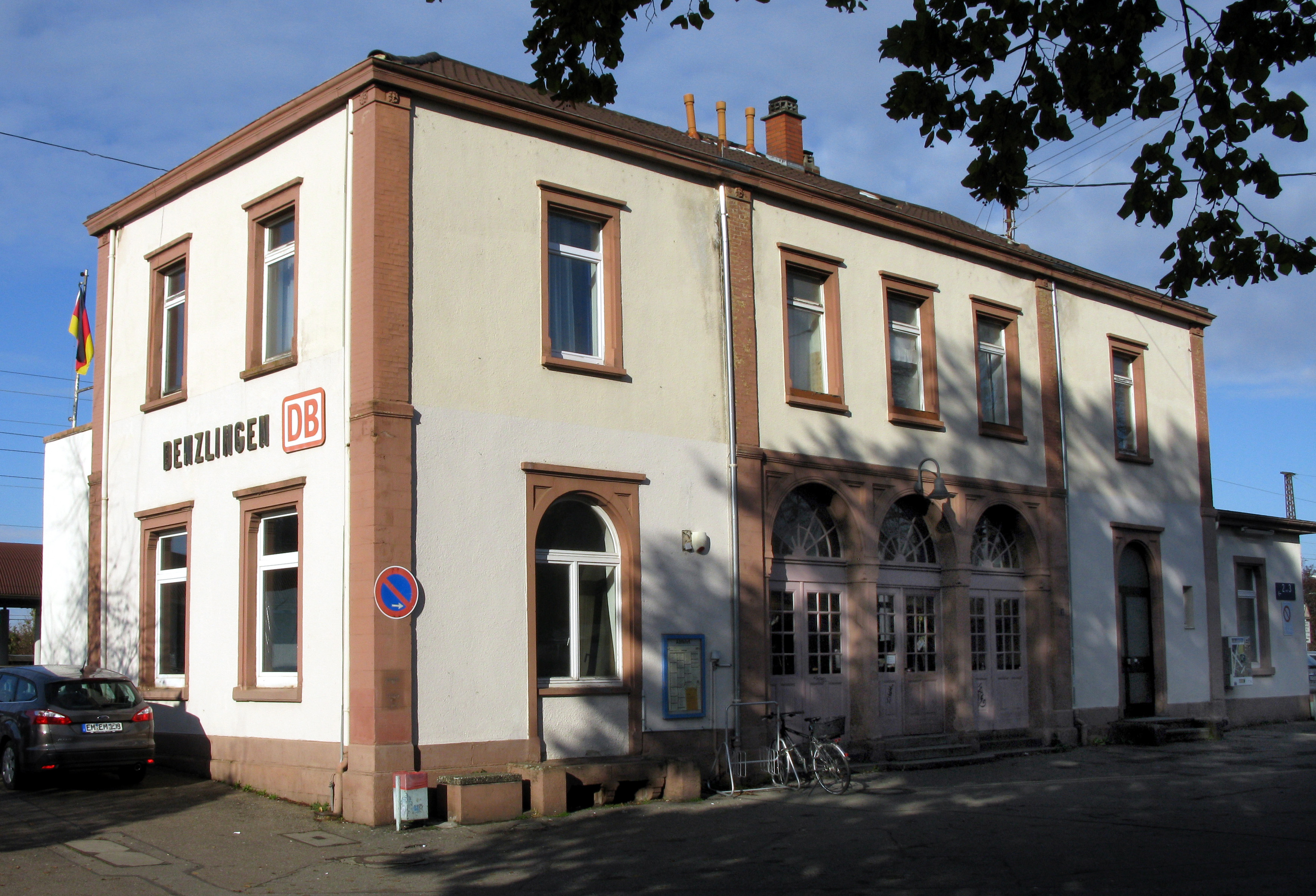
- Station building from the street side

General information
- Location: Bahnhofstr. 1, Denzlingen, Baden-Württemberg; Germany
- Coordinates: 48°04′10″N 7°52′55″E
- Owner: Deutsche Bahn
- Operator: DB Netz; DB Station&Service
- Lines: Rhine Valley Railway (km 199.8) (KBS 703); Elz Valley Railway (km 0.0) (KBS 726)
- Tracks: 4

Construction
- Accessible: Yes

Other information
- Station code: 1165
- DS100 code: RDZ
- IBNR: 8001415
- Category: 4
- Fare zone: RVF: B
- Website: www.bahnhof.de

History
- Opened: 30 July 1845

Services
Preceding station	DB Regio Baden-Württemberg	Following station
Emmendingen towards Karlsruhe Hbf	RE 7	Freiburg Hbf towards Basel Bad Bf
Kollmarseute towards Offenburg	RB 26	Gundelfingen (Breisgau) towards Freiburg Hbf
Emmendingen Terminus	RB 27	Freiburg Hbf towards Basel Bad Bf or Neuenburg (Baden)
Preceding station	Breisgau S-Bahn	Following station
Buchholz (Baden) towards Elzach	S2	Gundelfingen (Breisgau) towards Freiburg Hbf
Location

Denzlingen station is a station in Denzlingen in Baden-Württemberg, Germany. It lies on the Rhine Valley Railway at the junction with the Elz Valley Railway (Elztalbahn), which runs to Elzach. It is served by trains operated by Deutsche Bahn (DB) and the Breisgau S-Bahn (BSB) and has a total of four platform tracks. DB designates it as a class 4 station.

== History ==
Denzlingen station was opened with the commissioning of the Offenburg–Freiburg section of the Rhine Valley Railway (Rheintalbahn) from Mannheim to Basel via Karlsruhe and Freiburg on 30 July 1845.

The Elz Valley Railway (Elztalbahn) was opened to Waldkirch in 1875 on the initiative of the town of Waldkirch. Operation of the line, which was opened on 1 January 1875, was transferred to the Grand Duchy of Baden State Railways (Großherzoglich Badische Staatseisenbahnen) in 1887. The Elz Valley Railway was extended by twelve kilometres to its current terminus in Elzach in 1901.

The entire length of the Rhine Valley Railway, including Denzlingen station, was electrified in 1955.

In 1997 the Elz Valley Railway was selected by the Zweckverband Regionalverkehr Breisgau (Breisgau regional transport association, ZRF) together with the Freiburg–Breisach railway, as a pilot route for the Breisgau-S-Bahn 2005 integrated regional transport concept. In the following years the passenger service was expanded and the railway facilities were completely refurbished and renewed.

The underpass to the island platform was built in the early 1980s, at the same time as the Vörstetter Strasse underpass. Previously, the island platform was accessible to passengers via a pedestrian crossing over the tracks. A sliding barrier between the tracks was opened before the arrival of a train on platform 2, and again after the train left, with a clear announcement by the station staff on duty—similar to the procedure now used in Waldkirch, but carried out manually. The position of the crossing can still be seen today (2018) from the corrugated edge on platform 2 opposite the station building.

== Entrance building ==
The rather stately entrance building of Denzlingen station now houses a branch of a bakery chain on the ground floor. The upper floor is privately owned.

== Track layout ==
Denzlingen station has three main through tracks, all of which have a platform. Platform track (number 5) branches off to the north from track 1. This is the starting point of the Elz Valley Railway. Next to it are two sidings without a platform.

- Platform track 1 is the through track next to the entrance building. All Deutsche Bahn regional trains towards Offenburg now stop on it.
- Platform track 2 is a through track and shares an island platform with track 3. DB trains to Basel and the BSB trains to Freiburg stop on it.
- Platform track 3, which shares the island platform with platform track 2, now serves only as a siding for southbound trains.
- BSB trains running towards Waldkirch and Elzach stop on platform 5, which branches off to the north of platform 1.
- Tracks 6 and 7, which were dead-end sidings for freight transport, are still visible today and are used by Deutsche Bahn as sidings for work trains. The municipality of Denzlingen plans to dismantle these tracks and use the space for a commuter car park.

Access to the island platform is through an underpass with stairs and ramps. The station has no lifts, but the ramps provide barrier-free entry to the trains.

== Rail services ==
Denzlingen is served by 120 trains daily. There are direct connections to Basel, Freiburg im Breisgau, Offenburg and Karlsruhe. The municipality forms part of the Regio-Verkehrsverbund Freiburg (Freiburg regional transport association; RVF).

=== Long-distance traffic ===
No long-distance trains are scheduled to stop in Denzlingen. The closest station that is scheduled to be used for long-distance transport is Freiburg (Breisgau) Hauptbahnhof. However, Denzlingen station occasionally serves as a substitute stop during construction work around Freiburg Hauptbahnhof if long-distance trains have to use the freight bypass.

=== Local services ===
Denzlingen is served by Regional-Express trains between Offenburg and Basel. In addition, it is served by some Regionalbahn services running between Basel or Neuenburg and Offenburg, mostly in the peak, some running to/from Karlsruhe.

The Breisgau S-Bahn runs every 30 to 60 minutes on the Elz Valley Railway to Waldkirch and Elzach. Most of the Elz Valley Railway trains start in Freiburg.

Train class	Route	Frequency
RE	Offenburg – Lahr (Schwarzw) – Emmendingen – Denzlingen – Freiburg (Breisgau) – Schallstadt – Bad Krozingen – Müllheim (Baden) – Basel Bad Bf (– Basel SBB)	60 min
RB	(Karlsruhe –) Offenburg – Lahr (Schwarzw) – Emmendingen – Denzlingen – Freiburg (Breisgau) – Ebringen – Schallstadt – Bad Krozingen – Heitersheim – Müllheim (Baden) – Neuenburg (Baden) / Basel Bad Bf	Hourly (with gaps)
BSB	Elzach – Waldkirch – Denzlingen – Freiburg (Breisgau)	30 min (to Waldkirch); 60 min (to Elzach)
