= RDZ =

RDZ may refer to:

- Denzlingen station, Baden-Württemberg, Germany (by DS100 code)
- Rodez–Aveyron Airport, France (by IATA code)
- Roberto De Zerbi, Italian football manager
