= Elz Valley Railway =

Standard gauge branch line

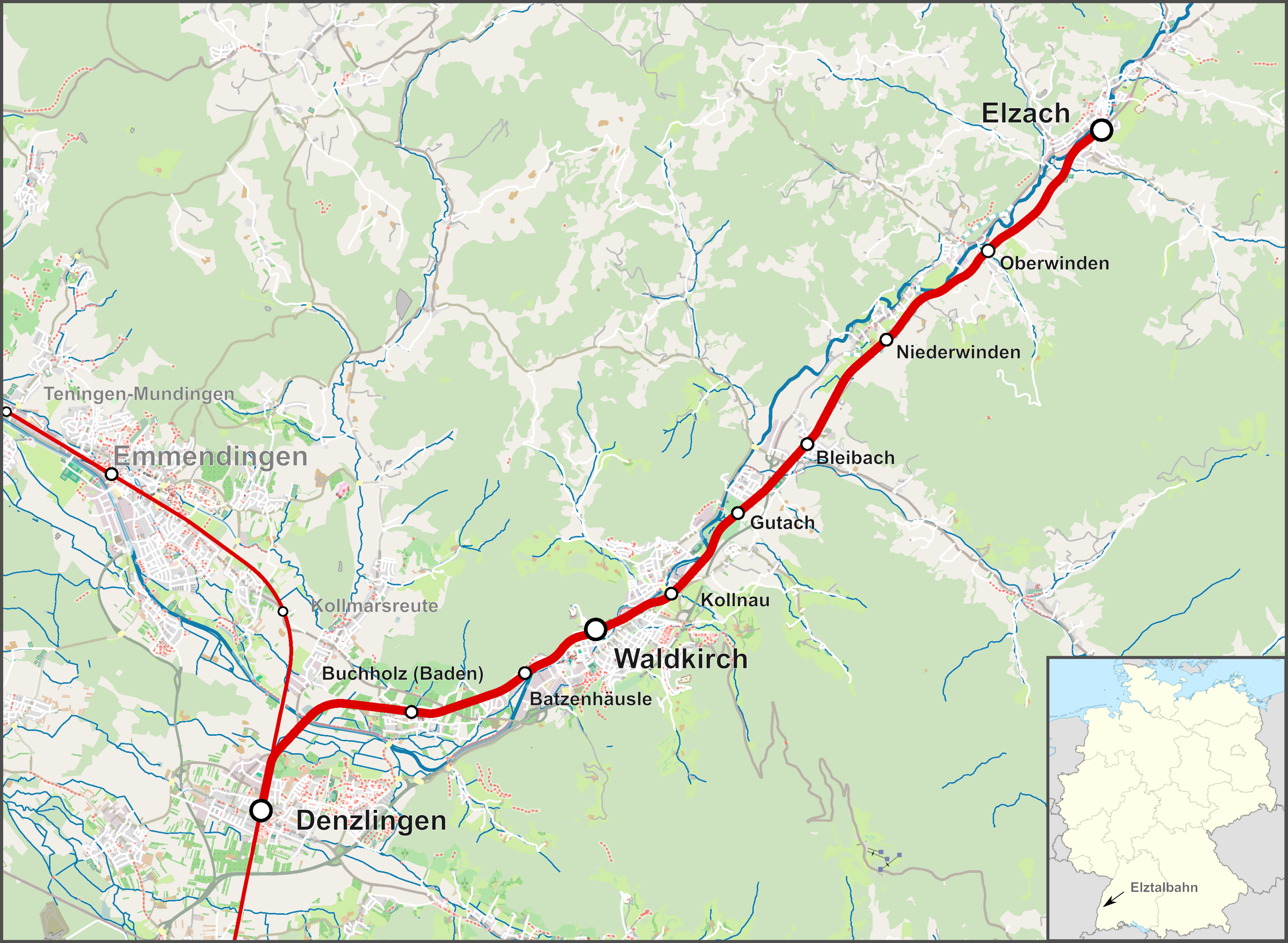

Overview
- Line number: 4311

Service
- Route number: 726

Technical
- Line length: 19.3 km (12.0 mi)
- Track gauge: 1,435 mm (4 ft 8 1/2 in)
- Minimum radius: 450 m (1,476 ft)
- Operating speed: 100 km/h (62 mph) (max)

The Elz Valley Railway (German: Elztalbahn) is a 19.3 km (12.0 mi) long, single-tracked, standard gauge branch line in the Black Forest area of the German state of Baden-Württemberg. The line branches off the Freiburg im Breisgau to Offenburg section of the Rhine Valley Railway at Denzlingen and runs up the valley of the River Elz to Waldkirch and Elzach.

Whilst the track is owned by DB Netz AG, passenger services on the Elztalbahn are provided by the Breisgau S-Bahn, whose trains continue over the Upper Rhine Valley line to Freiburg Central Station. Typical service is two trains per hour from Freiburg to Waldkirch, with one train continuing to Elzach.

== History ==
Because no private investors were willing to finance a connection to the Elz Valley, the town of Waldkirch took the initiative and had the 7.1 kilometre-long line from Waldkirch to Denzlingen built as a private railway. The Baden government established the legal basis for the construction on 30 March 1872 and a concession for it was granted on 29 August of the same year. Operation of the line, which was opened on 1 January 1875, was transferred to the Grand Duchy of Baden State Railways (Großherzoglich Badische Staatseisenbahnen) in 1887.

=== Extension to Elzach ===
Although traffic—especially passenger transport—developed satisfactorily, the financial burden for the town of Waldkirch was too high in the long run. So it gratefully accepted the offer of the state to purchase the railway on 1 April 1886. The Elz Valley Railway was extended by twelve kilometres to its current terminus in Elzach in 20 August 1901. An electrified 750 mm gauge railway to the Gütermann sewing thread factory connected at Gutach station. Different options for an extension via Oberprechtal to Hausach were often planned—most recently in the 1950s—but never realised.

=== Pilot line for the Breisgau S-Bahn ===
In 1997 the Elz Valley Railway was selected by the Zweckverband Regionalverkehr Breisgau (Breisgau regional transport association, ZRF) together with the Freiburg–Breisach railway, as a pilot line for the Breisgau-S-Bahn 2005 integrated regional transport concept. In the following years the passenger service was expanded and the railway facilities were completely refurbished and renewed. As a first step, operations were closed on Sundays in 1997. Two years later, an hourly service was introduced to Elzach, with additional trains between Freiburg and Waldkirch. The planned improvements to the service were implemented in December 2001 with half-hourly services to Waldkirch and hourly services to Elzach on workdays. In the evenings and on Sundays and public holidays there were hourly services to Elzach.

From May to June 2009 the tracks between Waldkirch and Elzach were renewed. The original trough-shaped steel sleepers were replaced by steel Y-shaped sleepers. The superstructure allows an axle load of 22.4 tons and it should be 70 to 80 years before the tracks need to be relayed.

== Operations ==
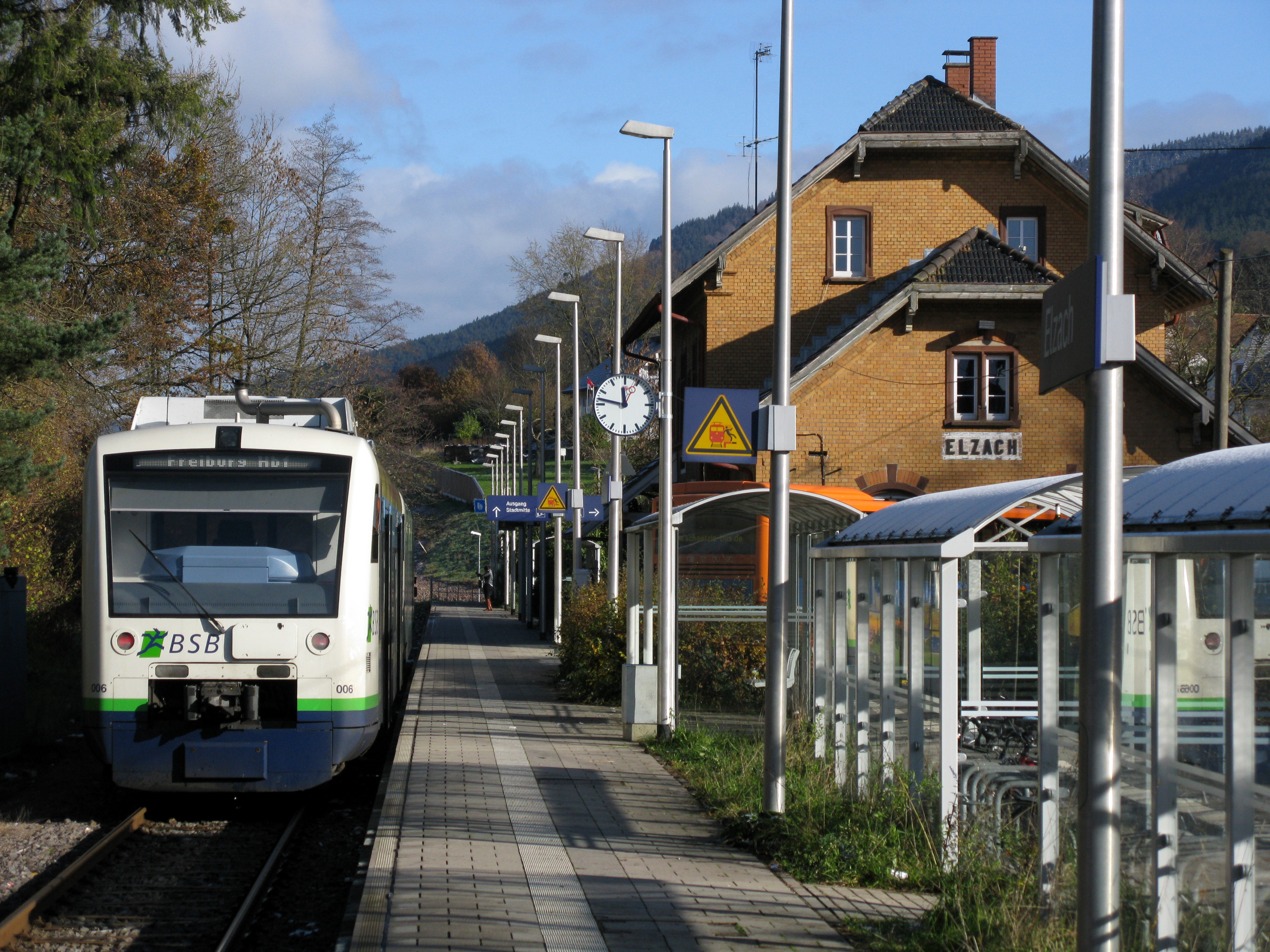
Regio-Shuttle of the Breisgau-S-Bahn at the terminus in Elzach

Today the line is owned by DB Netz. Since 15 December 2002, local rail transport services have been provided by Breisgau-S-Bahn, which was merged into its parent company Südwestdeutsche Verkehrs-Aktiengesellschaft (Southwest German transport, SWEG) in December 2017. Regio-Shuttle railcars run regularly from Freiburg to Elzach every hour with trains crossing in Waldkirch at the usual symmetry minute, that is shortly before the half hour. In addition, there are additional trains to Waldkirch on weekdays, so that there is a half-hourly cycle between Freiburg and Waldkirch, but in the opposite direction services run at a less regular alternating interval of 39 and 21 minutes.

Train type	Route
SWEG	Freiburg im Breisgau – Gundelfingen – Denzlingen – Buchholz – Waldkirch – Kollnau – Elzach
SWEG	Freiburg im Breisgau – Gundelfingen – Denzlingen – Buchholz – Waldkirch

== Rolling stock ==
Deutsche Bundesbahn and DB Regio used locomotives of DB Class 218 until 2002, previously DB Class 212 locomotives hauling Silberling coaches and control cars were used. From around 1960, class V 100^{10} (211) locomotives had hauled rebuilt three-axle coaches, which in turn had replaced Baden VI c (class 75.4) tank locomotives. The Breisgau S-Bahn has been using Regio-Shuttle railcars since December 2002. Due to the lack of rolling stock, multiple units from other SWEG networks are also used. The SWEG, who will operate the Elztalbahn after its modernization and electrification in 2020, ordered 12 Talent 3 railcars which are supposed to replace the old Regio-Shuttle railcars in December 2020.

== Planning ==
The cooperation agreement between RVG and Nahverkehrsgesellschaft Baden-Württemberg (Baden-Württemberg local transport company; NVBW) of 11 March 2009 provides for the development of the Elz Valley Railway. The electrification of the line, the construction of a crossing loop in Gutach and the modernisation of the signal technology with the building an electronic control centre in Waldkirch were planned to be completed by 2018. However, the upgrade, including the electrification of the future S 2 line, was not commenced until 2020. After the timetable change on 15 December 2019, the old diesel railcars operated until March 2020. Afterwards the line was under reconstruction and trains only ran between Freiburg and Denzlingen. A substitute bus service was due to run to Elzach until mid-December 2020.
