= Freiburg freight bypass railway =

Railway line in Germany

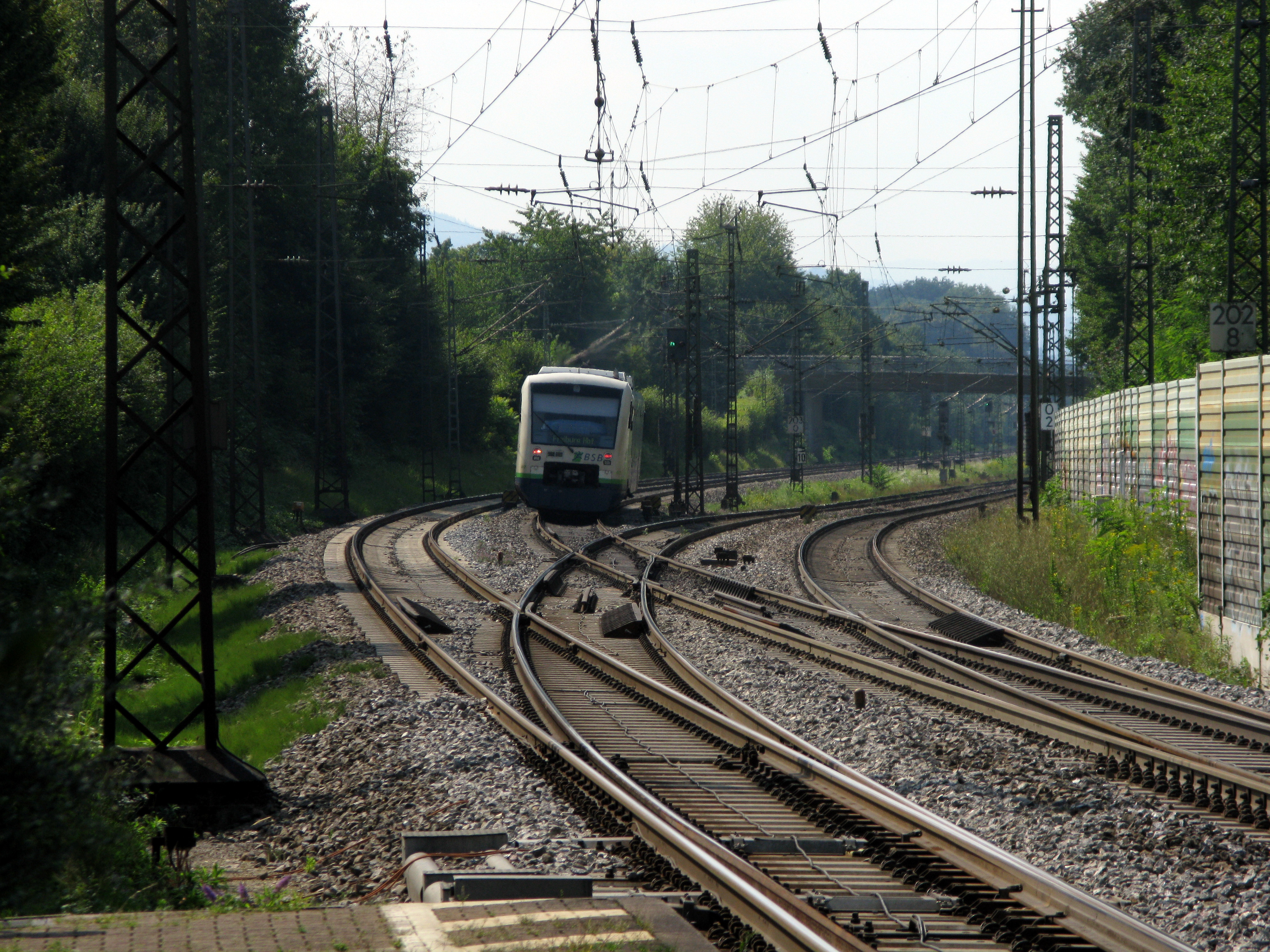
- The Freiburg freight bypass (right) branches off the Rhine valley railway at Gundelfingen

Overview
- Line number: 4312 (Gundelfingen–Leutersberg junctions); 4313 (Freiburg goods yard–Freiburg Messe/Uni)
- Locale: Baden-Württemberg

Service
- Route number: (only freight)

History
- Opened: 4 September 1905

Technical
- Line length: 11.1 km (6.9 mi)
- Number of tracks: 2 (throughout)
- Track gauge: 1,435 mm (4 ft 8 1/2 in) standard gauge
- Electrification: 15 kV/16.7 Hz AC overhead catenary
Route map
- Source: German railway atlas

The Freiburg freight bypass railway is a line used only for freight transport to the west of Freiburg im Breisgau. The freight bypass railway allows freight trains to bypass the busy Freiburg Central Station (Hauptbahnhof) on a separate, direct line.

The freight bypass railway is classified as a main railway line and the whole line is double track and electrified with overhead wiring. It has the highest German track class of D4, which means that the line is built for axle loads of 22.5 tonnes and loads of 8.0 tonnes per metre of train.

The PZB 90 intermittent cab signalling system is used on the freight bypass railway. This contrasts with the parallel Rhine Valley Railway, which is protected by the LZB train protection system.

== History ==
The Freiburg freight yard was built between 1901 and 1905 to overcome congestion at Freiburg station. The original location proposed was south of the main station on the Rhine Valley Railway, but because it provoked protests from the surrounding population, an undeveloped site west of central Freiburg was used instead.

Since this area was far from the existing railway facilities, it was connected by a new railway line, which is linked in the north and south of Freiburg with the Rhine Valley line. The new route could be built as a straight line, so it is a kilometre shorter than the old line via the central station.

The freight bypass railway was inaugurated on 4 September 1905.

== Today's situation ==
As part of the new Karlsruhe–Basel high-speed railway, a new bypass of Freiburg is currently being planned for high-speed traffic to the west, broadly along the A 5 autobahn.
