= Elzach =

- Town
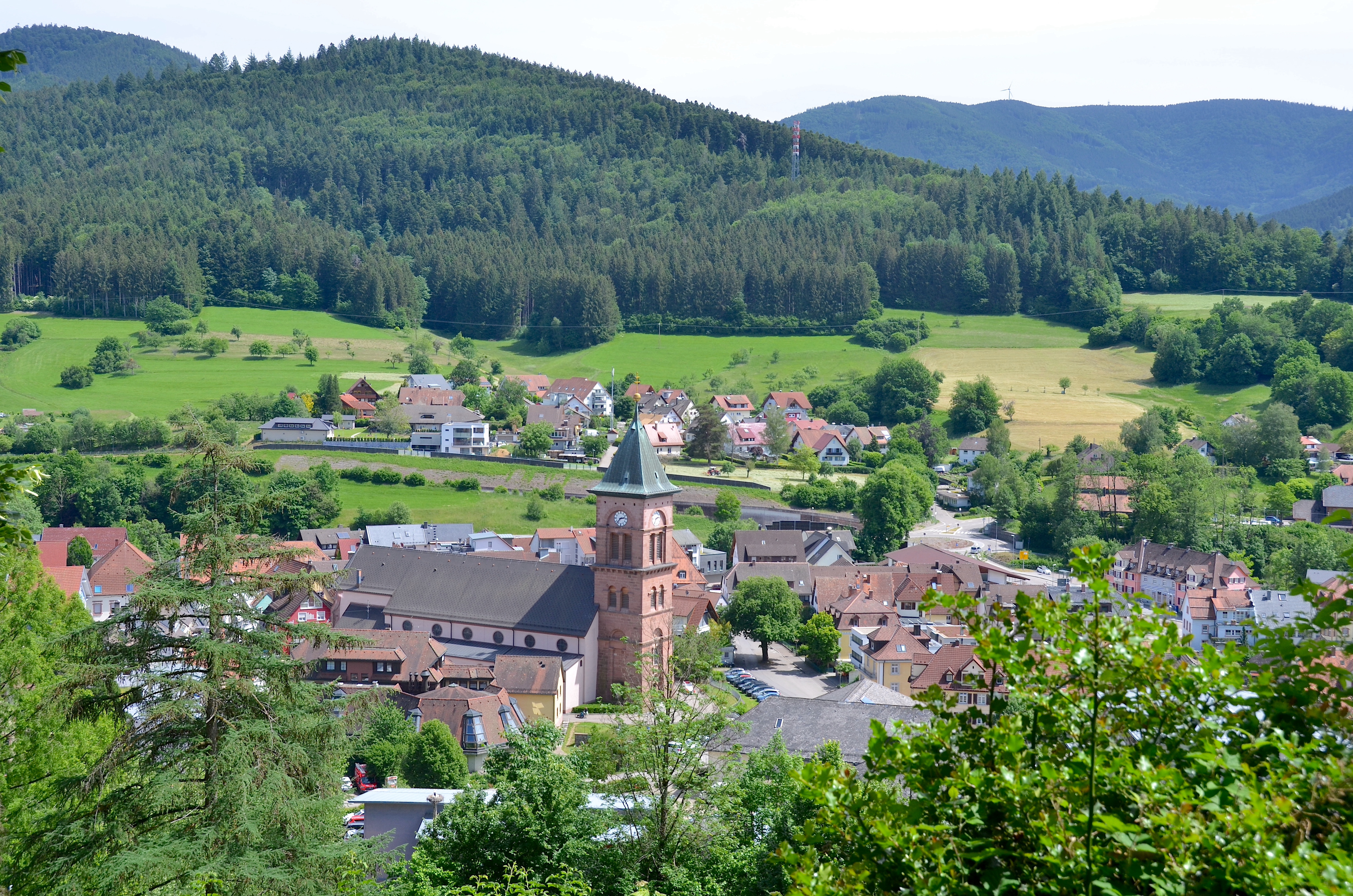
- Elzach viewing direction east

- Coat of arms

- Location of Elzach within Emmendingen district
- Interactive map of Elzach
- Location within Germany Location within Baden-Württemberg
- Coordinates: 48°10′29″N 8°4′18″E
- Country: Germany
- State: Baden-Württemberg
- Admin. region: Freiburg
- District: Emmendingen

Government
  - Mayor (2020–28): Roland Tibi

Area
  - Total: 75.28 km^{2} (29.07 sq mi)
- Elevation: 361 m (1,184 ft)

Population (2025-12-31)
  - Total: 7,576
  - Density: 100.6/km^{2} (260.7/sq mi)
- Time zone: UTC+01:00 (CET)
  - Summer (DST): UTC+02:00 (CEST)
- Postal codes: 79215
- Dialling codes: 07682
- Vehicle registration: EM
- Website: www.elzach.de

Elzach (German pronunciation: [ˈɛltsax]; Low Alemannic: Elze) is a town in the district of Emmendingen, in Baden-Württemberg, Germany. It is situated on the river Elz, 26 km northeast of Freiburg.

== Geography ==
The town of Elzach is located at the eastern border of the district of Emmendingen and borders on the district of the Ortenaukreis and the Schwarzwald-Baar-Kreis. Topographically is the area characterised by the river valley of the Elz and the local hill called Rohrhardsberg. Also Elzach belongs to the Breisgau area and is located at the edge of the Southern Black Forest Nature Park.

=== Urban districts ===
The town has five urban districts.

- Elzach
- Yach
- Prechtal
- Oberprechtal
- Katzenmoos

== Gallery ==
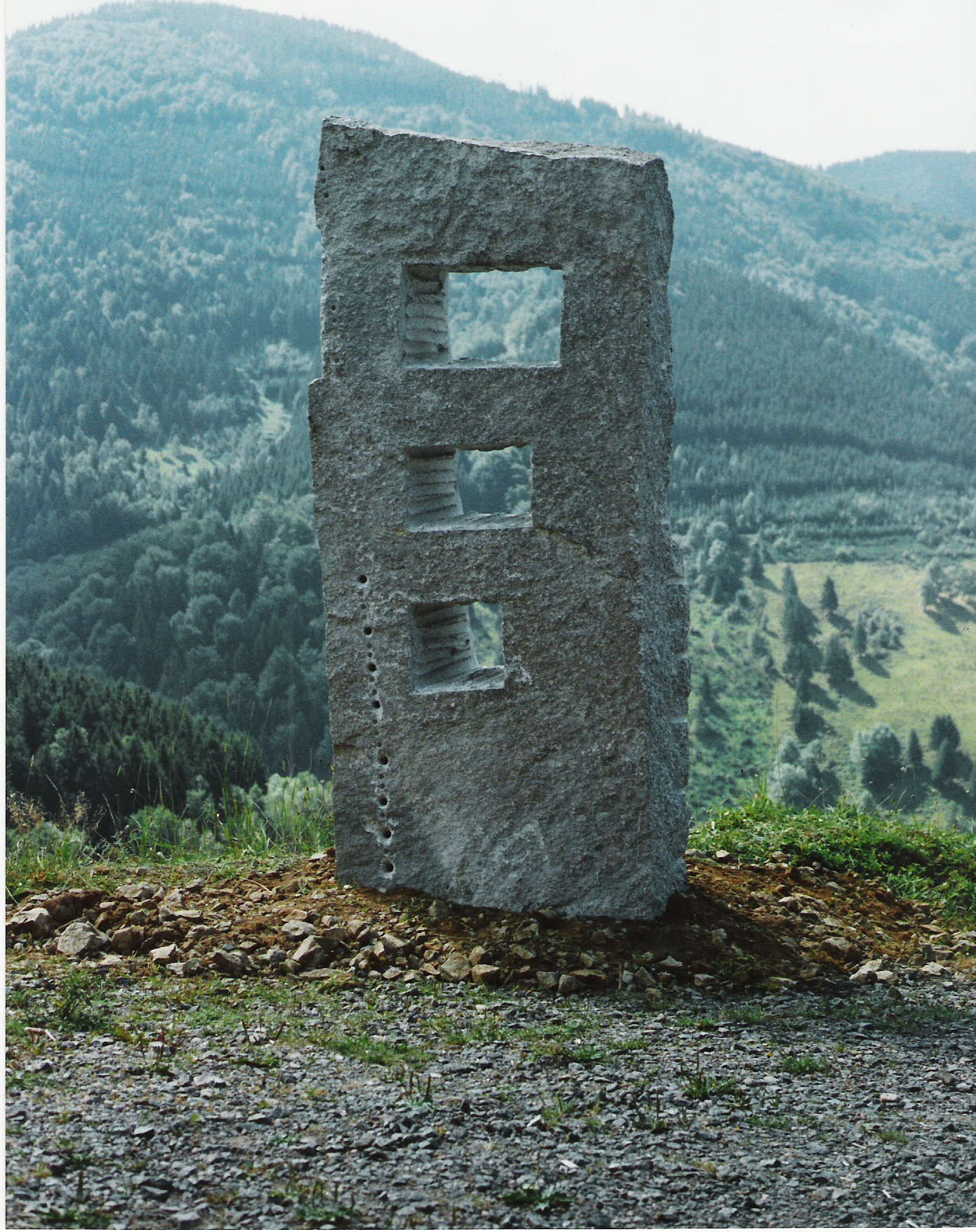
Granite sculpture: "The three stages of seeing" (2002) by Dieter Oehm, in Elzach

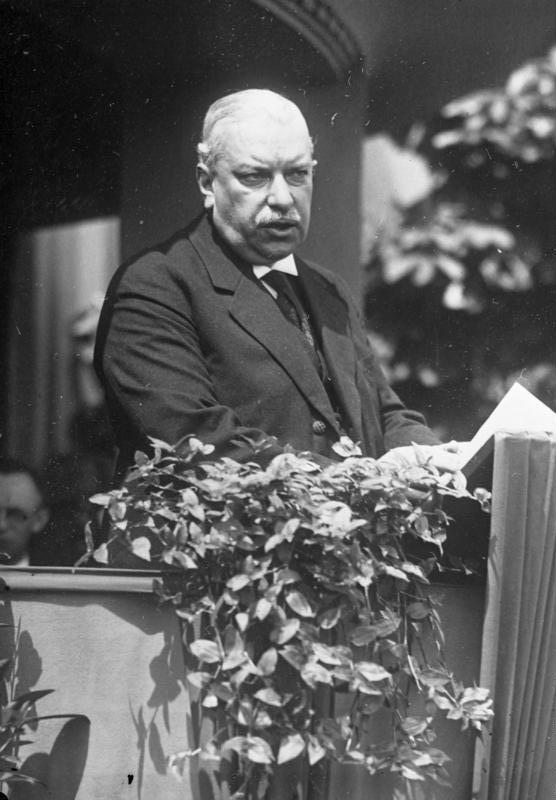
Robert Dietrich in 1930 as minister of finance

== International relations ==
Elzach is twinned with:

Worthing, United Kingdom
Ville, France
Telfs, Austria

== Sons and daughters of the town ==
- Hermann Dietrich (1879-1954) German politician of the liberal German Democratic Party, minister during the Weimar Republic
