= Gottenheim station =

Railway station in Germany

Gottenheim
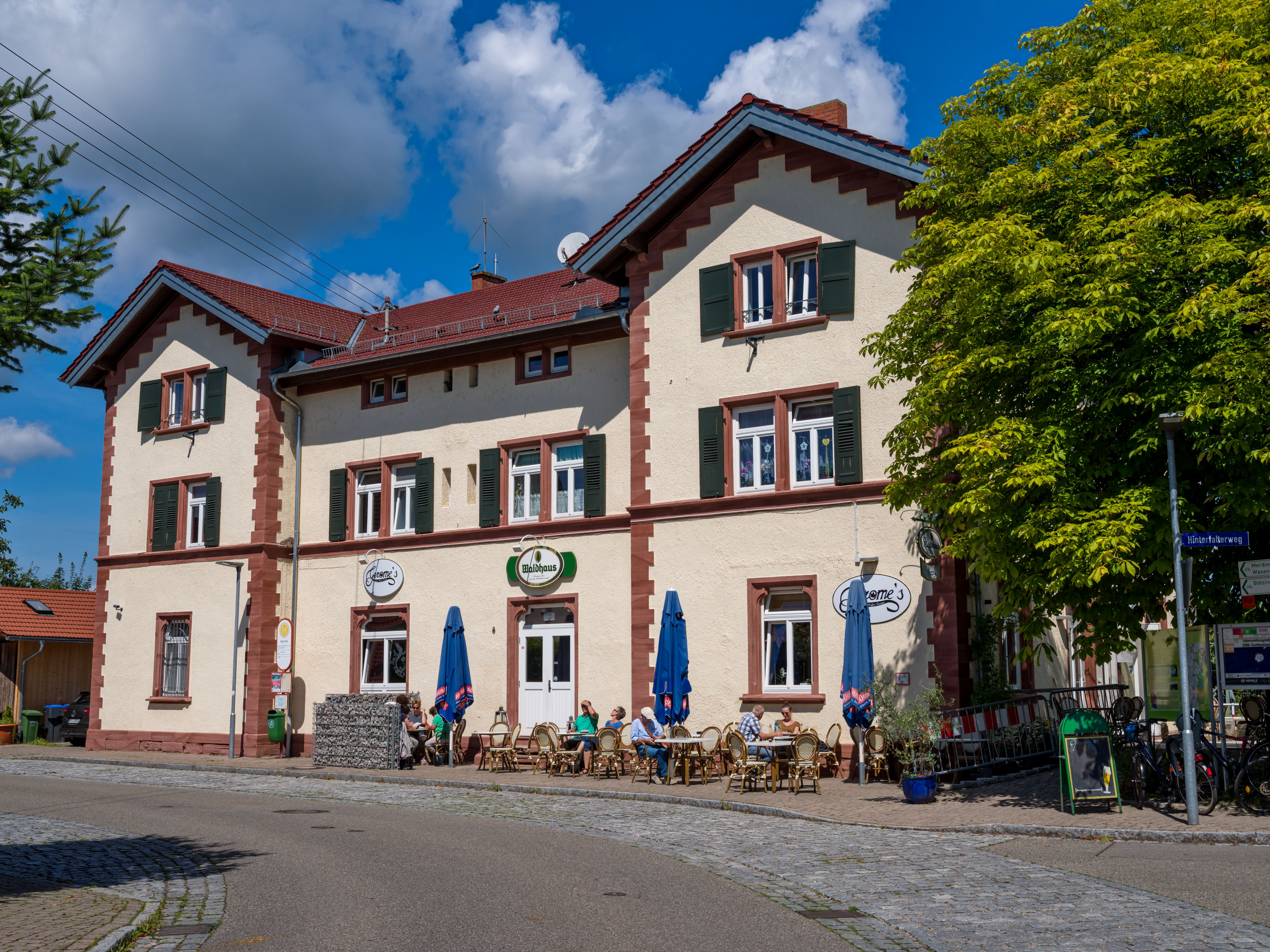

General information
- Location: Bahnhofstr. 8, Gottenheim, Baden-Württemberg; Germany
- Coordinates: 48°03′06″N 7°43′41″E
- Owner: Deutsche Bahn
- Operator: DB Netz; DB Station&Service
- Lines: Freiburg–Colmar railway (km 11.7) (KBS 729); Kaiserstuhl Railway (km 11.7) (KBS 723)
- Tracks: 3

Construction
- Accessible: Yes

Other information
- Station code: 2214
- DS100 code: RGH
- IBNR: 8002334
- Category: 5
- Fare zone: RVF: B
- Website: www.bahnhof.de

History
- Opened: 14 September 1871

Services
Preceding station	Breisgau S-Bahn	Following station
Wasenweiler towards Breisach	S1	Hugstetten towards Seebrugg
Bötzingen towards Endingen am Kaiserstuhl	S11	Hugstetten towards Neustadt (Schwarzw)
Location

Gottenheim station is a station in Gottenheim in Baden-Württemberg, Germany. It is the most important intermediate station on the Breisach Railway (Breisacher Bahn), which connects Freiburg and Breisach. It is also the terminus of the Kaiserstuhl Railway (Kaiserstuhlbahn), which runs to Bahlingen and Riegel Ort.

== History ==
Gottenheim station was opened along with the Freiburg–Breisach line in September 1871. This line was envisaged to form part of a planned European east–west route. The line was extended to the Alsatian town of Colmar with the construction of railway bridge over the Rhine in 1878.

The private Kaiserstuhl Railway was opened from Breisach to Gottenheim via Endingen and Riegel on 15 December 1894. This made Gottenheim a junction station. A year later (7 September 1895) the line was completed with the opening of the Endingen–Breisach section. It was built by a Baden railway consortium consisting of a bank for trade and industry, the Rheinische Creditbank, and Bankhaus W. H. Ladenburg & Söhne, which were managed by the railway entrepreneur Herrmann Bachstein, who merged the railway into the South German Railway Company (Süddeutsche Eisenbahn-Gesellschaft, SEG) on 8 December 1897 together with the Breg Valley Railway (Bregtalbahn) and the Zell im Wiesental–Todtnau railway (Zell-Todtnauer-Eisenbahn) with effect from 1 April 1897.

The Freiburg–Colmar railway operated from Breisach over the Rhine to Colmar in France until the destruction of the Breisach railway bridge in 1945.

In the 1970s, Deutsche Bundesbahn considered closing the line to Breisach due to its alleged unprofitability, but this did not happen.

A new traffic concept was developed for the Freiburg–Breisach railway and the eastern Kaiserstuhl Railway under the project name Breisgau-S-Bahn 2005. Both lines were upgraded, the stations were modernised and significantly more services were operated. The Breisgau-S-Bahn took over operations from Deutsche Bahn in 1997. Since May 2000, SWEG trains have been running on the eastern Kaiserstuhl Railway between Gottenheim and Bahlingen every half hour, continuing to Endingen every hour.

== Entrance building ==
In 2007, the community of Gottenheim bought the Deutsche Bahn entrance building. It was resold in 2010 to a Gottenheim investor, who extensively renovated the building and largely retained the historical features from the early days of the station. A restaurant called Gerome’s Canadian Coffee Lounge was installed on the ground floor.

== Track layout ==
Gottenheim station has three platform tracks on the home platform (next to the station building) and an island platform. Access to tracks 2 and 3 on the island platform has been via an underpass since December 2019. The barrier-protected crossover between tracks 1 and 2 was removed as part of the 2019 renovation. Track 1 generally serves Breisgau-S-Bahn (BSB) trains to Breisach, track 2 the BSB trains to Freiburg and track 3 the SWEG trains to Bahlingen, Riegel and Endingen.

== Rail services ==
Thee Breisgau-S-Bahn, the operator of regional rail services in the Freiburg area, connects Gottenheim every half hour with Freiburg and Breisach over the Freiburg–Colmar railway and with some Kaiserstuhl communities on the Kaiserstuhl Railway (running as far as Bahlingen every half hour).

Operator	Route	Frequency	Platform
BSB	Freiburg (Breisgau) – Gottenheim – Breisach	30 minutes	1 (towards Breisach); 2 (towards Freiburg)
SWEG	Gottenheim – Bötzingen – Eichstetten – Bahlingen – Riegel Ort – Endingen	30 minutes (Gottenheim–Bahlingen); 60 minutes (Bahlingen–Endingen)	3
