= Riegel-Malterdingen station =

Train station in Baden-Württemberg, Germany

Riegel-Malterdingen

General information
- Location: Bahnhofstr. 2a, Riegel, Baden-Württemberg; Germany
- Coordinates: 48°09′08″N 7°46′10″E
- Owner: Deutsche Bahn
- Operator: DB Netz; DB Station&Service
- Lines: Mannheim–Karlsruhe–Basel railway; Kaiserstuhl Railway
- Platforms: 3 side platforms
- Tracks: 2 (Mannheim–Karlsruhe–Basel railway); 1 (Kaiserstuhl Railway)

Construction
- Accessible: Yes

Other information
- Station code: 5273
- DS100 code: REMM
- IBNR: 8001771
- Category: 4
- Fare zone: RVF: C
- Website: www.bahnhof.de

History
- Opened: 1 August 1845

Services
Preceding station	DB Regio Baden-Württemberg	Following station
Ringsheim/Europa-Park One-way operation	RE 2 Limited service	Emmendingen towards Konstanz
Kenzingen towards Karlsruhe Hbf	RE 7	Emmendingen towards Basel Bad Bf
Kenzingen towards Offenburg	RB 26	Köndringen towards Freiburg Hbf
Kenzingen towards Emmendingen	RB 27 Limited service	Köndringen towards Basel Bad Bf or Neuenburg (Baden)
Preceding station	Breisgau S-Bahn	Following station
Riegel am Kaiserstuhl Ort towards Breisach	S5	Terminus
Location

Riegel-Malterdingen station is a station in Malterdingen on the municipal border with Riegel am Kaiserstuhl, which are both in the Emmendingen district of Baden-Württemberg, Germany. It was opened with the section of the Rhine Valley Railway from Offenburg to Freiburg on 1 August 1845. The Kaiserstuhl Railway (Kaiserstuhlbahn) of the South German Railway Company (Süddeutsche Eisenbahn-Gesellschaft) has run from a nearby terminus to Endingen since 1894. A line that branches off in Riegel Ort and runs on the eastern edge of the Kaiserstuhl to Gottenheim was opened at the same time. The line to Endingen was extended to run to the west of the mountain to Breisach in 1895.

== Name ==
Colloquially, the Riegel-Malterdingen station is usually only called the DB-Bahnhof (DB station) locally. Until 2011 the station was officially called Riegel. The name was changed at the request of the municipality of Malterdingen.

== Location ==
Although the station building of Riegel-Malterdingen station is located to the west of the Rhine Valley Railway, it is still 2 km from the centre of Riegel. It is entirely in the municipality of Malterdingen, but on the border with Riegel.

The tracks of the Kaiserstuhl Railway are located west of the DB station on Riegel territory, but there is no direct connection with the DB station. In the northern part of the station there is a connecting track to the Rhine Valley Railway.

== History ==
With the construction of the state railway line of the Baden main line from Mannheim to Basel, the section from Offenburg to Freiburg was opened on 1 August 1845 and the municipality of Riegel was first connected to the rail network.

Since the station was located outside the town of Riegel, the Kaiserstuhl Railway was built in 1894 via Riegel am Kaiserstuhl Ort station to Endingen. A branch was opened from Riegel Ort to Gottenheim to connect with the Freiburg–Colmar railway. This was followed in 1895 by an extension of the line to Endingen to Breisach, where there was a connection to Colmar in France via the Breisach railway bridge over the Rhine until it was destroyed in 1945.

The Kaiserstuhl Railway was long owned by the South German Railway Company (Süddeutsche Eisenbahn-Gesellschaft) and is now operated by Südwestdeutsche Verkehrs-Aktiengesellschaft.

At the beginning of September 2014, a large commuter parking lot was built on the eastern side of the station (in the territory of Malterdingen) for €416,000, which supplemented the existing parking lot on the west side of the station (in the territory of Riegel). The municipality of Malterdingen bore the full costs.

== Layout ==
Riegel-Malterdingen has three platforms split between two different sections. Platforms No. 1 and 2 are side platforms located on the Mannheim–Karlsruhe–Basel railway of Deutsche Bahn. The third platform, No. 11, is located across a parking lot from the station building and serves the single track of the Südwestdeutsche Verkehrs-Aktiengesellschaft's Kaiserstuhl Railway.

== Rail services ==
Riegel-Malterdingen is located on the Rhine Valley Railway from Mannheim to Basel. A Regional-Express service and a Regionalbahn service both run hourly. Line S5 of the Breisgau S-Bahn also runs every hour.

Passenger services in the 2023 timetable
Train type	Route	Frequency
RE 2	Offenburg – Ringsheim/Europa-Park – Riegel-Malterdingen – Emmendingen – Freiburg (Breisgau)	One train Mo-Fr
RE 7	Offenburg – Lahr (Schwarzw) – Riegel-Malterdingen – Emmendingen – Freiburg – Müllheim (Baden) – Weil am Rhein – Basel Bad Bf (– Basel SBB)	Hourly
RB 26	Offenburg – Lahr (Schwarzw) – Riegel-Malterdingen – Emmendingen – Freiburg (Breisgau) (– Schallstadt – Müllheim (Baden))	Hourly
RB 27	Offenburg – Lahr (Schwarzw) – Riegel-Malterdingen – Emmendingen – Freiburg – Müllheim (Baden) – Weil am Rhein – Basel Bad Bf (– Basel SBB)	Some trains
S5	Riegel-Malterdingen – Riegel Ort – Endingen – Sasbach – Breisach	Hourly
