= Breisach station =

Railway station in Breisach, Germany

Breisach
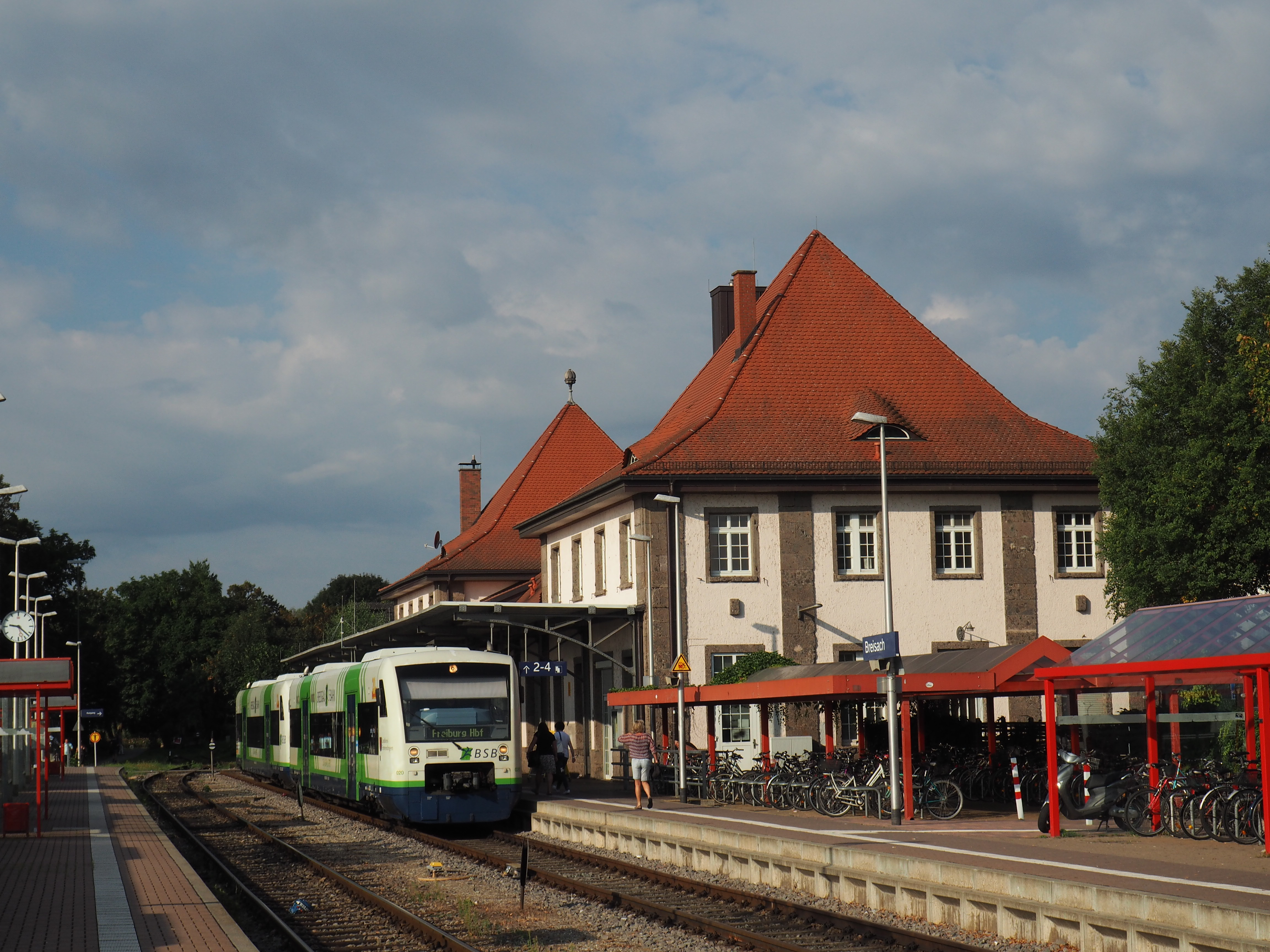
- 2016

General information
- Location: Bahnhofstr. 4, Breisach, Baden-Württemberg; Germany
- Coordinates: 48°01′38″N 7°35′23″E
- Owner: Deutsche Bahn
- Operator: DB Netz; DB Station&Service
- Lines: Freiburg–Colmar railway; Kaiserstuhl Railway
- Tracks: 3

Construction
- Accessible: Yes

Other information
- Station code: 845
- DS100 code: RBRS
- IBNR: 8000845
- Category: 5
- Fare zone: RVF: C
- Website: www.bahnhof.de

History
- Opened: 1871 (Freiburg–Colmar railway); 1895 (Kaiserstuhl Railway); 1914 (entrance building)

Services
Preceding station	Breisgau S-Bahn	Following station
Terminus	S1	Ihringen towards Seebrugg
Terminus	S5	Achkarren towards Riegel-Malterdingen
Location

Breisach station (German: Bahnhof Breisach) is a station in Breisach in Baden-Württemberg, Germany. It is now the starting point of the Breisach Railway (Breisacher Bahn) to Freiburg and the Kaiserstuhl Railway (Kaiserstuhlbahn) to Riegel. The Breisach Railway crossed the Upper Rhine, running from Breisach to Colmar in France, until the destruction of the Breisach rail bridge in 1945.

== History ==
The Freiburg–Breisach line was completed in September 1871 as part of a planned European east–west connection. The line was extended to the Alsatian town of Colmar with the construction of railway bridge over the Rhine in 1878. The trains took about 70 minutes to run between Freiburg and Colmar, while the Freiburg–Breisach section took about 35 minutes.

The private Kaiserstuhl Railway was opened from Breisach to Gottenheim via Endingen and Riegel in 1895. This made Breisach a small railway junction. The current entrance building was opened in 1914, replacing a temporary shed. During the First World War, the line between Breisach and Colmar saw a significant increase in traffic due to military traffic.

Since Alsace was no longer part of the German Empire from 1918, Breisach became a border station between Germany and France. As a result, the importance of the Breisach Railway fell sharply. The Breisach Railway Bridge was blown up by German troops in February 1945 at the end of the Second World War. The railway line to Colmar was not rebuilt afterwards.

On 1 June 1997, passenger services on the Breisach Railway were taken over by the Breisgau-S-Bahn (BSB), which was founded in 1996 as a subsidiary of Südwestdeutsche Verkehrs-Aktiengesellschaft (SWEG) and Freiburger Verkehrs AG (VAG), each holding 50%. As the successor to Deutsche Bundesbahn, DB Netz continues to be responsible for the track infrastructure, while the station belongs to DB Station&Service.

== Station building ==
The rather stately and somewhat oversized entrance building of Breisach station was built in 1913/14 from Kaiserstühl basalt. It replaced a temporary structure that had existed since the Breisach Railway opened.

== Track layout ==
As a former centre of operations of the Freiburg–Colmar railway, Breisach station still has an extensive track layout (as of 2015). A total of three platform faces are available for passengers at the platform next to the entrance building and on an island platform.

Numbering begins on the northwest side of the entrance building.

- Platform 1 is a "house" platform directly in front of the entrance building. It is currently used by Breisgau-S-Bahn trains to and from Freiburg.
- Track 2 shares an island platform with track 4. It is now used by the SWEG trains of the Kaiserstuhl Railway towards Endingen and Riegel.
- Track 4 is on the island platform next to track 2. The track is only used in scheduled traffic in the afternoon for the trains of the Breisach Railway.
- Track 5 is a siding without a platform.
- Track 6 is a dead-end track.

Tracks 5 and 6 can only be reached from the line by reversing on to and off track 4. A siding of a freight forwarder also connects via track 4.

The platforms at Breisach station are barrier-free for the disabled. To platform of tracks 2 and 4 is assessed over a pedestrian level crossing over tracks 1 and 2. Before the adaptation for the Breisgau S-Bahn, the island platform had a canopy.

Some tracks have been dismantled. At the beginning of the nineties there were at least four storage and loading tracks. The Kaiserstuhl Railway originally had its own station northeast of the current tracks, to the east of the station building. The company's own line was abandoned in 1960 and the line from Riegel merged with the Deutsche Bunderbahn line from Freiburg at line-km 25.89. The Kaiserstuhl Railway still had a separate departure platform for passenger trains to the northeast of the station building on the north side of the house platform. It had its own crossing loop and there were also two sidings and a siding serving businesses on Kandelstrasse.

== Rail services ==
The Breisgau-S-Bahn has been running on the Freiburg–Colmar railway to Freiburg im Breisgau since 1 June 1997. DB Regio has operated Breisgau S-Bahn service to Freiburg, continuing on weekdays to Titisee, Seebrugg and Villingen, since December 2019. The trains run every half hour. Regio-Shuttle RS 1 railcars are operated by the Südwestdeutsche Verkehrs-Aktiengesellschaft (SWEG) for the Breisgau S-Bahn on the Kaiserstuhl Railway to Riegel am Kaiserstuhl. This service generally runs hourly.
