= Freiburg–Colmar railway =

Railway line in France and Germany

Freiburg (Breisgau)–Colmar railway
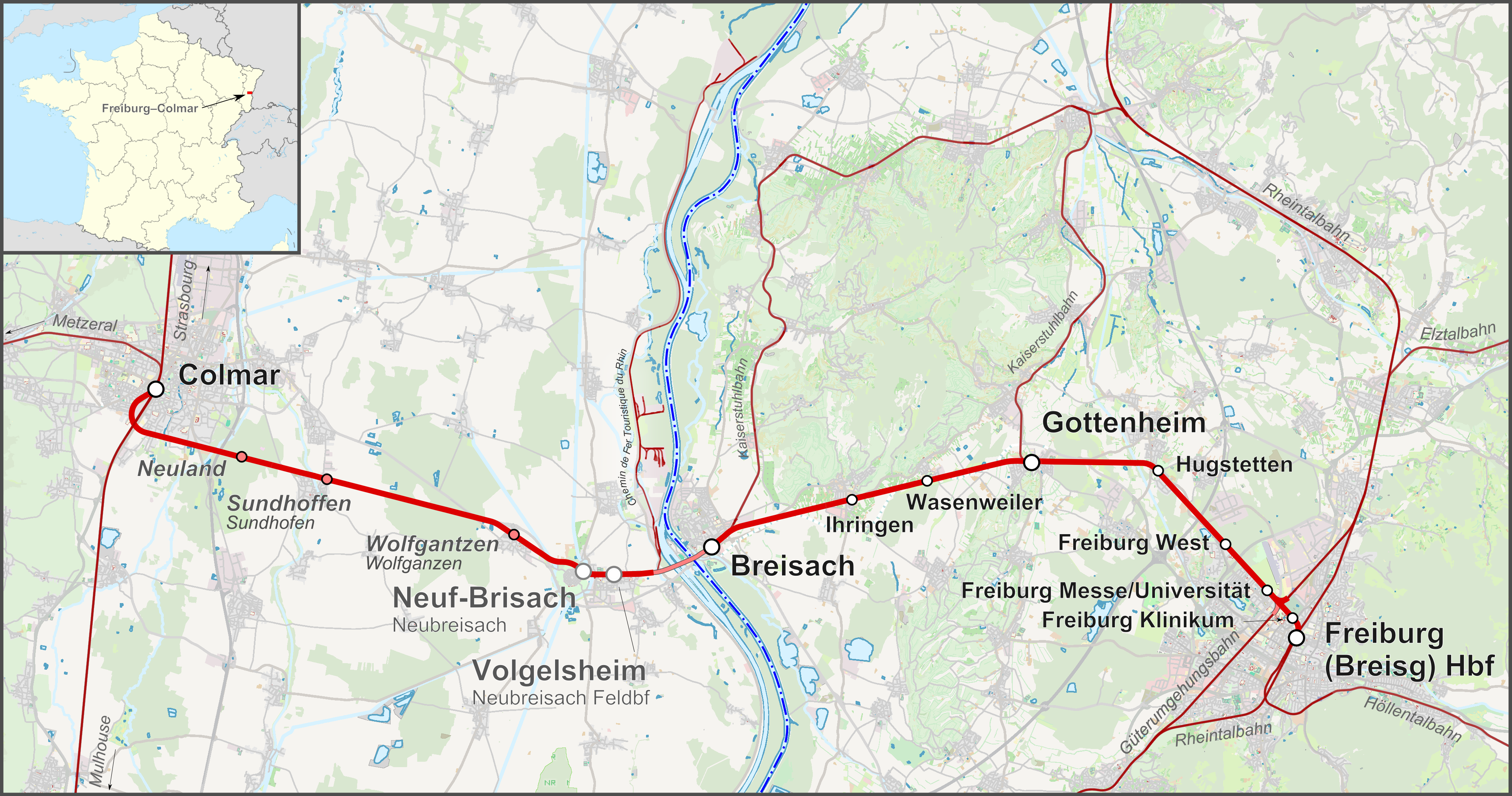

Overview
- Line number: 4310 (Freiburg–Breisach)
- Locale: Baden-Württemberg, Germany and Alsace, France

Service
- Route number: 729 (Freiburg–Breisach)

History
- Opened: 1871

Technical
- Line length: 44.1 km (27.4 mi)
- Track gauge: 1,435 mm (4 ft 8 1/2 in) standard gauge
- Electrification: 15 kV/16.7 Hz AC overhead catenary

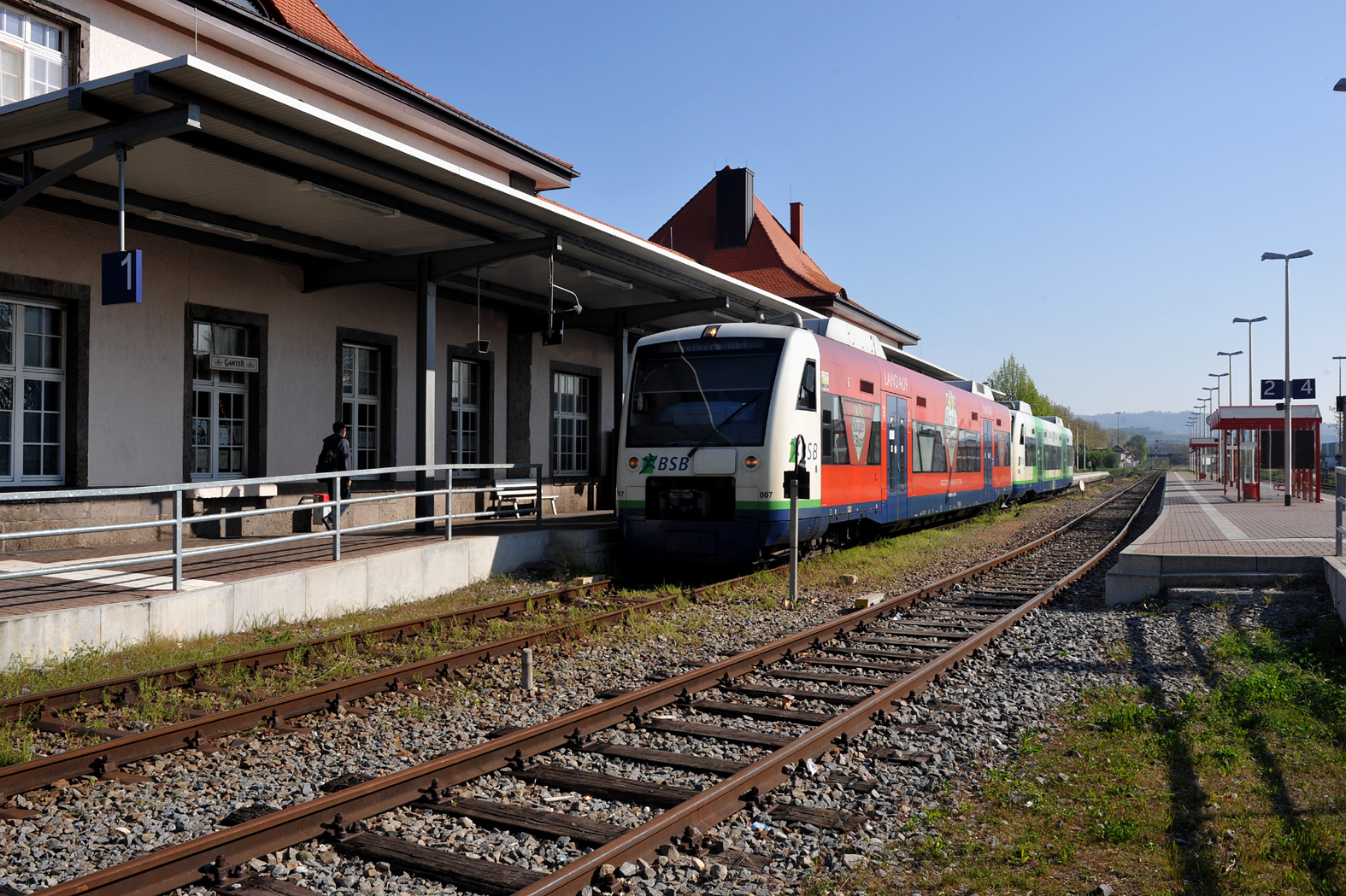
Breisach station

The Freiburg–Colmar railway was an international railway that formerly connected Freiburg im Breisgau, in the German state of Baden-Württemberg, with Colmar, in the French department of Haut-Rhin (région Alsace). The line crossed the river Rhine on a bridge between Breisach and Neuf-Brisach. Since that bridge was destroyed in 1945, the line from Freiburg has terminated at Breisach, and this stretch of line is now commonly called the Freiburg–Breisach railway, or the Breisacherbahn. The section from Freiburg to Breisach was completed in 1871 and the remainder in 1878.

== History ==
Proposals were made in the town of Breisach for the construction of a railway from Breisach to Freiburg as early as 1846. A project for a railway from Freiburg to Nancy via Breisach, Colmar, Munster and the Vosges was presented in Colmar in 1860. The Rhine would be crossed at Breisach using a "flying bridge" (reaction ferry). On the German side, it was planned to extend the line from Freiburg through the Höllental through the Black Forest towards Ulm and Lake Constance. The concept of the Colmar–Freiburg railway forming part of an international long-distance connection from Paris to Vienna through the Vosges and the Black Forest was never carried out. In 1864, the towns of Breisach and Freiburg decided to participate in a company for the construction of the railway. A railway committee planned to build a line from Freiburg to Breisach via Hugstetten, Oberschaffhausen (Bötzingen) and Wasenweiler, but the planning was delayed by, among other things, the Austro-Prussian War of 1866.

On 11 February 1868, the Baden government passed the Gesetz zum Bau einer Eisenbahn zwischen Freiburg und Breisach ("law on the construction of a railway between Freiburg and Breisach") and granted a concession for the line on 21 April 1868. One reason for the construction of the railway was the transport of wood from the Black Forest to the Rhine and coal from the Saarland to Freiburg. In order to finance railway construction Freiburg and Breisach took a loan of 1.2 million Goldmarks at 4.5 % from the Basler Bankierverein (Basel banking association). The route was changed in favour of a shorter and cheaper route from Hugstetten to Wasenweiler via Gottenheim in 1869. Ground was broken on 7 June 1870. The opening of the line was delayed to 14 September 1871 as a result of personnel and material bottlenecks caused by the Franco-Prussian War. The private railway was operated by the Grand Duchy of Baden State Railways from the beginning.

=== Breisach–Colmar extension ===
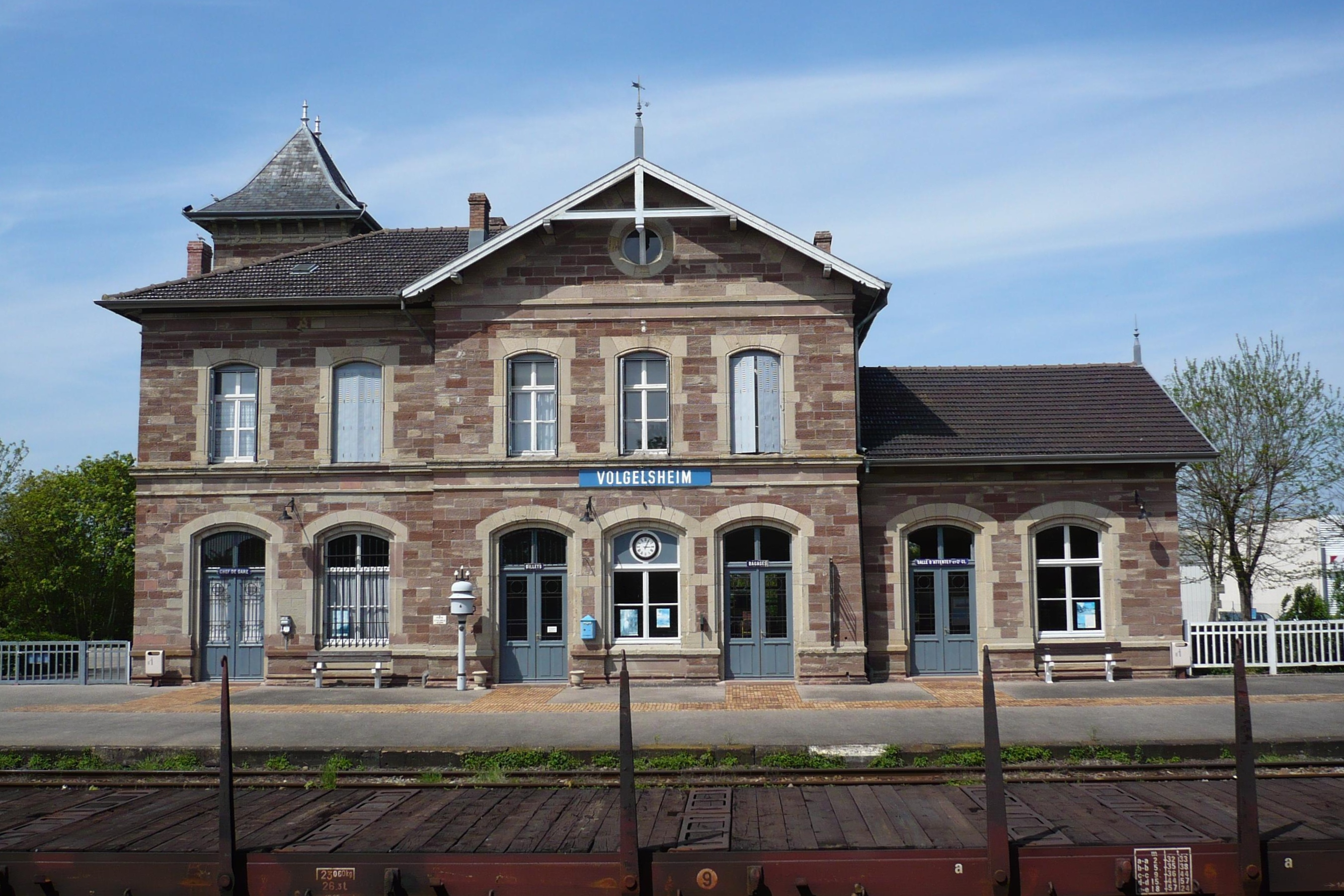
Volgelsheim station

As a result of the Franco-Prussian War, Alsace was part of the German Empire as Alsace-Lorraine from 1871. The war delayed further construction of the railway for several years. Since Breisach was no longer a border station and the originally planned rooms for customs and border control were no longer required, only a temporary station building was opened in 1871. After the signing of a state treaty between the Grand Duchy of Baden and the German Empire in 1874, which set out responsibilities in the extension of the line, construction began in 1875 on the Rhine bridge near Breisach, which was opened to traffic on 5 January 1878. In the license granted in 1875 for the operation of a railway from Altbreisach to Colmar, it was stipulated that the state railway would lease the entire line from the Freiburg-Breisach Railway Company to the middle of the Rhine for an unlimited period of time if the Grand Ducal government did not exercise its right of repurchase. The line to Colmar was completed on 7 January 1878. Trains took about 70 minutes to traverse the Freiburg–Colmar line.

=== Operation of the line until the destruction of the Rhine bridge ===
Since interest rates had dropped massively and the state was able to pay the purchase price of 1,687,100 Goldmarks, the Baden Landtag (state assembly) gave its consent to buy back the line, which was nationalised on 6 December 1881. The Hugstetten rail disaster occurred on 3 September 1882, resulting in 64 dead and 230 seriously injured, the worst rail accident in Germany up to that time.

With the construction of the private Kaiserstuhl Railway, the Breisach Railway was connected in Gottenheim to the line to Riegel Ort and Endingen in 1894 and in Breisach to the line to Endingen and Riegel in 1895. In order to ensure the profitability of the Kaiserstuhl Railway, all rail freight running from Colmar and Breisach to the north on the Rhine Valley Railway, no longer ran via Freiburg, but directly via the Kaiserstuhl Railway to Riegel station on the Rhine Valley Railway. An express connection was established between Freiburg and Colmar in 1910. The temporary structure at Breisach station was replaced by the current entrance building in 1914. The line between Breisach and Colmar saw a significant increase in traffic due to military traffic in the First World War. The Neuf-Brisach–Bantzenheim branch line was built in 1917 at the instigation of the German military.

Since Alsace had been returned to France in 1918, Breisach again became a border station and the importance of the Breisach Railway decreased significantly. In the Second World War, the Rhine bridge at Breisach was blown up for the first time in 1939, repaired and then completely destroyed during the German retreat in 1945. The line to Colmar has been interrupted since then. The current road bridge was built on the foundations of the former railway bridge. Two intact bridge parts were transported by barge to Neuenburg on 1 and 26 February 1946 and used to repair the Neuenburg–Chalampé Rhine Bridge on the Müllheim–Mulhouse railway, which was also destroyed in the retreat. Despite repeated discussions, proposals to reconstruct the Breisach bridge have always failed due to the cost of a new bridge.

=== Since the destruction of the Rhine bridge ===
==== Colmar–Volgelsheim line (French section) ====
The French railway company, SNCF, operated passenger services between Colmar and Volgelsheim after the Second World War, but closed them in 1969. Only two freight trains still run daily from Colmar to the Rhine port near Marckolsheim. In 1982, the Chemin de Fer Touristique du Rhin was founded, which operates a heritage railway service on the French part of the line. This is made possible, among other things, by the Colmar Chamber of Commerce leasing it the Volgelsheim–Marckolsheim line free of charge.

==== Breisach–Freiburg line (German section) ====
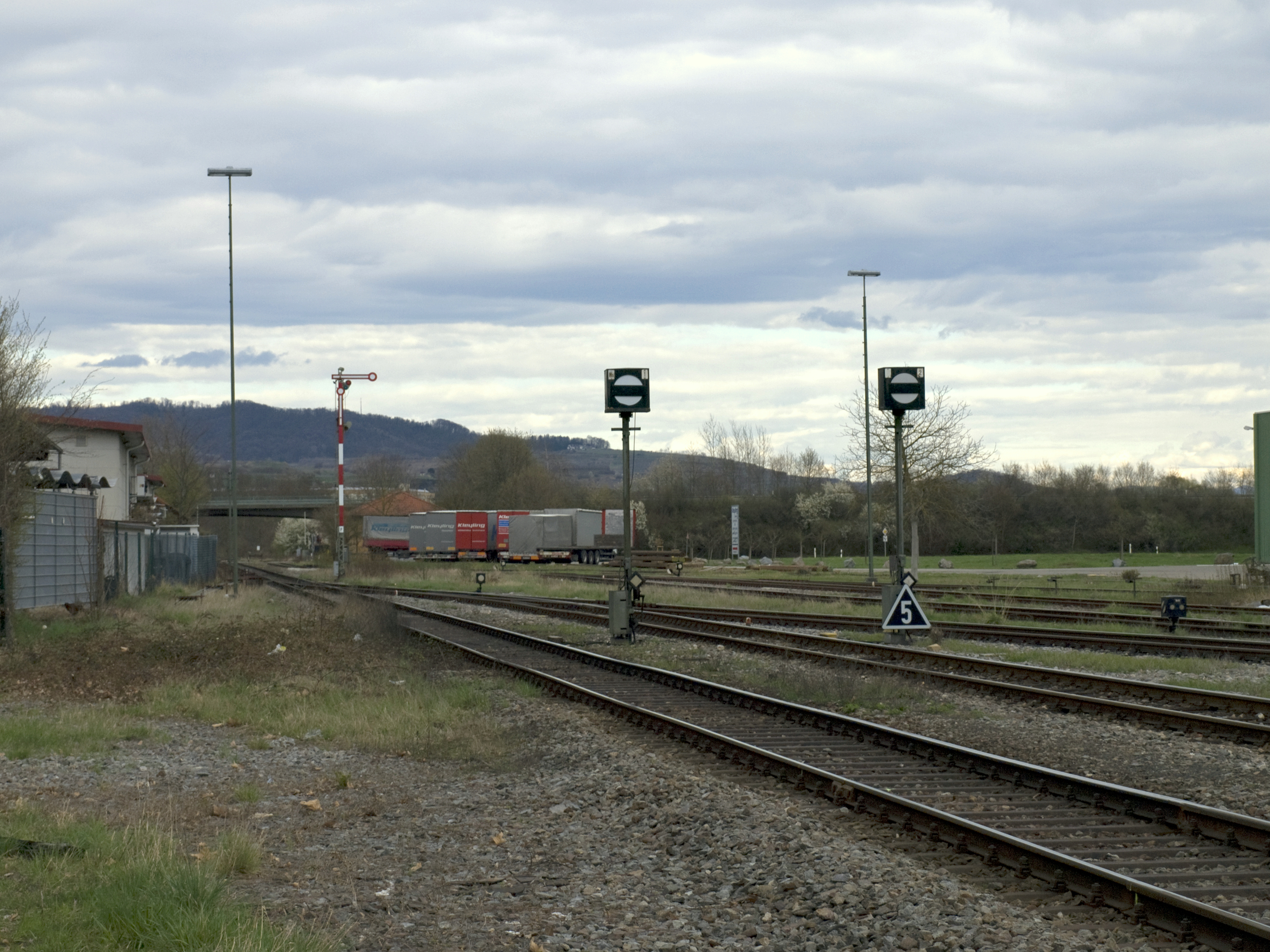
Signals and points in Breisach

In the summer of 1960, Deutsche Bundesbahn operated 36 passenger trains (including ten multiple units) on Sundays, working days and public holidays, most of them one-class trains. Deutsche Bundesbahn for a time threatened the gradual thinning of services, so that the line could eventually be closed.

The line has been in the area managed by the Regio-Verkehrsverbund Freiburg (Freiburg Regional Transport Association, RVF) since 1994. The proposal for the Breisgau S-Bahn (BSB), presented in 1995, envisaged the introduction of an S-Bahn operation with regular traffic and innovative lightweight railcars on the Freiburg–Breisach line as a pilot service. Services on the Kaiserstuhl Railway would also be improved and integrated into the proposed network.

On 1 June 1997, the management of the Freiburg–Breisach railway was taken over by the Breisgau-S-Bahn, which was founded in 1996 as a subsidiary of both the Südwestdeutsche Verkehrs-Aktiengesellschaft (SWEG) and the Freiburger Verkehrs AG (VAG), each holding 50%. Until operations were taken over by the Breisgau S-Bahn, the Freiburg–Breisach railway had always been operated by a state Railway, now Deutsche Bahn, which still owns the line.

Nine Regio-Shuttle RS1 diesel multiple units (VT 001 to 009) were procured by SWEG from Adtranz in conjunction with Regio-Shuttles of the same design but differently painted also procured by SWEG for the Kaiserstuhl Railway, which were located at the Endingen rolling stock depot. Between 1999 and 2003, traffic increased from 6,000 to 9,000 passengers per working day on a line that was temporarily by closure under Deutsche Bundesbahn for a while. Together with the Elz Valley Railway (Elztalbahn), which was also taken over in 2002, the BSB more than quadrupled its passenger numbers from 1.5 million passengers in 1999 to around 6.5 million passengers by 2006. In freight traffic, the BSB takeover resulted in a shift in traffic flows, since the freight trains that used to run from Breisach via the Kaiserstuhl Railway to Riegel-Malterdingen and the Rhine Valley Railway have since been transferred at the Freiburg Güterbahnhof (Freiburg freight yard). Freight traffic has been carried by SWEG on the line to the Freiburg freight yard and to the northern industrial area since 2007 under a partnership between SWEG and DB Cargo.

The cooperation agreement between RVF and Nahverkehrsgesellschaft Baden-Württemberg ("Baden-Württemberg local transport company", NVBW) of 11 March 2009 provided for the electrification of the S-Bahn network of the Freiburg region by 2019. In this first stage of the Breisgau-S-Bahn 2020 project, the Freiburg–Breisach line was also electrified to allow a connection without changing between Breisach and Villingen, which was also on a non-electrified section of the line between Neustadt and Donaueschingen.

Only about two kilometres of the line from Freiburg station to Neue Messe/Universität station were already electrified. The station, which was opened in 2000, was built on the location of Heidenhof junction where one of two curves connected to the Freiburg freight bypass until 1945.

== S-Bahn ==
The line between Freiburg and Gottenheim was electrified from 1 February to the end of November 2019 as part of the Breisgau-S-Bahn 2020 project and went into operation on 15 December 2019. The line from Gottenheim to Breisach followed in February 2020. Mechanical signal boxes of the Einheit class were operated in Gottenheim until January 2019 and in Breisach until December 2019. Signalling at both stations is now remotely controlled from the "Breisach" work station at the electronic control centre in Freiburg-Wiehre. Since the 2020 timetable, services are coupled or split every half hour in Gottenheim (for Breisach and for Endingen am Kaiserstuhl) and hourly in Titisee (for Seebrugg and for Villingen).
