= Ariane Koek =

British independent producer, curator and writer

- Occupations: Producer, curator and writer
- Known for: Founder of Arts at CERN

Ariane Koek is a British independent producer, curator and writer recognised internationally for her transdisciplinary work in arts, science, technology and in the creation of new residency programmes.

== Career ==
Often cited as a world leader in the field of arts and science, Ariane Koek is best known for initiating and being the founder of Arts at CERN (2009 - 2015) – the first officially organised international arts programme by CERN – the world's leading particle physics laboratory, Geneva, Switzerland. She initiated the programme at CERN as part of her Clore Fellowship in 2009 and The Art Newspaper published the manifesto for the Arts at CERN. She designed and directed the programme which includes the Collide artists residency programmes, Accelerate and Visiting Artists (now known as Guest Artists) for five years and designed CERN's first cultural policy in 2011. During her time at CERN she worked with over 78 artists, including the fashion designer Iris van Herpen who created her Spring/Summer Collection Magnetic Motion based on her CERN visit, Anselm Kiefer, the digital artist and musician Ryoji Ikeda who created two pieces inspired by his Collide residency - Supersymmetry and Micro - Macro, and Julius von Bismarck who was the first Collide artist in residence.

In 2008, Koek won a Clore Fellowship at the Clore Leadership Programme for her work in culture. She did her secondments at CERN and at the Imperial War Museum, London. Prior to CERN, Koek was National Director of the Arvon Foundation for Creative Writing (2006-2008) and a BBC staff producer working in both radio and television (1990-2006). She commissioned and produced the last radio play by Anthony Minghella, Eyes Down Looking starring David Threlfall, Juliet Stevenson and Jude Law for the BBC ‘s Samuel Beckett Centenary. She also directed Nick Silver Can't Sleep by Janice Kerbel – the first collaboration between Artangel and the BBC. It starred Rufus Sewell, Josette Simon and Fiona Shaw and was the first piece to be bought by the Arts Council for its sound art collection.

Since 2015 she has worked independently as a consultant, producer, curator and writer and on a variety of cultural projects with international organisations including the Exploratorium San Francisco, USA. In 2016 she was also Artist in residence at Nida Art Colony, Lithuania. In 2021, she was invited as a Creative Director of CityxVenice - the virtual Italian official pavilion at the Venice Architecture Biennale - presenting Witness by the underwater artist Emma Critchley who was the first Earth Water Sky environmental arts and science resident. The piece which she produced and curated was world premiered in the official Italian Pavilion at the Venice Biennale in 2021. She has been also closely advising the Cavendish Arts Science Programme at Cambridge University for which she is a Creative Partner.

== Projects ==
- Entangle: Physics and the Artistic Imagination at Bildmuseet, Umea, Sweden which showcased international artists who use physics as part of their practice
- Earth Water Sky - the three years artists residency programme for Science Gallery Venice funded by Fondation Didier et Martine Primat and which she founded in 2019 and runs until 2021
- A Matter of Painting: Keith Tyson and Claude Monet at the Musée Marmottan Monet, Paris which explored the British artists connection with physics and Claude Monet
- Real Feelings; Emotion and Technology at HeK (House of Electronic Arts) Basel, Switzerland. Co-curator with Sabine Himmelsbach and Angelique Spaninks of the new media exhibition investigating the increasing links between emotions and technology August–November 2020 and then MU, Eindoven March 2021
- Related Realities – Backlight Festival (the Nordic photography Triennele) at Galerie Himmelblau Tampere, Finland - co curator with Hannu Vanhanen, Maija Tammi, and Lars Willumeit

Koek has been on many international juries, including 2008 as nominator for the first Paul Hamlyn Breakthrough Awards, Art in Embassies awards organised by the US Embassy in Switzerland and Pro Helvetia 2014, the Architectural Association Design Research Lab Jury (2017 and 2018), the Backlight Photo Festival 2020, and the jury for the Special Panasonic Prize at YouFab Global Creative Awards in Japan 2021. She lectures widely on arts and science internationally, including the School of the Art Institute of Chicago, USA, and has chaired conferences, including the Hay Festival for Literature.

Koek is a cultural board member of Joint Research Centre (JRC – European Commission's science for policy service). She is also a Global Advisory Board member of the Edgelands Institute - a pop-up institution looking at the social contract in the digital age. She was a former policy advisor to the European Commission's IT Directorate DG C-NCT.

Koek is a Salzburg Global Fellow and was elected as a member of the Forum D’Avignon – the French cultural think tank.

== Publications ==
- Levent Çalikoglu, H.G. Masters and Ariane Koek (2013). NURI KUZUCAN ISTHK - HKIST
- Rosi Braidotti, Elena Filipovic, Ariane Koek, Lawrence Krauss, Dieter Roelstraete, Michael Taussig (2016). Goshka Macuga: Before the Beginning and After the End
- Various including Susan Hiller, Elfriede Jelinek, Ariane Koek, Kaori Kuwabara, Andreas Lechtaler, Yoko Ono, Cornelia Providoli, Pipilotti Rist, Nadia Schneider Willen, Änne Söll, Kurt Stadler, Martin Suter, Mirjam Varadinis, Magdalena Vukovic, Katie Walser, Stefan Wiesner, Susanne Zahnd (2016). Pipilotti Rist: Your Saliva is My Diving Suit in the Ocean of Pain
- Ariane Koek (2017). Invisible: The inside story of the making of Arts at CERN
- Ariane Koek, (2019). Reconfiguring CERN
- Ariane Koek editor and writer. Also including essays by Caro Rovelli, Philip Ball, Nicola Triscott and Gavin Parkinson. (2019). Entangle: Physics and the Artistic Imagination
- Antonio Damasio, Cecile B Evans and Ariane Koek (2020). Real Feelings: Emotion and Technology
- Jörg Colberg, David Keith, Ariane Koek and Pia Littmann (2021). In Elements - Sjoerd Knibbler
- Bruce Stirling, Ariane Koek, Julie Decker, Edward Tenner, Michael John Gorman, Alla Afimova, William L Fox (2021). Thought Experiments: The Art of Jonathon Keats
- Mariele Neudecker, Úna McCarthy, Ariane Koek, Kerstin Mey, Greer Crawley (2021). “Mariele Neudecker: Sediment”.
- Phoebe Greenburg, Marie Brassard, Ryoji Ikeda, Ariane Koek, F. Lajeunesse, P. Raphael (2022). “The Infinite: Living Among the Stars”.
- Elisa Aaltola, Chris Fite-Wassilak, Ariane Koek, Astrida Neimanis, Minna Salami (2021). "A I S T I T / coming to our senses".
- Keith Tyson, Michael Archer, Matthew Collings, Ariane Koek, Mark Rappolt, Beatrix Ruf (2022). "Iterations and Variations: Keith Tyson".
