= Emmendingen station =

Railway station in Germany

Emmendingen
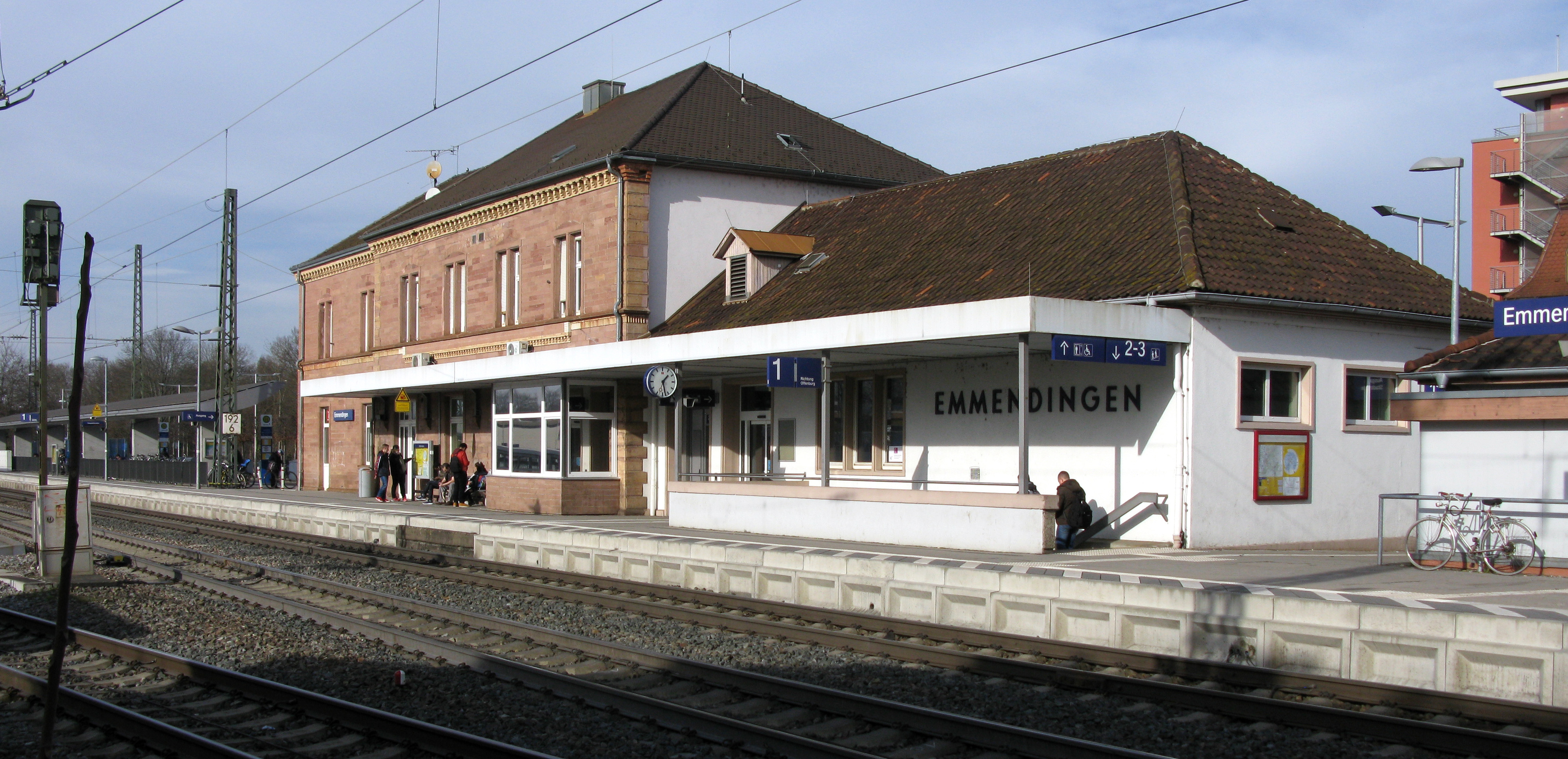

General information
- Location: Bahnhofstr. 7, Emmendingen, Baden-Württemberg; Germany
- Coordinates: 48°07′10″N 7°50′53″E
- Owner: DB Netz
- Operator: DB Station&Service
- Line: Rhine Valley Railway
- Platforms: 2
- Tracks: 3

Construction
- Accessible: Yes

Other information
- Station code: 1584
- DS100 code: REMM
- IBNR: 8001771
- Category: 4
- Fare zone: RVF: B
- Website: www.bahnhof.de

History
- Opened: 1 August 1845

Services
Preceding station	DB Regio Baden-Württemberg	Following station
Riegel-Malterdingen towards Karlsruhe Hbf	RE 7	Denzlingen towards Basel Bad Bf
Teningen-Mundingen towards Offenburg	RB 26	Kollmarsreute towards Freiburg Hbf
Terminus	RB 27	Denzlingen towards Basel Bad Bf or Neuenburg (Baden)
Location

Emmendingen station is a station in Emmendingen in Baden-Württemberg, Germany. It was opened with the section of the Rhine Valley Railway from Offenburg to Freiburg on 1 August 1845.

== Location ==
Emmendingen station is located in the town centre of the district town of Emmendingen. Its address is Bahnhofstraße 8. The Emmendingen central bus station, which is the most important public transport node in Emmendingen, is located directly in front of the station.

== History ==
With the construction of the state railway line of the Baden main line from Mannheim to Basel, the section from Offenburg to Freiburg was opened on 1 August 1845 and the municipality of Emmendingen was first connected to the rail network.

After a 21-month construction period, the modernised and barrier free station in Emmendingen was opened on 16 May 2014.

A 49-metre-long graffiti picture was unveiled at Emmendingen station at the end of June 2016.

== Rail services ==
Emmendingen is located on the Rhine Valley Railway from Mannheim to Basel. Regional-Express services run to Basel and Offenburg every hour. Individual Regionalbahn services stop in Emmendingen. A pair of TGV services have been running to Paris since 9 December 2018.

Passenger services in the 2018 timetable
Train type	Route	Frequency
RE 7	Offenburg – Lahr (Schwarzw) – Riegel-Malterdingen – Emmendingen – Freiburg (Breisgau) – Müllheim (Baden) – Weil am Rhein – Basel Bad Bf (– Basel SBB)	Hourly
RB 26	Offenburg – Lahr (Schwarzw) – Riegel-Malterdingen – Emmendingen – Freiburg (Breisgau) (– Schallstadt – Müllheim (Baden) – Neuenburg (Baden))	Every two hours
RB 27	Offenburg – Lahr (Schwarzw) – Riegel-Malterdingen – Emmendingen – Freiburg (Breisgau) (– Schallstadt – Müllheim (Baden) – Weil am Rhein – Basel Bad Bf)	Individual services (Mon–Fri)
