= Lehman Kahn =

Belgian writer (1827–1915)

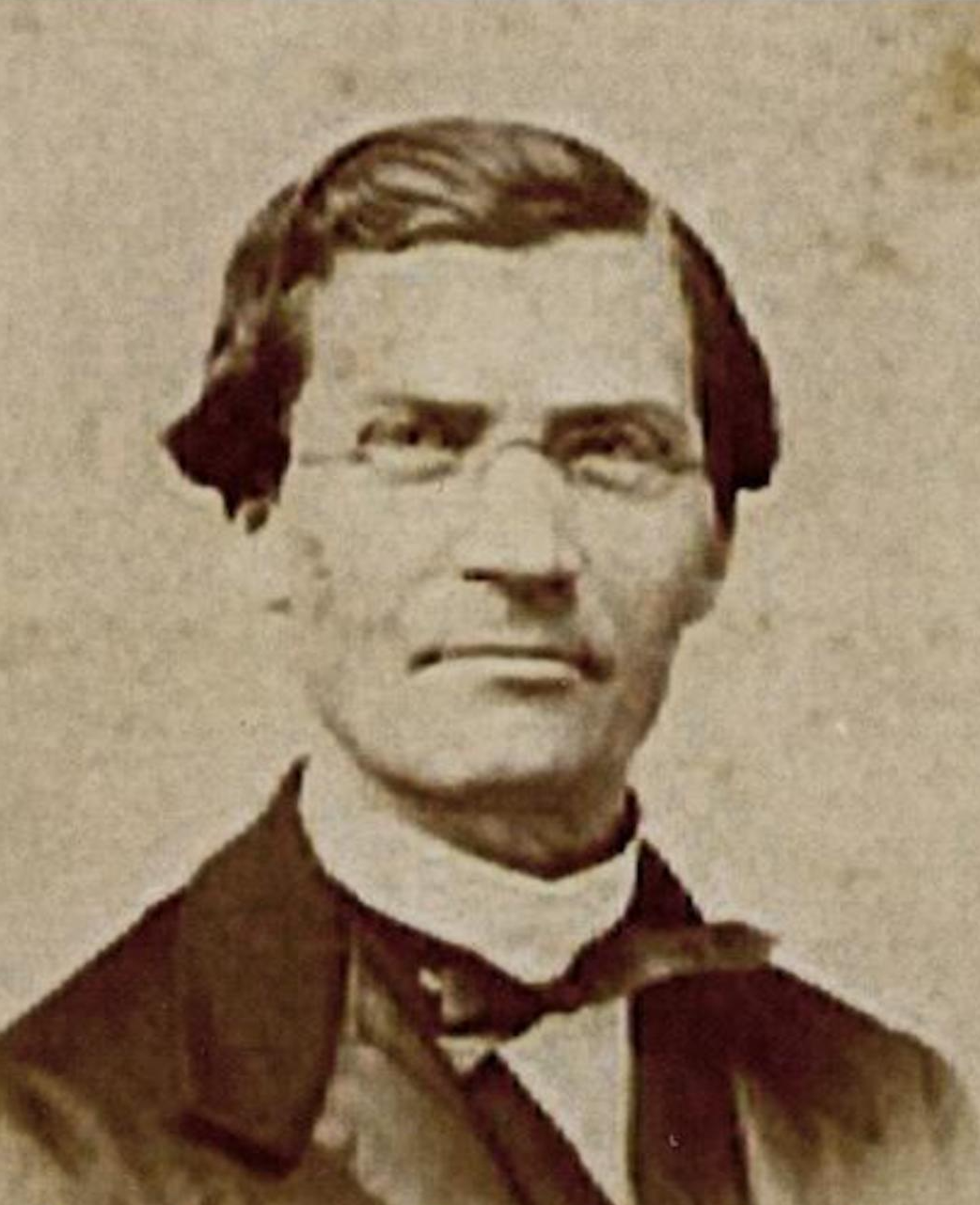
- Born: September 9, 1827; Breisach, Baden, German Confederation
- Died: February 4, 1915 (aged 87); Brussels, Belgium
- Writing career
- Pen name: L. K. Amitaï
- Language: French

Lehman Kahn (September 9, 1827 – February 4, 1915), also known by the pseudonym L. K. Amitaï, was a Belgian Jewish educationist and writer.

== Biography ==
Lehman Kahn was born in Breisach, Baden, to Jewish parents Sara (née Stetter) and David Kahn. He was educated at the Progymnasium of Breisach and at the polytechnic school and the pedagogic seminary of Carlsruhe.

After occupying the position of teacher in his native country and at the Jewish school of Hegenheim, Alsace, Kahn was called to Brussels as principal of the Jewish school there (1855). He also taught singing and conducted the choir at the city's synagogue services. In October, 1863, he founded L'Institut International Kahn, a school of commerce and modern languages.

Under the pseudonym L. K. Amitaï, he published essays on intermarriage, assimilation, antisemitism, and other topics of concern to the Jewish community.

== Publications ==
- Un regard rétrospectif sur la séance du 20 mai dernier et la question des réformes dans le culte public israélite à Bruxelles. Brussels: V^{e} Ch. Vanderauwera. 1876.
- Série de six lettres sur le mariage mixte. Brussels: V^{e} Ch. Vanderauwera. 1877. Translated into Dutch, English, and German.
- Le droit social, appliqué à la question des cimetières au point de vue du judaïsme. Brussels. 1878. Two pamphlets against the plan of the Brussels city administration to close the Jewish cemeteries.
- Romains et Juifs: étude critique sur les rapports publics et privés qui ont existé entre les Romains et les Juifs jusqu'à la prise de Jérusalem par Titus. Paris: Librairie Fischbacher. 1894. hdl:2027/hvd.32044019822659. Awarded a prize by the Academy of Sciences of Brussels.
- École confessionnelle israélite ou école neutre?: étude et pétition. Brussels: V^{ve} M. van Dantzig. 1896–97. Two pamphlets.
- Assimilation. Brussels: V^{ve} M. van Dantzig. 1900.
- Conciliation: suite et complément de la brochure « Assimilation ». Brussels: s.n. 1901.
- L'Eldorado retrouvé: l'état idéal, un rêve?. Brussels: V^{ve} M. van Dantzig. 1902.
- La religion en général, et le Judaïsme en particulier, se sont-ils survécu?. Brussels: V^{ve} M. van Dantzig. 1902.
- La caractéristique de la charité juive. Brussels: V^{ve} M. van Dantzig. 1904.
- La sociologie selon la législation juive appliquée à l'époque moderne. Paris: Librairie Fischbacher. 1905.
- Une question d'actualité et d'opportunité: les causes directes et indirectes qui, dans les grands centres de population, conduisent la jeune génération des juifs à l'abandon de leur religion. Brussels: V^{ve} M. van Dantzig. 1912.
