= South German Railway Company =

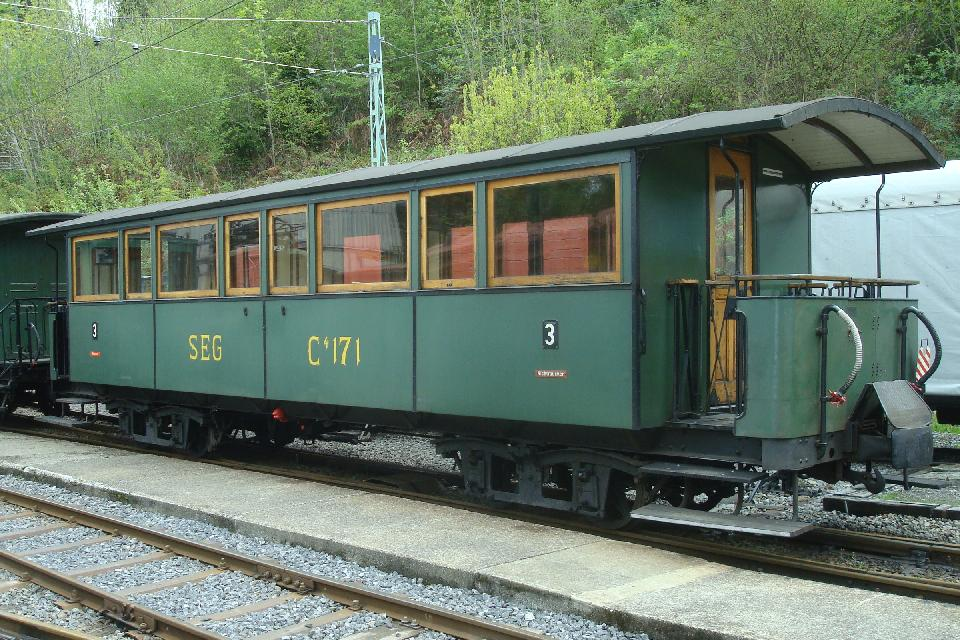
Coach C^{4} 171 of the Süddeutsche Eisenbahn-Gesellschaft at the Blonay–Chamby heritage railway

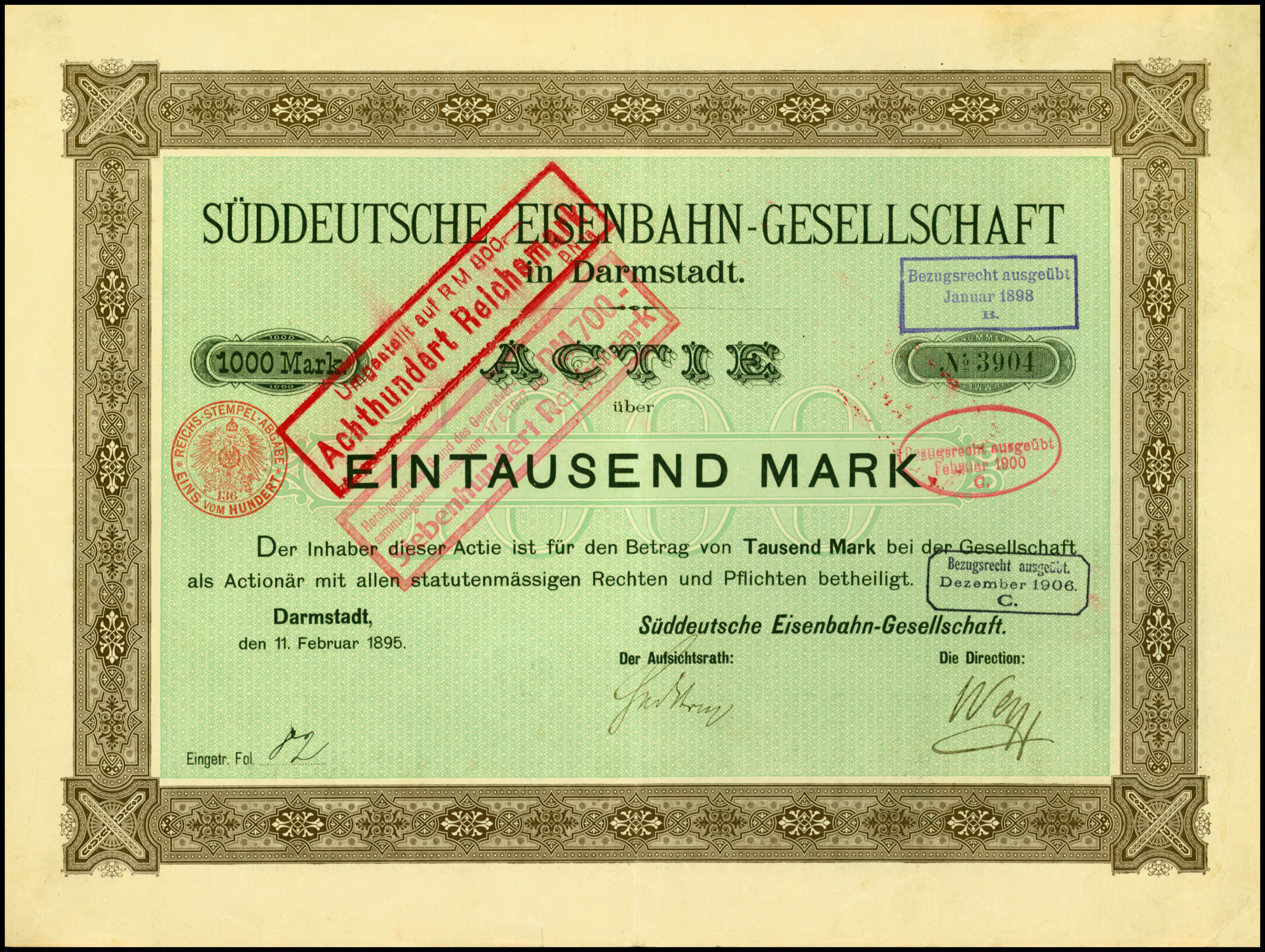
Share of the Süddeutsche Eisenbahn-Gesellschaft, issued 1895

The South German Railway Company (Süddeutsche Eisenbahn-Gesellschaft AG) or SEG was founded on 11 February 1895, in Darmstadt by the railway entrepreneur, Herrmann Bachstein, and several bank managers.

== Bachstein's railway ==
The majority of shares were owned by the Bank für Handel und Industrie in Darmstadt. In 1908 this share was bought out by Hugo Stinnes and other industrialists, who founded the Rhine Westphalia Railway Company (Rheinisch-Westfälische Bahn-GmbH or RWB) in 1909, in order to bring together the numerous tramway operations of the Ruhrgebiet. Major shareholders in the RWB included the city of Essen (48%), the district of Essen (27%) and the Rheinisch-Westfälische Elektrizitätswerk or RWE (25%).

The SEG was formed by Hermann Bachstein with the aim of reorganising the railways in the states of Baden and Hesse that were part of the Hermann Bachstein Branch Line Central Organisation (Centralverwaltung für Secundärbahnen Herrmann Bachstein).

Of these, Bachstein initially brought the following Hessian railways into the new company in 1895:

- Osthofen – Westhofen
- Reinheim – Reichelsheim
- Sprendlingen – Wöllstein (extended to Fürfeld in 1898)
- Worms – Offstein (Lower Eis Valley Railway).

Also included were the steam tramways in Darmstadt, Mainz and Wiesbaden-Biebrich, that provided suburban services, as well as the electric tramway in Essen on the Ruhr, the Pferdebahn in Mainz and the Nerobergbahn in Wiesbaden.

Three lines in Thuringia also now belonged to the SEG:

- Arnstadt-Ichtershausen Railway
- Hohenebra-Ebeleben Railway and the
- Ilmenau-Großbreitenbach Railway.

However these were operated by the Branch Line Central Organisation not by the SEG itself.

On 8 December 1897, the SEG was expanded again with the following Bachstein railways the Grand Duchy of Baden:

- Mannheim - Heidelberg – Weinheim triangle railway (later the OEG)
- Karlsruhe branch line
- Breg Valley Railway, Donaueschingen – Furtwangen
- Kaiserstuhl Railway, Breisach – Endingen am Kaiserstuhl – Gottenheim and the
- Upper Wiesen Valley Railway, Zell – Todtnau.

After the Mainz Tramway had been sold to the city in 1904, the electric tramway networks in Essen and Wiesbaden remained with the SEG.

In the same year the railway network grew with the addition of the:

- Hetzbach–Beerfelden Railway and the
- Selz Valley Railway, Ingelheim – Jugenheim - Partenheim.

On the other hand, several railways were hived off by the SEG to other newly founded companies in the following years as follows:

- In 1911 the "Triangle Railway" to the Oberrheinische Eisenbahn-Gesellschaft (OEG), with the SEG retaining a 26% share, and
- In 1912 the suburban lines of Darmstadt to the Hessian Railway (Hessische Eisenbahn-AG, into which the city tramways were merged (SEG share 38%).
- In 1914 the Karlsruhe branch lines were sold.
- In 1915 the Central Organisation gave its share to the SEG and Herrmann Bachstein left the board of directors.

== Essen tramways dominate ==
At this time – on 1 April 1916 - the SEG firm owned branch lines totaling 216 km (134 mi) in length, of which 37 km (23 mi) were narrow gauge. In addition it owned two important tramway operations in Essen (71 km or 44 mi) and Wiesbaden (48 km or 30 mi) with a total of 119 km (74 mi) of metre gauge lines. In 1919 the Mainz Suburban Line was transferred to the city of Mainz.

Whilst the SEG began to gradually close its tram lines in 1929 due to differences with the city of Wiesbaden, the Essen tramway remained at the heart of the SEG, in which the city of Essen in 1933 had 66% of the shares.

Although early on, buses were used as a backup for rail services and to extend the branch lines, they only produced meagre profits compared with the tramways, so that the SEG endeavoured not to renew concessions when they expired. They invited the German Reich to take over the Worms-Offstein Railway, because its concession was running out on 1 December 1936. This offer was answered with a Reich law, according to which the Reich Minister of Transport decreed that operations were to continue after the end of the concession period. So the SEG had to carry on supporting all its railways. That said, it was able to gradually improve their profitability.

After the end of the Second World War, the SEG was dispossessed of the three railways in Thuringia (AIE, HEE, IGE). In West Germany the branch lines could continue to be operated thanks to the revenue from Essen Tramway operations.

In 1952/53 the SEG came to agreements with the states in which SEG branch lines operated:

- Baden-Württemberg took over the Breg Valley Railway, Kaiserstuhl Railway and Wiesen Valley Railway, which went into the state-owned Mittelbadische Eisenbahnen AG.
- Rhineland-Palatinate let the Deutsche Bundesbahn continue to run the lines, but quickly introduced bus services as well.
- Hesse took over the Reinheim-Reichelsheim Railway, whilst the Hetzbach-Beerfelden Railways was closed.

Because now only the tramways, whose network at times was over 100 km (62 mi) long, and buses in Essen belonged to the SEG, the company was renamed on 29 September 1954, as the Essener Verkehrs-AG (EVAG). This company exists to the present day with standard and metre gauge tramways of 74 km (46 mi) length, but is now called Ruhrbahn.

== SEG Railways ==
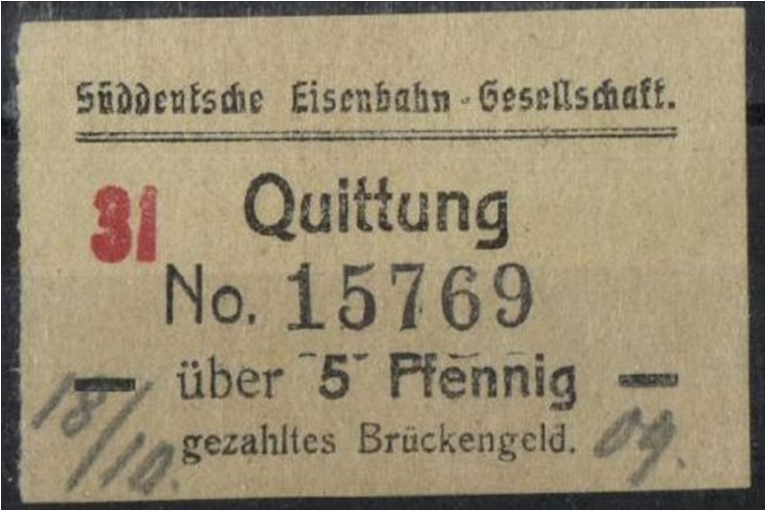
'Quittung' = receipt (1909)

a) Tramways

- Essen Tramways, today Ruhrbahn
- Wiesbaden Tramways

b) Private lines for public services

- Arnstadt-Ichtershausen Railway
- Breg Valley Railway, (Donaueschingen - Furtwangen)
- Hetzbach-Beerfelden Railway
- Hohenebra–Ebeleben Railway: Operated by: Branch Line Central Organisation (Herrmann Bachstein)
- Ilmenau-Großbreitenbach Railway
- Kaiserstuhl Railway, (Riegel DB - Endingen - Breisach and Riegel Ort - Gottenheim)
- Upper Wiesen Valley Railway, (Zell im Wiesental-Todtnau Railway)
- Osthofen-Westhofen Railway
- Reinheim-Reichelsheim Railway
- Selz Valley Railway (Frei-Weinheim - Ingelheim - Jugenheim-Partenheim)
- Sprendlingen–Fürfeld
- Lower Eis Valley Railway (Worms-Offstein Railway)

In addition the following formerly belonged to the SEG:

- Mannheim-Heidelberg-Weinheim-Mannheim Railway, later Oberrheinische Eisenbahn-Gesellschaft (OEG)
- Darmstadt-Griesheim-Eberstadt, later Hessische Eisenbahn-Aktiengesellschaft (HEAG)
- Karlsruhe branch line

== See also ==
- History of rail transport in Germany

== Sources ==
- Walter Borchmeyer: 40 Jahre Süddeutsche Eisenbahn-Gesellschaft, Essen 1935 (Nachdruck Darmstadt 1995)
