= Freiburg Güterbahnhof =

Coordinates: 48°00′52″N 7°50′41″E

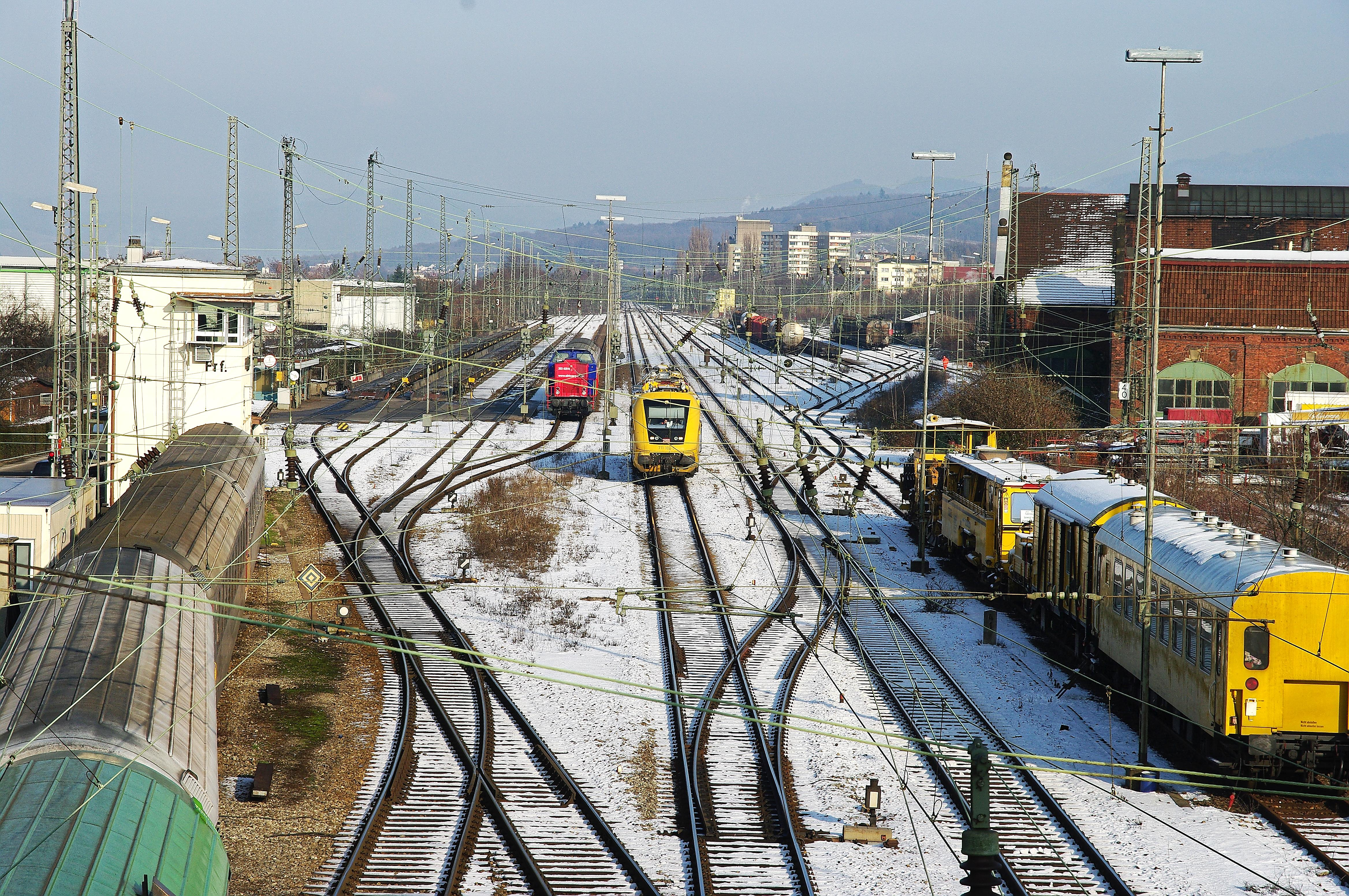
Freiburg Güterbahnhof station

Freiburg (Breisgau) Güterbahnhof is a German train station. It serves as a goods station in Freiburg im Breisgau. It was erected between 1901 and 1905 in order to separate goods traffic from Freiburg's main train station (Hauptbahnhof), since the Hauptbahnhof could no longer deal with the increased turnover.
