= Kaiserstuhl Railway =

Railway line in Baden-Württemberg, Germany

Gottenheim–Riegel–Breisach
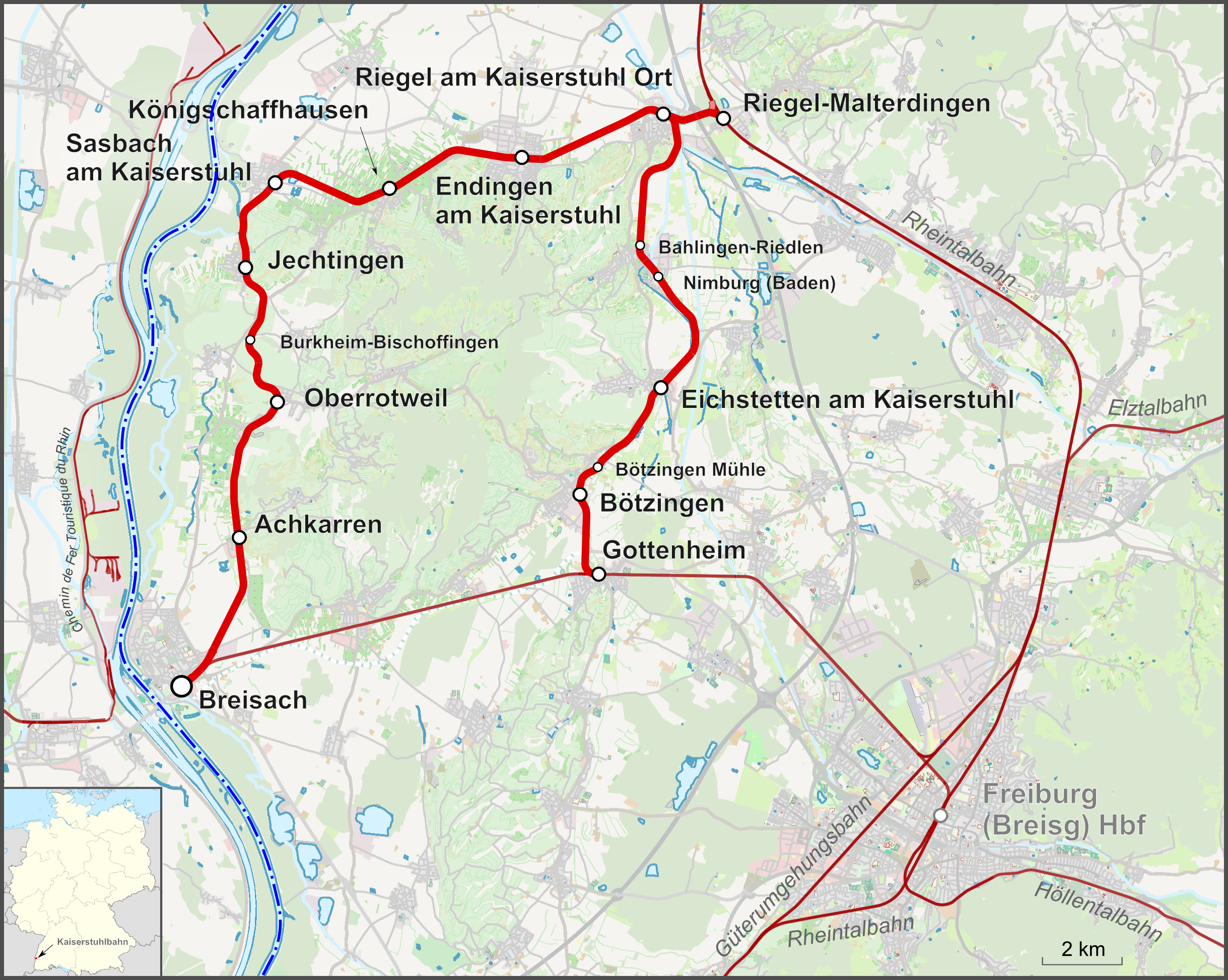

Overview
- Line number: 9431 (Riegel–Breisach); 9432 (Gottenheim–Riegel)

Service
- Route number: 723 (Riegel–Breisach); 724 (Gottenheim–Endingen)

Technical
- Line length: 37.6 km (23.4 mi) (line class: C2)
- Track gauge: 1,435 mm (4 ft 8 1/2 in) standard gauge
- Minimum radius: 190 m
- Electrification: 15 kV/16.7 Hz AC overhead catenary
- Operating speed: 80 km/h (50 mph) (max)
- Maximum incline: 0.85 %

The Kaiserstuhl Railway (German: Kaiserstuhlbahn) is a railway in the German state of Baden-Württemberg. It is owned and operated by the Südwestdeutsche Verkehrs-Aktiengesellschaft (SWEG), which in turn is owned by the state of Baden-Württemberg.

The Kaiserstuhlbahn consists of two joined sections, from Gottenheim via Riegel Ort to Endingen am Kaiserstuhl, and Riegel DB station via Endingen am Kaiserstuhl to Breisach. Together these lines circumnavigate the Kaiserstuhl mountain range on its east, north and west sides. At both Gottenheim and Breisach junctions are made with the Freiburg to Breisach Railway, which completes the circumnavigation to the south. At Riegel DB station, a further junction is made to the Freiburg im Breisgau to Offenburg section of the mainline Rhine Valley Railway.

The Kaiserstuhl Railway is the last, fully preserved and fully operational standard gauge line of the former South German Railway Company (SEG). The line is worked by passenger and goods trains as well as heritage line specials (the so-called Rebenbummler). The routes are also plied by buses.

The railway's operations centre is the station of Endingen, in which the management, the depot and train sheds are located. Today Endingen, as the transport headquarters for Breisgau–Kaiserstuhl, runs the entire local passenger and goods services on all non-electrified railway lines in the Freiburg region.

== History ==
The Gottenheim–Riegel am Kaiserstuhl Ort and Riegel-Malterdingen–Endingen sections were opened on 15 December 1894 and the remaining Endingen–Breisach section followed on 7 September 1895. It was built by the Baden railway consortium under the railway entrepreneur Herrmann Bachstein, who merged the railway into the South German Railway Company (Süddeutsche Eisenbahn-Gesellschaft, SEG) on 8 December 1897 together with the Breg Valley Railway (Bregtalbahn) and the Zell im Wiesental–Todtnau railway (Zell-Todtnauer-Eisenbahn) with effect from 1 April 1897.

After the SEG decided not to extend the concession at the end of 1952 due to the high deficits of all of its branch lines, the Kaiserstuhl Railway was taken over by the state of Baden-Württemberg with effect from 1 January 1953 and incorporated into Mittelbadische Eisenbahnen (Central Baden Railway).

Under the MEG, the line began to be rationalised and modernised with the complete changeover to diesel operation, the introduction of train order operations and one-man operation for multiple units. From the mid-1950s, bus traffic became the second major component of passenger transport and had high growth rates.

On 1 October 1971, the MEG merged with the Südwestdeutsche Verkehrs-Aktiengesellschaft (Southwest German Transport Company, SWEG) based in Lahr, which was renamed Südwestdeutsche Verkehrs-Aktiengesellschaft (Southwest German Transport Company) in 1984. As a result of the merger, the workshop of the Bad Krozingen–Münstertal railway (Münstertalbahn) in Sulzburg was abandoned and the maintenance of the vehicles moved to Endingen. Regular operations of the museum steam train, the Rebenbummler, started in 1978.

== S-Bahn operations ==
Together with other companies, the SWEG founded the Regio-Verkehrsverbund Freiburg (Freiburg regional transport union, RVF) on 1 January 1994. The concept of the Breisgau-S-Bahn envisaged integrated regular-interval services with modern lightweight railcars for the Freiburg–Breisach line and the Kaiserstuhl Railway to better connect the Kaiserstuhl region to Freiburg. Every hour, a Bombardier Talent 3 operates as line S5 from Breisach to Riegel-Malterdingen. An Alstom Coradia Continental (ET 1440) runs from Endingen a. K. to Freiburg every 30 minutes as line S11.

In 1995, SWEG and Freiburger Verkehrs AG, each with a 50% share, founded a subsidiary, the Breisgau-S-Bahn (BSB), which took over operation on the Freiburg–Colmar railway in 1997. All traffic around the Kaiserstuhl was now in the hands of SWEG. The BSB took over the Elz Valley Railway (Elztalbahn) in 2002. A total of 21 Stadler Regio-Shuttle RS1 diesel railcars were procured for the lines of the Kaiserstuhl Railway, the Freiburg–Breisach railway, Elz Valley Railway and the Bad Krozingen–Münstertal railway, all of which are stationed in Endingen.

A cooperation agreement between RVG and Nahverkehrsgesellschaft Baden-Württemberg ("Baden-Württemberg Local Transport Company", NVBW) signed on 11 March 2009 included a commitment to electrify the S-Bahn network in the Freiburg region by 2018. The Breisach–Riegel am Kaiserstuhl and Riegel am Kaiserstuhl Ort–Gottenheim lines were also to be electrified. The ground-breaking ceremony was held in April 2017. The overhead line was energised on 8 July 2019 at 19:00.

Until January 2019, a mechanical interlocking of the Einheit class was operated in Gottenheim and until December 2019 in Breisach. Both stations are now remotely controlled from the "Breisach" work station at the electronic control centre in Freiburg-Wiehre.

In the 2020 timetable, services were planned to be coupled or split every half hour in Gottenheim and hourly in Titisee. Due to problems in Gottenheim the point of separation was changed to Endingen a. K. In addition, there is only an hourly train between Titisee and Seebrugg on Sundays. However, trains kept failing, which was not well communicated. Therefore, a modified, less complicated timetable concept was applied to line S1 between 17 February 2020 and 12 December 2020, under which the shuttle service between Gottenheim and Endingen a. K. remains; the coupling or splitting of trains is therefore no longer required in Gottenheim. This is intended to stabilise the timetable and ensure reliable operation.

As of 13 December 2020, trains once again couple and split in Gottenheim, with half-hourly services from Endingen running alternately to Kirchzarten and Titisee-Neustadt via Freiburg.

== Rolling stock and operations ==
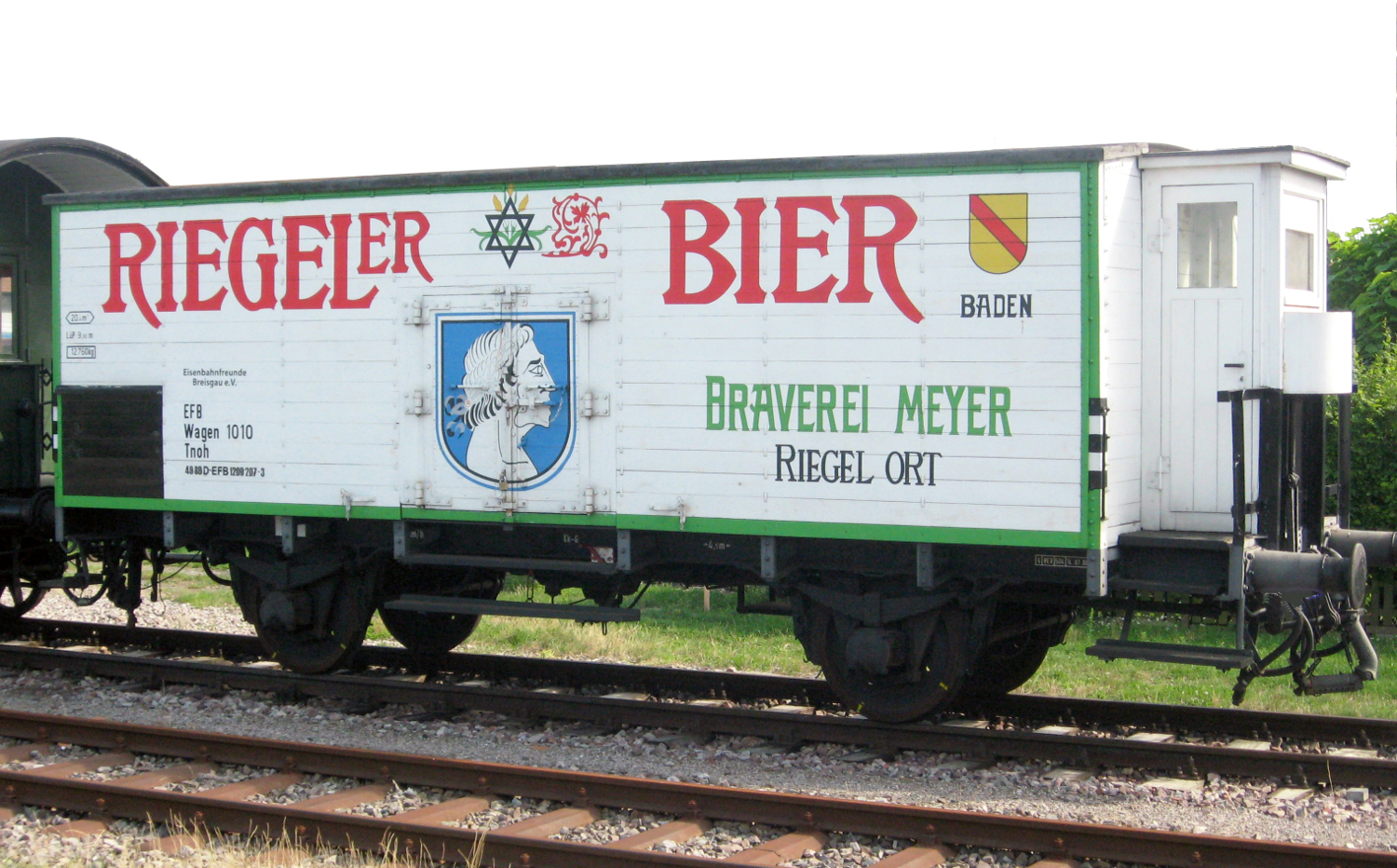
Last refrigerated beer wagon of the Riegel brewery (Fuchs 1928, ex Karlsruhe 545101P)

The Kaiserstuhl Railway received five tank locomotives No. 333–337 of the Prussian T 3 class, 15 two-axle passenger cars with open platforms and skylight roofs, 9 freight wagons and three track maintenance wagons as initial equipment. Most of the freight wagons were later used by the state railway. All vehicles had Heberlein brakes until the introduction of the air brake in the 1930s. An important customer, the Riegel brewery in Riegel am Kaiserstuhl owned a large number of refrigerated wagons for transporting beer, all of which were hired as private freight wagons by the State Railways. The only remaining Riegel refrigerated beer wagon has been preserved as part of the museum steam train.

In 1927, SEG introduced railcar traffic on the Kaiserstuhl Railway with internal combustion railcars, making SEG one of the first railways in Germany to use internal combustion railcars. In 1925, SEG procured a series of six railcars, No. T1 to T6, from Van der Zypen & Charlier, almost all of which also ran at least at times on the Kaiserstuhl Railway and of which the T24 (T4) was preserved as a museum item. The MAN T6 railcar was delivered in 1935 as a replacement for the fire-damaged T22. In 1927, the Kaiserstuhl Railway received the brand-new four-coupled steam locomotives no. 384 and 385 from Henschel, which correspond to the Henschel catalog class "Essen". Locomotive 384 has served since 1978 as a locomotive for the museum steam train, Rebenbummler, which consists entirely of former SEG vehicles from the Kaiserstuhl Railway and other SEG lines.

In 1948, three used steam locomotives of the Württemberg T 6 class were purchased from Deutsche Bundesbahn, which were operated as no. 391, 393 and 394 at least until the middle of the decade. Locomotive 394 has been transferred to Europa-Park in Rust and is preserved. After the incorporation in MEG in 1953, the old fleet of original equipment from 1894/95 was largely scrapped and replaced with more modern or modernised wagons from other former SEG railways in Rhenish Hesse. All steam locomotives of the T3 class were scrapped during the 1950s. This was followed in 1956 by the purchase of a Krauss-Maffei ML 440 C. After purchasing several brand new MAN railbuses, VT23, VT25 and VT27, the old T22 and T24 railcars were only required as a reserve. From 1974 to 1985 the converted standard gauge former DB narrow gauge locomotive 252 902 (ex V 52 902), ex Mosbach–Mudau railway, was operated as V 46.01 on the Kaiserstuhl Railway.

Today's Kaiserstuhl Railway fleet includes five Regio-Shuttles, several railcars and control cars of the NE 81 class, the MAN VT28 railbus and two diesel locomotives V102 and 103 (D 75 B'B') from Kaelble-Gmeinder, which were procured for the Kaiserstuhl Railway in 1985. It also has 15 buses.

In 2014, SWEG invested in the renovation of the rail network.

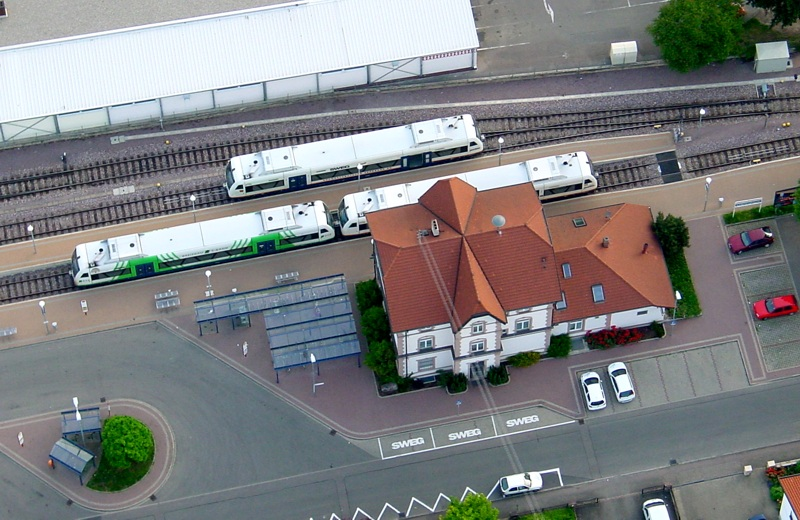
Station of the Kaiserstuhl Railway in Endingen

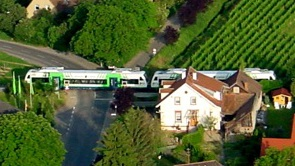
The Kaiserstuhl Railway near Oberrotweil
