= Julius von Bismarck =

German artist

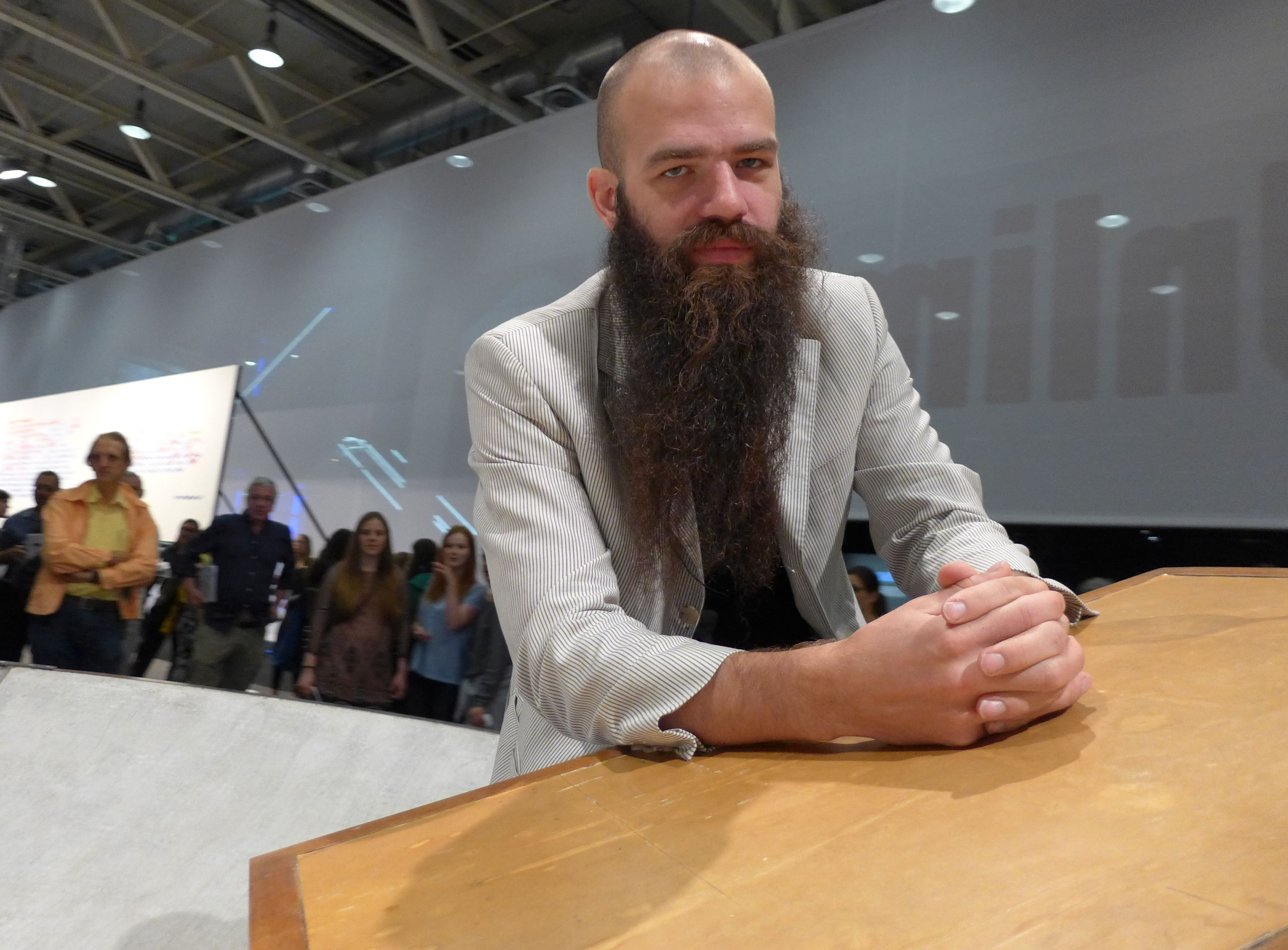
Artist Julius von Bismarck in his revolving disk "Egocentric System" at Art Basel Unlimited 2015

Julius von Bismarck (born 1983, Breisach am Rhein, Germany) is a German artist currently living and working in Berlin, Germany. He attended the Berlin University of the Arts and the Hunter College in New York City.

His project Image Fulgurator was awarded the Prix Ars Electronica and widely acclaimed by a wider audience as well as presented in various media outlets like Wired, Arte and The Creators Project of Vice among others.

Furthermore, Bismarck collaborated with Julian Charrière for the site specific performance “Some pigeons are more equal than others” at the 2012 Venice Biennale for Architecture. This project has also been adapted for performances/instillations in Copenhagen and Berlin. The aforementioned work incorporates a pigeon trapping device designed by Charrière and Bismarck. This equipment is positioned in a public place to capture and subsequently airbrush pigeons as they chart their path within the vicinity. In 2013 he collaborates with swiss choreographer Gilles Jobin for the dance piece QUANTUM, created after an art residency at CERN collide@cern in Geneva Switzerland.
