= Breisgau-S-Bahn GmbH =

- Defunct: 22 December 2017
- Headquarters: Freiburg im Breisgau, Germany
- Total assets: 20 Regio-Shuttle RS1 diesel multiple units
- Owner: Südwestdeutsche Verkehrs-Aktiengesellschaft (SWEG)
- Website: www.breisgau-s-bahn.de

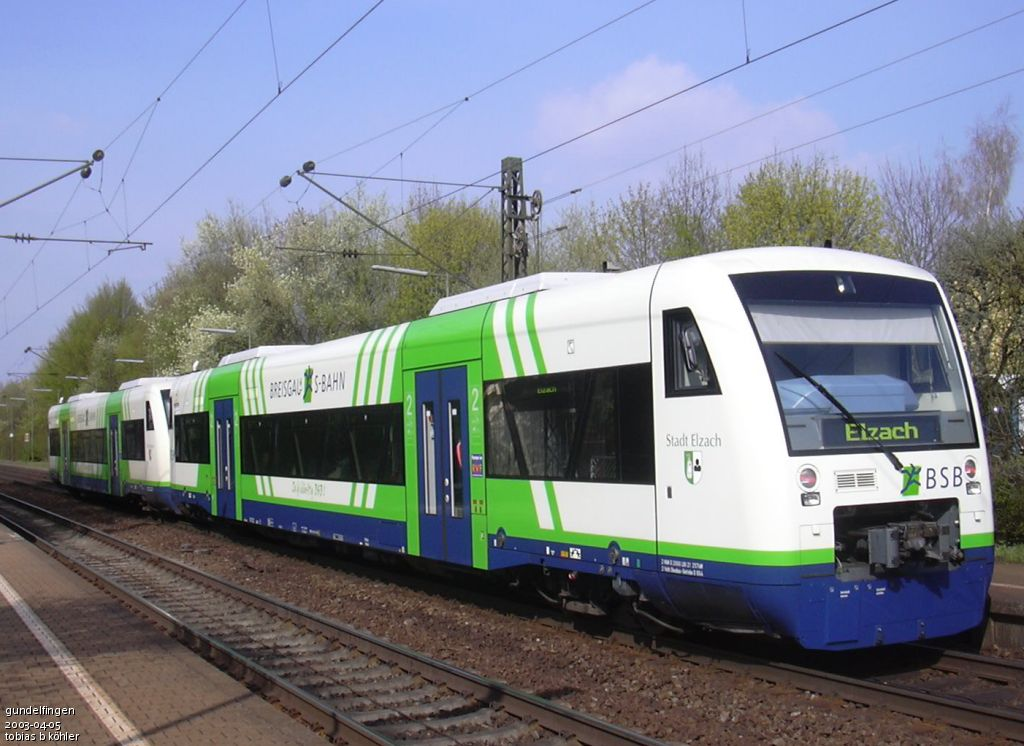
Breisgau S-Bahn train

Breisgau-S-Bahn GmbH (BSB) was a regional railway operator in the German state of Baden-Württemberg. It was a subsidiary of Südwestdeutsche Verkehrs-Aktiengesellschaft (SWEG), a transport company owned by the state of Baden-Württemberg. The company was founded in 1995.

The company operated S-Bahn services over DB Netz AG-owned tracks in the area around Freiburg. The services ran on short sections of the main line Rhine Valley Railway, together with the Elztalbahn and Breisachbahn branch lines.

The company was merged into its parent in December 2017.
