= Breisach =

- Town
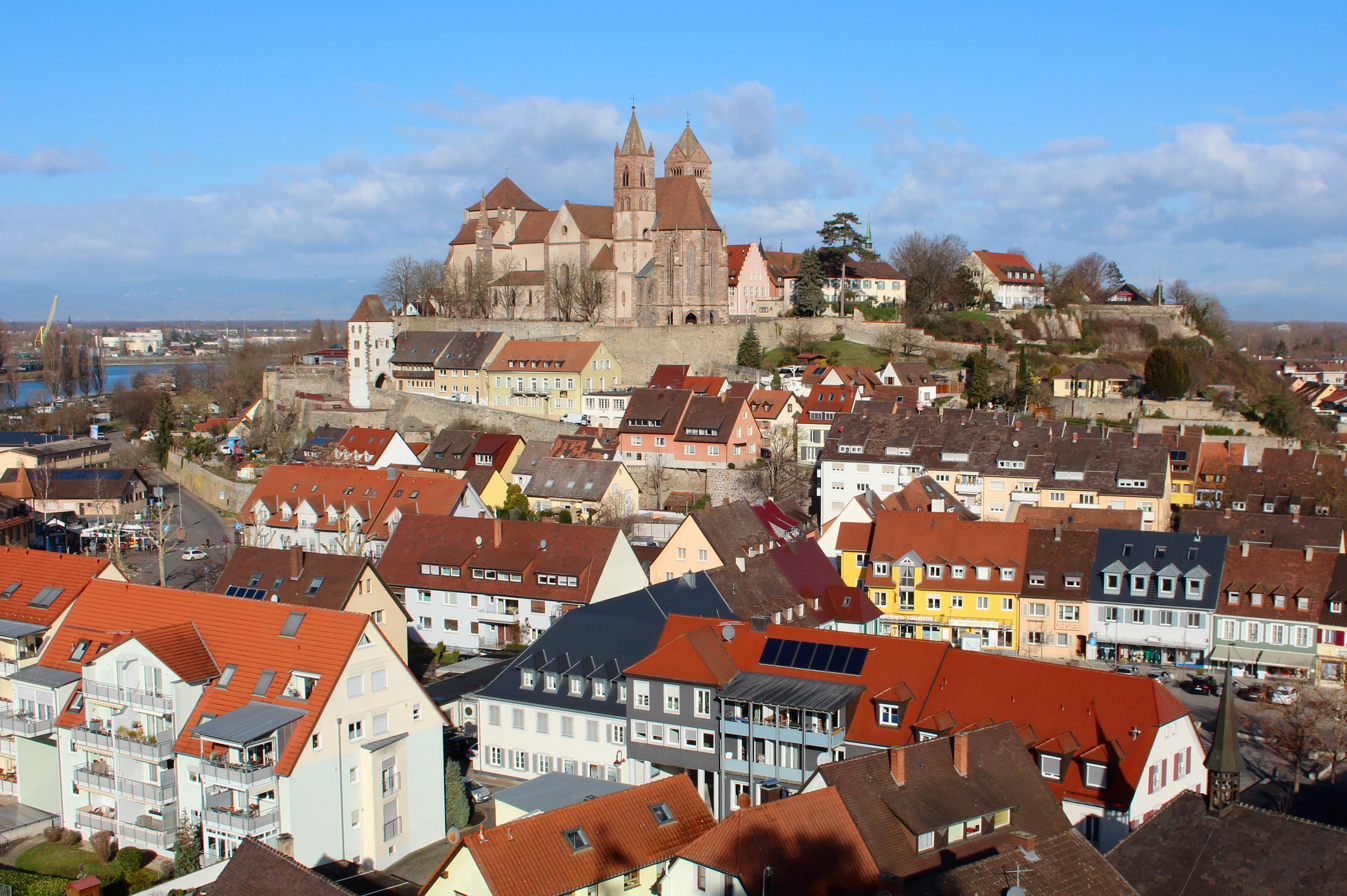
- View of Breisach from above. The French town of Neuf-Brisach is located in the upper left corner.

- Coat of arms

- Location of Breisach within Breisgau-Hochschwarzwald district
- Interactive map of Breisach
- Location within Germany Location within Baden-Württemberg
- Coordinates: 48°2′N 7°35′E
- Country: Germany
- State: Baden-Württemberg
- Admin. region: Freiburg
- District: Breisgau-Hochschwarzwald
- Subdivisions: 12

Government
  - Mayor (2022–30): Oliver Rein (CDU)

Area
  - Total: 54.59 km^{2} (21.08 sq mi)
- Elevation: 225 m (738 ft)

Population (2025-12-31)
  - Total: 16,617
  - Density: 304.4/km^{2} (788.4/sq mi)
- Time zone: UTC+01:00 (CET)
  - Summer (DST): UTC+02:00 (CEST)
- Postal codes: 79206
- Dialling codes: 07667, 07664 (Niederrimsingen, Oberrimsingen), 07668 (Gündlingen)
- Vehicle registration: FR
- Website: www.breisach.de

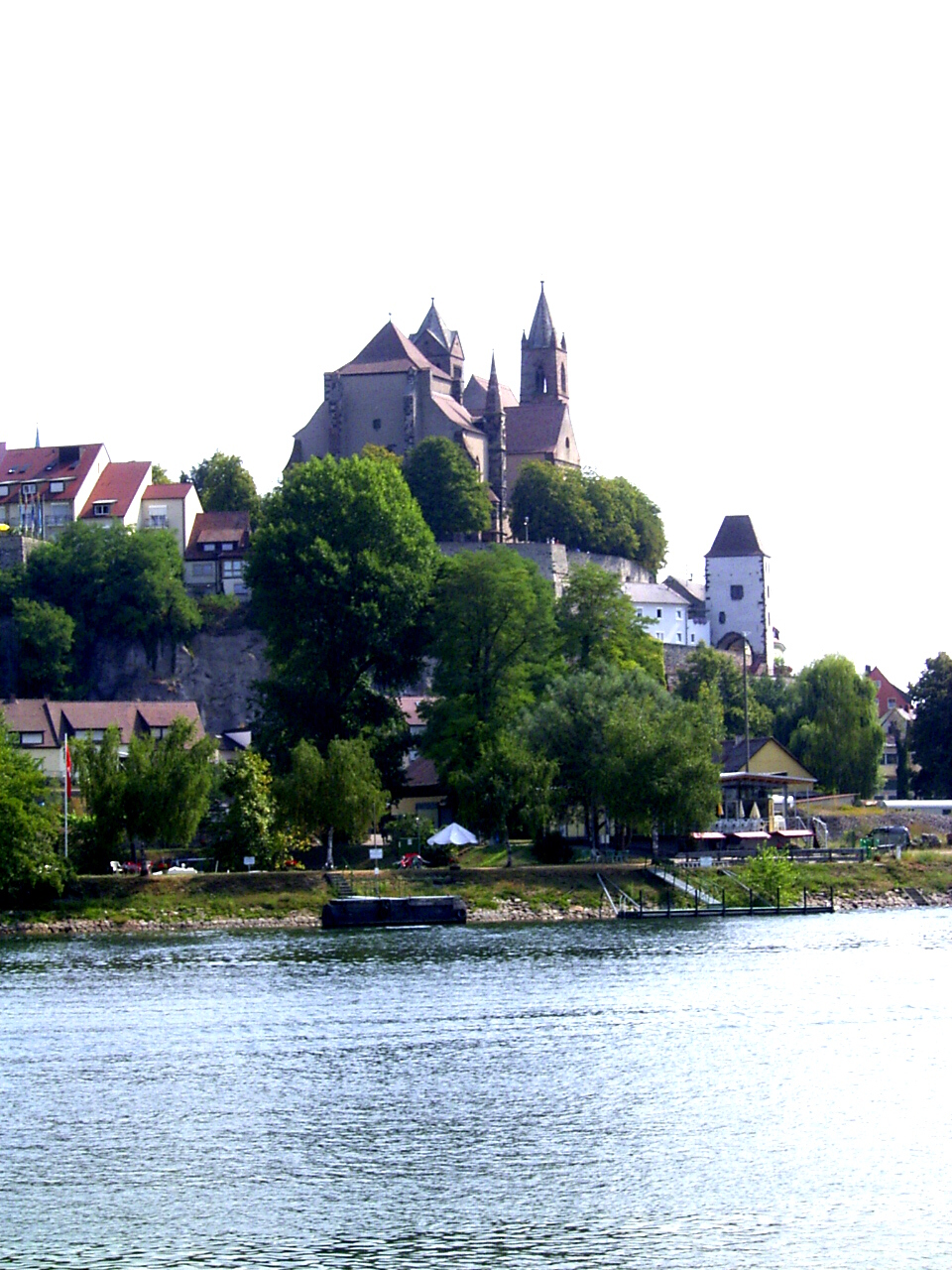
Breisach as seen from the French Rhine shore.

Breisach am Rhein (German pronunciation: [ˈbʁaɪzax ʔam ˈʁaɪn], lit. 'Breisach on the Rhine'; formerly Alt-Breisach, lit. 'Old Breisach', in contrast to "New Breisach"; Low Alemannic: Alt-Brisach), commonly known as Breisach, is a town with approximately 16,500 inhabitants, situated along the Rhine in the Rhine Valley, in the district Breisgau-Hochschwarzwald, Baden-Württemberg, Germany, about halfway between Freiburg and Colmar — 20 kilometres away from each — and about 60 kilometres north of Basel near the Kaiserstuhl. A bridge leads over the Rhine to Neuf-Brisach, Alsace.

Its name is Celtic and means breakwater. The root Breis can also be found in the French word briser meaning to break. The hill on which Breisach came into existence was — at least when there was a flood — in the middle of the Rhine, until the Rhine was straightened by the engineer Johann Gottfried Tulla in the 19th century, thus breaking its surge.

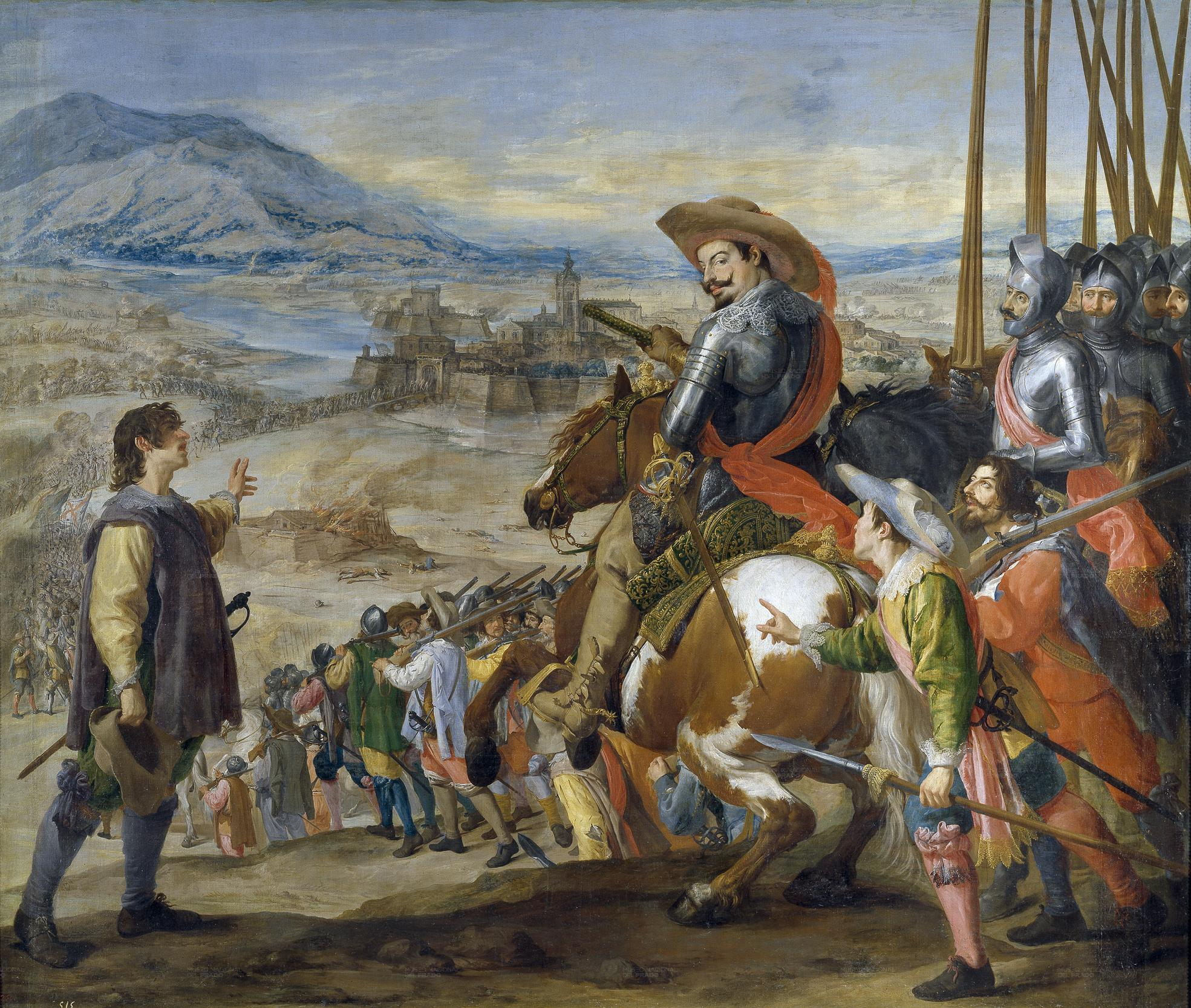
The Spanish relief of Breisach by the Duke of Feria in 1633, during the Thirty Years' War.

== History ==
The seat of a Celtic prince was at the hill on which Breisach is built. The Romans maintained an auxiliary castle on Mons Brisiacus (which came from the Celtic word Brisger, which means waterbreak).

The Staufer dynasty founded Breisach as a city in the modern sense, but there had already been a settlement with a church at the time. An 11th-century coin from Breisach was found in the Sandur hoard.

In the early 13th century, construction on the St. Stephansmünster, Breisach's cathedral, started. In the early 16th century, Breisach was a significant stronghold of the Holy Roman Empire. On December 7, 1638, Bernard of Saxe-Weimar, who was subsidized by France, conquered the city, which Ferdinand II and General Hans Heinrich IX. von Reinach had defended well, and tried to make it the centre of a new territory. After Bernard's death in 1639, his general gave the territory to France, which saw it as its own conquest. In the Peace of Westphalia in 1648, Breisach was de jure given to France.

From 1670, Breisach was integrated into the French state in the course of the "Politique des Réunions" followed by Louis XIV. In the Treaty of Ryswick in 1697, Breisach was returned to the Holy Roman Empire, but then reconquered on September 7, 1703 by Marshal Tallard at the beginning of the War of the Spanish Succession. At the Treaty of Rastatt on March 7, 1714, Breisach became once again part of the Empire. Meanwhile, France founded its own fortress, Neuf-Brisach ("New Breisach"), on the left shore of the Rhine. In 1790, Breisach was part of Further Austria. In the French Revolutionary Wars in 1793, Breisach sustained heavy damage and then, in 1805, was annexed to the Grand Duchy of Baden.

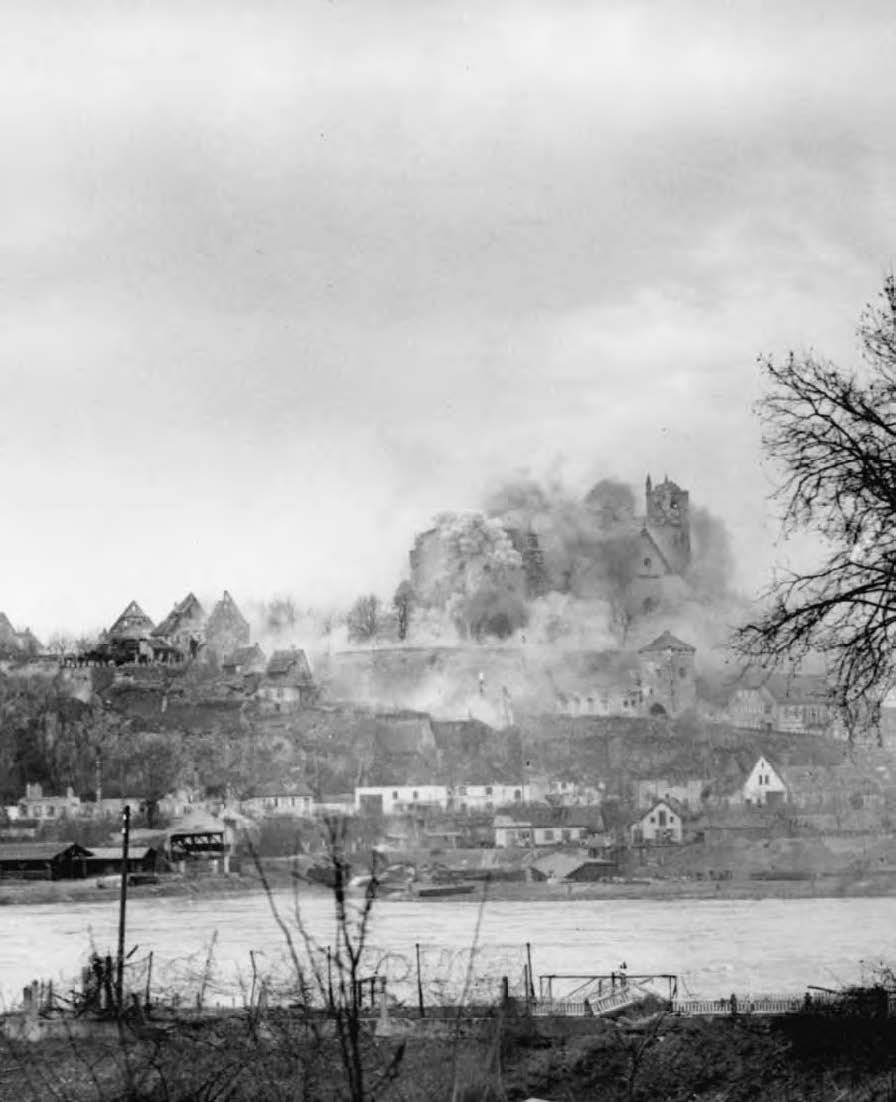
Breisach during heavy artillery shelling.

During World War II, 85% of Breisach was destroyed by Allied artillery as the Allies crossed the Rhine. The St. Stephansmünster was also heavily damaged.

In 1969, Breisach was considered as the construction site for a nuclear power plant, but Wyhl was chosen instead, where the construction project was later abandoned in the face of heavy opposition.

The nearby cities of Hochstetten (1970), Gündlingen (1972), Niederrimsingen (1973), and Oberrimsingen (1975) along with Grezhausen, which had been incorporated into Oberrimsingen in 1936, were all incorporated into Breisach.

== Politics ==
After the municipal elections on June 13, 2004, the seats in the municipal council were distributed as follows:

CDU	43.9%	−3.9	12 seats	±0
SPD	24.3%	−2.1	6 seats	±0
Unaffiliated	16.8%	+3.9	4 Seats	+1
FDP/DVP	15.0%	+2.1	4 seats	+1

== Economy and infrastructure ==
=== Transport ===
Breisach station was, until 1945, the frontier station on the Freiburg–Colmar international railway line. Since the railway bridge across the Rhine was destroyed during the Second World War, railway services have been restricted to the German side of the river. The Breisgau S-Bahn connects Breisach to Freiburg im Breisgau via Gottenheim over the remaining section of the Freiburg–Colmar line, whilst the Kaiserstuhlbahn connects Breisach to Riegel via Vogtsburg and Endingen.

The federal road B 31 leads to Lindau and the N 415 on the French side connects Breisach to Colmar.

=== Local businesses ===
One of Europe's largest wine cellars called Badischer Winzerkeller eG is located in Breisach. Viticulture is very important for the economy of both Breisach and the Kaiserstuhl.

== Main sights ==
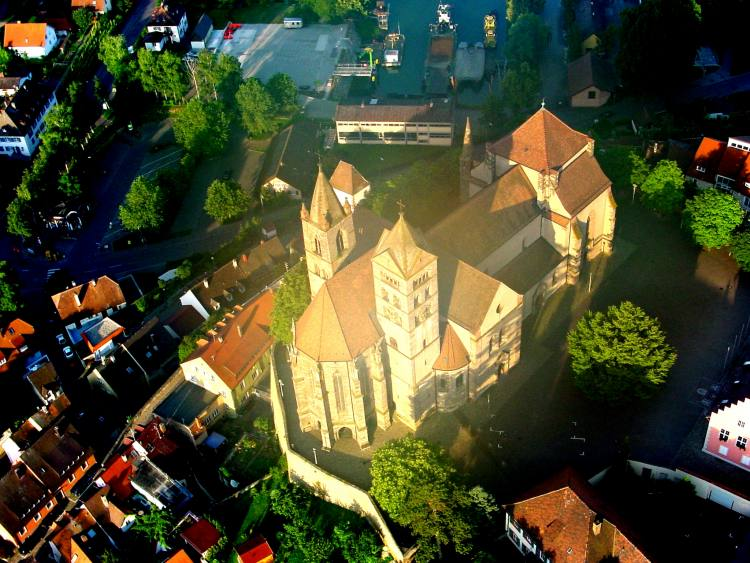
Aerial photo of St. Stephansmünster.

The museum for municipal history has an impressive collection dating from the Stone Age to the present. The Romanesque St. Stephansmünster, the cathedral in Breisach, has a late Gothic altar by an unknown craftsman (with the initials H.L.) and paintings by Martin Schongauer, who is also the eponym of the Gymnasium in the city.

== Jewish history ==
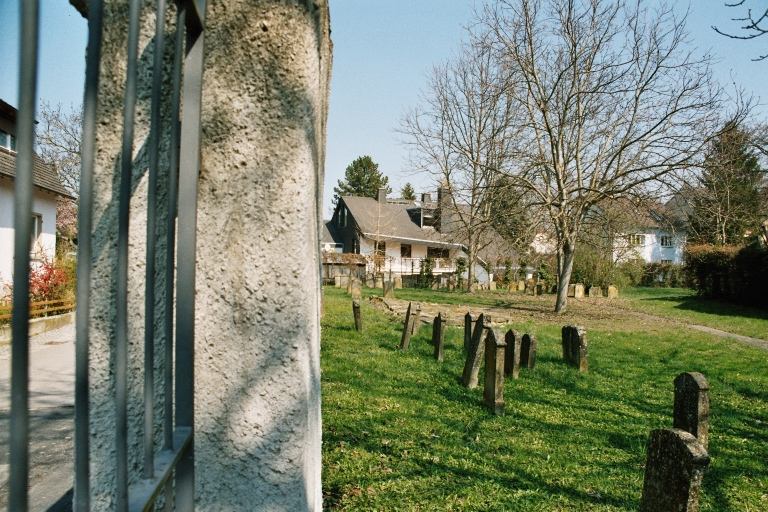
The old Jewish cemetery in Breisach

The first documentation of Jews in town dates to 1301. During the Black Death in 1349, the community was annihilated after a false blood libel, accusing the town Jews of poisoning the town wells. After the pogrom, Jews returned to the town until 1424, when they were expelled once again.

In 1550, the community reopened with a cemetery. In 1750, a Jew owned a textile factory in town, employing about 330 weavers. The Synagogue, built in 1758, was destroyed in November 1938, on Kristallnacht. In 1825, 14% of the town population was Jewish, (438 individuals), though in 1933 this number had declined to 231. On October 22, 1940, the town's last 34 Jews who did not flee to nearby France or other places, were deported to Gurs internment camp, a transit camp in the South of France. In 1967, the town's sole Jewish survivor was a woman who tended the two Jewish cemeteries. A website, dedicated to the town's Jewish history, commemorates the names of Jewish victims during World War II who used to live in town, as also personal stories of survivors and their children. A Jewish survivor who lived in town named Louis Dreyfuss, gave a report on his biography on some cases. The Jewish community of pre-war Breisach maintains a documentary website.

== International relations ==
Breisach is twinned with: Breisach is partnered with the following cities:

- Saint-Louis, France, since 1960
- Pürgg-Trautenfels, Austria, since 1994 partnered with the borough of Niederrimsingen
- Neuf-Brisach, France, since 2000
- Oświęcim, Poland, since 2009
- (Germany) Küstriner Vorland

== Notable people ==
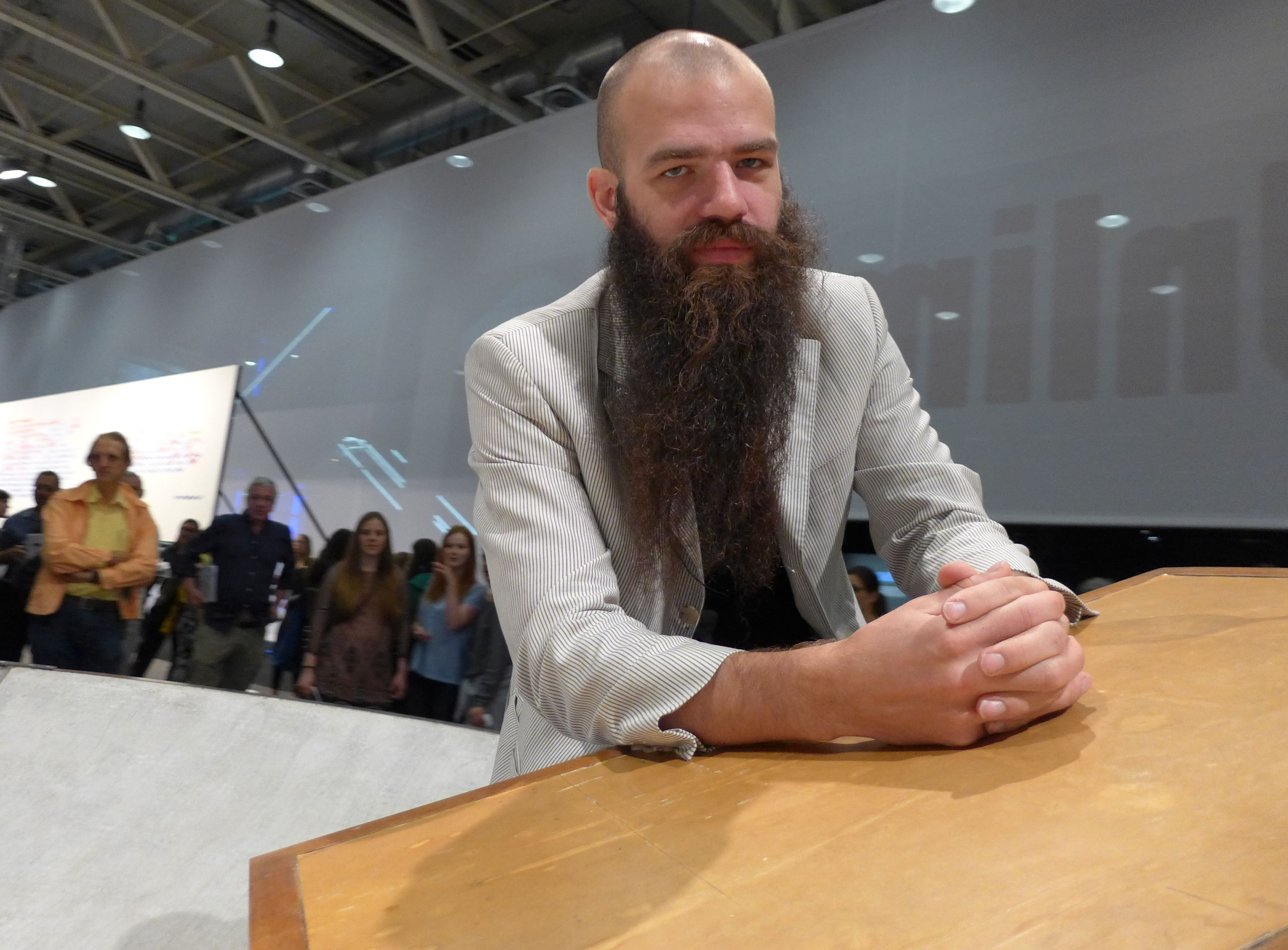
Julius von Bismarck, 2015

- Lehman Kahn (1827–1915), a Belgian Jewish educationist and writer.
- Ernst Adolf Birkenmayer, (DE Wiki) (1842–1916), jurist and member of the German Reichstag, 1881-1884 and 1907-1916.
- Julius von Bismarck (born 1983), a German artist, lives and works in Berlin

=== Sport ===
- Felix Brückmann (born 1990), ice hockey goalkeeper
- Oliver Baumann (born 1990), football goalkeeper for TSG Hoffenheim
- Pascal Krauss (born 1987), mixed martial art fighter, his German nickname means 'tank'

== See also ==
- Peter von Hagenbach
