= SWEG Südwestdeutsche Landesverkehrs =

German transport company

Südwestdeutsche Landesverkehrs-GmbH

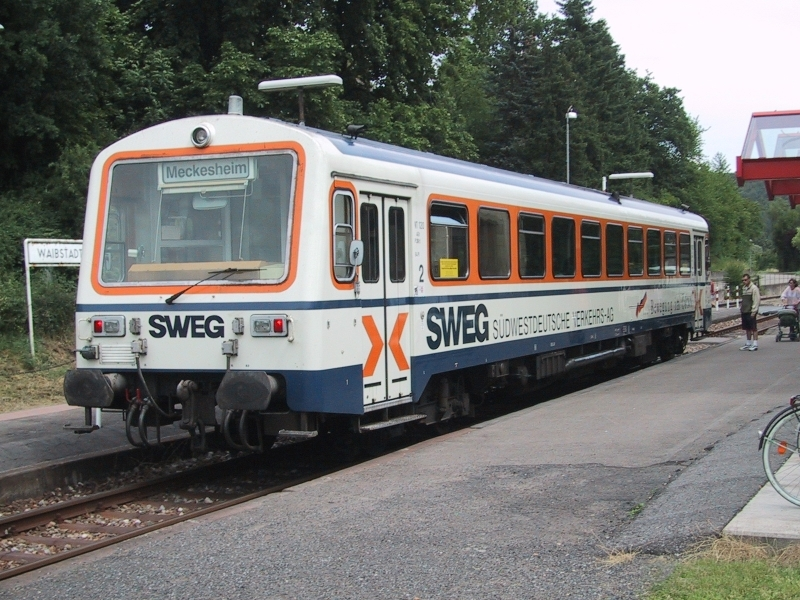
- Historic train of the SWEG
- Industry: Transportation
- Founded: 1963
- Headquarters: Rheinstraße 8, Lahr, Germany
- Area served: Baden-Württemberg
- Key people: Tobias Harms (CEO), Thilo Grabo
- Services: Rail and bus services
- Owner: State of Baden-Württemberg
- Number of employees: 1800
- Website: www.sweg.de

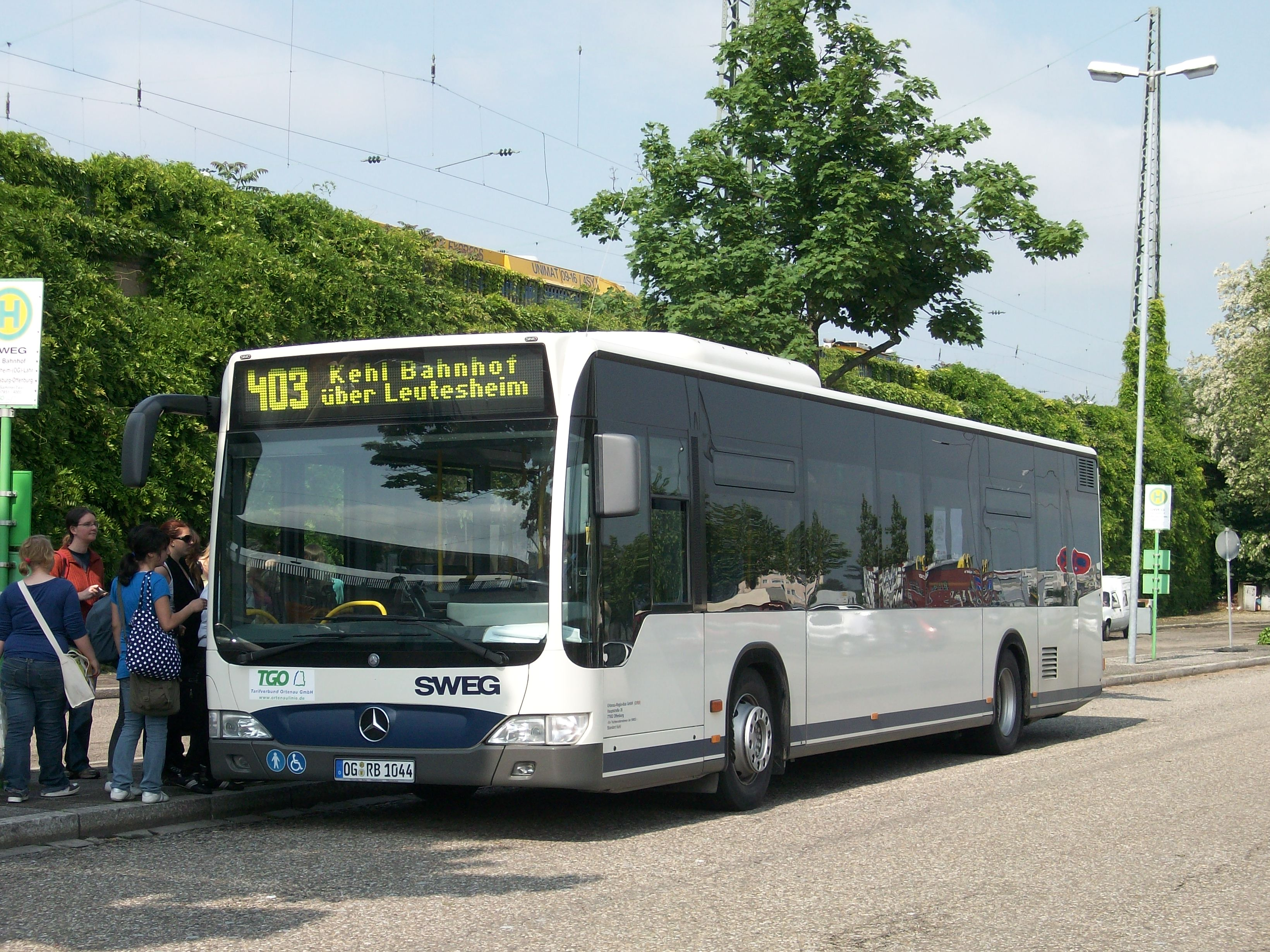
Mercedes-Benz Citaro in Kehl in May 2009

The Südwestdeutsche Landesverkehrs-GmbH (SWEG), in English language Southwest German Transport Company, from its former name, Südwestdeutsche Eisenbahn-Gesellschaft (SEG), is a transport company in southwest Germany that operates railway lines and bus services. It is 100% owned by the federal state of Baden-Württemberg.

On 24 July 2017, a merger between SWEG and the Hohenzollerische Landesbahn (HzL) was approved by the Sigmaringen and Zollernalbkreis district authorities which each hold 14% stakes in HzL. The merger has already been approved by the state of Baden-Württemberg, which besides its ownership of SWEG also owns 72% of HzL. The merger took effect from the beginning of 2018.

== Railway services ==
SWEG directly owns and operates the following railway lines:

- Achern – Ottenhöfen (the Achertalbahn)
- Bad Krozingen – Münstertal (the Münstertalbahn)
- Biberach (Baden) – Oberharmersbach-Riersbach (the Harmersbachtalbahn)
- Bühl – Schwarzach – Stollhofen (goods only)
- Gottenheim – Riegel am Kaiserstuhl – Breisach (the Kaiserstuhlbahn)
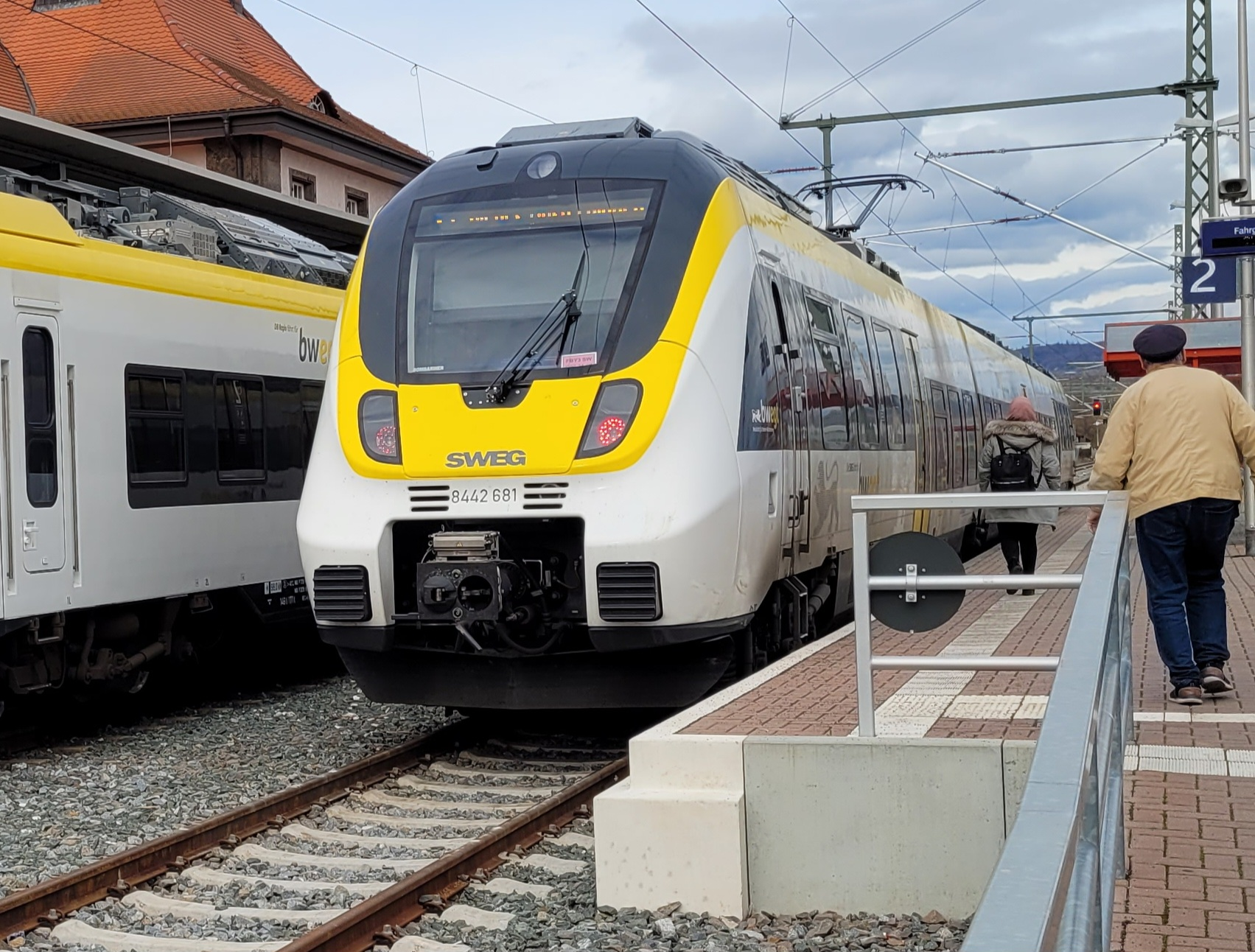
  SWEG Bombardier Talent 3 train at Breisach railway station (March, 2023)
- Freiburg (Breisgau) Hbf – Denzlingen – Elzach (the Elztalbahn)

SWEG's wholly owned Ortenau S-Bahn subsidiary also operates services over lines owned by DB Netz AG in the vicinity of Offenburg. SWEG also has a 50% share-holding in the Breisgau S-Bahn, which operates similar services in the vicinity of Freiburg im Breisgau.
