= Breisgau S-Bahn =

S-Bahn network in Germany

Overview
- Locale: Breisgau
- Number of lines: 6

Operation
- Began operation: 2020
- Operators: DB Regio Baden-Württemberg; SWEG
System map

The Breisgau S-Bahn, branded as Breisgau-S-Bahn 2020, is an S-Bahn network centered on Freiburg im Breisgau in Baden-Württemberg, Germany.

== Lines ==
The network comprises six lines, three operated by DB Regio Baden-Württemberg and three by SWEG Südwestdeutsche Landesverkehrs-AG (SWEG):

Line	Route	Operator
S1	Breisach–Freiburg Hauptbahnhof–Seebrugg	DB Regio Baden-Württemberg
S10	Freiburg Hauptbahnhof–Villingen (Schwarzwald)	DB Regio Baden-Württemberg
S11	Endingen am Kaiserstuhl–Freiburg Hauptbahnhof–Neustadt (Schwarzw)	DB Regio Baden-Württemberg
S2	Freiburg Hauptbahnhof–Elzach	SWEG
S3	Bad Krozingen–Münstertal	SWEG
S5	Breisach–Riegel-Malterdingen	SWEG
