= Riegel am Kaiserstuhl =

Riegel
- Municipality
- Coat of arms

- Location of Riegel within Emmendingen district
- Interactive map of Riegel
- Location within Germany Location within Baden-Württemberg
- Coordinates: 48°9′2″N 7°45′0″E
- Country: Germany
- State: Baden-Württemberg
- Admin. region: Freiburg
- District: Emmendingen

Government
  - Mayor (2018–26): Daniel Kietz

Area
  - Total: 18.33 km^{2} (7.08 sq mi)
- Elevation: 195 m (640 ft)

Population (2025-12-31)
  - Total: 3,982
  - Density: 217.2/km^{2} (562.6/sq mi)
- Time zone: UTC+01:00 (CET)
  - Summer (DST): UTC+02:00 (CEST)
- Postal codes: 79359
- Dialling codes: 07642
- Vehicle registration: EM
- Website: www.gemeinde-riegel.de

Riegel am Kaiserstuhl (German pronunciation: [ˈʁiːɡl̩ ʔam ˈkaɪzɐʃtuːl], lit. 'Riegel on the Kaiserstuhl') is a municipality in the district of Emmendingen in Baden-Württemberg, Germany. It lies 8 km northwest of Emmendingen, and is accessed by the motorway A5 (Karlsruhe - Basel).

== Education ==
Riegel provides its citizens education with the Michaelschule that consists of both a Grund- and a Hauptschule.

== Roman ruins ==
A Mithraeum was unearthed in the residential neighborhoods of Riegel. A reconstruction of the temple was placed there, and the original artifacts can be seen at the museum in Freiburg im Breisgau.

== Municipal partnership ==
- Champhol, Eure-et-Loir, France, since 1995

== Museum ==
The Kunsthalle Messmer is a museum exhibiting art from the 20th and 21st century. It is located in a former brewery building and includes a sculpture garden. The museum of the municipality exhibits excavations of the Roman village and reconstructed models. Furtheron there is a part on the development of jet-propulsion of rockets with objects pictures, films and text
