= Bad Bellingen station =

Railway station in Germany

Bad Bellingen
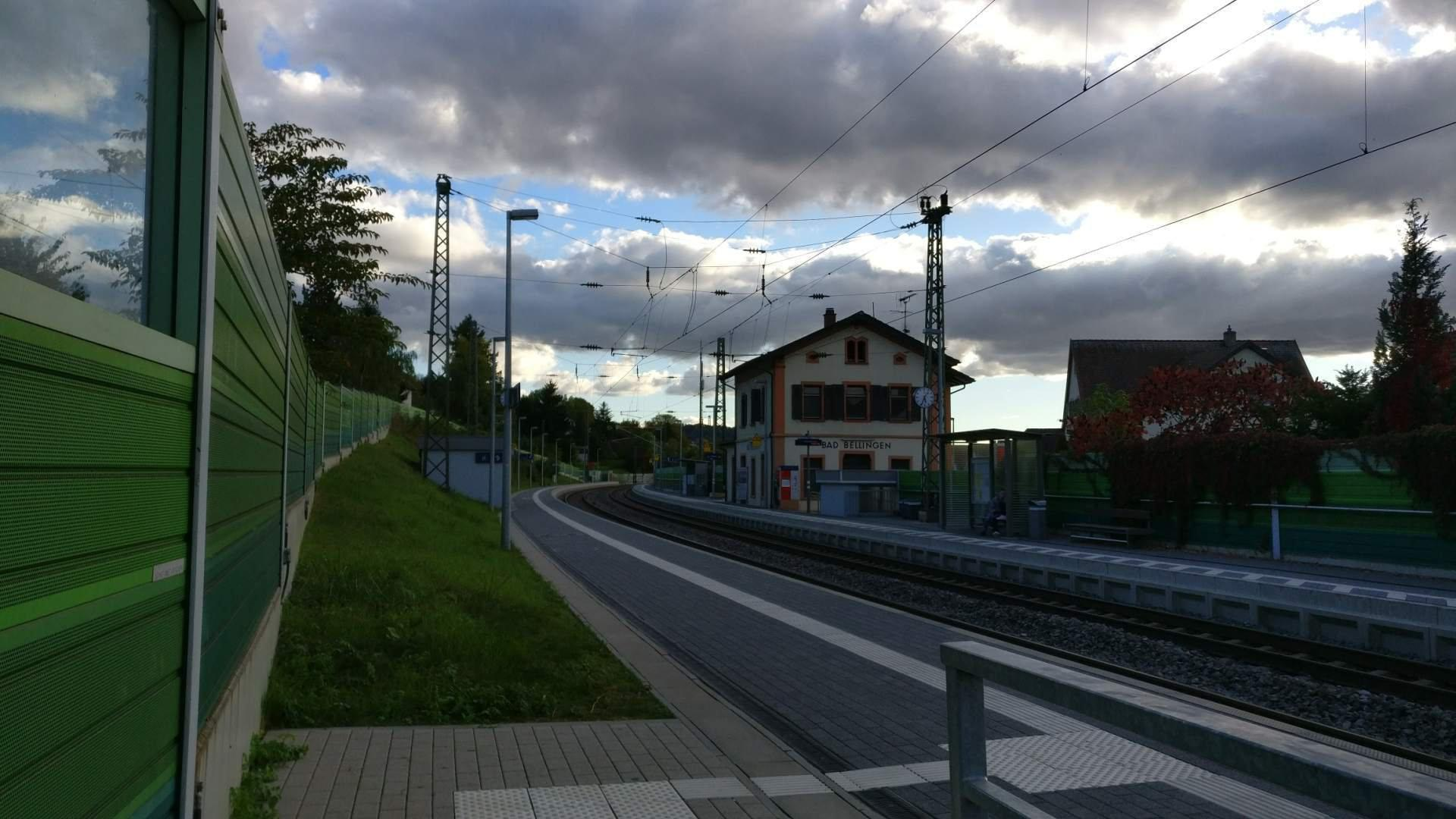
- Station in 2017

General information
- Location: Bahnhofstr. 20, Bad Bellingen, Baden-Württemberg; Germany
- Coordinates: 47°43′51″N 7°33′27″E
- Elevation: 254 m (833 ft)
- Lines: Mannheim–Karlsruhe–Basel railway (km 246.8) (KBS 703)
- Platforms: 2

Construction
- Accessible: Yes

Other information
- Station code: 247
- DS100 code: RBEL
- IBNR: 8000864
- Category: 6
- Fare zone: RVL: 4; RVF: RVL (RVL transitional tariff, stripe tickets only)
- Website: www.bahnhof.de

History
- Opened: 30 July 1845

Services
| Preceding station | DB Regio Baden-Württemberg | Following station |
|---|---|---|
| Schliengen towards Karlsruhe Hbf | RE 7 | Efringen-Kirchen towards Basel Bad Bf |
| Schliengen towards Emmendingen | RB 27 | Rheinweiler towards Basel Bad Bf |
Location

Bad Bellingen station is, along with Rheinweiler station, one of two stations in the municipality of Bad Bellingen in Baden-Württemberg, Germany. It lies on the Mannheim–Karlsruhe–Basel railway (Rhine Valley Railway). It has two platform tracks and DB designates it as a class 6 station.

== Location ==
Bad Bellingen station is very centrally located in the municipality of Bad Bellingen. All important facilities and sights in the town can be reached quickly from it. The Gasthof Hirschen restaurant is located directly opposite the station on the west side, near a small P+R parking area and covered parking facilities for bicycles and motorbikes.

Bad Bellingen is located in Regio Verkehrsverbund Lörrach (Lörrach Regional Transport Association, RVL), which administers local services and fares. Toward the south (Basel) is the border of the Tarifverbund Nordwestschweiz (Northwest Switzerland Fare Association, TNW).

== History ==
Bad Bellingen station was opened on 8 November 1848 as part of the Schliengen–Efringen section of the Mannheim–Karlsruhe–Basel railway (Rhine Valley Railway) from Mannheim via Karlsruhe and Freiburg to Basel. The ticket office was opened at the same time.

The entrance building, which is still standing today, was opened In 1865, almost 20 years after the opening of the line.

A freight hall with a loading platform was added to the entrance building in 1884. The loading of freight in Bad Bellingen was abandoned in 1965 and the freight hall was demolished in 1978.

The ticket office, the baggage claim area and the waiting room in the station building were closed on 1 September 1991. The station building has been empty since then.

The platforms have been raised slightly and extended to a length of 210 metres, with work finished in December 2013.

In the summer of 2014, the section of line between Schliengen and Haltingen via Bad Bellingen was completely renovated with full closure. The tracks, sleepers and tunnels were renewed.

The station building was auctioned on behalf of Deutsche Bahn by Auktionshaus Karhausen AG in Berlin on 9 October 2015.

== Service ==
=== Rail ===
The city is connected to Basel and Freiburg and Offenburg by Regional-Express and Regionalbahn services. Both services run every hour, with additional connections during peak hours.

The closest Intercity Express stops are to the south at Basel Bad Bf and to the north at Freiburg (Breisgau) Hbf. The next stop for individual IC and TGV services is Müllheim (Baden).

| Line | Route | Frequency |
|---|---|---|
| RE 7 | (Emmendingen – Denzlingen –) Freiburg (Breisgau) – Schallstadt – Bad Krozingen – Müllheim (Baden) – Bad Bellingen – Weil am Rhein – Basel Bad Bf (– Basel SBB) | 2 Hourly |
| RB 27 | (Karlsruhe –) Offenburg – Lahr (Schwarzw) – Emmendingen – Freiburg (Breisgau) – Ebringen – Schallstadt – Bad Krozingen – Heitersheim – Müllheim (Baden) – Neuenburg (Baden) / Bad Bellingen – Weil am Rhein – Basel Bad Bf | Hourly (some gaps in the morning) |

=== Bus ===
The Hertinger Straße bus stop is on the east side of Bad Bellingen station. Interurban bus routes 4 and 15 of Stadtverkehrs Lörrach, which are operated by Südwestdeutsche Verkehrs-Aktiengesellschaft (SWEG). These connect Bad Bellingen with Schliengen and Kandern (route 4) and Blansingen, Efringen-Kirchen and Binzen (route 15).
