= List of regional railway routes in Baden-Württemberg =

The List of railway routes in Baden-Württemberg provides a list of all railway routes in Baden-Württemberg, Germany. This includes Intercity-Express, Intercity, Interregio-Express, Regional-Express, Metropolexpress, Regionalbahn and S-Bahn services. The information is up to date to February 2021.

== Regional-Express and Regionalbahn lines ==
The following Regional-Express (RE), Metropolexpress (MEX) and Regionalbahn (RB) services run through Baden-Württemberg:

Line	KBS	Route		Frequency	Operator
RE 1	770	Karlsruhe Hauptbahnhof – Karlsruhe-Durlach – Wilferdingen-Singen – Pforzheim Hauptbahnhof – Mühlacker – Vaihingen (Enz) – Stuttgart Hauptbahnhof – Schorndorf – Schwäbisch Gmünd – Aalen Hauptbahnhof		60 min (Karlsruhe – Stuttgart); 120 min (Karlsruhe – Aalen)	Arverio Baden-Württemberg
RE1	4322	Konstanz – Romanshorn – Herisau		60 min	Thurbo
RE 2	702, 720	Karlsruhe Hbf – Rastatt – Baden-Baden – Achern – Offenburg – Hausach – Villingen (Schwarzwald) – Donaueschingen – Immendingen – Singen (Hohentwiel) – Radolfzell – Konstanz		60 min	DB Regio Baden-Württemberg
RE 3	730, 731	Basel Bad Bf – Rheinfelden (Baden) – Bad Säckingen – Waldshut – Tiengen (Hochrhein) – Erzingen (Baden) – Schaffhausen – Singen (Hohentwiel) – Radolfzell – Überlingen – Friedrichshafen Hafen		60 min (Basel – Singen); 120 min (Singen – Friedrichshafen Hafen)	DB Regio Baden-Württemberg
RE 3	751	Lindau-Reutin – Kressbronn – Friedrichshafen Stadt – Ravensburg – Biberach (Riß) – Ulm Hauptbahnhof		60 min	DB Regio Baden-Württemberg
RE 4	740	Stuttgart Hbf – Böblingen – Herrenberg – Horb – Rottweil – Tuttlingen – Singen (Hohentwiel) (– Konstanz) (Note: IC 87 accepts local tickets, operating as RE 87, between Singen and Stuttgart Hbf)		3 train pairs (Sun)	DB Regio Baden-Württemberg
RE 87 / IC 87	740	Stuttgart Hbf – Böblingen – Herrenberg – Horb – Rottweil – Tuttlingen – Singen (Hohentwiel) (– Konstanz)		60 min (Stuttgart – Singen) 2 train pairs (Singen – Konstanz; Mon–Fri); 1 train pair (Singen – Konstanz; Sat, Sun)	DB Fernverkehr
RE 4	660	Karlsruhe – Ludwigshafen – Frankenthal – Worms – Mainz Hbf – Frankfurt		120 min	DB Regio Mitte
RE 5	750, 751	Stuttgart Hbf – Plochingen – Göppingen – Geislingen (Steige) – Ulm Hauptbahnhof – Laupheim West – Biberach (Riß) – Aulendorf – Ravensburg – Friedrichshafen Stadt		60 min (Stuttgart – Friedrichshafen)	DB Regio Baden-Württemberg
RE 6	760	Stuttgart Hbf – Metzingen (Württ) – Reutlingen Hbf – Tübingen Hbf		120 min	SWEG Bahn Stuttgart
RE 6a	760, 766	Stuttgart Hbf – Reutlingen Hbf – Tübingen Hbf (train split)	– Hechingen – Balingen (Württ.) – Albstadt-Ebingen – Sigmaringen – Herbertingen – Aulendorf	120 min	DB Regio Baden-Württemberg
RE 6b	760, 766	Stuttgart Hbf – Reutlingen Hbf – Tübingen Hbf (train split)	Rottenburg – Horb	120 min	DB Regio Baden-Württemberg
RE 6	676	Kaiserslautern – Neustadt – Landau – Winden – Wörth – Karlsruhe		60 min	DB Regio Baden-Württemberg
RE 7	702	Karlsruhe Hbf – Rastatt – Baden-Baden – Achern – Offenburg – Lahr (Schwarzw) – Riegel-Malterdingen – Emmendingen – Freiburg (Breisgau) Hbf – Bad Krozingen – Müllheim (Baden) – Weil am Rhein –Basel Bad (– Basel SBB)		60 min (Karlsruhe – Offenburg; in peak); 60 min (Offenburg – Basel Bad Bf); 5 train pairs (Basel Bad Bf – Basel SBB; Mon–Fri)	DB Regio Baden-Württemberg
RE 8	780	Stuttgart Hbf – Bietigheim-Bissingen – Heilbronn – Bad Friedrichshall – Osterburken – Lauda – Würzburg		60 min	Arverio Baden-Württemberg
RE 9	980	Ulm – Dinkelscherben – Augsburg – München		60 min	Arverio Bayern
RE 10a	655.1-2, 710.41, 780	Heilbronn Hbf – Bad Friedrichshall Hbf – Mosbach-Neckarelz – Neckargemünd – Heidelberg – Mannheim		120 min	SWEG Bahn Stuttgart
RE 10b	655.5, 710.42, 780	Heilbronn Hbf – Bad Friedrichshall Hbf – Sinsheim (Elsenz) – Meckesheim – Neckargemünd – Heidelberg – Mannheim		120 min	SWEG Bahn Stuttgart
RE 14	670	Mannheim – Ludwigshafen (Rhein) Mitte – Mainz (– Frankfurt (Main))		120 min	DB Regio Mitte
RE 14a	740	Stuttgart Hbf – Böblingen – Herrenberg – Eutingen im Gäu (train split)	– Horb – Rottweil	120 min	DB Regio Baden-Württemberg
RE 14b	740, 741	Stuttgart Hbf – Böblingen – Herrenberg – Eutingen im Gäu (train split)	– Hochdorf (b. Horb) – Freudenstadt	120 min	DB Regio Baden-Württemberg
RE 35 / IC 35	720	Singen (Hohentwiel) – Radolfzell (Note: IC 2004, IC 2005, IC 2006 and IC 2009 accept local transport tickets on the route)		2 train pairs	DB Fernverkehr
RE 40	702, 710.8	Karlsruhe Hbf – Rastatt – Forbach – Freudenstadt Hbf		120 min	DB Regio Mitte
RE 45	710.4	Karlsruhe Hbf – Bretten – Flehingen – Eppingen – Schwaigern West – Heilbronn Hbf		60 min	DB Regio Mitte
RE 50	757	Ulm Hbf – Langenau (Württ) – Giengen (Brenz) – Heidenheim – Oberkochen – Aalen Hbf		1 train pair	DB Regio Baden-Württemberg
RE 55	743, 755	(Villingen (Schwarzwald) –) Donaueschingen – Immendingen – Tuttlingen – Sigmaringen – Herbertingen – Schelklingen – Ulm Hbf		60 min (Donaueschingen – Ulm); 3 train pairs (Villingen – Donaueschingen)	DB Regio Baden-Württemberg
RE 60	650	Frankfurt Hbf – Darmstadt Hbf – Bensheim – Heppenheim – Weinheim – Mannheim Hbf		60 min	DB Regio Mitte
RE 70	655	Mannheim – Biblis – Gernsheim – Frankfurt Hbf		60 min	DB Regio Mitte
RE 71	701, 770	Heidelberg – Wiesloch-Walldorf – Bruchsal – Bretten – Mühlacker		120 min	SWEG Bahn Stuttgart
RE 73	701	Karlsruhe Hbf – Bruchsal – Heidelberg Hbf – Mannheim Hbf		60 min	DB Regio Mitte
RE 75	975	Ulm – Senden – Memmingen – Kempten – Immenstadt – Oberstdorf		60 min	DB Regio Bayern
RE 80	710.4, 783, 785	Heilbronn Hbf – Öhringen – Schwäbisch Hall-Hessental – Crailsheim		120 min	Westfrankenbahn
RE 87	781, 782	Crailsheim – Bad Mergentheim – Lauda – Tauberbischofsheim – Wertheim – Miltenberg – Aschaffenburg		60 min	Westfrankenbahn
RE 89	989	Aalen – Nördlingen – Donauwörth		120 min	Arverio Bayern
RE 90	785	Stuttgart Hbf – Waiblingen – Backnang – Schwäbisch Hall-Hessental – Crailsheim – Dombühl – Ansbach – Nuremberg		120 min	Arverio Baden-Württemberg
RE 96	753, 970	Munich – Buchloe – Memmingen – Leutkirch – Kißlegg – Wangen (Allgäu) – Hergatz – Lindau-Insel – Lindau-Reutin		120 min	Arverio Bayern
RE 200	750.1	Wendlingen (Neckar) – Merklingen – Ulm Hbf		60 min	DB Regio Baden-Württemberg
MEX 12	760, 780	Tübingen Hbf – Reutlingen Hbf – Metzinge – Nürtingen – Plochingen – Stuttgart Hbf – Bietigheim-Bissingen – Heilbronn Hbf (– Mosbach-Neckarelz)		60 min (Tübingen – Heilbronn); 3 train pairs (Heilbronn – Mosbach)	SWEG Bahn Stuttgart
MEX 13	786	Stuttgart Hbf – Waiblingen – Schorndorf – Schwäbisch Gmünd – Aalen Hbf – Ellwangen – Crailsheim		30 min (Stuttgart – Aalen); 60 min (Aalen – Ellwangen); 120 min (Ellwangen – Crailshaim)	Arverio Baden-Württemberg
MEX 16	750	Stuttgart Hbf – Plochingen – Göppingen – Geislingen (Steige) – Amstetten – Ulm Hbf		30 min (Stuttgart – Geislingen); 60 min (Geislingen – Ulm)	Arverio Baden-Württemberg
MEX 17a	770	Stuttgart Hbf – Bietigheim-Bissingen – Vaihingen (Enz) – Mühlacker – Pforzheim Hbf	(– Wilferdingen-Singen – Karlsruhe)	30 min (Bietigheim-Bissingen – Pforzheim); 60 min (Stuttgart – Bietigheim-Bissingen); 5 train pairs (Pforzheim – Karlsruhe); 4 train pairs (Pforzheim – Bad Wildbad)	SWEG Bahn Stuttgart
MEX 17a	770	Stuttgart Hbf – Bietigheim-Bissingen – Vaihingen (Enz) – Mühlacker – Pforzheim Hbf	(– Bad Wildbad)	30 min (Bietigheim-Bissingen – Pforzheim); 60 min (Stuttgart – Bietigheim-Bissingen); 5 train pairs (Pforzheim – Karlsruhe); 4 train pairs (Pforzheim – Bad Wildbad)	SWEG Bahn Stuttgart
MEX 17c	770	Stuttgart Hbf – Ludwigsburg – Bietigheim-Bissingen – Mühlacker – Maulbronn West – Bretten – Bruchsal		60 min	SWEG Bahn Stuttgart
MEX 18	760, 780	Tübingen Hbf – Reutlingen Hbf – Metzingen (Württ) – Bempflingen – Nürtingen – Oberboihingen – Wendlingen (Neckar) – Plochingen – Esslingen (Neckar) – Stuttgart Hbf – Ludwigsburg – Bietigheim-Bissingen – Heilbronn Hbf – Neckarsulm – Bad Friedrichshall Hbf – Möckmühl – Osterburken		60 min	SWEG Bahn Stuttgart
MEX 19	785	Stuttgart Hbf – Waiblingen – Backnang – Gaildorf West		60 min (not in the evening)	DB Regio Baden-Württemberg
MEX 90	785	Stuttgart Hbf – Waiblingen – Backnang – Gaildorf West – Schwäbisch Hall-Hessental – Crailsheim		120 min (Stuttgart – Hessental; not in the evening); 60 min (Stuttgart – Hessental; evening); 4 train pairs (Hessental – Crailsheim)	DB Regio Baden-Württemberg
RB 11	790.11	Stuttgart-Untertürkheim – Kornwestheim		6 train pairs (Mon–Fri)	DB Regio Baden-Württemberg
RB 15	980	Ulm Hbf – Günzburg – Donauwörth – Ingolstadt		60 min	Agilis
RB 17c	770	Mühlacker – Maulbronn West – Bretten – Bruchsal		Morning and evening services	SWEG Bahn Stuttgart
RB 26	702	Freiburg (Breisgau) Hbf – Emmendingen – Riegel-Malterdingen – Lahr – Offenburg		60 min (Freiburg – Offenburg)	DB Regio Baden-Württemberg
RB 27	702	(Emmendingen – Denzlingen –) Freiburg (Breisgau) Hbf – Bad Krozingen – Müllheim im Markgräflerland – Weil am Rhein – Basel Bad Bf		60 min (Freiburg – Basel); 4 train pairs (Offenburg – Freiburg)	DB Regio Baden-Württemberg
RB 27	702	Müllheim im Markgräflerland – Neuenburg (Baden)		60 min	DB Regio Baden-Württemberg
RB 28	703	(Freiburg (Breisgau) Hbf –) Müllheim im Markgräflerland – Neuenburg (Baden) – Bantzenheim (F) – Mulhouse (F)		120 min (Müllheim – Mulhouse); 1 train pair (Freiburg – Müllheim)	DB Regio Baden-Württemberg
RB 31	731	Singen (Hohentwiel) – Radolfzell – Überlingen – Markdorf (Baden) – Friedrichshafen Stadt – Friedrichshafen Hafen/Kressbronn		60 min (Radolfzell – Friedrichshafen); 1 train pair (Singen – Radolfzell)	SWEG / DB Regio Baden-Württemberg
RB 32a	732	Stockach – Meßkirch – Mengen		3 train pairs (Sun, May–October)	DB Regio Baden-Württemberg
RB 37	743	Waldshut – Wutöschingen – Eggingen – Stühlingen (– Weizen)		120 min (Waldshut – Stühlingen); 2 train pairs (Stühlingen – Weizen)	DB Regio Baden-Württemberg
RB 41	702, 710.8	Karlsruhe Hbf – Rastatt – Gaggenau – Gernsbach – Weisenbach – Forbach (Schwarzwald) (– Baiersbronn – Freudenstadt Stadt – Freudenstadt Hbf)		60 min (Karlsruhe – Forbach); 3 train pairs (Forbach – Freudenstadt)	DB Regio Mitte
RB 42	742	Bräunlingen – Donaueschingen – Villingen (Schwarzw) – Schwenningen (Neckar) – Trossingen Bf – Rottweil		60 min	SWEG
RB 42a	742.1	Trossingen Bf – Trossingen Stadt		30 min (peak); 60 min	SWEG
RB 43	743	Rottweil – Spaichingen – Tuttlingen – Immendingen – Geisingen-Leipferdingen – Blumberg-Zollhaus		60 min (Rottweil – Leipferdingen); 4 train pairs (Leipferdingen – Zollhaus)	SWEG
RB 43a	743	Immendingen – Tuttlingen – Fridingen (b. Tuttlingen) – Sigmaringen		Sime trains	SWEG
RB 44	702	Karlsruhe Hbf – Rastatt – Baden-Baden – Bühl – Achern		60 min (Karlsruhe – Rastatt); 7 train pairs (Rastatt – Baden-Baden); 4 train pairs (Baden-Baden – Bühl); 1 train pair (Bühl – Achern)	DB Regio Mitte
RB 46	790.72	Böblingen – Holzgerlingen – Dettenhausen		15 min (Böblingen – Holzgerlingen); 30 min (Holzgerlingen – Dettenhausen)	Württembergische Eisenbahn-Gesellschaft
RB 47	790.61	Korntal – Münchingen – Heimerdingen		30 min	Württembergische Eisenbahn-Gesellschaft
RB 51	676	Karlsruhe – Wörth (Rhein) – Neustadt (Weinstraße)		60 min	DB Regio Mitte
RB 52	752	Aulendorf – Bad Waldsee – Bad Wurzach		4 train pairs (Sun, May–October)	DB Regio Baden-Württemberg
RB 53	753, 766	(Albstadt-Ebingen –) Sigmaringen – Herbertingen – Aulendorf		120 min	DB Regio Baden-Württemberg
RB 54	754	Aulendorf – Altshausen – Pfullendorf		2 train pairs (Sun, May–October)	DB Regio Baden-Württemberg
RB 58	758	Amstetten (Württ.) – Gerstetten		3 train pairs (Sun, May–October)	Schwäbische Alb-Bahn
RB 59	755, 759	Gammertingen – Engstingen – Münsingen – Schelklingen (– Ulm Hbf)		6 train pairs (Gammertingen – Münsingen); 4 train pairs (Münsingen – Schelklingen); 2 train pairs(Schelklingen – Ulm)	Schwäbische Alb-Bahn
RB 59a	759, 768	Sigmaringen – Veringenstadt – Gammertingen – Trochtelfingen – Engstingen		3 train pairs (Sun, May–October)	SWEG
RB 61	790.21	Schorndorf – Rudersberg-Oberndorf		30 min	Württembergische Eisenbahn-Gesellschaft
RB 63	760, 763, 764	Herrenberg – Tübingen – Reutlingen – Metzingen (Württ.) – Bad Urach		30 min (Herrenberg – Metzingen); 60 min (Metzingen – Bad Urach)	DB Regio Baden-Württemberg
RB 64	790.81	Kirchheim (Teck) – Oberlenningen		60 min	DB Regio Baden-Württemberg
RB 65	762	Nürtingen – Neuffen		60 min	Württembergische Eisenbahn-Gesellschaft
RB 66	766	Tübingen Hbf – Hechingen – Balingen (Württ.) – Albstadt-Ebingen – Sigmaringen		30 min (Tübingen – Hechingen); 60 min (Hechingen – Sigmaringen)	SWEG
RB 67	767	Eyach – Haigerloch – Hechingen LB		120 min / 5 train pairs(Sun, May–October)	SWEG
RB 68	768	Hechingen – Gammertingen – Sigmaringen		60 min (Hechingen – Gammertingen); 120 min (Gammertingen – Sigmaringen)	SWEG
RB 68	650	Wiesloch-Walldorf – Heidelberg Hbf – Weinheim (Bergstr.) Hbf – Frankfurt (Main) Hbf		60 min	DB Regio Mitte
RB 69	769	Balingen (Württ.) – Schömberg (b. Balingen)		120 min / 5 train pairs (Sun, May–October)	SWEG
RB 69	654	Weinheim (Bergstr.) Hbf – Fürth (Odenwald)		30 min	DB Regio Mitte
RB 72	772	Pforzheim – Maulbronn West – Maulbronn Stadt		7 train pairs (Maulbronn West – Stadt); 3 train pairs (Pforzheim – Maulbronn West)	DB Regio Baden-Württemberg
RB 74	774	Tübingen Hbf – Rottenburg (Neckar) – Eyach – Horb – Nagold Stadtmitte – Pforzheim Hbf		30 min (Pforzheim – Nagold); 60 min (Nagold – Tübingen)	DB Regio Baden-Württemberg
RB 76 (Hermann-Hesse-Bahn)	776	Renningen – Malmsheim (planned extension for summer 2026) – Weil der Stadt – Ostelsheim – Althengstett – Calw-Heumaden – Calw		60 min (5:00 - 17:00)	SWEG Südwestdeutsche Landesverkehrs
RB 79	707	Neckarbischofsheim Nord – Neckarbischofsheim Stadt – Helmhof – Untergimpern – Obergimpern – Siegelsbach – Hüffenhardt		6 train pairs (May–October)	Albtal-Verkehrs-Gesellschaft
RB 82	641	Eberbach – Erbach – Michelstadt – Groß-Umstadt Wiebelsbach – Darmstadt Nord– Frankfurt Hbf		120 min	VIAS
RB 83	710.4, 783	Heilbronn Hbf – Weinsberg – Eschenau – Öhringen Hbf – Schwäbisch Hall-Hessental		120 min	Westfrankenbahn
RB 84	784	Miltenberg – Walldürn – Seckach (– Osterburken)		60 min	Westfrankenbahn
RB 85	780	Osterburken – Lauda – Würzburg Hbf		60 min	DB Regio Bayern
RB 88	781, 782	Crailsheim – Bad Mergentheim – Lauda – Tauberbischofsheim – Wertheim – Miltenberg – Aschaffenburg Hbf		60 min (Bad Mergentheim – Tauberbischofsheim); 120 min (Tauberbischofsheim – Wertheim); 120 min (Crailsheim – Bad Mergentheim)	Westfrankenbahn
RB 89	989	Aalen – Nördlingen – Donauwörth		120 min	Arverio Bayern
RB 91	751	Aulendorf – Ravensburg – Friedrichshafen Stadt – Friedrichshafen Hafen		30 min (Ravensburg – Friedrichshafen Hafen); 60 min (Aulendorf – Ravensburg)	Bodensee-Oberschwaben-Bahn
RB 92	753, 970	Memmingen – Kißlegg – Hergatz – Lindau-Insel – Lindau-Reutin		120 min	Arverio Bayern
RB 93	751	Friedrichshafen Stadt – Kressbronn – Lindau-Insel		60 min	DB Regio Baden-Württemberg

== S-Bahn Lines ==
=== Breisgau S-Bahn ===
Line	Route	KBS	Frequency	Material	Operator	Image
S1	Breisach – Freiburg Hauptbahnhof – Kirchzarten – Titisee – Seebrugg/Neustadt (Schwarzw)	727, 728	30 min	Siemens Mireo (class 463)	DB Regio Baden-Württemberg	
S10	Freiburg Hauptbahnhof – Kirchzarten – Titisee – Neustadt (Schwarz) – Donaueschingen – Villingen (Schwarzwald)	727	60 min	Siemens Mireo (class 463)	DB Regio Baden-Württemberg	
S11	Endingen am Kaiserstuhl – Freiburg Hauptbahnhof – Neustadt (Schwarzw)	727	30 min	Siemens Mireo (class 463)	DB Regio Baden-Württemberg	
S2	Freiburg Hauptbahnhof – Denzlingen – Bleibach – Elzach	726	30 min	Bombardier Talent 3	SWEG	
S3	Bad Krozingen – Staufen Süd – Münstertal	725	30 min	Bombardier Talent 3	SWEG	
S5	Breisach – Endingen am Kaiserstuhl – Riegel-Malterdingen	723	60 min	Bombardier Talent 3	SWEG	

=== Danube-Iller Regional S-Bahn ===
Line	Route	KBS	Frequency	Material	Operator	Image
RS 2	Ulm – Ulm-Donautal – Erbach (Württ) – Biberach (Riß) – Biberach (Riß) Süd	751	30 min	Stadler Regio Shuttle RS1	SWEG	
RS 3	Ulm – Söflingen – Blaustein – Blaubeuren – Ehingen (Donau) – Munderkingen	755	60 min	Alstom Coradia LINT	SWEG	
RS 5	Ulm – Langenau (Württ) – Giengen (Brenz) – Heidenheim – Aalen	757	60 min	Alstom Coradia LINT	SWEG	
RS 7	Ulm – Neu-Ulm – Senden – Illertissen – Memmingen	975	60 min	Alstom Coradia LINT	DB Regio Bayern	
RS 21	Ulm – Ulm-Donautal – Erbach (Württ) – Laupheim Stadt – Biberach (Riß) – Biberach (Riß) Süd	751	60 min	Class 425	DB Regio Baden-Württemberg	
RS 51	Ulm – Langenau (Württ)	757	60 min	Alstom Coradia LINT	SWEG	
RS 71	Ulm – Neu-Ulm – Senden – Weißenhorn	976	30 min	Alstom Coradia LINT	DB Regio Bayern	

=== Heilbronn Stadtbahn ===
Line	Route	KBS	Frequency	Material	Operator	Image
S 41	Heilbronn–MosbachHeilbronn Hbf/Willy-Brandt-Platz – Harmonie / Kunsthalle – – Neckarsulm – Bad Friedrichshall – Neckarelz – Mosbach	710.4	60 min	ET 2010	AVG, Stadtwerke Heilbronn	
S 42	Heilbronn–NeckarsulmHeilbronn Hauptbahnhof/Willy-Brandt-Platz – Harmonie / Kunsthalle – Technisches Schulzentrum – Kaufland – Neckarsulm	710.4	30 min	ET 2010	AVG, Stadtwerke Heilbronn	

=== Karlsruhe Stadtbahn ===
Line	Route	KBS	Frequency	Material	Operator	Image
S 1	Hochstetten–Bad HerrenalbHochstetten – Eggenstein-Leopoldshafen – Neureut – Yorckstraße – Marktplatz – Hauptbahnhof – Alb Valley Railway – Rüppurr – Ettlingen – Busenbach – Bad Herrenalb	710.1	30 min	NET 2012	AVG	
S 11	Hochstetten–IttersbachHochstetten – Eggenstein-Leopoldshafen – Neureut – Yorckstraße – Marktplatz – Hauptbahnhof – Albtalbahnhof – Rüppurr – Ettlingen – Busenbach – Ittersbach	710.1	30 min	NET 2012	AVG	
S 2	Spöck–RheinstettenSpöck – Blankenloch – Hagsfeld – Durlacher Tor – Marktplatz – Entenfang – Daxlanden – Rheinstetten	710.2	10 or 20 mins	NET 2012, GT6-70D/N, GT8-70D/N	VBK	
S 31	Karlsruhe Hauptbahnhof–OdenheimHauptbahnhof – Durlach – Bruchsal – Ubstadt Ort – Odenheim	710.3	20 or 30 min	GT8-100C/2S, GT8-100D/2S-M	AVG, DB Regio	
S 32	Karlsruhe Hauptbahnhof–MenzingenHauptbahnhof – Durlach – Bruchsal – Ubstadt Ort – Menzingen	710.3	20 or 30 min	GT8-100C/2S, GT8-100D/2S-M	AVG, DB Regio	
S 4	Karlsruhe Albtalbahnhof–Öhringen-CappelAlbtalbahnhof – Karlsruhe Hbf – Rüppurrer Tor – Kronenplatz – Durlacher Tor – Tullastraße / VBK – Durlach – Grötzingen Oberausstraße – Bretten – Eppingen – Heilbronn – Weinsberg – Öhringen-Cappel	710.4	30 min	NET 2012	AVG, Stadtwerke Heilbronn, DB Regio	
S 5	Wörth Dorschberg–Bietigheim-BissingenWörth am Rhein – Maxau – Entenfang – Yorckstraße – Marktplatz – Durlacher Tor – Tullastraße / VBK – Durlach – Grötzingen Oberausstraße – Pfinztal – Remchingen – Pforzheim – Mühlacker – Vaihingen an der Enz – Bietigheim-Bissingen	710.5	30 min	NET 2012, GT8-100C/2S, GT8-100D/2S-M	AVG, DB Regio	
S 51	Germersheim–MarktplatzGermersheim – Rheinzabern – Wörth am Rhein – Maxau – Westbahnhof – Hauptbahnhof – Markplatz – Durlacher Tor – Tullastraße / VBK – Durlach – Grötzingen Oberausstraße – Pfinztal – Remchingen – Pforzheim – Mühlacker – Vaihingen an der Enz – Bietigheim-Bissingen	710.5	30 min	NET 2012, GT8-100C/2S, GT8-100D/2S-M	AVG, DB Regio	
S 52	Germersheim–HauptbahnhofGermersheim – Rheinzabern – Wörth am Rhein – Entenfang – Yorckstraße – Markplatz – Hauptbahnhof	710.5	60 mins in the mornings and evenings, working days only, express services	NET 2012, GT8-100C/2S, GT8-100D/2S-M	AVG, DB Regio	
S 6	Pforzheim–Bad WildbadPforzheim – Neuenbürg – Bad Wildbad	710.6	30 min	GT8-100D/2S-M	AVG	
S 7	Karlsruhe Tullastraße–AchernAchern – Baden-Baden – Rastatt – Durmersheim – Albtalbahnhof – Karlsruhe Hbf – Rüppurrer Tor – Kronenplatz – Durlacher Tor – Tullastraße / VBK	710.7	30 min	NET 2012, GT8-100C/2S, GT8-100D/2S-M	AVG, DB Regio	
S 71	Karlsruhe Hauptbahnhof–AchernAchern – Baden-Baden – Rastatt – Malsch – Karlsruhe Hbf	710.7	60 min	NET 2012, GT8-100C/2S, GT8-100D/2S-M	AVG, DB Regio	
S 8	Eutingen im Gäu–Karlsruhe TullastraßeEutingen im Gäu – Freudenstadt Hbf – Baiersbronn – Forbach – Rastatt – Durmersheim – Karlsruhe Hbf – Rüppurrer Tor – Kronenplatz – Tullastraße / VBK	710.8	30 min	GT8-100D/2S-M	AVG, DB Regio	
S 81	Eutingen im Gäu–Karlsruhe HauptbahnhofBondorf – Eutingen im Gäu – Freudenstadt Hbf – Baiersbronn – Forbach – Rastatt – Malsch – Karlsruhe Hbf	710.8	1 trip as Regionalbahn	GT8-100D/2S-M	AVG, DB Regio	

=== Nuremberg S-Bahn ===
Line	Route	KBS	Frequency	Material	Operator	Image
S4	Nürnberg Hauptbahnhof – Nürnberg-Schweinau – Nürnberg-Stein – Unterasbach – Oberasbach – Anwanden – Roßtal – Roßtal Wegbrücke – Raitersaich – Heilsbronn – Petersaurach Nord – Wicklesgreuth – Sachsen (b Ansbach) – Ansbach – Leutershausen-Wiedersbach – Dombühl – Crailsheim	890.4	20/40 min	Bombardier Talent 2	DB Regio Bayern	

=== Ortenau-S-Bahn ===
Line	Route	KBS	Frequency	Material	Operator	Picture
RS 1	Offenburg – Biberach – Hausach – Freudenstadt	720, 721, 741	60 min	Siemens Mireo	SWEG	
RS 2	Offenburg – Appenweiler – Oberkirch – Bad Griesbach	702, 718	60 min	Siemens Mireo	SWEG	
RS 3	Offenburg – Achern – Ottenhöfen	702, 717	60 min	Siemens Mireo	SWEG	
RS 4	Strasbourg – Kehl – Appenweiler – Offenburg	702, 719	30 min	Siemens Mireo	SWEG	
RS 11	Hausach – Hornberg (Schwarzw)	720	60 min	Siemens Mireo	SWEG	
RS 12	Biberach – Oberharmersbach-Riersbach	722	60 min	Siemens Mireo	SWEG	

=== Rhine-Neckar S-Bahn ===
Line	Route	KBS	Frequency	Material	Operator	Image
S1	Homburg (Saar) Hauptbahnhof – Bruchmühlbach-Miesau – Hauptstuhl – Landstuhl – Kindsbach – Einsiedlerhof – Vogelweh – Kennelgarten – Kaiserslautern Hauptbahnhof – Hochspeyer – Frankenstein (Pfalz) – Weidenthal – Neidenfels – Lambrecht (Pfalz) – Neustadt (Weinstraße) Hauptbahnhof – Neustadt-Böbig – Haßloch (Pfalz) – Böhl-Iggelheim – Schifferstadt – Limburgerhof (– Ludwigshafen-Rheingönheim – Ludwigshafen-Mundenheim) – Ludwigshafen (Rh) Hauptbahnhof – Ludwigshafen (Rhein) Mitte – Mannheim Hauptbahnhof – Mannheim ARENA/Maimarkt – Mannheim-Seckenheim – Mannheim-Friedrichsfeld Süd – Heidelberg-Pfaffengrund/Wieblingen – Heidelberg Hauptbahnhof – Heidelberg-Weststadt/Südstadt – Heidelberg-Altstadt – Heidelberg-Schlierbach/Ziegelhausen – Heidelberg Orthopädie – Neckargemünd – Neckargemünd Altstadt – Neckarsteinach – Neckarhausen bei Neckarsteinach – Hirschhorn (Neckar) – Eberbach – Lindach – Zwingenberg (Baden) – Neckargerach – Binau – Mosbach-Neckarelz – Mosbach West – Mosbach (Baden) – Neckarburken – Dallau – Auerbach (b Mosbach, Baden) – Oberschefflenz – Eicholzheim – Seckach – Zimmern (b Seckach) – Adelsheim Nord – Osterburken	670; 665; 705; 665.1		DBAG Class 425	DB Regio Mitte	
S2	Kaiserslautern Hauptbahnhof – Hochspeyer – Frankenstein (Pfalz) – Weidenthal – Neidenfels – Lambrecht (Pfalz) – Neustadt (Weinstraße) Hauptbahnhof – Neustadt-Böbig – Haßloch (Pfalz) – Böhl-Iggelheim – Schifferstadt – Limburgerhof – Ludwigshafen-Rheingönheim – Ludwigshafen-Mundenheim – Ludwigshafen (Rh) Hauptbahnhof – Ludwigshafen (Rhein) Mitte – Mannheim Hauptbahnhof – Mannheim ARENA/Maimarkt – Mannheim-Seckenheim – Mannheim-Friedrichsfeld Süd – Heidelberg-Pfaffengrund/Wieblingen – Heidelberg Hauptbahnhof – Heidelberg-Weststadt/Südstadt – Heidelberg-Altstadt – Heidelberg-Schlierbach/Ziegelhausen – Heidelberg Orthopädie – Neckargemünd – Neckargemünd Altstadt – Neckarsteinach – Neckarhausen bei Neckarsteinach – Hirschhorn (Neckar) – Eberbach – Lindach – Zwingenberg (Baden) – Neckargerach – Binau – Mosbach-Neckarelz – Mosbach West – Mosbach (Baden)	670; 665; 705; 665.2		DBAG Class 425	DB Regio Mitte	
S3	Germersheim – Lingenfeld – Heiligenstein (Pfalz) – Berghausen (Pfalz) – Speyer Hauptbahnhof – Speyer Nord-West – Schifferstadt Süd – Schifferstadt – Limburgerhof – Ludwigshafen (Rh) Hauptbahnhof – Ludwigshafen (Rhein) Mitte – Mannheim Hauptbahnhof – Mannheim-Friedrichsfeld Süd – Heidelberg-Pfaffengrund/Wieblingen – Heidelberg Hauptbahnhof – Heidelberg-Kirchheim/Rohrbach – St Ilgen-Sandhausen – Wiesloch-Walldorf – Rot-Malsch – Bad Schönborn-Kronau – Bad Schönborn Süd – Stettfeld-Weiher – Ubstadt-Weiher – Bruchsal – Karlsruhe-Durlach – Karlsruhe Hauptbahnhof	677; 670; 665; 701		DBAG Class 425	DB Regio Mitte	
S33	Germersheim – Germersheim Mitte/Rhein – Rheinsheim – Philippsburg (Baden) – Huttenheim – Graben-Neudorf Nord – Graben-Neudorf – Karlsdorf – Bruchsal Am Mantel – Bruchsal Sportzentrum – Bruchsal	665.33		DBAG Class 425	DB Regio Mitte	
S4	Germersheim – Lingenfeld – Heiligenstein (Pfalz) – Berghausen (Pfalz) – Speyer Hauptbahnhof – Speyer Nord-West – Schifferstadt Süd – Schifferstadt – Limburgerhof – Ludwigshafen-Rheingönheim – Ludwigshafen-Mundenheim – Ludwigshafen (Rh) Hauptbahnhof – Ludwigshafen (Rhein) Mitte – Mannheim Hauptbahnhof – Mannheim ARENA/Maimarkt – Mannheim-Seckenheim – Mannheim-Friedrichsfeld Süd – Heidelberg-Pfaffengrund/Wieblingen – Heidelberg Hauptbahnhof – Heidelberg-Kirchheim/Rohrbach – St Ilgen-Sandhausen – Wiesloch-Walldorf – Rot-Malsch – Bad Schönborn-Kronau – Bad Schönborn Süd – Ubstadt-Weiher – Bruchsal	677; 670; 665; 701		DBAG Class 425	DB Regio Mitte	
S5	Heidelberg Hauptbahnhof – Heidelberg-Weststadt/Südstadt – Heidelberg-Altstadt – Heidelberg-Schlierbach/Ziegelhausen – Heidelberg Orthopädie – Neckargemünd – Bammental – Reilsheim – Mauer (b Heidelberg) – Meckesheim – Zuzenhausen – Hoffenheim – Sinsheim (Elsenz) Hauptbahnhof – Sinsheim Museum/Arena – Steinsfurt – Reihen – Ittlingen – Richen (b Eppingen) – Eppingen	705; 665.5		DBAG Class 425	DB Regio Mitte	
S51	Heidelberg Hauptbahnhof – Heidelberg-Weststadt/Südstadt – Heidelberg-Altstadt – Heidelberg-Schlierbach/Ziegelhausen – Heidelberg Orthopädie – Neckargemünd – Bammental – Reilsheim – Mauer (b Heidelberg) – Meckesheim – Eschelbronn – Neidenstein – Waibstadt – Neckarbischofsheim Nord – Helmstadt (Baden) – Aglasterhausen	705; 665.5		DBAG Class 425	DB Regio Mitte	
S6	Mainz Hauptbahnhof – Mainz Römisches Theater – Mainz-Laubenheim – Bodenheim – Nackenheim – Nierstein – Oppenheim – Dienheim – Guntersblum – Alsheim – Mettenheim – Osthofen – Worms Hauptbahnhof – Bobenheim – Frankenthal Hauptbahnhof – Frankenthal Süd – Ludwigshafen-Oggersheim – Ludwigshafen (Rh) Hauptbahnhof – Ludwigshafen (Rhein) Mitte – Mannheim Hauptbahnhof – Mannheim ARENA/Maimarkt – Mannheim-Seckenheim – Neu-Edingen/Friedrichsfeld – Ladenburg – Heddesheim/Hirschberg – Weinheim-Lützelsachsen – Weinheim (Bergstr) Hauptbahnhof – Hemsbach – Laudenbach (Bergstr) – Heppenheim (Bergstr) – Bensheim	660; 665.3–4; 650		DBAG Class 425	DB Regio Mitte	

=== Stuttgart S-Bahn ===
Line	Route	KBS	Frequency	Material	Operator	Image
S 1	Herrenberg – Nufringen – Gärtringen – Ehningen (b Böblingen) – Hulb – Böblingen – Goldberg (Württ) – Stuttgart-Rohr – Stuttgart-Vaihingen – Stuttgart-Österfeld – Stuttgart Universität – Stuttgart Schwabstraße – Stuttgart Feuersee – Stuttgart Stadtmitte – Stuttgart Hauptbahnhof – Stuttgart-Bad Cannstatt – Stuttgart Neckarpark – Stuttgart-Untertürkheim – Stuttgart-Obertürkheim – Esslingen-Mettingen – Esslingen (Neckar) – Oberesslingen – Esslingen-Zell – Altbach – Plochingen – Wernau (Neckar) – Wendlingen (Neckar) – Kirchheim (Teck)-Ötlingen – Kirchheim (Teck)	790.1	15/30 min	DB Class 423; DBAG Class 430	S-Bahn Stuttgart	
S 2	Filderstadt – Stuttgart Flughafen/Messe – Echterdingen – Leinfelden – Oberaichen – Stuttgart-Rohr – Stuttgart-Vaihingen – Stuttgart-Österfeld – Stuttgart Universität – Stuttgart Schwabstraße – Stuttgart Feuersee – Stuttgart Stadtmitte – Stuttgart Hauptbahnhof – Stuttgart-Bad Cannstatt – Stuttgart Nürnberger Straße – Stuttgart-Sommerrain – Fellbach – Waiblingen – Rommelshausen – Stetten-Beinstein – Endersbach – Beutelsbach – Grunbach – Geradstetten – Winterbach (b Schorndorf) – Weiler (Rems) – Schorndorf	790.2	15/30 min	DB Class 423; DBAG Class 430	S-Bahn Stuttgart	
S 3	Stuttgart Flughafen/Messe – Echterdingen – Leinfelden – Oberaichen – Stuttgart-Rohr – Stuttgart-Vaihingen – Stuttgart-Österfeld – Stuttgart Universität – Stuttgart Schwabstraße – Stuttgart Feuersee – Stuttgart Stadtmitte – Stuttgart Hauptbahnhof – Stuttgart-Bad Cannstatt – Stuttgart Nürnberger Straße – Stuttgart-Sommerrain – Fellbach – Waiblingen – Neustadt-Hohenacker – Schwaikheim – Winnenden – Nellmersbach – Maubach – Backnang	790.3	15/30 min	DB Class 423; DBAG Class 430	S-Bahn Stuttgart	
S 4	Stuttgart Schwabstraße – Stuttgart Feuersee – Stuttgart Stadtmitte – Stuttgart Hauptbahnhof – Stuttgart Nord – Stuttgart-Feuerbach – Stuttgart-Zuffenhausen – Kornwestheim – Ludwigsburg – Favoritepark – Freiberg (Neckar) – Benningen (Neckar) – Marbach (Neckar) – Erdmannhausen – Kirchberg (Murr) – Burgstall (Murr) – Backnang	790.4	15/30/60 min	DB Class 423; DBAG Class 430	S-Bahn Stuttgart	
S 5	Stuttgart Schwabstraße – Stuttgart Feuersee – Stuttgart Stadtmitte – Stuttgart Hauptbahnhof – Stuttgart Nord – Stuttgart-Feuerbach – Stuttgart-Zuffenhausen – Kornwestheim – Ludwigsburg – Asperg – Tamm (Württ) – Bietigheim-Bissingen	790.5	15/30 min	DB Class 423; DBAG Class 430	S-Bahn Stuttgart	
S 6	Stuttgart Schwabstraße – Stuttgart Feuersee – Stuttgart Stadtmitte – Stuttgart Hauptbahnhof – Stuttgart Nord – Stuttgart-Feuerbach – Stuttgart-Zuffenhausen – Neuwirtshaus (Porscheplatz) – Korntal – Weilimdorf – Ditzingen – Höfingen – Leonberg – Rutesheim – Renningen – Malmsheim – Weil der Stadt	790.6	15/30 min	DB Class 423; DBAG Class 430	S-Bahn Stuttgart	
S 60	Stuttgart Schwabstraße – Stuttgart Feuersee – Stuttgart Stadtmitte – Stuttgart Hauptbahnhof – Stuttgart Nord – Stuttgart-Feuerbach – Stuttgart-Zuffenhausen – Neuwirtshaus (Porscheplatz) – Korntal – Weilimdorf – Ditzingen – Höfingen – Leonberg – Rutesheim – Renningen – Renningen Süd – Magstadt – Maichingen Nord – Maichingen – Sindelfingen – Böblingen	790.6	30 min	DB Class 423; DBAG Class 430	S-Bahn Stuttgart	
S 62 (as of 12 September 2022)	(Stuttgart-Feuerbach –) Stuttgart-Zuffenhausen – Korntal – Weilimdorf – Ditzingen – Leonberg – Weil der Stadt	790.6	30 min (during rush hour)	DBAG Class 430	S-Bahn Stuttgart	

== International S-Bahn lines ==
=== Aargau S-Bahn ===
Line	Route	KBS	Frequency	Material	Operator	Picture
S27	Baden – Waldshut	730.4	60 min	RBDe 560	SBB	

=== Basel S-Bahn ===
Line	Route	KBS	Frequency	Material	Operator	Picture
RB27	Freiburg – Müllheim – Bad Bellingen – Weil am Rhein – Basel Bad Bf	702	60 min	Siemens Mireo	DB Regio Baden-Württemberg	
RB30	Basel Bad Bf – Rheinfelden – Bad Säckingen – Waldshut – Lauchringen West	730	60 min	Bombardier Talent, Alstom Coradia A TER	DB Regio Baden-Württemberg	
S5	Weil am Rhein – Lörrach – Steinen – Zell (Wiesental)	735	30 min	Stadler GTW	Thurbo	
S6	Basel SBB – Basel Bad Bf – Lörrach – Steinen – Zell (Wiesental)	735	30 min	Stadler GTW	Thurbo	

=== Bodensee S-Bahn ===
Line	Route	KBS	Frequency	Material	Operator	Picture
S6; Seehas	720, 730	Engen – Mühlhausen (bei Engen) – Singen (Hohentwiel) – Radolfzell – Allensbach – Konstanz		30 min	SBB Deutschland	
S 61	732	Stockach – Radolfzell		30 min	DB Regio Baden-Württemberg	
==== Schaffhausen S-Bahn ====
S62	Schaffhausen – Singen – Radolfzell	720	30 min	Stadler GTW	Thurbo, SBB GmbH	
==== St. Gallen S-Bahn ====
S14	Konstanz – Kreuzlingen – Siegershausen – Weinfelden	720	30 min	Stadler GTW	Thurbo	
S44	Konstanz – Kreuzlingen – Weinfelden	720	120 min	Stadler GTW	Thurbo	

=== Schaffhausen S-Bahn ===
These S-Bahn lines are not part of Bodensee S-Bahn.

Line	Route	KBS	Frequency	Material	Operator	Picture
S64	Schaffhausen – Beringen Bad Bf – Erzingen (Baden)	720	120 min	Stadler GTW	Thurbo, SBB GmbH	
S65	Schaffhausen – Neuhausen – Jestetten(Baden)	720	120 min	Stadler GTW	Thurbo, SBB GmbH	

=== Zurich S-Bahn ===
Line	Route	KBS	Frequency	Material	Operator	Picture
S36	Bülach – Bad Zurzach – Waldshut	730.4	60 min	Stadler GTW	Thurbo	

== See also ==
- List of scheduled railway routes in Germany
