= Rastatt station =

Railway station in Rastatt, Germany

Rastatt
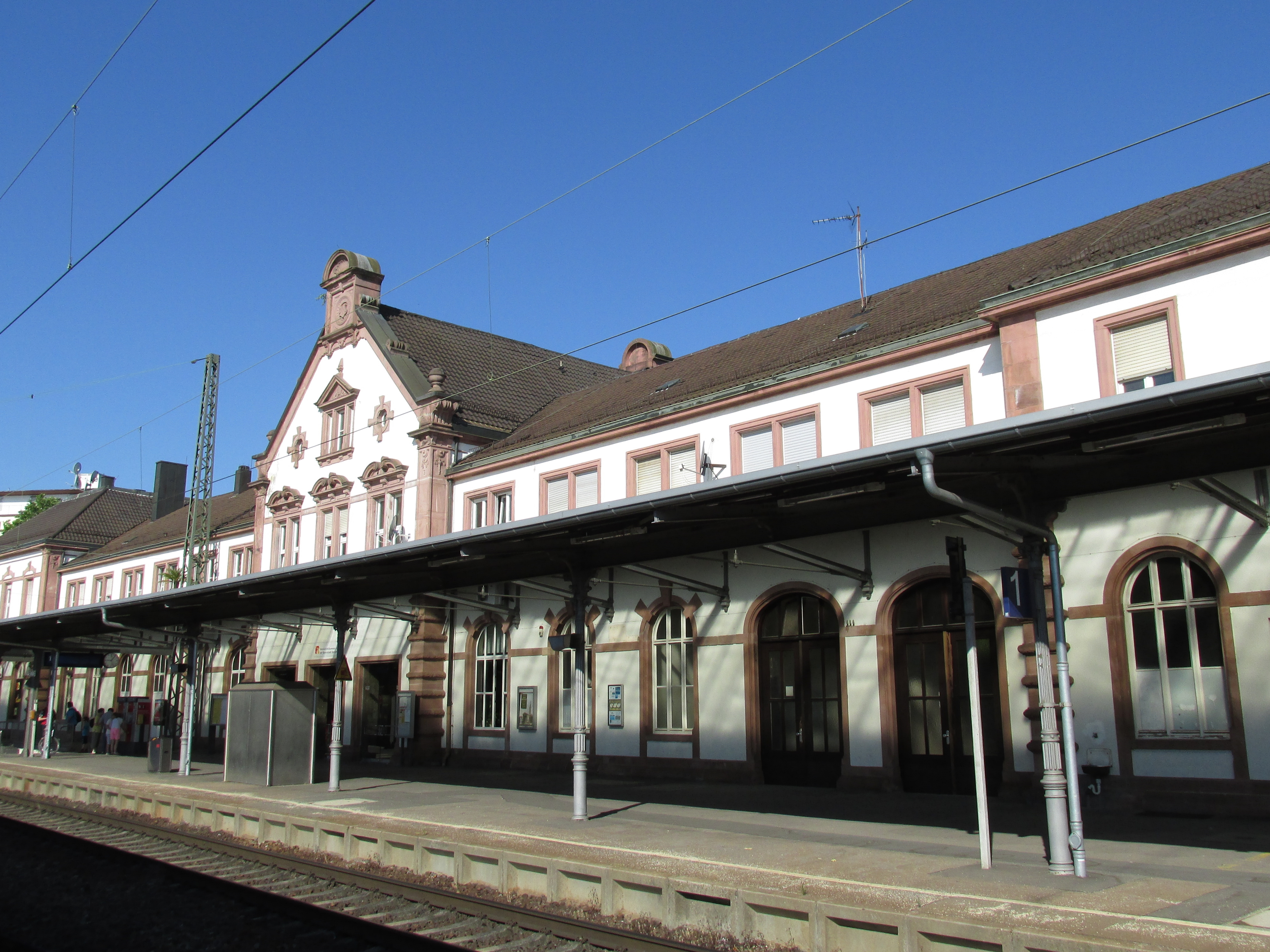

General information
- Location: Bahnhofstr. 56, Rastatt, Baden-Württemberg; Germany
- Coordinates: 48°51′38″N 8°12′56″E
- Owner: Deutsche Bahn
- Operator: DB Netz; DB Station&Service
- Lines: Rhine Valley Railway (km 96.5; KBS 702, KBS 710.3); Rhine Railway (km 82,9; KBS 702, KBS 710.41); Murg Valley Railway (km 0,0; KBS 710.41)
- Platforms: 6

Construction
- Accessible: Yes

Other information
- Station code: 5125
- DS100 code: RRA
- IBNR: 8000306
- Category: 4
- Fare zone: KVV: 361
- Website: www.bahnhof.de

History
- Opened: 1890
Services
Preceding station	DB Regio Baden-Württemberg	Following station
Karlsruhe Hbf Terminus	RE 2	Baden-Baden towards Konstanz
Preceding station	DB Regio Mitte	Following station
Karlsruhe Hbf towards Ludwigshafen Hbf	RE 7	Baden-Baden towards Freudenstadt Hbf
Karlsruhe Hbf Terminus	RE 40	Gaggenau towards Freudenstadt Hbf
Rastatt Beinle towards Karlsruhe Hbf	RB 41	Muggensturm towards Forbach
Muggensturm towards Karlsruhe Hbf	RB 44	Baden-Baden-Haueneberstein towards Achern
Preceding station	Karlsruhe Stadtbahn	Following station
Ötigheim towards Karlsruhe Tullastraße	S 7	Baden-Baden-Haueneberstein towards Achern
Muggensturm towards Karlsruhe Hbf	S 71	Baden-Baden-Haueneberstein towards Achern
Ötigheim towards Karlsruhe Tullastraße / Alter Schlachthof	S 8	Rastatt Beinle towards Bondorf (b Herrenberg)
Muggensturm towards Karlsruhe Hbf	S 81	Rastatt Beinle towards Bondorf (b Herrenberg)
Location

Rastatt station is the main passenger station in the town of Rastatt in the German state of Baden-Württemberg. It is an important station for the Karlsruhe Stadtbahn, being served by four of its lines, which are operated by the Albtal-Verkehrs-Gesellschaft ("Alb Valley Transport Company", AVG). In addition, it is served by regional and long-distance trains operated by Deutsche Bahn. The station is located at chainage 96.5 km on the Rhine Valley Railway and at chainage 82.9 on the Rhine Railway (both chainages are based on the original distance from Mannheim). The station is also the beginning of the Murg Valley Railway.

== History ==
The town of Rastatt received its first rail connection on 6 May 1844, when the Grand Duchy of Baden State Railway (German: Großherzogliche Badische Staatsbahn) opened the Karlsruhe–Rastatt section of the Rhine Valley Railway. Since at that time Rastatt was a fortress of the German Confederation and was protected by ramparts and a ditch, the line ran to the east of the town at first. The first Rastatt station was therefore situated in what is now an industrial district.

On 31 May 1869, the first section of the Murg Valley Railway was opened and Rastatt station became a junction station.

With the abolition of the fortifications in 1890, the station was relocated to the west, nearer the centre of the town, and the current entrance building was built.

In 1895 a third railway, the Rhine Railway, was extended for strategic reasons from Karlsruhe to Haguenau, which had become part of Germany as a result of the Franco-Prussian War of 1870-71. The section of the line that crossed the border to France, as re-established by border changes in 1918 and 1945, was closed in 1966.

The station was electrified in the 1950s as part of the electrification of the Rhine Valley Railway and the Rhine Railway.

In 1994 Rastatt was connected to the network of the Karlsruhe Stadtbahn. At first Stadtbahn services only operated on the Rhine Railway, in the following years, Stadtbahn services were also extended to the Rhine Valley Railway and the Murg Valley Railway, so the station is now served by four Stadtbahn routes.

== Layout of the station ==
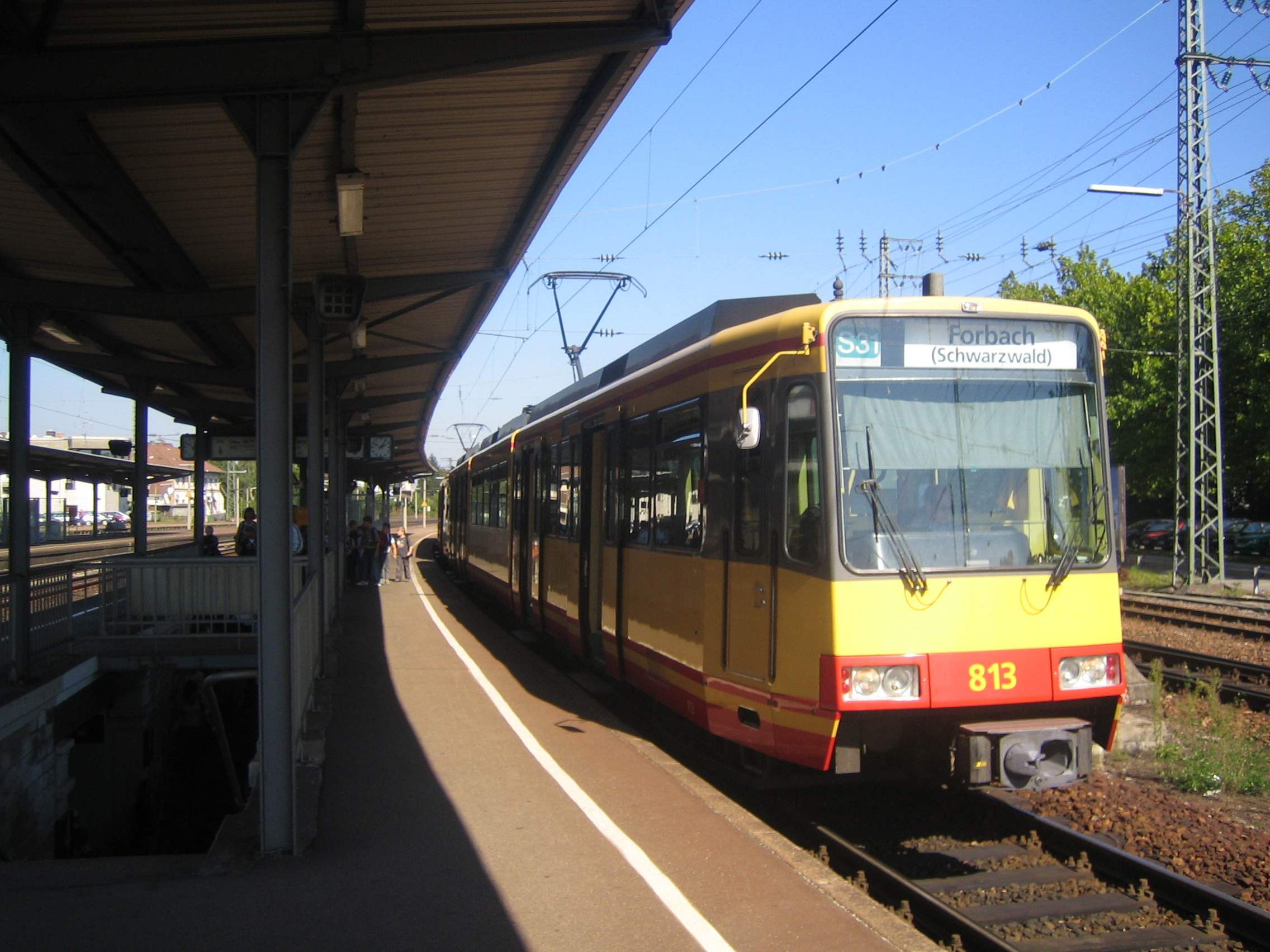
Stadtbahn service in Rastatt station

The station has six platform tracks, all of which are through tracks. Track 1 is the main platform next to the entrance building. The other five tracks are on three island platforms. Deutsche Bahn regional and long distance trains and Karlsruhe Stadtbahn services to and from Baden-Baden operate on tracks 3 and 4. Stadtbahn services to and from the Murg Valley Railway and Freudenstadt operate on tracks 5 and 6. Tracks 1 and 2 are no longer regularly used by passenger services; earlier they were used by cross-border trains on the Rhine Railway.

North of the passenger station is Rastatt freight yard. To the west of the station is the Rastatt central bus station, which is served by several town and regional bus routes of the Verkehrsgesellschaft Rastatt (Rastatt Transport Company), operated under the brand name of Rastadtbus.

== Operations ==
=== Regional Transport ===
Line	Route	Frequency
RE 2	Karlsruhe – Rastatt – Baden-Baden – Achern – Offenburg – Villingen – Singen – Konstanz	Hourly
RE 7	Karlsruhe – Rastatt – Baden-Baden – Offenburg – Freiburg – Müllheim – Neuenburg / Basel Bad Bf (– Basel SBB)	Some trains
RE 40	Freudenstadt – Baiersbronn – Forbach (Schwarzw) – Rastatt – Karlsruhe	Every 2 hours
RB 41	Forbach (Schwarzw) – Gernsbach – Gaggenau – Rastatt – Muggensturm – Ettlingen West – Karlsruhe	Hourly, Mon–Fri
RB 44	(Achern – Baden-Baden –) Rastatt – Muggensturm – Ettlingen West – Karlsruhe	Hourly

=== Karlsruhe Stadtbahn ===
Line	Route
S 7	Achern – Baden-Baden – Rastatt – Durmersheim – Karlsruhe Bahnhofsvorplatz – Karlsruhe Tullastraße/Verkehrsbetriebe
S 71	Achern – Baden-Baden – Rastatt – Muggensturm – Karlsruhe Hbf
S 8	(Herrenberg –) Eutingen im Gäu – Freudenstadt – Baiersbronn – Forbach (Schwarzw) – Rastatt – Durmersheim – Karlsruhe Bahnhofsvorplatz – Karlsruhe Tullastraße/Verkehrsbetriebe
S 81	(Eutingen im Gäu –) Freudenstadt – Baiersbronn – Forbach (Schwarzw) – Rastatt – Muggensturm – Karlsruhe Hbf
