= Baden-Baden station =

Railway station in Baden-Baden, Baden-Württemberg, Germany

Baden-Baden
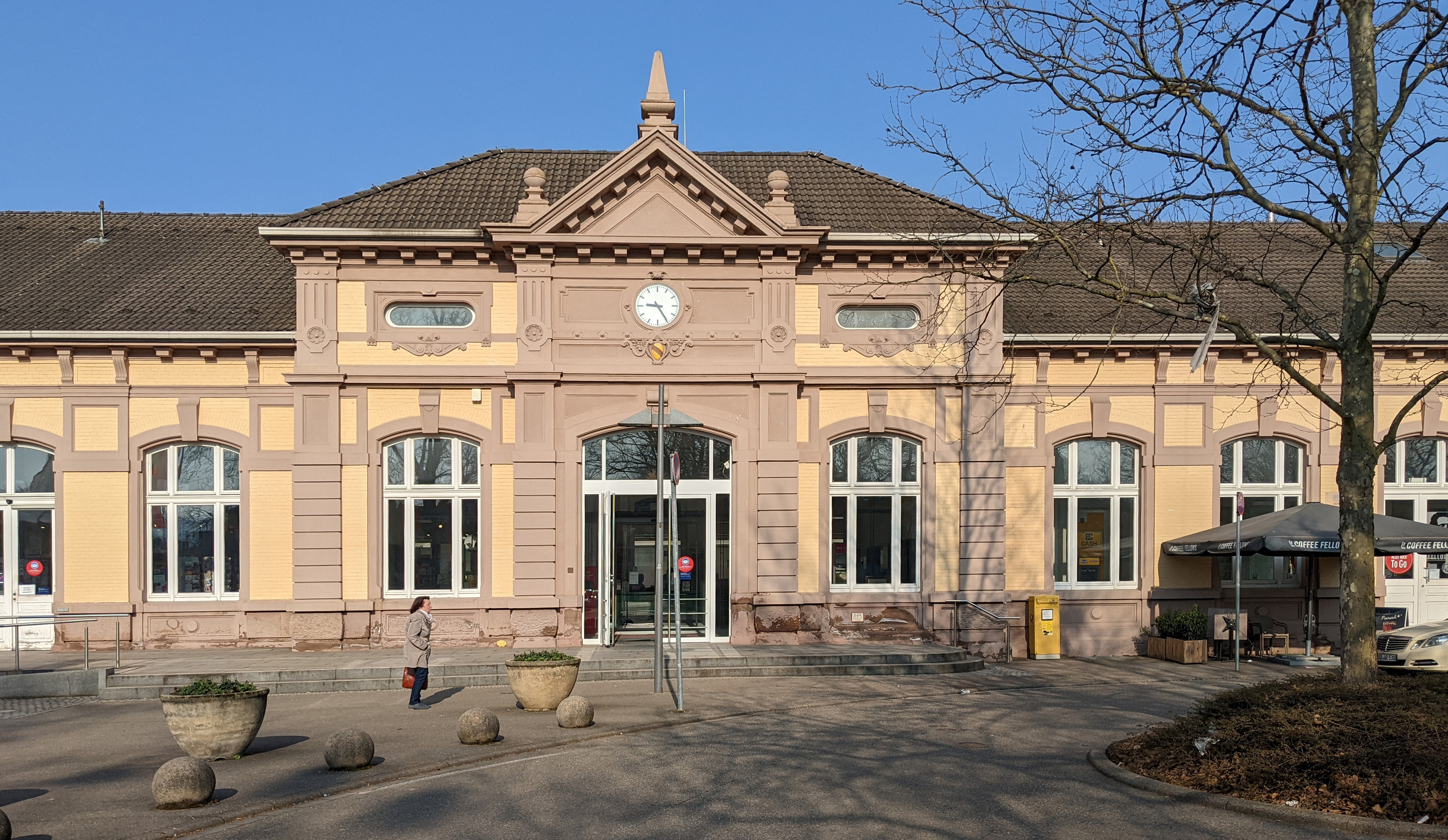

General information
- Location: Baden-Baden, Baden-Württemberg; Germany
- Coordinates: 48°47′26″N 8°11′27″E
- Owner: Deutsche Bahn
- Operator: DB Station&Service
- Lines: Rhine Valley Railway (105.3; KBS 702, KBS 710.3, KBS 710.4 km); Baden-Oos–Baden-Baden railway (0.0 km) until 1977
- Platforms: 5
- Connections: S 7S 71

Construction
- Accessible: Yes

Other information
- Station code: 371
- DS100 code: RBB
- IBNR: 8000774
- Category: 3
- Fare zone: KVV: 480
- Website: www.bahnhof.de

History
- Opened: 1844; 182 years ago
- Former names: Oos; Baden-Oos; Baden-Baden West

Passengers
- 6000
Services
| Preceding station | DB Fernverkehr | Following station |
|---|---|---|
| Karlsruhe Hbf One-way operation | ICE 12 | Offenburg towards Interlaken Ost |
| Karlsruhe Hbf towards Hamburg Hbf | ICE/ECE 20 | Offenburg towards Basel SBB |
| Karlsruhe Hbf One-way operation | ICE 22 | Offenburg towards Basel Bad Bf |
| Karlsruhe Hbf towards Hamburg-Altona | ICE 43 | Offenburg towards Basel SBB, Chur or Brig |
| Karlsruhe Hbf towards München Hbf | ICE 60 | Offenburg towards Basel SBB |
| Karlsruhe Hbf towards Frankfurt (Main) Hbf | ICE/TGV 84 | Strasbourg towards Marseille |
| Preceding station | | Following station |
| Karlsruhe Hbf towards Berlin Hbf | FLX 10 | Offenburg One-way operation |
| Preceding station | DB Regio Baden-Württemberg | Following station |
| Rastatt towards Karlsruhe Hbf | RE 2 | Bühl (Baden) towards Konstanz |
| Rastatt towards Karlsruhe Hbf | RE 7 | Bühl (Baden) towards Basel Bad Bf |
| Preceding station | DB Regio Mitte | Following station |
| Terminus | RB 44 | Baden-Baden Haueneberstein towards Karlsruhe Hbf |
| Preceding station | Karlsruhe Stadtbahn | Following station |
| Sinzheim (b. Bühl) Nord towards Achern | S 7 | Baden-Baden-Haueneberstein towards Karlsruhe Tullastraße / Alter Schlachthof |
| Sinzheim (b. Bühl) Nord towards Achern | S 71 | Baden-Baden-Haueneberstein towards Karlsruhe Hbf |
Location

Baden-Baden station is the most important of the three railway stations in the city of Baden-Baden in the German state of Baden-Württemberg. It is regularly served by local and long distance trains operated by Deutsche Bahn. It is also the served by two lines of the Karlsruhe Stadtbahn, operated by Albtal-Verkehrs-Gesellschaft ("Alb Valley Transport Company", AVG). The station is located at chainage 105.3 km on the Rhine Valley Railway (based on the original distance from Mannheim) in the Baden-Baden district of Oos. Until 1977, it was also the starting point of a branch line to the centre of Baden-Baden.

== History ==
On 6 May 1844, the Grand Duchy of Baden State Railway (German: Großherzogliche Badische Staatsbahn) opened the station along with the Rhine Valley Railway from Rastatt. At that time the station was called Oos. Initially it had a small wooden station building. For a year passengers used horse buses to be transported to Baden-Baden until finally on 27 July 1845 a branch line was opened to Baden-Baden with a terminal station in the city centre.

In 1904, the station received a new station building, which continues to serve as such. In 1908, it was renamed Baden-Oos.

In 1928 the community of Oos was incorporated into Baden-Baden and the station was renamed Baden-Baden West. This change of name, however, was reversed in 1937 and the station was again called Baden-Oos. On 2 January 1945 the station was heavily damaged by bombs during an air raid.

From 1926 to 1949 the station had a tram connection to Lichtental. In 1949 the trams were replaced by trolleybuses, which in 1971 were closed.

In the 1950s, the railway lines through the station were electrified. Therefore, it was served at the time mainly by electric multiple units.

On 24 September 1977, the last train operated on the branch line to Baden-Baden city, after which its station was closed down and its tracks removed. Baden-Oos station was finally renamed Baden-Baden.

In the course of the upgrading of the Rhine Valley Railway to four tracks as part of the Neu- und Ausbaustrecke (new and upgraded line) project between Karlsruhe and Basel there was a fundamental modernisation of the railway facilities and the entrance building between 1997 and 2005. All of the platforms were provided with lifts accessible to all. In addition, the facade was repainted and the interior was renovated. This renovation cost a total of about €14.9 million. The Architectural Association of Baden-Württemberg awarded the "Award for exemplary Building, 2008" to the city Baden-Baden for the modernisation of the station.

The Alliance for the Rail Station Association awarded the title of "Station of the Year" in the category of small town station to the station in 2010.

== Layout of the station ==
The station has five platform tracks, all of which are through tracks. Track 1 is the main platform next to the entrance building. Tracks 2 and 3 are on an island platform. Tracks 4 and 7 are on two platforms with one side used by stopping trains. Between platforms 4 and 7 are two tracks used by non-stopping trains, including the majority of Intercity-Express services. All platforms are connected by two subways that are accessible by the disabled. The station building houses a DB ticket office, two cafes, a bookstore and a hotel.

The bus station is located east of the station building and is connected directly by a covered walkway to platform 1. The bus station has connections, inter alia, to the Baden-Baden city centre. The buses are operated by the Baden-Baden-Linie company.

== Operations ==
143 trains a day stop at Baden-Baden station, 43 of which are long-distance trains. The station was served by the following long-distance services in 2026:

=== Long distance ===
| Line | Route | Frequency |
|---|---|---|
| ICE 12 | Berlin Ostbahnhof → Berlin → Brunswick → Kassel – Frankfurt → Mannheim → Karlsruhe → Baden-Baden → Freiburg → Basel → Bern → Interlaken East | Some services |
| ICE/ECE 20 | Hamburg – Hanover – Göttingen – Kassel – Frankfurt am Main – Mannheim – Karlsruhe – Baden-Baden – Freiburg – Basel | Every two hours |
| ICE 43 | Hamburg-Altona – Hamburg - Bremen - Osnabrück - Münster - Dortmund – Hagen – Wuppertal – Cologne – Frankfurt Airport – Mannheim – Karlsruhe – (Baden-Baden –) Offenburg – Freiburg – Basel | Some services |
| ICE 60 | Basel – Freiburg – Offenburg – Baden-Baden Karlsruhe – Stuttgart – Ulm – Augsburg – Munich-Pasing – Munich | 1 train pair |
| ICE/TGV 84 | Marseille - Aix TGV - Avignon TGV - Lyon-Part-Dieu - Mâcon-Ville - Besançon Franche-Comté - Belfort-Montbéliard - Mulhouse - Strasbourg - Baden-Baden - Karlsruhe Hbf - Mannheim Hbf - Frankfurt Hbf | 1 train pair |

=== Regional Transport ===
| Line | Route | Frequency |
|---|---|---|
| RE 2 | Karlsruhe – Rastatt – Baden-Baden – Achern – Offenburg – Villingen – Singen – Konstanz (– Kreuzlingen) | Hourly |
| RE 7 | Karlsruhe – Rastatt – Baden-Baden – Offenburg – Freiburg – Müllheim – Neuenburg/Basel Bad – (Basel SBB) | Hourly, with gaps |

=== Karlsruhe Stadtbahn ===
| Line | Route |
|---|---|
| S 7 | Achern – Baden-Baden – Rastatt – Durmersheim – Karlsruhe Hbf – Karlsruhe Tullastraße/Verkehrsbetriebe |
| S 71 | Achern – Baden-Baden – Rastatt – Muggensturm – Karlsruhe Hbf |

== See also ==
- Rail transport in Germany
- Railway stations in Germany
