= Metropolexpress =

Regional rail in Baden-Württemberg, Germany

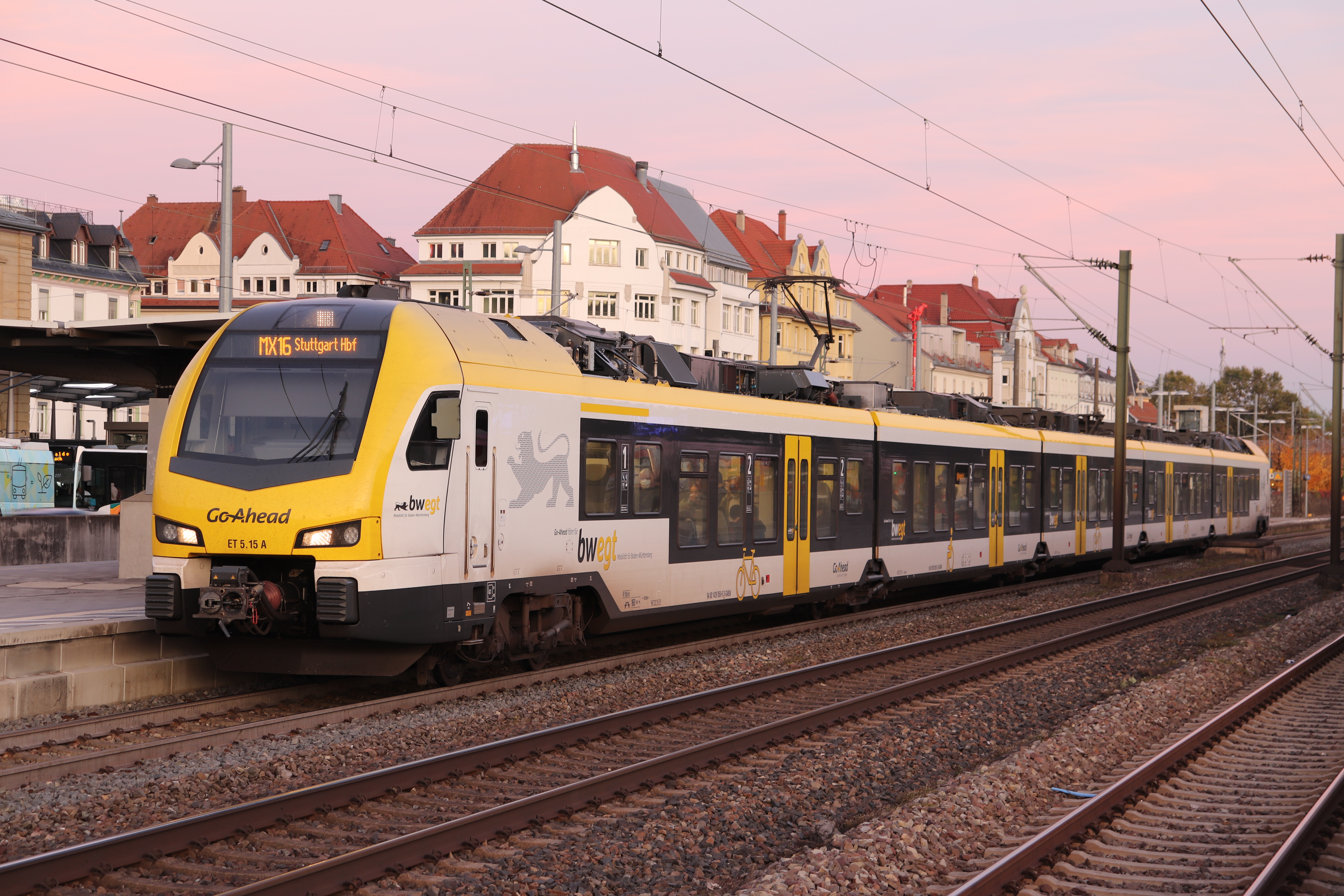
MEX 16 to Stuttgart in Esslingen (Neckar)

The Metropolexpress, abbreviated MEX, is a train type introduced in June 2021 for local rail passenger transport in Baden-Württemberg.

== Concept ==
The aim of the concept is to serve the main lines in the Stuttgart Metropolitan Region between Stuttgart Hauptbahnhof and the surrounding rural and urban districts outside the Stuttgart S-Bahn area at a dense frequency. This is to be done on weekdays between 5 AM and 0 AM every 30 minutes. In addition, an hourly night service will be introduced on weekends between 0 AM and 5AM. As in the case of the former Stadt-Express, MEX trains will stop at all stations outside the S-Bahn area, but only at important interchanges with the S-Bahn and city services.

== Lines and history ==
On behalf of the responsible Public Transport Authority, the Nahverkehrsgesellschaft Baden-Württemberg (NVBW), the following connections are offered, all of which are linked in Stuttgart:

Line		Route		Railway company	Vehicles	Renaming
MEX	before	MEX-Route	further course	Railway company	Vehicles	Renaming
MEX 13	RB 13	Stuttgart – Waiblingen – Schorndorf – Schwäbisch Gmünd – Aalen	Aalen – Ellwangen – Crailsheim	Arverio Baden-Württemberg	Siemens Mireo	12 December 2021
MEX 16	RB 16	Stuttgart – Esslingen – Plochingen – Göppingen – Geislingen	Geislingen – Amstetten – Ulm	Arverio Baden-Württemberg	Flirt 3	13 June 2021
MEX 17a/c	RB17a/c	Bietigheim-Bissingen – Vaihingen – Mühlacker – Pforzheim	Stuttgart – Ludwigsburg – Bietigheim-Bissingen; Pforzheim – Wilferdingen-Singen – Karlsruhe; Mühlacker – Bretten – Bruchsal	DB Regio Stuttgart GmbH	Talent 2	11 December 2022
MEX 12	RE 12	Tübingen – Reutlingen – Metzingen – Nürtingen – Plochingen – Esslingen – Stuttgart – Ludwigsburg – Bietigheim-Bissingen – Heilbronn	Heilbronn – Bad Friedrichshall – Mosbach-Neckarelz	DB Regio Stuttgart GmbH	Talent 2	11 December 2022
MEX 18	RB 18	Tübingen – Reutlingen – Metzingen – Nürtingen – Plochingen – Esslingen – Stuttgart – Ludwigsburg – Bietigheim-Bissingen – Heilbronn	Heilbronn – Bad Friedrichshall – Möckmühl – Osterburken	DB Regio Stuttgart GmbH	Talent 2	11 December 2022
MEX 19/MEX90	RB 19/RB90	Stuttgart – Waiblingen – Backnang – Murrhardt	Murrhardt – Gaildorf West – Schwäbisch Hall-Hessental – Crailsheim	DB Regio AG Baden-Württemberg	Talent 2	12 December 2021

Within the core area designated as MEX routes, trains run every half hour. On the Stuttgart-Murrhardt section, the half-hourly interval is created by overlapping the hourly MEX 19, the two-hourly MEX 90 and the two-hourly RE 90 (Stuttgart-Nürnberg). On the Tübingen-Heilbronn section, the half-hourly interval is created by overlapping the hourly MEX 12 and the hourly MEX 18.

Before the renaming to MEX, the lines were for the most part already served by Regionalbahn (RB) or Regional-Express (RE) trains every half hour under the same or similar line number. In order not to break existing lines, lines that partly also run outside the Metropolexpress core area are also called MEX there, although they run there at thinner intervals.

In the context of the Reactivation of the Black Forest Railway, a Metropolexpress between Stuttgart and Calw has been discussed and was reactivated, being renamed into the Hermann-Hesse-Bahn, however, it only runs to Weil der Stadt, with plans to extend services to Renningen. Its implementation is included in the concept of the Ministry of Transport Baden-Württemberg.

As part of the negotiations between the federal state and the Schwarzwald-Baar-Kreis, in addition to the electrification of the Ringzug network, the establishment of a Metropolexpress Villingen-Stuttgart connection via the previously non-electrified Rottweil-Villingen railway was agreed.
