= Bad Krozingen station =

Railway station in Bad Krozingen, Germany

Bad Krozingen
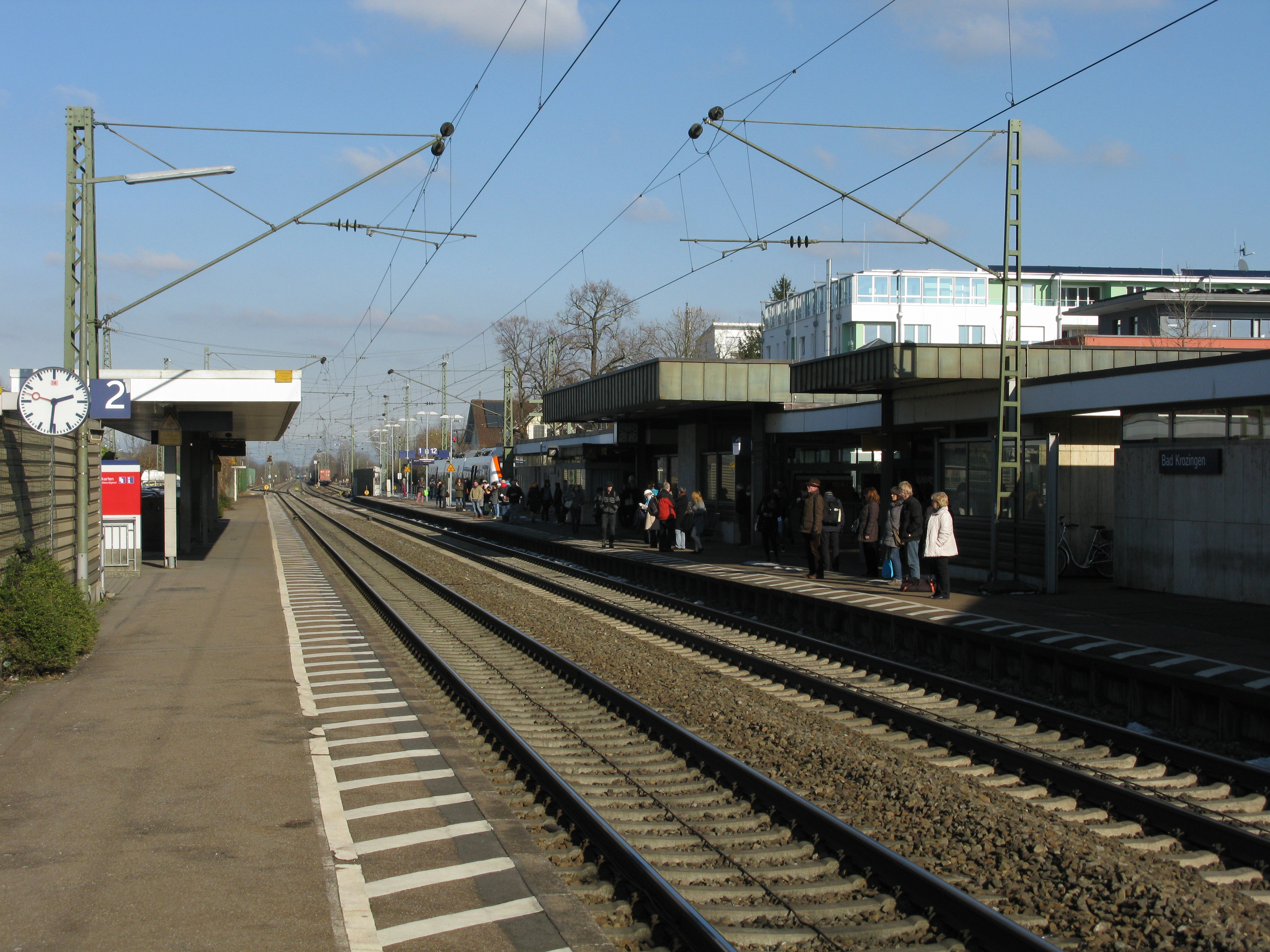
- View of platforms 1 and 2 (2015)

General information
- Location: Bahnhofstr. 2, Bad Krozingen; Germany
- Coordinates: 47°55′11″N 7°41′53″E
- Lines: Rhine Valley Railway (km 222.9); Münstertal Railway (km 0.0)
- Tracks: 2

Construction
- Accessible: Yes

Other information
- Station code: 297
- DS100 code: RURB
- IBNR: 8005990
- Category: 4
- Fare zone: RVF: B
- Website: www.bahnhof.de

History
- Opened: 1847

Services
Preceding station	DB Regio Baden-Württemberg	Following station
Schallstadt towards Karlsruhe Hbf	RE 7	Heitersheim towards Basel Bad Bf
Norsingen towards Emmendingen	RB 27	Heitersheim towards Basel Bad Bf or Neuenburg (Baden)
Preceding station	Breisgau S-Bahn	Following station
Terminus	S3	Bad Krozingen Ost towards Münstertal
Location

Bad Krozingen station is the most important station in the spa town of Bad Krozingen. It is located on the Rhine Valley Railway (Rheintalbahn) and the Bad Krozingen–Münstertal railway, which has started here since 1894.

== Infrastructure ==
=== Platforms ===
The station on the Rhine Valley Railway (Staatsbahnhof or state station) has always had two platform tracks with side platforms, with platform 1 next to the station building. Next to the northwestern platform 2, there was formerly a goods shed, also with a side platform, on a loading track. It was demolished after the abandonment of freight handling. On platform 2 there was also a mechanical interlocking, which has also been demolished. North of the passenger stations there were sidings and passing tracks. The connection to the Münstertal line used to be in this area, but it was removed in 2014.

The trains of the branch line terminate northeast of the entrance building next to platform 1. The platform is referred to as "platform 12". At the end of the line there was originally a turntable, which was replaced in the mid-1930s with a set of points. Its sidings were a little further north beside the tracks of the state railway. In 1977, the tracks were rebuilt to allow journeys from Münstertal to Freiburg (and vice versa), requiring trains to reverse in the station.

=== Entrance building ===
The former station building was a two-story masonry construction with a single-storey annex. The modern entrance building was built in 1977.

== History ==
The station was opened in 1847 with the Rhine Valley Railway. The branch line from the station to Sulzburg was opened on 20 December 1894. The operations on the line were taken over by the German Railway Operating Company (Deutsche Eisenbahn-Betriebs-Gesellschaft, DEBG) from the initial operator, Vering & Waechter, on 31 March 1899. On 1 May 1916 this line was extended to Münstertal. Since 1963, the Südwestdeutsche Verkehrs-Aktiengesellschaft (Southwest German Transport Company, SWEG) has been responsible for the operation of this branch line.

The Rhine Valley Railway was electrified through the station in 1955. The railway to Sulzburg was closed in 1973 after passenger services had been replaced by buses in 1969. The line to Munster was upgraded and electrified in 2013.

Bad Krozingen was regular served by express trains until the end of the 1980s. So, for instance, in the 1987 timetable, two pairs of trains ran on the Freiburg–Schaffhausen–Munich route and a pair of trains ran on the Basel–Saarbrücken route. Furthermore, each connected with a service to Ludwigshafen and Offenburg.

== Rail services ==
The following services stopped at Bad Krozingen in December 2023.

Rail services
Service	Route	Frequency
RE 7	Offenburg – Emmendingen – Freiburg – Bad Krozingen – Müllheim (Baden) – Weil am Rhein – Basel Bad Bf (– Basel SBB)	Hourly
RB 26	Müllheim (Baden) – Bad Krozingen Freiburg – Denzlingen – Riegel-Malterdingen – Offenburg	Some trains on weekdays
RB 27	(Emmendingen –) Freiburg – Ebringen – Schallstadt – Bad Krozingen – Heitersheim – Müllheim (Baden) – Neuenburg (Baden) / Basel Bad Bf	Hourly
S3	(Freiburg –) Bad Krozingen – Oberkrozingen – Staufen – Münstertal	Half-hourly

There are additional services in the peak hour.

In addition, the station is also served by several bus lines.
