= Ulm-Donautal station =

Railway station in Germany

Ulm Donautal
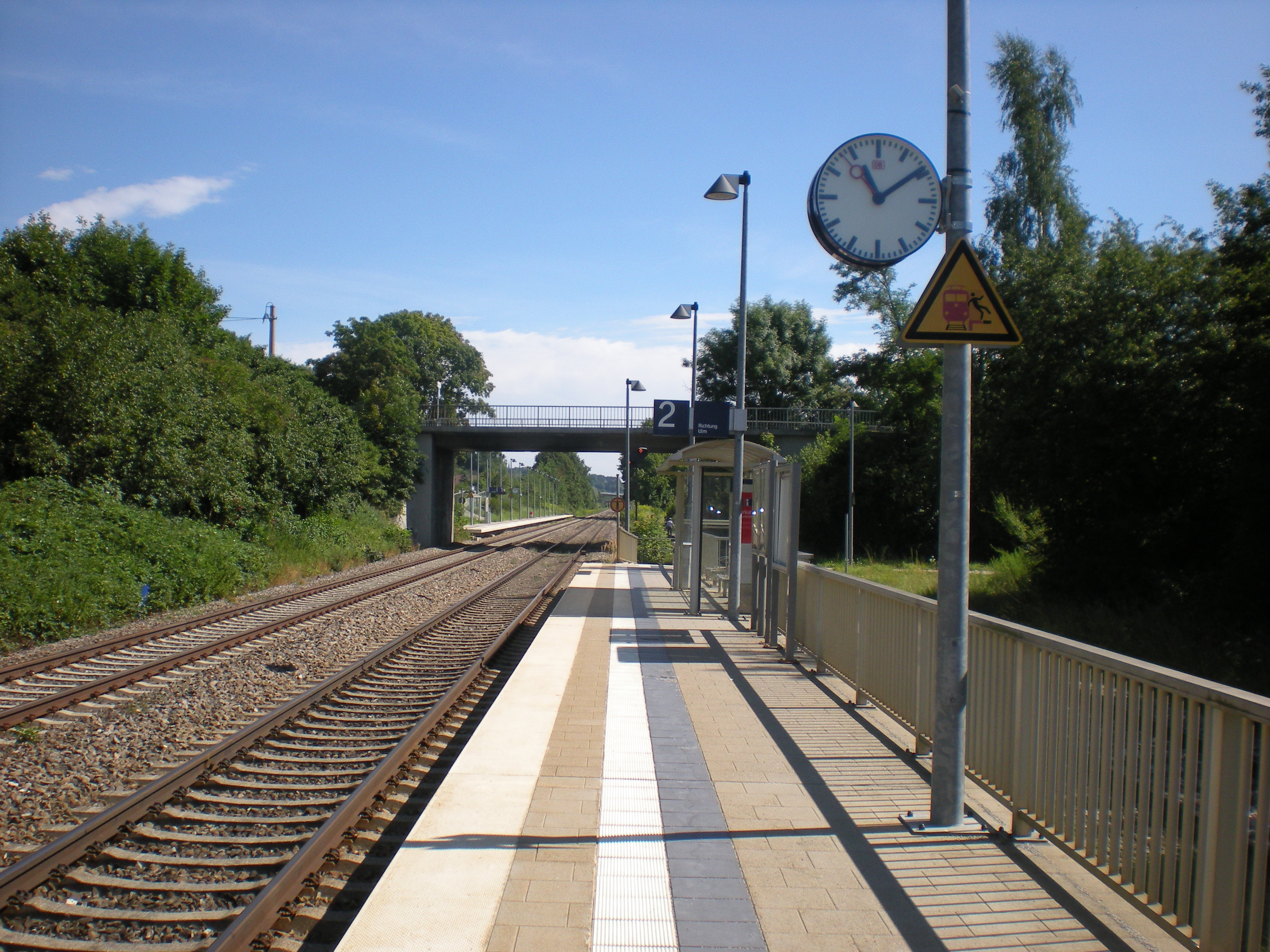
- 2012

General information
- Location: Nicolaus-Otto-Straße 2; 89079 Ulm; BW, Germany
- Coordinates: 48°21′59″N 9°56′25″E
- Elevation: 475 m (1,558 ft)
- Owner: DB Netz
- Operator: DB Station&Service
- Lines: Southern Railway (Württemberg) (KBS 751)
- Platforms: 2 side platforms
- Tracks: 2
- Train operators: DB Regio Baden-Württemberg

Other information
- Station code: 5734
- DS100 code: TUDT
- IBNR: 8005954
- Category: 6
- Fare zone: DING: 10 and 20
- Website: www.bahnhof.de

Services
Preceding station	DB Regio Baden-Württemberg	Following station
Ulm Hbf Terminus	RS 21	Erbach towards Biberach (Riß) Süd
Location

Ulm-Donautal station is a railway station in the south-western part of the town of Ulm, located in Baden-Württemberg, Germany.
