= Heidelberg-Altstadt station =

Railway station in Heidelberg, Germany

Heidelberg Altstadt
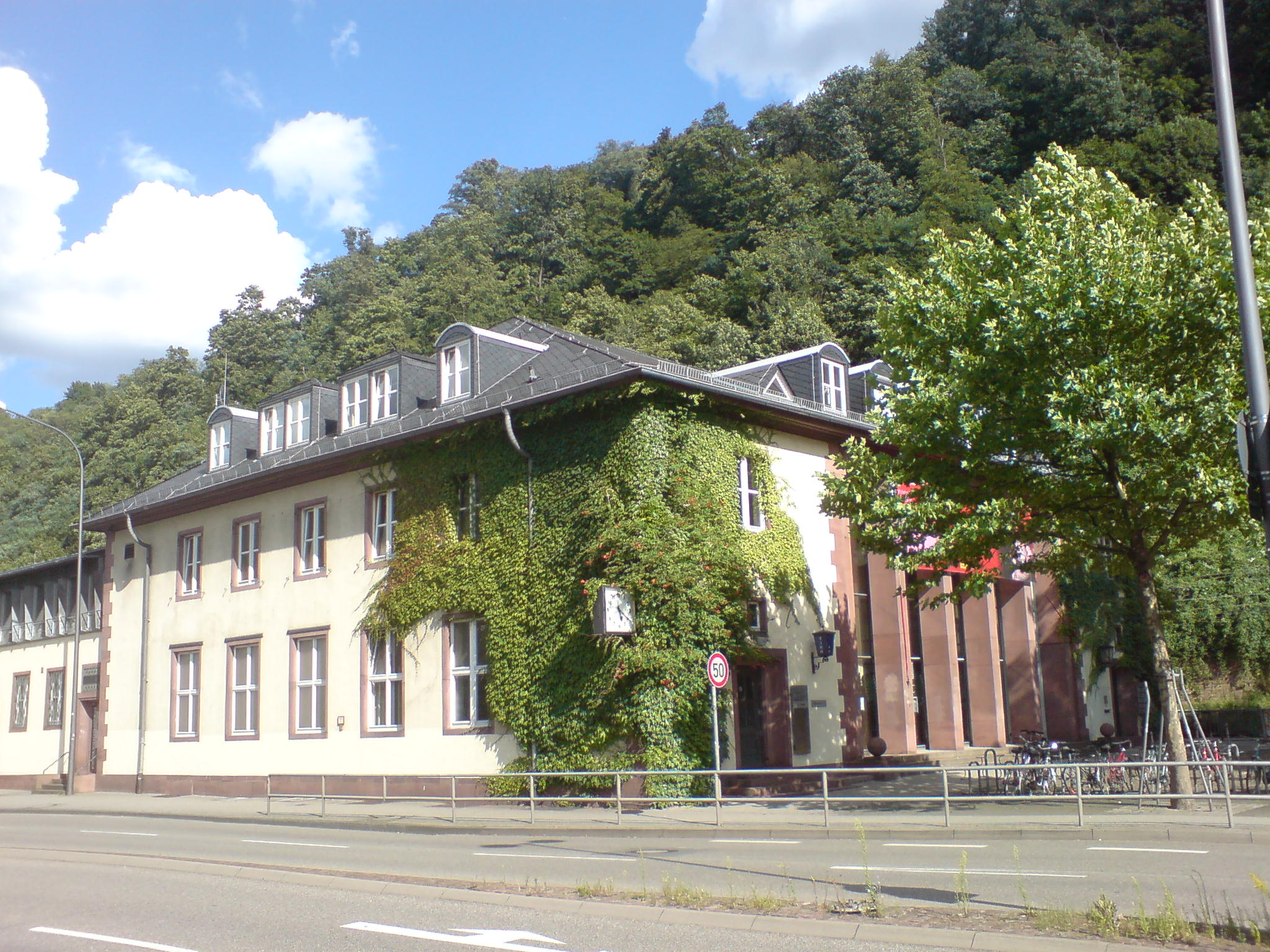
- The former station building

General information
- Location: Am Karlstor 1, Heidelberg, Baden-Württemberg; Germany
- Coordinates: 49°24′53″N 8°43′09″E
- Owner: Deutsche Bahn
- Operator: DB Netz; DB Station&Service
- Line: Neckar Valley Railway (km 22.1)
- Platforms: 2

Construction
- Accessible: Yes

Other information
- Station code: 2629
- DS100 code: RHKA
- IBNR: 8002685
- Category: 4
- Fare zone: VRN: 116 and 125
- Website: www.bahnhof.de

History
- Opened: 1872

Services
Preceding station	Rhine-Neckar S-Bahn	Following station
Heidelberg-Weststadt/Südstadt towards Homburg (Saar) Hbf	S1	Heidelberg-Schlierbach/Ziegelhausen towards Osterburken
Heidelberg-Weststadt/Südstadt towards Kaiserslautern Hbf	S2	Heidelberg-Schlierbach/Ziegelhausen towards Mosbach (Baden)
Heidelberg-Weststadt/Südstadt towards Heidelberg Hbf	S5	Heidelberg-Schlierbach/Ziegelhausen towards Eppingen or Bad Rappenau
Heidelberg-Weststadt/Südstadt towards Heidelberg Hbf	S51	Heidelberg-Schlierbach/Ziegelhausen towards Aglasterhausen
Location

Heidelberg-Altstadt station (also known as Karlstorbahnhof—"Karlstor station") is a station on the eastern edge of the old town of Heidelberg, Baden-Württemberg, Germany. Until 13 December 2008, the station was called Heidelberg Karlstor.

== Station building ==
The original station building was built on the Neckar Valley Railway (Neckartalbahn) in 1872 and 1873 at Karlstor ("Charles’ Gate"), a gate at the eastern end of the old town (Altstadt). The present station building is the result of a reconstruction between 1934 and 1936. The building is a heritage-listed building.

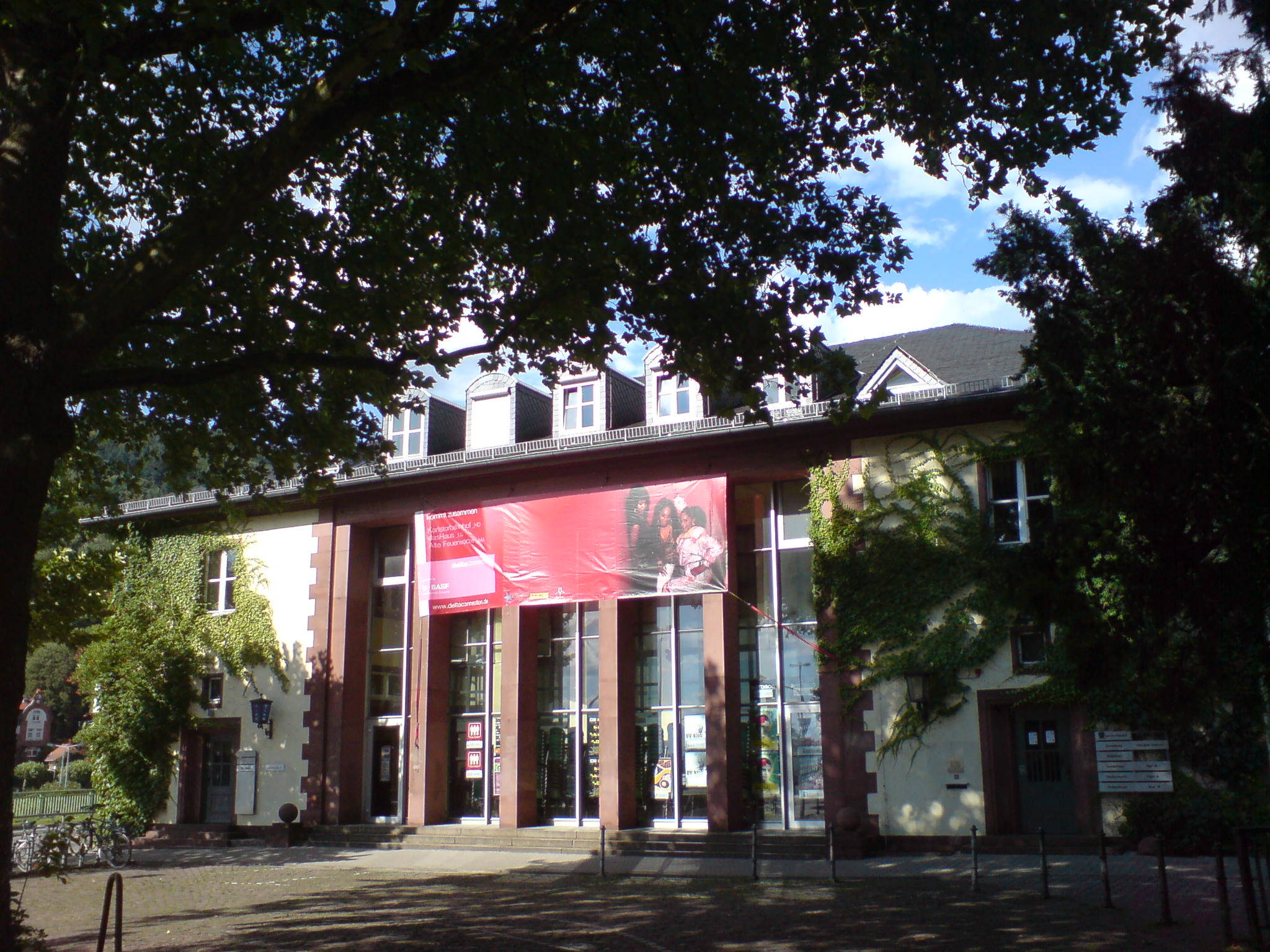
Kulturzentrum Karlstorbahnhof

In the meantime, it has been used as a municipal office building and, since 1995, it has housed the Kulturzentrum Karlstorbahnhof (“Karlstor station cultural centre”), which was established by Mayor Beate Weber. With a wide range of theatrical performances, concerts, readings and exhibitions and smaller festivals, it forms a significant part of the Heidelberg cultural landscape.

== Transport services ==
Since 2004, the station has been a stop on the Rhine-Neckar S-Bahn network and a new platform was built near the former station building for it. The station was given its present name, Heidelberg-Altstadt at the 2008/2009 timetable change on 14 December 2008.

Line	Route	Frequency
S1	Homburg (Saar) – Kaiserslautern – Neustadt (Weinstr) – Ludwigshafen (Rhein) – Mannheim – Heidelberg Hbf – Heidelberg-Altstadt – Eberbach – Mosbach (Baden) – Osterburken	Hourly
S2	Kaiserslautern – Neustadt (Weinstr) – Ludwigshafen (Rhein) – Mannheim – Heidelberg Hbf – Heidelberg-Altstadt – Eberbach – Mosbach (Baden)	Hourly
S5	Heidelberg Hbf – Heidelberg-Altstadt – Neckargemünd – Meckesheim – Sinsheim (Elsenz) – Eppingen	Hourly
S51	Heidelberg Hbf – Heidelberg-Altstadt – Neckargemünd – Meckesheim – Neckarbischofsheim Nord – Aglasterhausen	Hourly

=== Bus services ===
The station is served by several local bus routes.
