= Hoffenheim station =

Railway station in Sinsheim, Germany

Hoffenheim
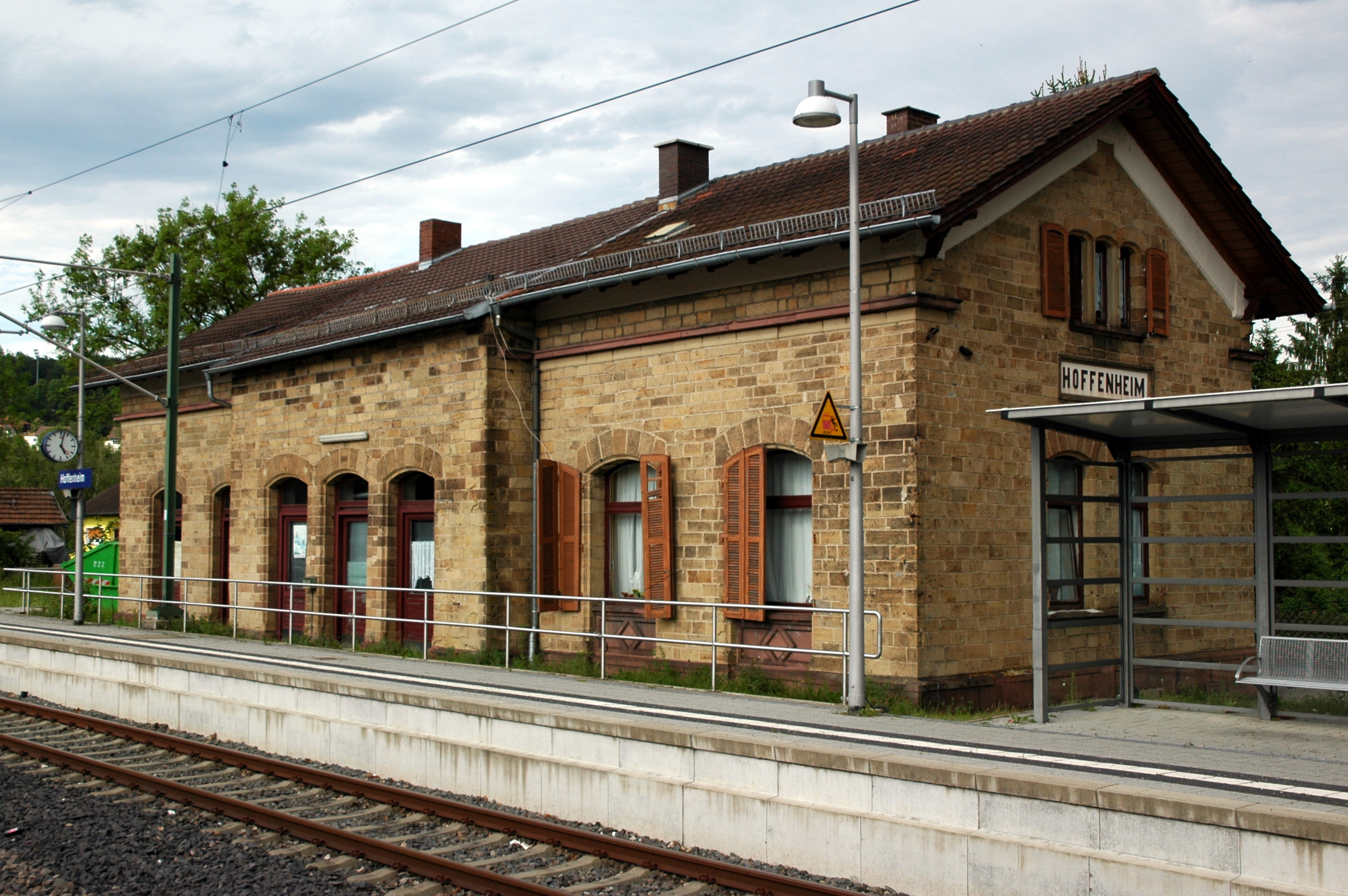
- 2016

General information
- Location: Eschelbacher Straße 18; 74889 Hoffenheim; Baden-Württemberg; Germany
- Coordinates: 49.2720°N 8.8386°E
- Elevation: 152 m (499 ft)
- System: Bf
- Owner: Deutsche Bahn
- Operator: DB Netz; DB Station&Service
- Lines: Elsenz Valley Railway (KBS 665.5)
- Platforms: 2 side platforms
- Tracks: 2
- Train operators: S-Bahn RheinNeckar
- Connections: S5; 762

Construction
- Parking: yes
- Cycle facilities: yes
- Accessible: yes

Other information
- Station code: 2823
- DS100 code: RHFF
- IBNR: 8002931
- Category: 6
- Fare zone: VRN: 166 and 186; HNV: 401 (VRN transitional tariff)
- Website: www.bahnhof.de

Services
Preceding station	Rhine-Neckar S-Bahn	Following station
Zuzenhausen towards Heidelberg Hbf	S5	Sinsheim (Elsenz) Hbf towards Eppingen or Bad Rappenau
Location
- Location within Baden-Württemberg Location within Germany Location within Europe

Hoffenheim station (German: Bahnhof Hoffenheim) is a railway station in the municipality of Hoffenheim, located in the Rhein-Neckar-Kreis in Baden-Württemberg, Germany.

== Location ==
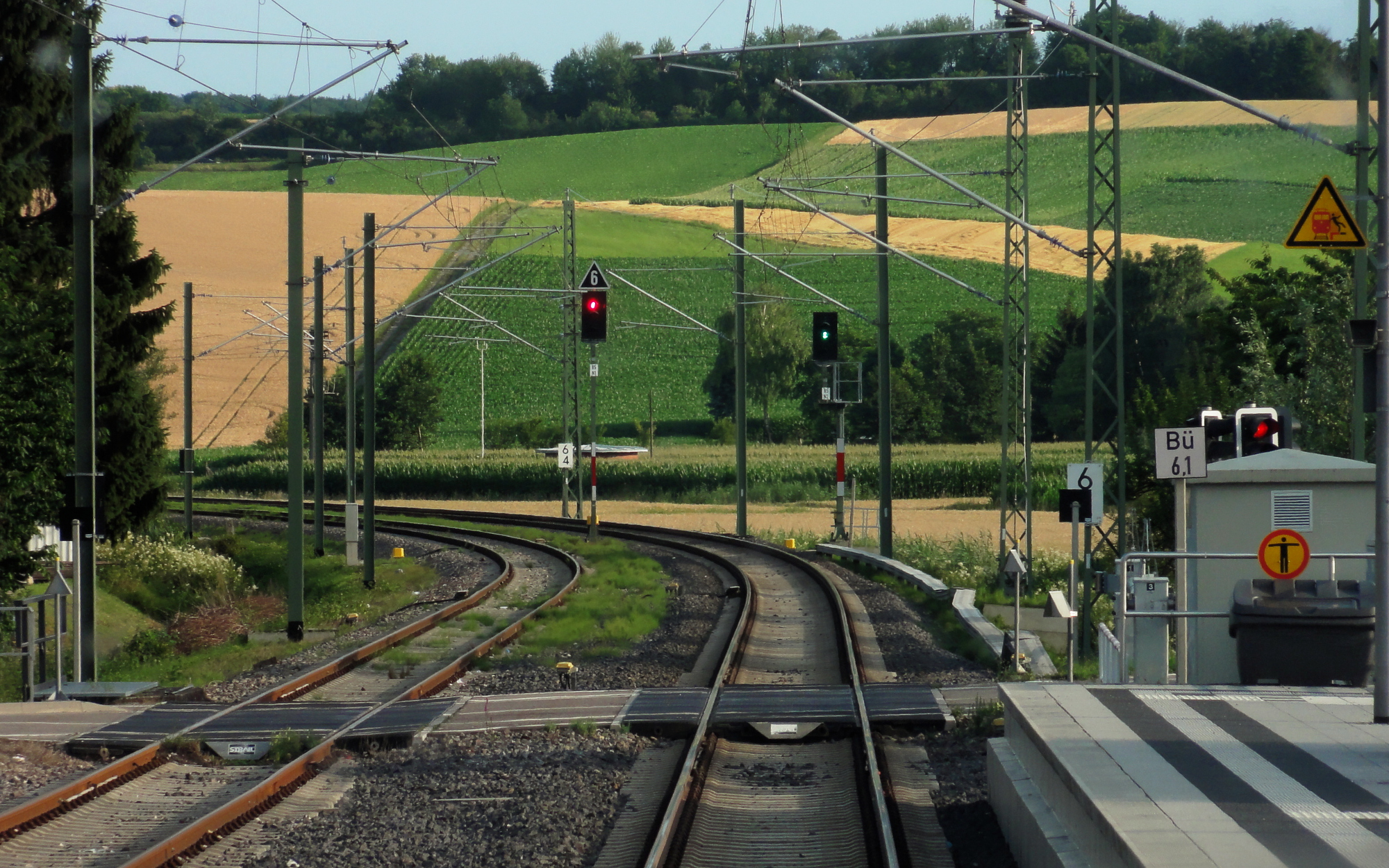
Southern station exit

The station is located west of the city centre, directly south of the platforms the Elsenz Valley Railway crosses the Eschelbacher Straße with a level crossing secured with half barriers with full closure.
