= DBAG Class 425 =

German electric passenger train

DBAG Class 425/435 and 426
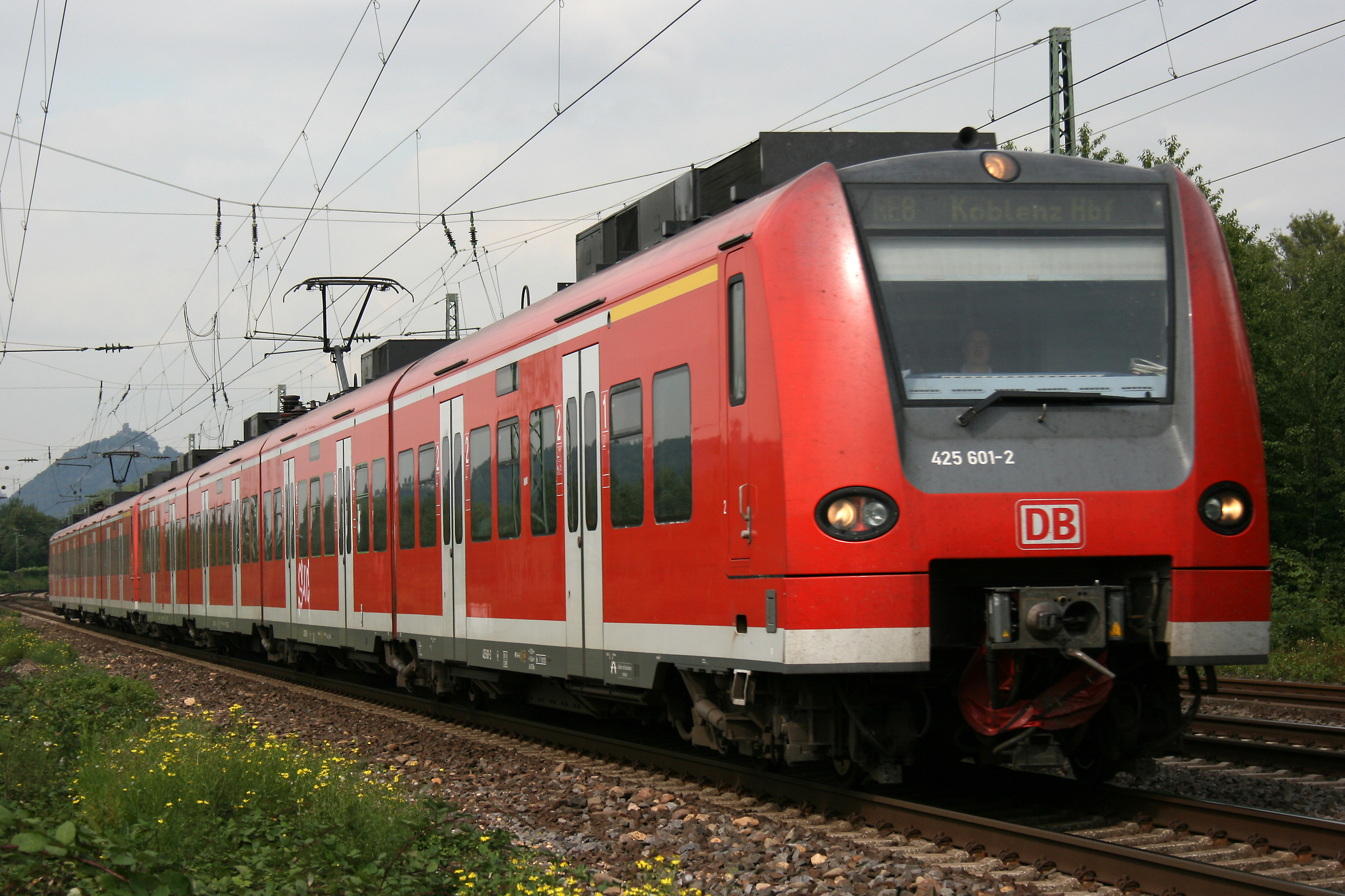
- Manufacturer: Bombardier, Siemens and DWA (consortium)
- Constructed: 1999 - 2008
- Number built: 249 / 43

Specifications
- Train length: 67.5 m (221 ft 5 in) / 36.49 m (119 ft 9 in)
- Wheel diameter: 850 mm (33.46 in)
- Wheelbase: Jacobs bogie: 2,700 mm (8 ft 10 5/16 in)
- Maximum speed: 160 km/h (99 mph)
- Weight: 114 t / 63.2 t (62.2 long tons; 69.7 short tons)
- Traction system: Electric
- Traction motors: 8 x 1TB1724 0GA02
- Power output: 425: 2,350 kW (3,150 hp) / 426: 1,175 kW (1,576 hp)
- Tractive effort: BR 425: 140 kN / BR 426: 70 kN
- Electric system(s): 15 kV 16.7 Hz AC (Germany) 25 kV 50 Hz AC (Malaysia)
- Current collection: Pantograph
- UIC classification: Bo'(Bo')(2')(Bo')Bo' resp. Bo'(A+A)'(2')(A+A)'Bo' (425) Bo'(2')Bo' (426)
- Track gauge: 1,435 mm (4 ft 8 1/2 in) standard gauge

Notes/references
- Class 425 nickname: "Quietschie"; Class 426 nickname: "Babyquietschie" and "Strawberry basket"

The Class 425 and Class 426 EMUs are a class of electric multiple units built by a consortium of Siemens, Bombardier and DWA, and are operated by DB Regio in Germany. They are essentially the same vehicle design, but the Class 425 EMU consists of four carriages, whereas the Class 426 EMUs only have two carriages.

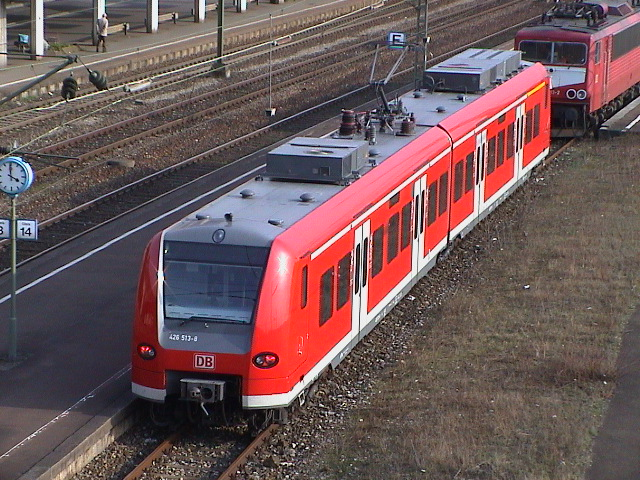
The class 426 is shorter than the class 425

The class 425 has been produced in HO scale by Brawa and N scale by Kato Precision Railroad Models.

== Description ==
It is a high-powered, light-weight vehicle with high acceleration for short- and medium-distance services with frequent stops. The aluminium superstructure was built as flat as possible, both to minimize drag and to ease automated cleaning. The acceleration is achieved by distributing traction motors among eight of the train's ten axles.

The Class 425 are similar to Deutsche Bahn's Class 424 and Class 423 trainsets.

A Class 425 unit consists of four cars that share three jacobs bogies and can only be separated at maintenance facilities. The inner two cars are designated as Class 435. A 425 unit typically consists of the following cars, where x is the unit's number:

- 425 x
- 435 x
- 435 (x+500)
- 425 (x+500)

e.g. 425 153 + 435 153 + 435 653 + 425 653. Different consists usually occur when the remains of partially destroyed units are combined to form one intact EMU.

== See also ==
- Express Rail Link, a Malaysian railway line which uses trains derived from the ET 425
- NS Sprinter Lighttrain, a Dutch regional train derived from the ET 425

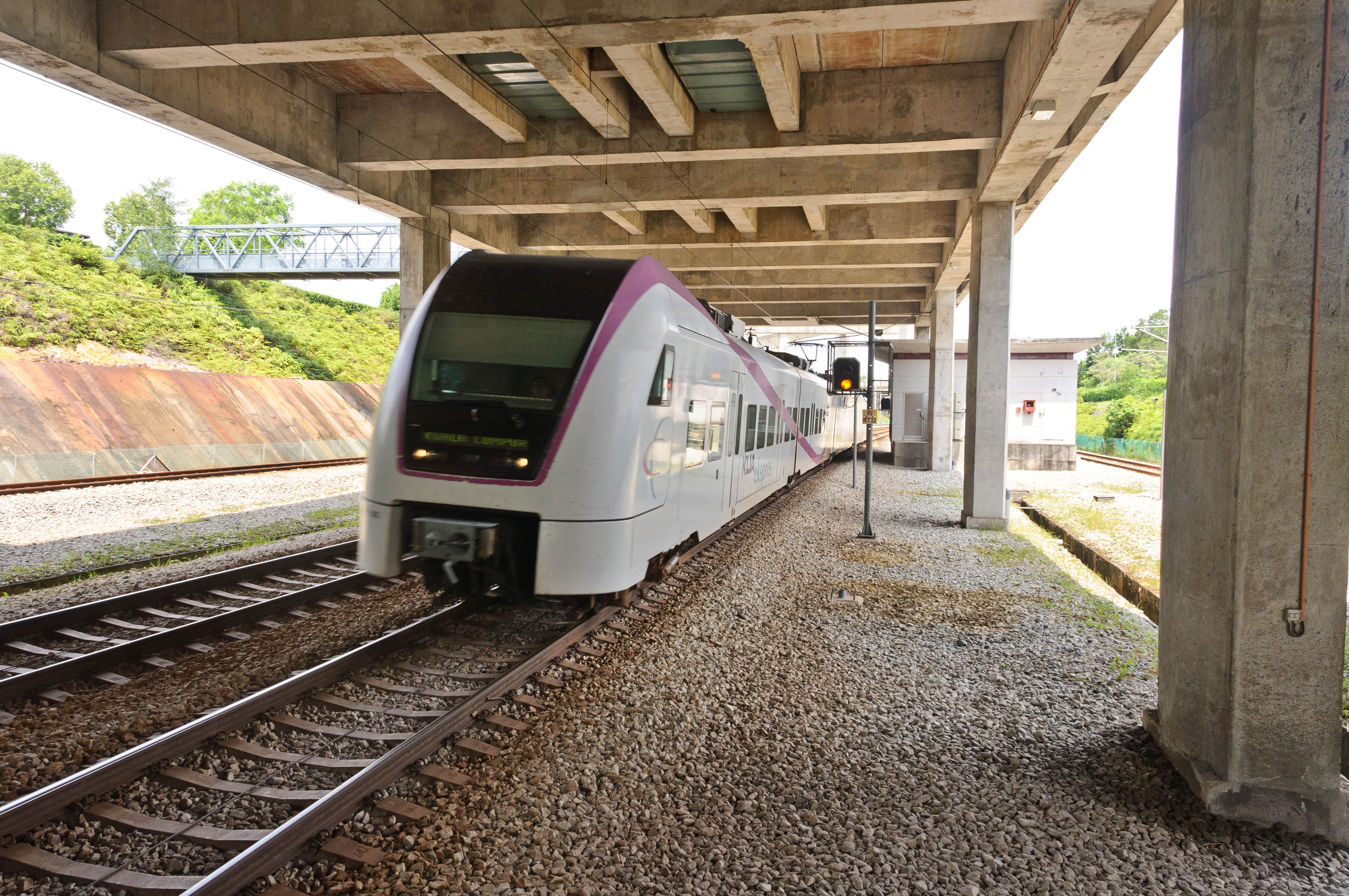
Similar trains in use on the Express Rail Link in Kuala Lumpur, Malaysia
