= Neuenburg (Baden) station =

Railway station in Neuenburg am Rhein, Germany

Neuenburg (Baden)
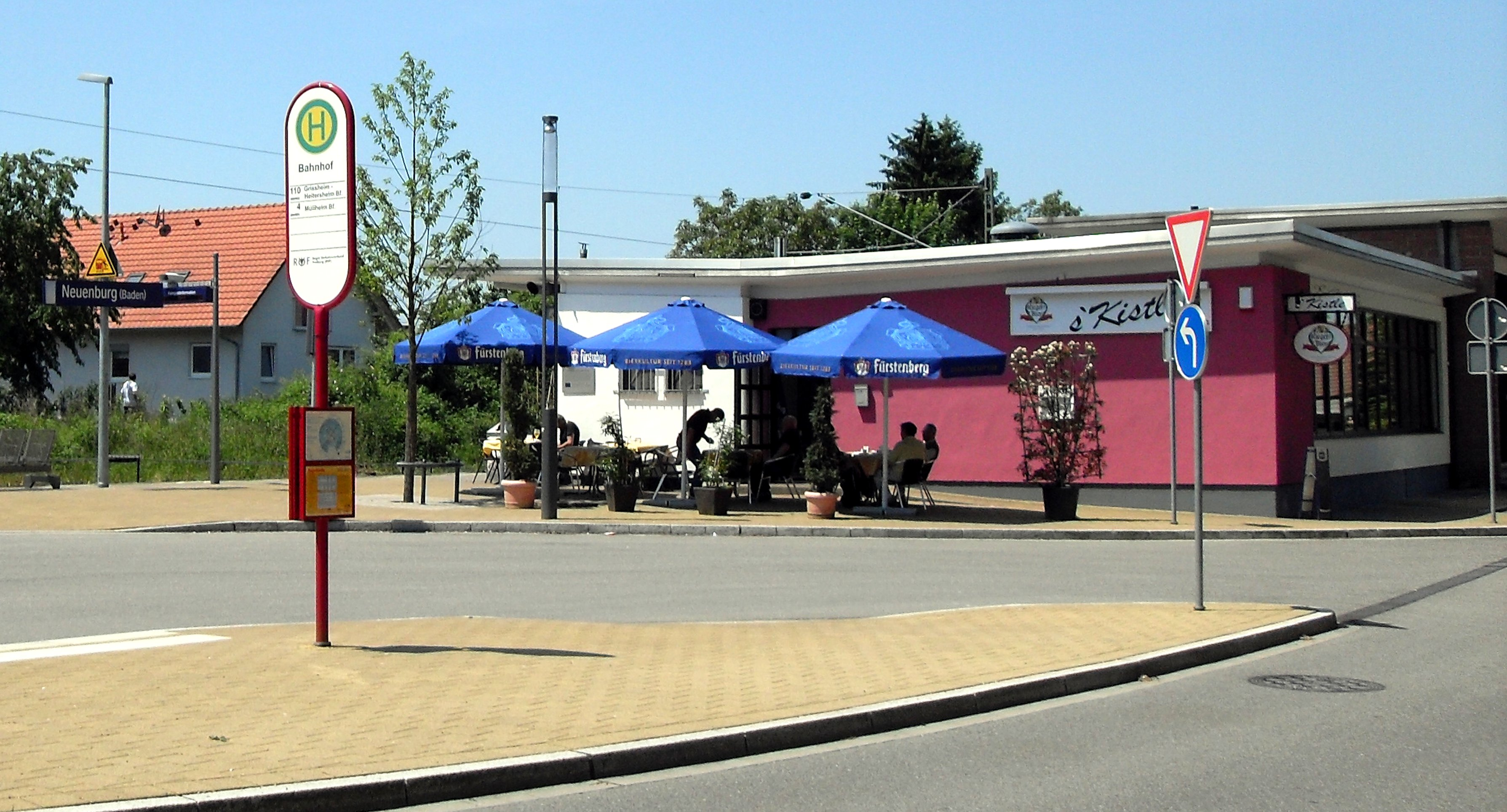
- View over the bus station to the railway station

General information
- Location: Beim Bahnhof 2, Neuenburg am Rhein, Baden-Württemberg; Germany
- Coordinates: 47°48′41″N 7°33′48″E
- Owner: Deutsche Bahn
- Operator: DB Netz; DB Station&Service
- Lines: Müllheim–Mulhouse railway (km 3.322) (KBS 703)
- Tracks: 1

Construction
- Accessible: Yes

Other information
- Station code: 7156
- DS100 code: RNBG
- IBNR: 8089119
- Category: 6
- Fare zone: RVF: C; RVL: RVF (RVF transitional tariff, stripe tickets only)
- Website: www.bahnhof.de

History
- Opened: 6 February 1878

Services
Preceding station	DB Regio Baden-Württemberg	Following station
Terminus	RB 27	Müllheim (Baden) towards Emmendingen
Bantzenheim towards Mulhouse-Ville	RB 28	Müllheim (Baden) towards Freiburg Hbf
Location

Neuenburg (Baden) station is a station in Neuenburg am Rhein in Baden-Württemberg, Germany. It lies on the single-track on the Müllheim–Mulhouse railway. Deutsche Bahn (DB) designates it as a class 6 station. The station lies on the border between Baden (Germany) and Alsace (France) and is served by DB and SNCF trains.

== Location ==
Neuenburg station is located on the southern outskirts of Neuenburg in an industrial area, a few metres from a small shopping centre. The national border between Germany and France is around 1.5 kilometres to the northwest. Its address is Beim Bahnhof 2.

== History ==
Neuenburg station was opened in 1878 as part of the construction of the Müllheim–Mülhausen railway. The nearby bridge over the Rhine at Chalampé was destroyed in the Second World War, but rebuilt after the war. International passenger traffic ended in the mid-1970s, but in the summer of 1975 there were still four train pairs between Mulhouse and Müllheim. Neuchatel was subsequently the terminus of a branch line from Müllheim, which had been electrified since May 1965. This section was also finally closed on 31 May 1980 and the station lost all passenger services.

After a feasibility study on the line found that it would have positive net benefits, special train services were resumed on selected Sundays and public holidays from 2006 onwards. The station has been served by regular services since the extension of the Offenburg–)Freiburg–Müllheim Regionalbahn service to Neuenburg at the 2010 annual timetable change. Up to seven additional services between Baden and Alsace were added each day on 9 December 2012.

== Rail services ==
Neuenburg is located in the area where rail services and fares are administered by Regio-Verkehrsverbund Freiburg (Freiburg regional transport association, RVF).

The station is served every two hours by Regionalbahn services on the Neuenburg–Freiburg(–Offenburg–Karlsruhe) route. Some additional services run on working days. Services are operated with Class 146 locomotives and double-deck coaches or class 111 locomotives and Silberling ("n-coaches").

In addition, up to seven train pairs on the Müllheim–Mulhouse route stop at the station every day, at least one train pair of which runs directly from/to Freiburg. These services are operated by French Alstom Coradia (classX 73900) diesel multiple units of TER Grand Est.

Train class	Route	Frequency
RB 27	(Karlsruhe –) Offenburg – Lahr (Schwarzw) – Emmendingen – Freiburg (Breisgau) – Ebringen – Schallstadt – Bad Krozingen – Heitersheim – Müllheim (Baden) – Neuenburg (Baden)	Hourly
RB 28/ TER	(Freiburg (Breisgau) –) Müllheim (Baden) – Neuenburg (Baden) – Bantzenheim – Mulhouse Ville	Every 2 hours

== Planning ==
After the completion of the third and fourth track on the Rhine Valley Railway, an S-Bahn operation would run hourly from Mulhouse via Müllheim and Freiburg to Sasbach according to the Breisgau S-Bahn 2020 concept.
