= Müllheim im Markgräflerland station =

Railway station in Müllheim, Germany

Müllheim im Markgräflerland
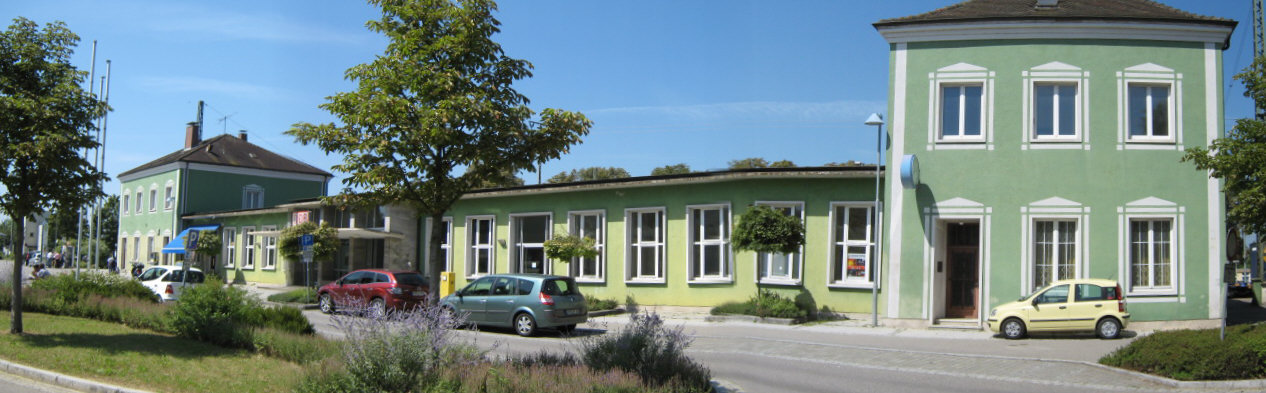
- Former entrance building, now demolished

General information
- Location: Bahnhofstr. 1, 79379, Müllheim, Baden-Württemberg; Germany
- Coordinates: 47°48′35″N 7°35′58″E
- Lines: Rhine Valley Railway (km 237.3); Müllheim–Mulhouse (km 0.0); Müllheim–Badenweiler (km 0.0) (closed)
- Tracks: 4

Construction
- Accessible: No

Other information
- Station code: 4223
- DS100 code: RML
- IBNR: 80004223
- Category: 4
- Fare zone: RVF: C; RVL: RVF (RVF transitional tariff, stripe tickets only)
- Website: www.bahnhof.de

History
- Opened: 1 June 1847

Services
Preceding station	DB Fernverkehr	Following station
Freiburg Hbf towards München Hbf	ICE 60	Weil am Rhein towards Basel SBB
Preceding station	DB Regio Baden-Württemberg	Following station
Heitersheim towards Karlsruhe Hbf	RE 7	Schliengen towards Basel Bad Bf
Buggingen towards Emmendingen	RB 27	Neuenburg (Baden) Terminus
Buggingen towards Emmendingen	RB 27	Auggen towards Basel Bad Bf
Freiburg Hbf Terminus	RB 28	Neuenburg (Baden) towards Mulhouse-Ville
Location

Müllheim im Markgräflerland station is a small railway junction in Müllheim in the German state of Baden-Württemberg, where the Müllheim–Mulhouse railway branches off the Mannheim–Karlsruhe–Basel railway (Rhine Valley Railway). From 1896 to 1955, the station was the terminus of the tramway-like Müllheim-Badenweiler railway.

== Location ==
Müllheim station is located on the southernmost portion of Rhine Valley Railway, about halfway between Freiburg and Basel. Its address is Bahnhofstrasse 1.

== History ==
=== Opening of Müllheim station and the Rhine Valley Railway ===
Müllheim station was opened on 1 June 1847, along with the Freiburg–Müllheim section of the Rhine Valley Railway, which connects Mannheim via Karlsruhe and Freiburg to Basel. About two weeks later, another section of the Rhine Valley Railway was opened to Schliengen and the whole line to Basel was finished in 1855.

On 17 July 1911, there was a derailment in Müllheim station as a result of speeding through a construction site, which was subject to a speed restriction. There were 14 dead and 32 injured. The train driver had fallen asleep and the subsequent enquiry considered the effects of alcohol on driving for the first time in Germany.

The Rhine Valley Railway was electrified through Müllheim station in 1955.

=== Development of the railway junction ===
==== Müllheim–Mulhouse railway ====
In 1865, there were the first petitions by some of the neighbouring communities to the Grand Duchy of Baden for the building of a railway from Müllheim to Mulhouse. The Baden government published an act on 30 March 1872 for "the creation of a railway from Müllheim to Neuenburg and possibly continuing to Mulhouse." Work began on the line in late 1876. The railway was opened in February 1878 to supply the area around Mulhouse with food and timber from the area around Müllheim.

The Neuenburg–Chalampé bridge over the Rhine was demolished on 12 October 1939 during the Second World War. Deutsche Reichsbahn rebuilt the bridge as a single track in 1940–1941. German troops destroyed it again during their retreat on 9 February 1945.

The branch line from Müllheim to Neuenburg am Rhein was electrified by May 1965.

From the summer of 1975 there were only four pairs of trains a day between Mulhouse and Müllheim Passenger services on the Müllheim–Neuenburg section were discontinued on 31 May 1980. However, the line remained open for freight traffic.

In October 1998, the Breisgau S-Bahn operated a special train with a Regio-Shuttle. Feasibility studies in the spring of 2004 showed that the line would have a favourable cost-benefit ratio. After a three-week trial operation, the opening ceremony was held for the resumption of passenger service on 27 August 2006. From 2006 to 2012, it was operated on certain Sundays and public holidays as a special event service. Since 9 December 2012, there are up to seven services daily between Baden and Alsace, with at least one pair of trains running directly to and from Freiburg Hauptbahnhof. Since then, a French X 73900 (called Baleine Bleue in French and Blauwal in German, meaning "blue whale") has been used.

==== Müllheim–Badenweiler railway ====
In 1894, the Müllheim–Badenweiler railway (Müllheim-Badenweiler Eisenbahn, MBE) was founded with a significant contribution from the railway construction and operating company, Vering & Waechter. Operations commenced as a steam-powered tramway on 15 February 1896. It was operated by Vering & Waechter until the German Railway Operating Company (Deutsche Eisenbahn-Betriebs-Gesellschaft, DEBG) took over the operational management in 1899. The steam trains were replaced on 7 April 1914 by electric vehicles, which were operated at 1000 Volts DC.

The state of Baden-Württemberg acquired the MBE on 1 March 1955 and the Central Baden Railways (Mittelbadischen Eisenbahnen) took over operations on 29 March 1955. It found that the railway was in very poor condition and that modernisation would not be affordable. It ended all rail traffic on 22 May 1955 and dismantled all track of the MBE by 1970. Apart from the station building in Badenweiler, all of the line's structures had disappeared by 2016. The station building was demolished in July 2022, so that high speed tracks could be built in its place for the Karlsruhe–Basel high-speed railway. The design of its replacement was still unclear at the end of 2021. As a temporary measure, a temporary structure built out of containers was installed in 2022.

== Platforms ==
Müllheim station has three platform tracks 3, 4 and 6, all of which are through tracks.

The southern dead-end track 5 also used to have a platform, but since its dismantling in 2024 it has only been used as a siding. To the west of track 6 is track 7, which has no platform and is used by freight, construction and empty trains as well as for parking vehicles. In the northern station area there is also overtaking track 15 to the west of the through tracks.

Two additional (high-speed) tracks are being built east of the existing tracks in the area of the former entrance building as part of the four-track upgrade of the Rhine Valley Railway; they will not have any platforms.

Platforms
Platform	Usable length	Platform height	Current use
3	245 m	55 cm	Services to Freiburg
4	245 m	55 cm	Services to Basel
6	245 m	55 cm	Local trains from/to Mulhouse and Neuchâtel and reversing trains from/to Fribourg

== Rail services ==
Müllheim is located in the fare zone of Regio-Verkehrsverbund Freiburg (Freiburg Regional Transport Association, RVF).

=== Long-distance services ===
Müllheim was served until the end of 1980s by regular night trains with coaches running to and from Copenhagen and Moscow. Since December 2013, Müllheim has been served by a daily InterCity service (the Baden-Kurier) on the route between Basel Bad and Munich.

Since August 2013 a pair of TGV services have run between Freiburg and Paris via Mulhouse, which made a technical stop in Müllheim until December 2015, but passengers were not able to embark or disembark. This technical stop became a scheduled stop in the 2015/2016 timetable, with effect from December 2015. Since then Müllheim has had a direct connection to and from Paris.

Intercity-Express trains stopped at Müllheim station every hour from April to October 2014 due to construction work on the old railway line between Schliengen and Efringen-Kirchen. The station was equipped with a 400-metre-long platform structure to compensate for the differences in height. This platform construction was removed in October 2014.

Line	Route	Frequency
ICE 60	Basel Bad – Müllheim (Baden) – Freiburg (Breisgau) – Offenburg – Karlsruhe – Stuttgart – Munich	One train pair

=== Regional services ===
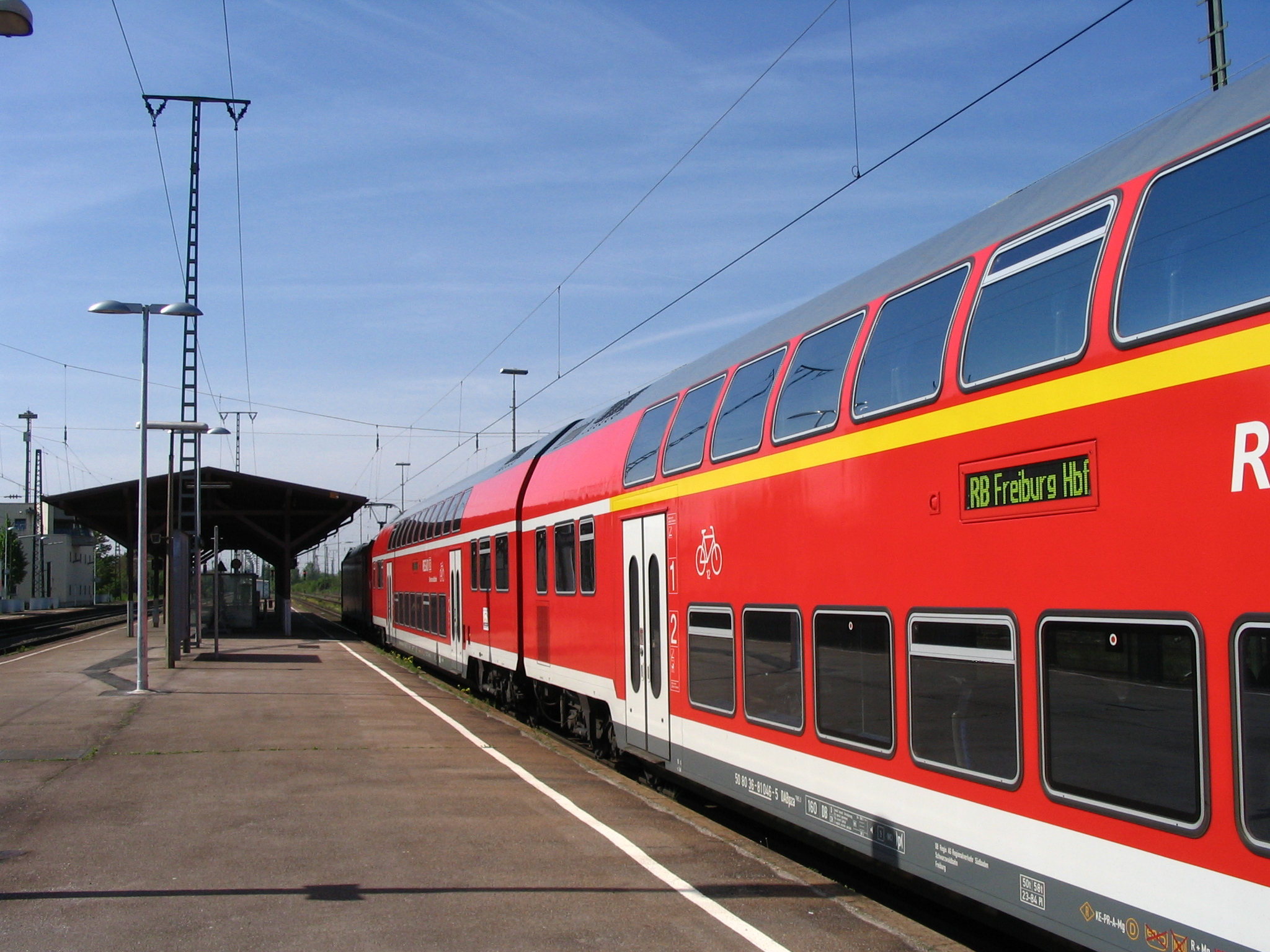
Regionalbahn service in Müllheim Station

All Regional-Express and Regionalbahn services between Offenburg or Freiburg and Basel Bad stop in Müllheim.

Since the beginning of the winter 2009/2010 timetable on 14 December 2009, the Regionalbahn services on the Freiburg–Müllheim route continue to Neuenburg. This provides a two-hour interval service on both Mondays to Fridays (with some gaps) as well as on weekends.

As of 9 December 2012, there are up to seven connections daily between Baden and Alsace, with at least one pair of trains running directly from/to Freiburg. These are usually performed with French X 73900 sets owned by TER Alsace and operated by Deutsche Bahn as Regionalbahn services.

Rail services in the 2022 timetable
Service	Route	Frequency	Platform
RE 7	(Karlsruhe –) Offenburg – Lahr (Schwarzw) – Emmendingen – Freiburg – Schallstadt – Bad Krozingen – Müllheim – Basel Bad (– Basel SBB)	Hourly	3 (towards Freiburg); 4 (towards Basel)
RB 26	Offenburg – Lahr (Schwarzw) – Emmendingen – Freiburg (Breisgau) – Ebringen (– Schallstadt – Bad Krozingen – Heitersheim – Müllheim – Neuenburg (Baden))	Hourly in the peak	6
RB 27	Basel Bad – Müllheim – Freiburg	Hourly	3 (towards Freiburg); 4 (towards Basel)
RB 27	(Freiburg) – Müllheim – Neuenburg	Hourly	6
RB 28	(Freiburg) – Müllheim – Neuenburg (Baden) – Bantzenheim – Mulhouse Ville	7 train pairs	5

== Planning ==
After the completion of the third and fourth tracks as part of the Karlsruhe–Basel high speed line, an hourly service from Mulhouse via Müllheim and Freiburg to Sasbach is envisaged under the Breisgau S-Bahn 2020 proposal.
