= Achern station =

Railway station in Achern, Germany

Achern
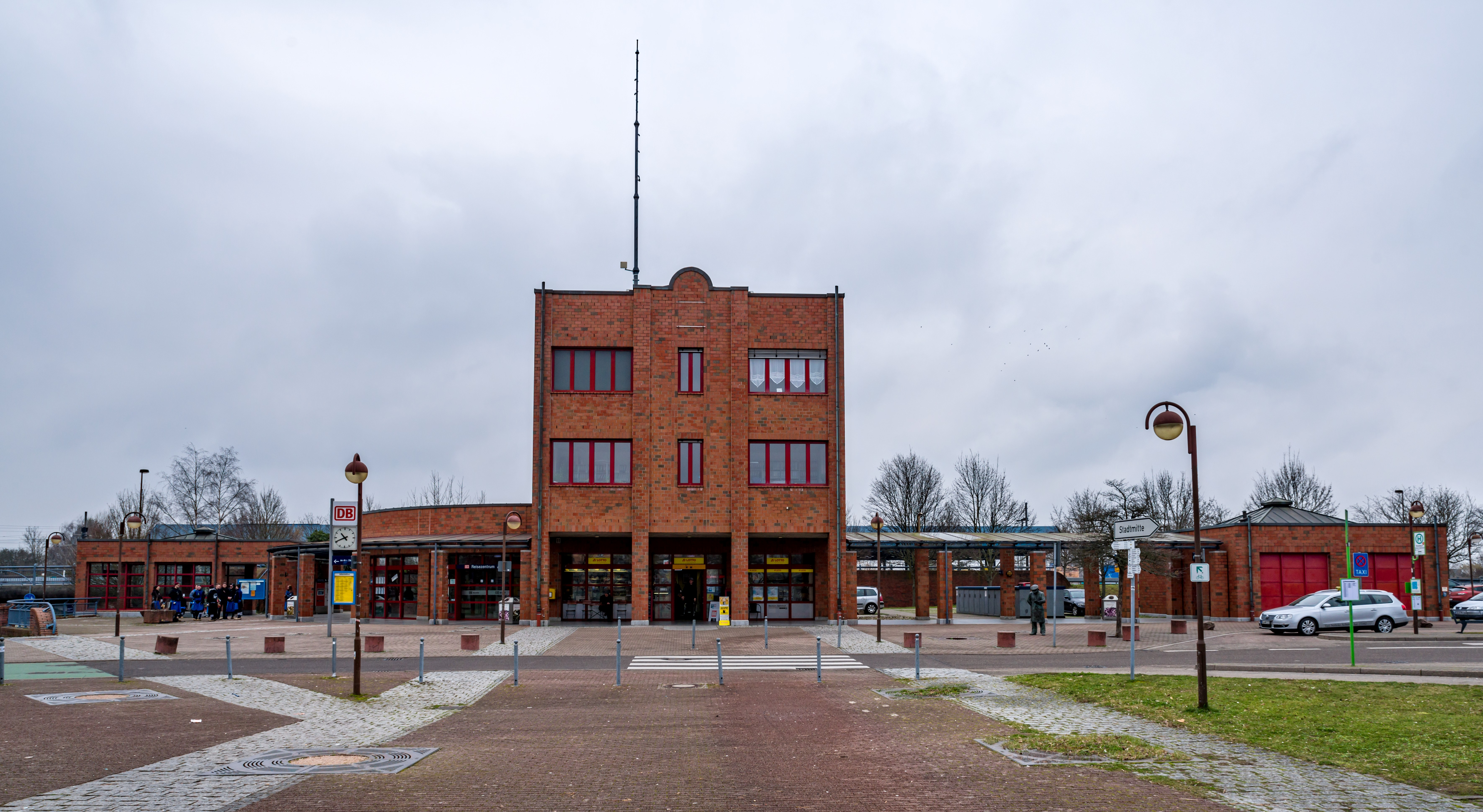

General information
- Location: Eisenbahnstr. 40, 77855 Achern, Baden-Württemberg; Germany
- Coordinates: 48°38′02″N 8°03′56″E
- Lines: Rhine Valley Railway (km 125.3); Acher Valley Railway (km 0.0)
- Tracks: 4

Other information
- Station code: 6
- DS100 code: RAH
- IBNR: 8000412
- Category: 4
- Fare zone: TGO: 3
- Website: www.bahnhof.de

History
- Opened: 1 June 1844

Services
Preceding station	DB Regio Mitte	Following station
Bühl (Baden) towards Karlsruhe Hbf	RB 44	Terminus
Preceding station	DB Regio Baden-Württemberg	Following station
Bühl (Baden) towards Karlsruhe Hbf	RE 2	Renchen towards Konstanz
Bühl (Baden) towards Karlsruhe Hbf	RE 7	Renchen towards Basel Bad Bf
Preceding station	(Offenburg)	Following station
Achern Stadt towards Ottenhöfen	RS 3	Renchen towards Offenburg
Preceding station	Karlsruhe Stadtbahn	Following station
Bühl (Baden) towards Karlsruhe Tullastraße/Alter Schlachthof	S 7	Terminus
Bühl (Baden) towards Karlsruhe Hbf	S 71	Terminus
Location

Achern station is the largest and most important of the four stations in the town of Achern in the German state of Baden-Württemberg. It is located at kilometre 125.3 of the Rhine Valley Railway (Rheintalbahn), which connects Mannheim and Basel and is the starting point of the Acher Valley Railway (Achertalbahn), which runs to Ottenhöfen. The station has four platforms and it is classified by Deutsche Bahn (DB) as a category 4 station. It has also been the terminus of lines S32 and S4 of the Karlsruhe Stadtbahn since December 2004.

== Location ==
Achern station is located on the northwestern edge of the town of Achern, about 0.7 km (0.43 mi) west of the town centre, at the southern edge of the Mittelmatten industrial estate. Bundesstraße 3 (federal highway 3) runs next to Achern station and the new Karlsruhe–Basel high speed line runs parallel to the Rhine Valley Railway past the station.

== History ==
On 11 June 1844, the Grand Duchy of Baden State Railway opened the Baden-Oos–Offenburg section of the Rhine Valley Railway running through Achern. A station was opened in Achern at the same time.

There were demands from the opening of the Rhine Valley Railway, especially in the middle of the 19th century, for a connection from the line to the factories based in the Acher valley (Achertal), which adjoins Achern. There were plans from 1889 to build a narrow gauge railway, which were not carried out.

Finally, in 1894, a railway committee (Bahnkomitee) was established, which now promoted a standard gauge railway from Achern via Oberachern and Kappelrodeck to Ottenhöfen im Schwarzwald. In mid-1895, the preparatory work for the Acher Valley Railway were completed and a year later final approval was given for its construction. On 1 September 1898, 45 years after the opening of the Rhine Valley Railway, the Acher Valley Railway was opened by Vering & Waechter, a railway construction and operating company, which became part of the German Railway Operating Company (Deutsche Eisenbahn-Betriebs-Gesellschaft or DEBG) on 1 April 1917. After its dissolution it was taken over by the Südwestdeutsche Verkehrs-Aktiengesellschaft (Southwest German Transport Company, SWEG).

Achern station was connected to the electric railway network, as the Rhine Valley Railway was electrified in 1957.

In the 1990s, the Rhine Valley Railway was straightened and it was moved about 100 metres to the west in the Achern area. The old station was abandoned and demolished and the current station was built on the new line. The Acher Valley Railway was extended to the new station.

From the commencement of the 2004/2005 timetable on 12 December 2005, line S4 of the Karlsruhe Stadtbahn, which had ended at Rastatt, was extended via Baden-Baden and Buhl to Achern. Since then Achern has been the southernmost station of the Karlsruhe Stadtbahn.

== Entrance building ==
The entrance building of Achern station was built in brick in the Rundbogenstil (Romanesque revival style) with terracotta ornaments. The newly built building has a DB travel agency and a Schmitt&Hahn book shop.

== Rail services ==
Achern station is a small railway junction in northern Ortenaukreis. In addition to the Deutsche Bahn regional services and the SWEG railcars on the Acher Valley Railway, services on lines S71 and S7 of the Karlsruhe Stadtbahn terminate here. On the station forecourt there is a bus station with six bus platforms that are served by regional buses, including the RVS Regionalbusverkehr Südwest regional bus route 7123, which runs via Kloster Allerheiligen to Oppenau station.

The SWEG railcars take 18 minutes to reach Ottenhöfen on the Acher Valley Railway. From 1968 until 2013, some steam train services ran in the summer timetable.

The Regional-Express and Interregio-Express services take about 30 minutes to reach Karlsruhe Hauptbahnhof. The Stadtbahn services take a little less than an hour. The S71 services, which are operated by the DB, run to the Hauptbahnhof, while the S7 services run via a connecting ramp at Albtalbahnhof to reach the station forecourt and then continue to Karlsruhe city. Every weekday

While the Stadtbahn services terminate in Achern, regional services run to the south through Offenburg, Hausach and Singen (Hohentwiel) to Konstanz.

== Fares ==
Achern and the entire Ortenaukreis district is in the fare zone of the Tarifverbund Ortenau GmbH (Ortenau fare association, TGO). For journeys to the area of the Karlsruher Verkehrsverbund (Karlsruhe transport association, KVV), a transition ticket must be bought. Moreover, the RegioX ticket of KVV can be used.
