= Sandbach (Acher) =

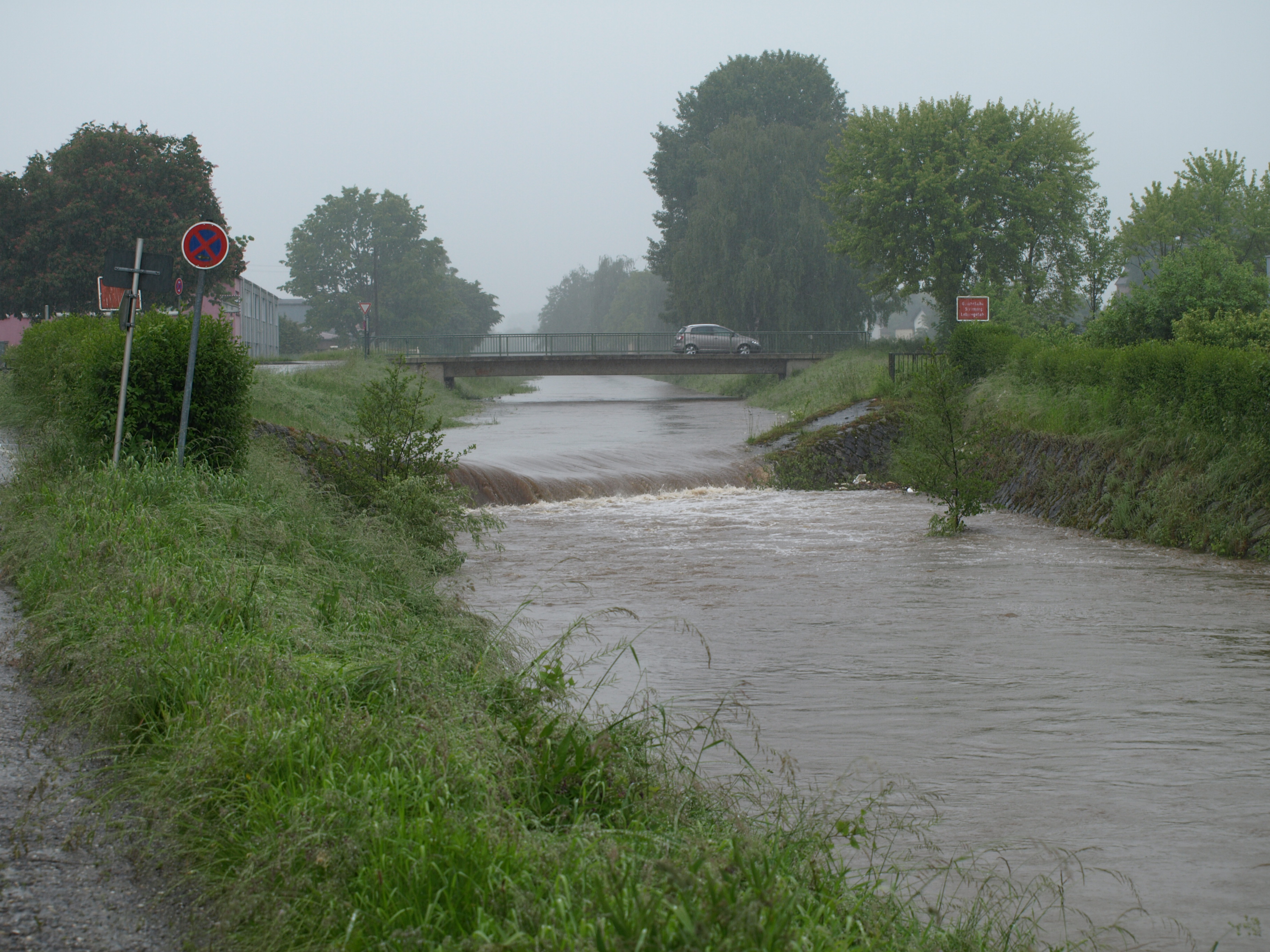
- The Sandbach in May 2013 in Vimbuch. Foreground: the Sandbach Flood Relief Canal

Location
- Country: Germany
- State: Baden-Württemberg
- District: Rastatt
- Municipality: Baden-Baden
- Reference no.: DE: 2357289

Physical characteristics
- Source
  - location: Near the Black Forest High Road (B500) between Hundseck and Unterstmatt
  - coordinates: 48°38′22″N 8°12′02″E
  - elevation: ca. 855 m above sea level (NN)
- Mouth
  - location: Near Iffezheim into the Acher
  - coordinates: 48°49′12″N 8°07′25″E
  - elevation: 116 m above sea level (NN)
- Length: 29.2 km (18.1 mi)

Basin features
- Progression: Acher→ Rhine→ North Sea
- Landmarks: Large towns: Bühl (Baden), Baden-Baden; Villages: Bühlertal, Sinzheim, Iffezheim
- Tributaries
  - left: Grünebächle, Eichwaldbächle, Grautenbach, Kuhbach, Rohrgraben, Hardtgraben
  - right: Wiedenbach, Hirschbach, Liehenbach, Steinbach, Grünbach, Sinzheimer Dorfbach, Ooskanal

The Sandbach is a river in the districts of Rastatt and Baden-Baden in the German state of Baden-Württemberg. From its source it runs, initially as the Bühlot, northwestwards within the Northern Black Forest, then out onto the Upper Rhine Plain heading north-northeast at first before swinging northwest again to its confluence. Its mouth lies 29.1 kilometres below its source near Iffezheim, where it discharges from the right into the lower reaches of the Acher which are known as the Altrheinzug ("Old Rhine Course").

== Geography ==
The source region of the Sandbach lies near the Black Forest High Road (B500) between Hundseck and Unterstmatt on the Hochkopf at a height of about 855 m above sea level (NN).

The Sandbach, in its upper reaches called the "Bühlot", flows steeply downhill in a northerly direction, meeting several small streams such as the „Rotwässerle. At its confluence with Wiedenbach, which joins from the direction of Sand and has a tributary, the Gertelbach on which are the Gertelbach Falls beloved of hikers, the Sandbach changes its direction to the northwest. Here it runs through the municipality of Bühlertal, where it is joined from the left by the streams of Grünebächle and Eichwaldbächle and, from the right, by the Liehenbach and other small brooks. In addition, in Bühlertal, it crosses the lake of Bühlot-Bad, named after the local name for the Sandbach.

In Altschweier the Sandbach turns in an arc and flows southwestwards to Bühl. From there it swings west again. At the town gardens in Bühl a small ditch branches off, the Kirchgaßgraben, which joins the river again later on. Shortly afterwards the stream passes under the Rhine Valley Railway. After crossing under another bridge, the river becomes known as the Sandbach. Behind the bridge bearing the B 3 the Sandbach turns towards the north in a wide bend and continues in a north-northeasterly direction.

In Vimbuch the Rittgraben, another ditch, branches off only to reunite with the Sandbach further downstream. The Sandbach Flood Channel (Sandbach-Flutkanal), which links the Sandbach to the Scheidgraben ditch, also branches off at Vimbach. In Weitenung, by contrast, two right-hand tributaries empty into the Sandbach, the Steinbach and the Grünbach, and a few kilometres further on, in Kartung, it is joined by the Sinzheimer Dorfbach. Shortly thereafter, where it meets the Oos Canal, that links it with the River Oos, and passes under the A 5 motorway, the Sandbach bends again and flows northwest. It runs in this direction for another 4.6 km, before discharging from the right into the Altrheinzug, the name of the lower reaches of the River Acher. Shortly before the confluence the Sandbach crosses over the Rhine Valley Canal.
