= Gamshurst =

- Borough of Achern
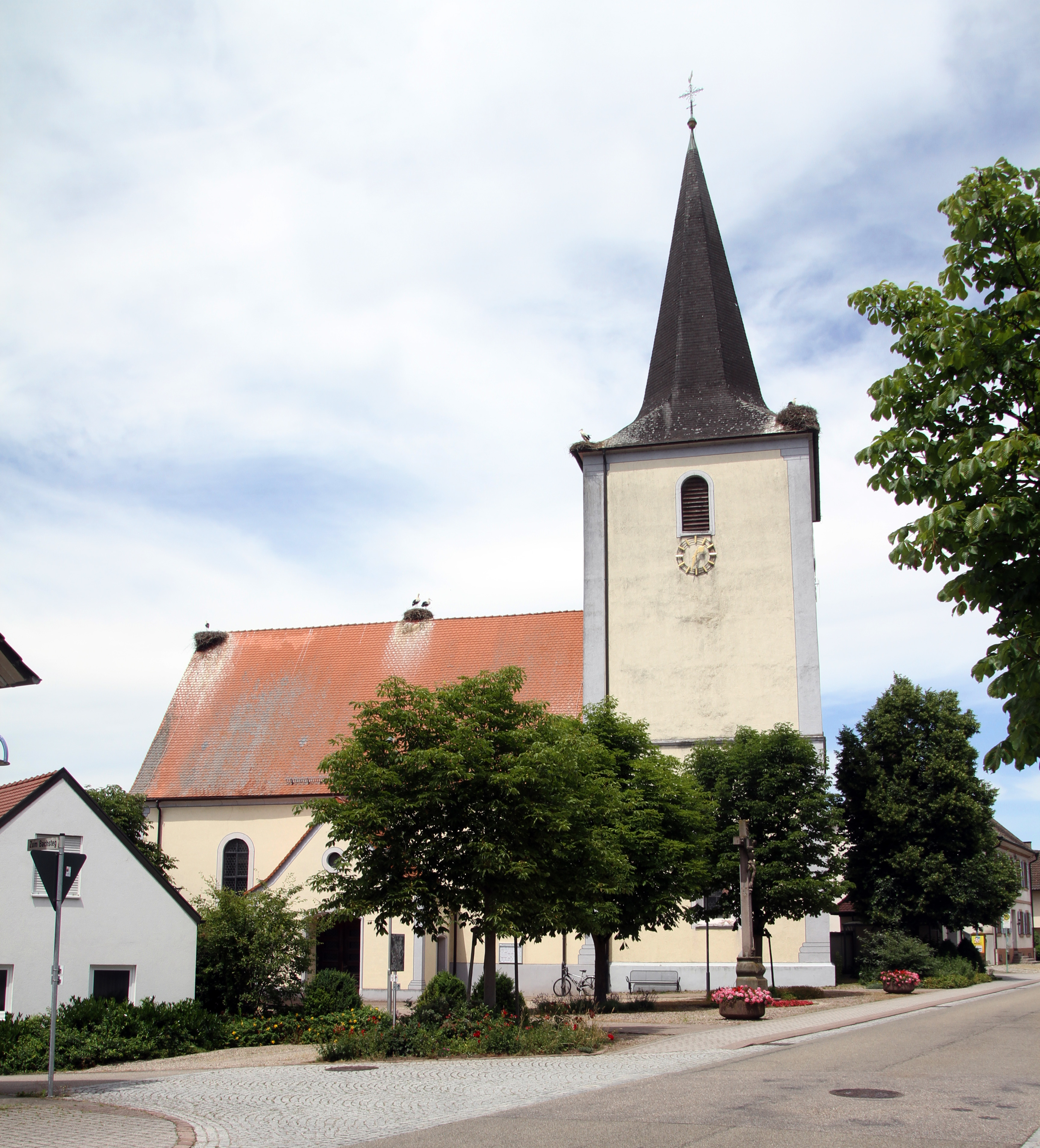
- St. Nikolaus

- Coat of arms
- Interactive map of Gamshurst
- Location within Germany Location within Baden-Württemberg
- Coordinates: 48°39′38.775″N 8°1′4.3962″E
- Country: Germany
- State: Baden-Württemberg
- Admin. region: Freiburg
- District: Ortenaukreis
- Town: Achern

Area
  - Total: 11.7 km^{2} (4.5 sq mi)
- Elevation: 130 m (430 ft)

Population (2013-12-31)
  - Total: 1,673
  - Density: 143/km^{2} (370/sq mi)
- Time zone: UTC+01:00 (CET)
  - Summer (DST): UTC+02:00 (CEST)
- Postal codes: 77855
- Dialling codes: 07841
- Website: Gamshurst Municipality

Gamshurst is a German neighborhood (Stadtteil) of the major district town (Große Kreisstadt) of Achern in the German state of Baden-Württemberg. First documented on February 21, 902, Gamshurst was originally the site of a Catholic monastery. The village of Gamshurst is originally mentioned in a Papal bull in 1216. From the 13th to the mid-20th century, Gamshurst was predominantly an agricultural village.

== History ==
Records from 1428 show that serfdom was abolished in Gamshurst at this time. In July 1675, during the Franco-Dutch War a French army led by General Turenne invaded and occupied the village. After departing Gamshurst, Turenne was killed in Sasbach by a cannonball on July 27, 1675.

== Geography ==
Gamshurst is located in northern Ortenaukreis, a district of Baden-Württemberg, in the northwest area of the city Achern. The village is close to the motorway exit no. 53 (Achern) of A5 and a few kilometers from the crossing of the Rhine Rheinau-Freistett and Gambsheim to France. The total area of Gamshurst is approximately 1,170 hectares. The Acher River (also called the Feldbach) runs through the whole village with about 3 km in length and predominantly along this small river has its origins.

== Crest ==
The Crest of Gamshurst consists of a split shield with three golden bishop balls that can be seen on a blue background on the left side. The right side shows a black Dreienberg plant on a silver background. The three golden balls are attributes of the Holy St. Nicholas, which are for money and gifts that the popular Nothelfer gave to the poor. The coat of arms comes from a recommendation of the General State Archives in January 1913 to adopt a crest that symbolizes the specific history, place, and name of Gamshurst.

== See also ==
- Achern
- Henri de la Tour d'Auvergne, Vicomte de Turenne

== Bibliography and further reading ==
- Longueville, Thomas (1907). Marshal Turenne. France: Longmans, Green, and Company. p. 384.
