= Achern =

- City
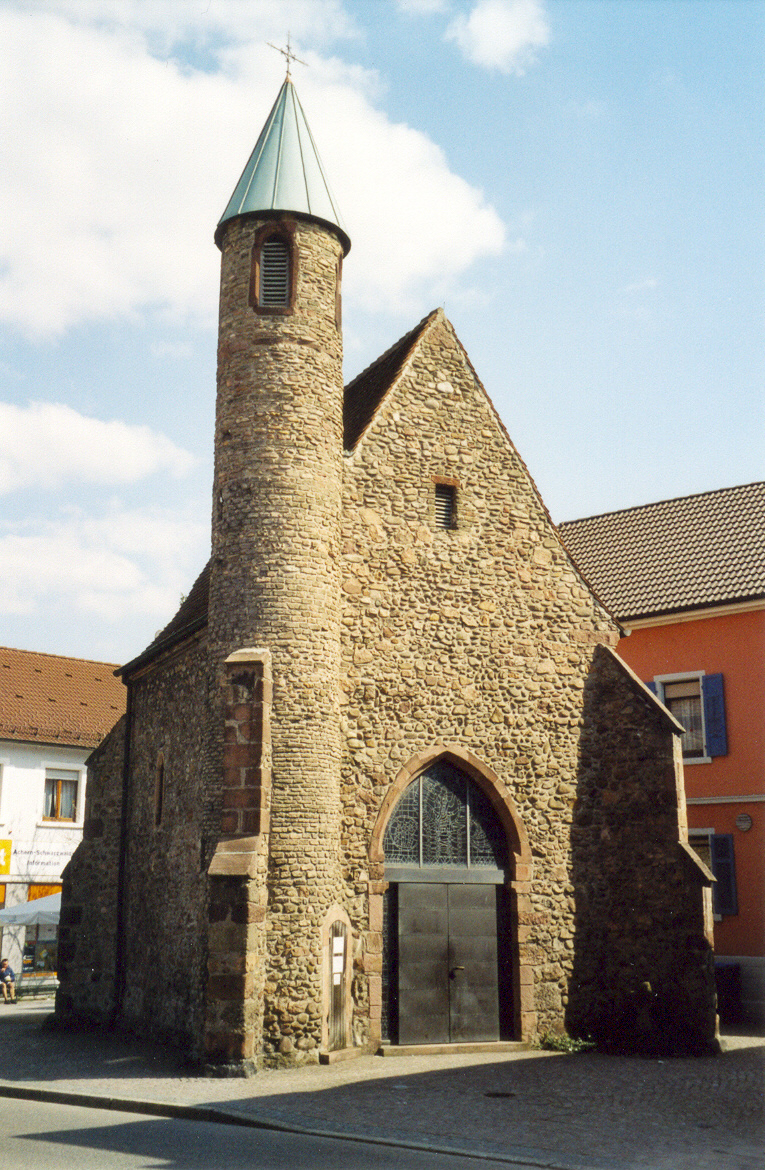
- Saint Nicholas Chapel

- Coat of arms

- Location of Achern within Ortenaukreis district
- Interactive map of Achern
- Location within Germany Location within Baden-Württemberg
- Coordinates: 48°38′N 8°4′E
- Country: Germany
- State: Baden-Württemberg
- Admin. region: Freiburg
- District: Ortenaukreis

Government
  - Mayor (2023–31): Manuel Tabor (CDU)

Area
  - Total: 65.24 km^{2} (25.19 sq mi)
- Elevation: 145 m (476 ft)

Population (2025-12-31)
  - Total: 26,873
  - Density: 411.9/km^{2} (1,067/sq mi)
- Time zone: UTC+01:00 (CET)
  - Summer (DST): UTC+02:00 (CEST)
- Postal codes: 77841–77855
- Dialling codes: 07841
- Vehicle registration: OG, BH, KEL, LR, WOL
- Website: www.achern.de

Achern (German pronunciation: [ˈaxɐn]; Low Alemannic: Achre) is a city in Western Baden-Württemberg, Germany. It is located approximately 18 km southwest of Baden-Baden and 19 km northeast of Offenburg. Achern is the fourth largest town in the district of Ortenau (Ortenaukreis), after Offenburg, Lahr / Black Forest and Kehl.

As subsequent to the district reform in the 1970s the population passed the 20,000 mark, Achern requested to be awarded the status of Große Kreisstadt. The status was granted by the State government effective January 1, 1974. Achern collaborates with the communities of Lauf, Sasbach, and Sasbachwalden in administrative matters.

Besides Achern itself, the municipality includes the boroughs of Fautenbach, Gamshurst, Großweier, Mösbach, Oberachern, Önsbach, Sasbachried and Wagshurst.

== Geography ==
=== Geographic location ===
Achern is located in the northern Black Forest near the Hornisgrinde, at the entrance to the Acher Valley and not far from the eastern edge of the Upper Rhine Valley. Coming from the Black Forest, the Acher enters the city from the southeast and passes Oberachern on its way to the center of town with the historic center, the Altstadt, situated on the right bank. The Acher then continues on in northwesterly direction between Fautenbach and Großweier and south of Gamshurst, before leaving the city to head for the Rhine. The river gave the city its name.

The city contains several artificially created lakes, some of which still produce gravel and sand. The largest lake is called Achernsee, near the Achern Autobahn ramp, in the West of the city.

=== Neighboring communities ===
Achern is surrounded by the following communities (starting clockwise from the north): Lichtenau and Ottersweier (both Rastatt District), as well as Sasbach (Ortenau), Lauf (Baden), Sasbachwalden, Kappelrodeck, Renchen, and Rheinau (Baden), all part of Ortenau District.

=== City boroughs ===
Within the municipal borders of Achern, the city is made up of the city center (Kernstadt), and the boroughs that were redistricted into Achern during the District Reform in the 1970s, namely, Fautenbach, Gamshurst, Großweier, Mösbach, Oberachern, Önsbach, Sasbachried and Wagshurst.

Except Oberachern, the districts also have community status under state administrative law, which entitles them to a borough council, elected by registered voters in municipal elections. The district councils are headed up by the district mayor.

In some cases, named neighborhoods or developments are part of the boroughs, though often with few residents and not clearly defined limits. Examples of such neighborhoods are Litzloch, Michelbuch and Ziegelhütte in Gamshurst, Malghurst in Sasbachried, Lindenhof in Fautenbach and Schollenhof in Wagshurst.

== History ==
Achern was first mentioned in 1095 as Acchara and developed later into Oberachern and Niederachern. Eventually, Niederachern was referred to only as Achern. During the High Middle Ages the town became part of the German Reich, courtesy of the Staufenberger and Zähringer families, and was included in the Landsvogtei of Ortenau. In 1334, together with Ortenau Achern became part of Baden, in 1351 it went to Strasbourg, in 1405 to the Electorate of the Palatinate, and in 1504 to Fürstenberg-Fürstenberg. In 1551 the town became part of Further Austria and part of the Reichlandsvogtei Ortenau. In 1495 and then again in 1637 Achern burned to the ground and was uninhabited for several years thereafter.

In 1805 Achern again became part of what was then the Grand Duchy of Baden and was made a district court seat. In 1808 it was awarded town status. In 1924 the district of Achern was dissolved and became part of the district of Bühl which was awarded District status in 1939.

After World War II, Bühl District was part of the State of Baden and from 1952 part of the Regierungsbezirk of South Baden. Pursuant to the district reform Bühl District was dissolved, effective January 1, 1973. Its southern part — and with it the city of Achern — was made part of the newly created Ortenaukreis.

=== History of the boroughs ===
The boroughs all came under the rule of Baden in 1805 largely as part of the district of Achern. Exceptions are Mösbach, which first belonged to the district of Oberkirch and was joined into the Achern district in 1859, and Wagshurst, which first belonged to the district of Appenweier and became part of the Achern district in 1819. When the district of Achern was dissolved in 1924, all of its communities except Wagshurst were joined with the district, and in 1939, District of Bühl. Wagshurst became part of the District of Kehl.

- Fautenbach was first mentioned circa 1100 as Vultenbach. Via the cloister in Hirsau it gained Großweier und Schauenburg.
- Gamshurst was first mentioned in 902 as Hurst des Gaman and was an expansion of Sasbach.
- Großweier was first mentioned around 1115 as Crosvvilare. It remained Croschweier well into the 19th century. Like Gamshurst it was an expansion of Sasbach. Großweier had been given to a family as a fief by the Duke of Baden. That vassal family lived in and took its name from the castle in town. When the last of the vassal family died, Großweier became the property of the Lords of Seldeneck whose kin sold it back to Baden in 1583. The moated castle was then the seat of the district court until it was moved to Bühl after the castle's destruction in 1689 by French troops during the Nine Years' War.
- Mösbach was first mentioned in 1386 as Mestbach. It belonged to Strasbourg before it became part of Baden.
- Oberachern was first mentioned in 1347 as Obernacher. Before that date no distinction was made between Oberachern and Niederachern. It belonged to the Staufenberg family as early as 1100 though parts of it belonged to the cloister in Hirsau. Before 1130 Oberachern belonged to the cloister St. Georgen. In the 12th century a noble and free family who apparently also supplied the judges for Achern, named itself after the city. This family lived in a moated castle the remains of which were later used in the construction of the Stephanus church tower in Oberachern. While Oberachern was part of the district court Achern und as such shared in Achern's luck, it had always been an independent village until it was annexed in 1971.
- Önsbach was first mentioned in the 13th century as Ongisbach. The cloisters in Honau, Ettenheim and Allerheiligen all owned property in the village. The village was part of the district of Achern.
- Sasbachried was first mentioned in 1697 as aus dem Rieth. It grew out of Sasbach and, like Sasbach, it used to belong to Strasbourg. In the 19th century, Sasbachried split from Sasbach and became an independent community.
- Wagshurst was first mentioned in 1136 as Wageshurst. It too belonged to Strasbourg and was part of the district court of Ulm.

=== Religions ===
In the beginning Achern was part of the diocese of Strasbourg. As a consequence of its belonging to Further Austria, the Reformation did not take hold. Achern and its surrounding area therefore remained almost exclusively Catholic throughout the centuries. In 1803 the communities were joined with the diocese of Konstanz before it became part of the newly created archdiocese of Freiburg in 1821 through 1827. The villages then belonged to the district of Ottersweier but in 1929 Achern became its own district with the Catholic city church (Stadtkirche) as its seat. Additional Catholic communities, whose churches were elevated to parishes early on, exist in almost all boroughs. Only Mösbach didn't become a parish until 1865 and Sasbachried is still serviced by the neighboring parish of Sasbach. All parishes now belong to the Acher-Renchtal district within the archdiocese of Freiburg.

At the dawn of the 19th century, Protestants started to move into Achern. The first Protestant service was held in 1842 in the Illenau hospital. The Protestant parish of Achern, founded in 1892, was able to build its church, the Christuskirche, in 1908 and 1909. The Protestant parish also serves the boroughs of Oberachern, Fautenbach, Gamshurst, Großweier and Sasbachried as well as the neighboring towns of Sasbach, Obersasbach and Lauf. The boroughs of Önsbach, Mösbach and Wagshurst on the other hand, are part of the parish of Renchen. The Protestant parish of Achern first belonged to the district of Rheinbischofsheim, and later on to the districts of Baden-Baden and Rastatt. The parish of Renchen belongs to the district of Kehl within the Evangelical Church in Baden. Finally, the Josua-Christian parish and the Christian parish Sasbachried are the two independent churches in Achern.

Also represented in Achern, though in smaller numbers, are Muslims, Jehovah's Witnesses, New Apostolic Church, and Seventh-day Adventists.

=== District reform ===
The following villages and areas were incorporated into the city of Achern:

- January 1, 1971: Oberachern
- January 1, 1973: Fautenbach, Gamshurst, Großweier, Mösbach, Önsbach, Sasbachried und Wagshurst

=== Demographics ===
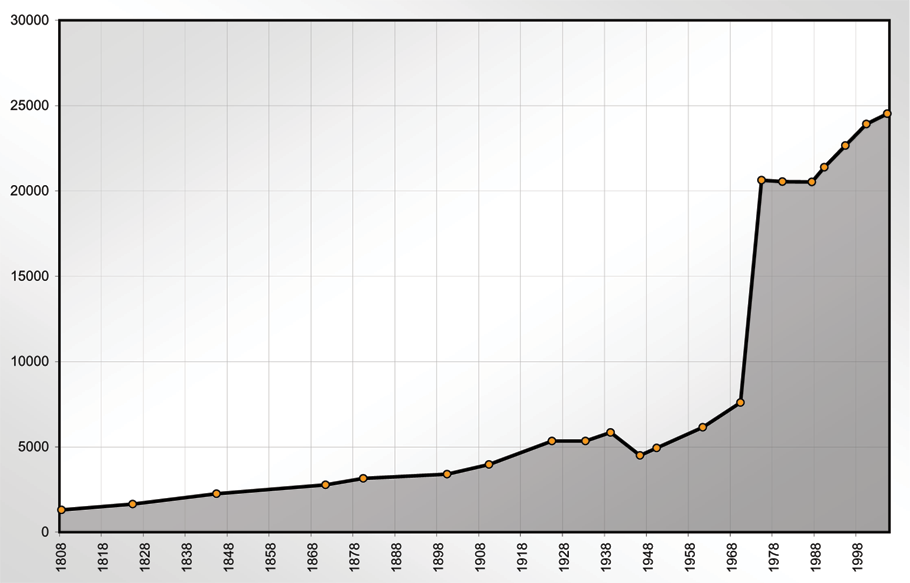
Achern demographics

Figures reflect the city limits at the time and are estimates or Census data (¹), or official extensions thereof, counting only primary residences.

Year	Population
1808	1,300
1825	1,638
1845	2,242
December 1, 1871	2,767
December 1, 1880 ¹	3,145
December 1, 1900 ¹	3,396
December 1, 1910 ¹	3,962
June 16, 1925 ¹	5,335
June 16, 1933 ¹	5,338
May 17, 1939 ¹	5,835
1946 ¹	4,492

Year	Population
September 13, 1950 ¹	4,932
June 6, 1961 ¹	6,141
May 27, 1970 ¹	7,596
December 31, 1975	20,621
December 31, 1980	20,543
May 27, 1987 ¹	20,524
December 31, 1990	21,382
December 31, 1995	22,658
December 31, 2000	23,911
March 31, 2005	24,521

¹ Census result

== Government ==
=== City Council ===
The municipal elections on June 13, 2004, resulted in the following make-up of the City Council:

CDU	8 Seats
Independents	7 Seats
ABL	5 Seats
UGA	4 Seats
SPD	2 Seats

Elections in May 2014:

- SPD: 2 seats
- Free voters Germany: 8 seats
- Acherner Bürger Liste (Citizen list) (ABL): 6 seats
- FDP: 1 seat
- CDU: 9 seats
- Total: 26 seats

=== Mayor ===
Heading up the village of Achern was the Heimburge (later: Bürgermeister or mayor) and the Bauernzwölfer. Since becoming part of Baden, the Mayor and City Council attend to Achern's local administration. The mayor is elected for a period of 8 years in direct elections. The mayor is also the City Council President. The First Councilman or woman is given the additional role of Deputy Mayor.

==== Mayors since 1905 ====
- 1905–1933: Wilhelm Schechter
- 1933–1945: Richard Krämer
- 1945–1955: Wendelin Morgenthaler
- 1955–1963: Richard Krämer
- 1963–1991: Winfried Rosenfelder
- 1991–2007: Reinhart Köstlin
- 2007–2023: Klaus Muttach
- 2023–present: Manuel Tabor

=== Flag and coat of arms ===
Achern's coat of arms shows a split shield in the front, on golden background half a black eagle with red tipped wings, and in the back a silver beam on red background. Achern's flag is red-white-red.

The coat of arms has been in use for a long time. The eagle was the symbol of the district court and appears in the seals of the court as early as 1415. When the district was lost to Austria the white beam was added to the seal. The seal later served as the foundation for the coat of arms which is in use to this day.

== People, culture and architecture ==
=== Theater ===
Achern is home to the Illenau Theater Achern e. V., a private theater company.

=== Museums ===
The Sensen-Heimat-Stadtmuseum Achern features an original scythe manufacturing facility. Displays also show the history of cutting tools from the Bronze Age through the present. In addition there is an exhibit covering Achern's local history.

=== Buildings ===
The St. Nikolaus Chapel, also called "Klauskirchl", is the symbol of the city. It was built around 1300 and features a round corner tower. The main church in the city, it is a Catholic church, built in 1824 and designed in the Weinbrenner style. Its predecessor was a Chapel of Mary, that was promoted in 1489 to Kaplanei and then again in 1535 to parish.

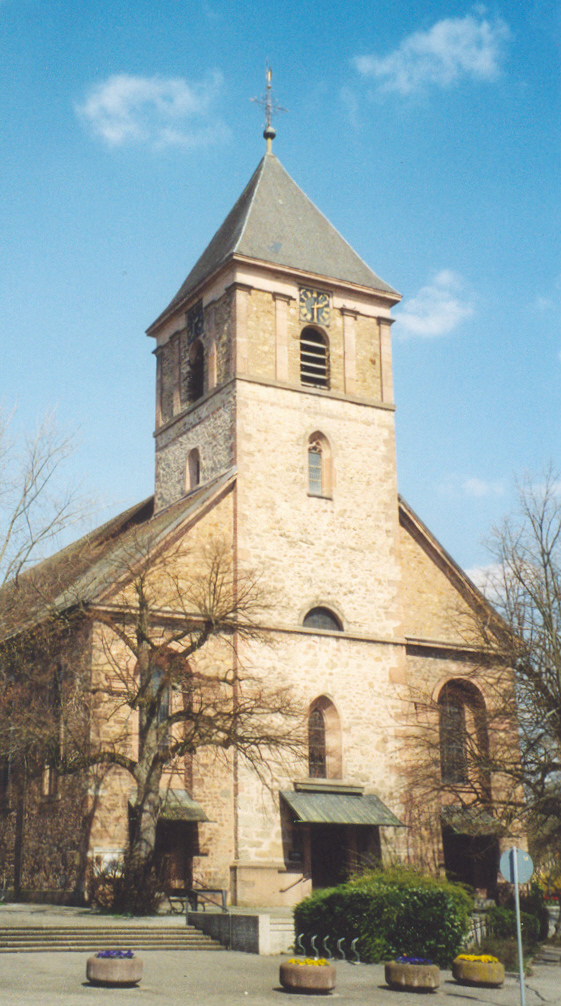
Achern's Church "Unserer lieben Frau" in Weinbrenner-Stil

The former Grand Duchy's hospital is also a sight worth seeing. It was built in 1842 and was also the place where the first Protestant services were held in the city. A dedicated Protestant church was not built until 1909.

In the boroughs one can find the following churches: Catholic Church of Saint Bernard of Baden in Fautenbach (built in 1955 and 1956), Catholic Church of Saint Nicholas in Gamshurst (built in 1927 in neo-baroque style), Catholic Church of Großweier (built from 1901 in neo-Gothic style), Catholic Church of Saint Roman in Mösbach (built in 1862, neo-gothic), Catholic Church of Saint Stefan in Oberachern (built 1903 through 1905 in a mix of neo-classical, late Gothic and baroque styles), Pilgrims Chapel of Saint St. Antonius in Oberachern (built in 1763 and 1764), Catholic Church of Saint Joseph (built in 1808, but Joseph's Chapel existed as early as 1686), Catholic Church of Saint John the Baptist (built in 1899 in neoroman style, but there is evidence that a chapel exited already shortly after the Thirty Years' War).

=== Events ===
- The Stadtfest takes place every other year during the second weekend in July
- The Achern City Soccer Championship is an annual event where the boroughs compete for the title of City Champion.

== Economy and infrastructure ==
As Achern is the center of the otherwise rural region of northern Ortenau District, small merchant enterprises are very important.

=== Infrastructure ===
Achern is located off the Autobahn A 5, Exit Achern (between Karlsruhe and Basel), and is easily accessed by car or truck also via Bundesstraße B 3 that runs through the city.

Achern's railway station is a stop on the Karlsruhe-Basel route, a stop on line S32 and S4 of the Stadtbahn Karlsruhe and used as the starting point of the SWEG line to Ottenhöfen.

Public transport within the city and its immediate surroundings is provided by several bus lines.

=== Media ===
In Achern, the Badischen Neuesten Nachrichten (BNN), a daily newspaper operating out of Karlsruhe, publishes a local edition by the name of Acher und Bühler Bote and the Offenburger Tageblatt publishes its local edition as Acher-Rench-Zeitung.

=== Public service ===
Achern is the seat of a district court, the Finance Ministry maintains an office, and residents can find a notary public. In addition, the Ortenau District Hospital is also located in Achern.

=== Education ===
Achern has a college-track highschool (Gymnasium Achern), a non-college-track highschool (Robert-Schumann-Realschule), a school for the learning disabled (Achertalschule), three grammar and middle schools with a vocational highschool (Antoniusschule Oberachern, Grund- und Hauptschule mit Werkrealschule Achern, Grund- und Hauptschule Önsbach and Vinzenz-Wachter-Schule), as well as five grammar schools, one each in the boroughs of Gamshurst, Grossweier, Mösbach, Sasbachried and Wagshurst.

Ortenau District operates two vocational training schools (Gewerbeschule Achern and Kaufmännische und Hauswirtschaftliche Schule), the Maiwaldschule for the language handicapped, and the nursing school that is attached to the District Hospital in Achern.

Furthermore, Achern is home of the Music and Art School Achern-Oberkirch.

== Notable people ==
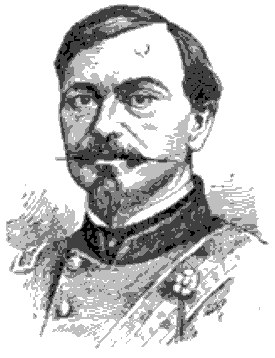
Max Weber, 1904

- Joseph Ignatz Peter (DE Wiki) (1789–1872), politician and revolutionary
- Max Weber (1824–1901), officer of the Army of the Baden Revolution and general of the northern states in the American Civil War.
- Heinrich Hansjakob (1837-1916), Catholic priest, historian, politician and writer, patient at the Illenau hospital
- Alfred Kast (1856–1903), internist, professor at the University of Breslau
- Oscar Burkard (1877–1950), soldier, emigrated to the US in 1895, recipient of the US Medal of Honor
- Julius Hirsch (1892–1945), Olympian soccer player, murdered in Auschwitz; the first Jewish member of the national team, awarded the Iron Cross during WWI
- Bertolt Brecht (1898–1956), influential playwright and poet; as a child, he lived with his grandparents in Achern
- Helmut Merkel (DE Wiki) (born 1949), CEO of the department store chain Karstadt
- Dirk Panter (born 1974), politician
- Florent Muslija (born 1998), footballer who has played over 180 games and 25 for Kosovo

== International relations ==
Since 1987 Achern has partnered with the town of Morez in France.

For the past 18 years, Achern has had an exchange program with Morganton, North Carolina.
