= Acher =

River in Germany

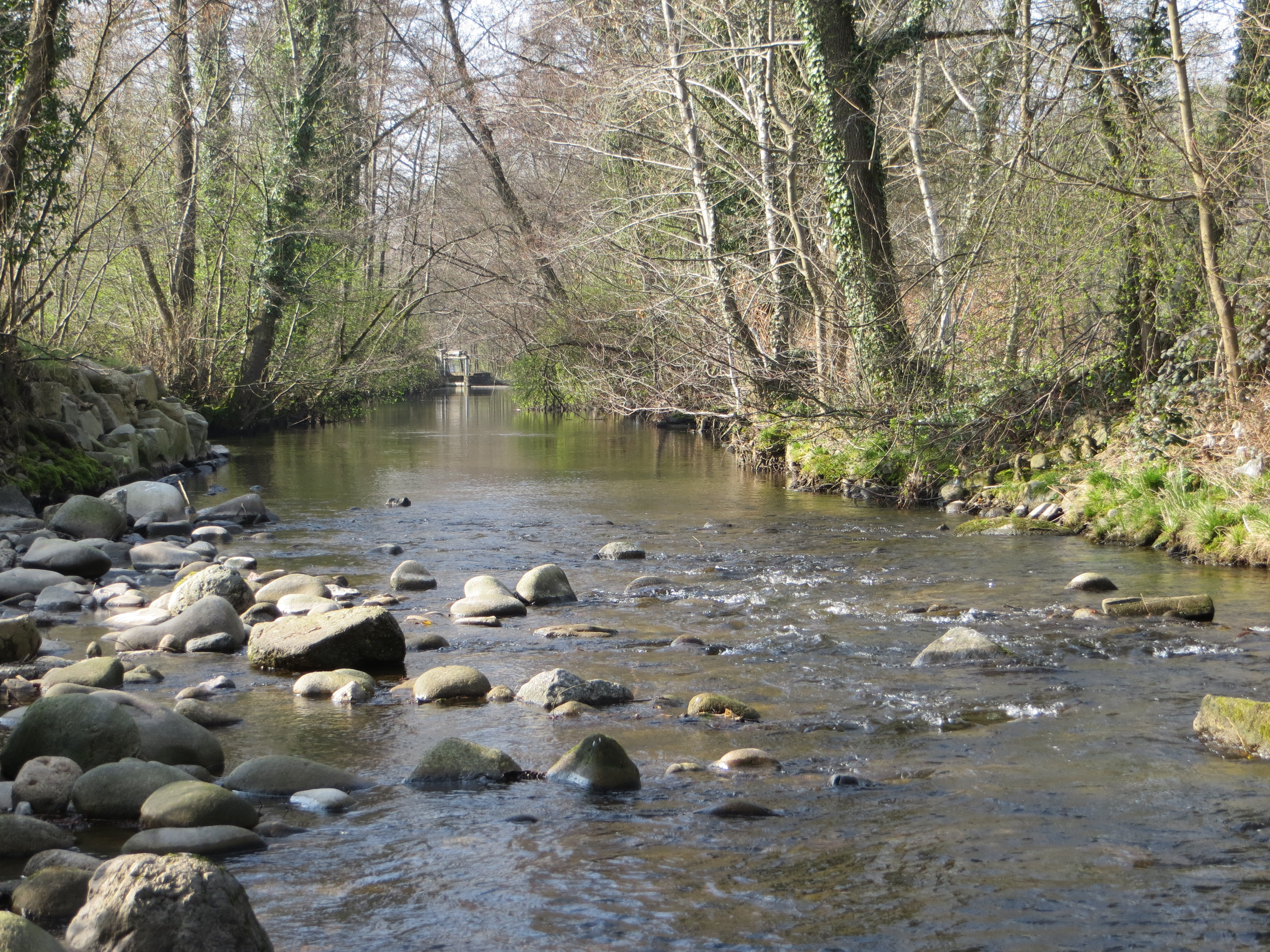
- The Acher near Oberachern

- Mouth of the Acher

Location
- Country: Germany
- State: Baden-Württemberg
- Reference no.: DE: 23572

Physical characteristics
- Source
  - location: On the northeast flank of the Vogelskopf
  - coordinates: 48°33′47″N 8°13′03″E
  - elevation: 848 m above sea level (NN)
- Mouth
  - location: near Iffezheim into the Rhine
  - coordinates: 48°50′39″N 8°07′06″E
  - elevation: 114 m above sea level (NN)
- Length: 53.6 km (33.3 mi)
- Basin size: 448 km^{2}
- Discharge
  - average: 9.13 m^{3}/s 3.39 m^{3}/s (Kappelrodeck, Exit from the Black Forest, 25 % of the catchment)

Basin features
- Progression: Rhine→ North Sea
- Tributaries
  - left: Gottschlägbach, Unterwasserbach, Fautenbach
  - right: Seebach, Grimmerswaldbach, Sulzbach (Laufbach), Sandbach

The Acher (German pronunciation: [ˈaxɐ]) is a river in the districts of Ortenau and Rastatt, Baden-Württemberg, in southern Germany. It is 53.6 km long and flows from the Black Forest to the Rhine in a northwesterly direction, situated between the Rench to the south and the Oos to the north.

== Geography ==
The source area of the Acher lies on the northeastern mountainside of the Vogelskopf (1,055.8 m), an area marked by cirques which formed during the ice age. The spring, called Acherquelle, lies at a height of 848 m in the vicinity of the Ruhesteinloch, named after the Ruhestein Saddle to the east. It is located between the Vogelskopf and Seekopf (1,054.2 m).

The Acher initially flows northwards, descending sharply. It turns westwards at its confluence with the Seebach, which joins from the north from the Mummelsee below the Hornisgrinde. The Acher then flows through the trough-like valley of Seebach, where the valley reaches a depth of about 550 metres between the Hornisgrinde and the Vogelskopf. In this section, the Acher is also called the Seebach, hinting at the fact that this tributary stream from the Mummelsee was originally considered to be the main headstream of the Acher, despite its somewhat lower discharge.

Below Vorderseebach, the Seebach merges with the Grimmerswaldbach coming from the north. The Acher valley then heads south for about a kilometre, roughly up to where the rugged Gottschläg valley joins it above Ottenhöfen. From the point on where the Unterwasser valley joins from the south, the Acher continues in a northwesterly direction, flowing through the municipality of Kappelrodeck toward the Upper Rhine Plain, which it reaches in the town of Achern; the largest town in the northern Ortenaukreis.

In the Rhine Plain, the complexity of the river's course has increased due to numerous hydro-engineering measures, especially the Acher-Rench Connection (Acher-Rench-Korrektion) between 1936 and 1967. Still within the Black Forest foothill zone above Oberachern, the Acherner Mühlbach is severed from the Acher, which here has an average discharge of about 2 m³/s. The Acher itself, also called the Feldbach in Oberachern, then crosses the municipal area of Achern.

Below Achern, the Acher Flood Control Channel (Acher-Flutkanal) splits off from the river, which can channel some discharge toward the Rhine in the case of a flood. Just before the Acher and the flood channel split, the river is joined by the Fautenbach stream.

The river runs northwards as the Acher (Feldbach) towards Greffen, partially canalized, along its original course. Before the construction of the Rhine Side Canal (Rheinseitenkanal) it emptied into the Rhine here. However, the Acher has since been channeled into the Rhine Dyke (Rheindeich). A section of the Rhine Plain Canal used to pass under it coming from the west, being joined by the water-rich Sulzbach, the lower reaches of the Sasbach and Laufbach, as well as the Acherner Mühlbach. The Rhine Plain Canal then used to empty into the Acher itself from the east. Further to the north, the Sandbach finally joins the lower reaches of the Acher known as the Altrheinzug ("Old Course of the Rhine"). It empties below the Iffezheim Lock into the Rhine, around 10 kilometres below its old confluence. From Greffern, the Acher is used as a link for the different areas of the Söllingen/Greffern Polder. In order to protect the Acher even when the polder floods, a pumping station near Greffern was brought into operation in 2005.

== Protected landscape ==
Under the name Oberes Achertal, a protected area was created by the county council of Ortenaukreis around the municipalities of Ottenhöfen im Schwarzwald and Seebach, covering 3,600 hectares. It is protected area no. 3.17.017 and was founded on 6 February 1975.

== See also ==
- List of rivers of Baden-Württemberg

== Bibliography ==
- Britannica Atlas
