= Sandbach (disambiguation) =

Sandbach may refer to:

== Places ==
- Sandbach, a market town in Cheshire, England
  - Sandbach railway station, a railway station serving Sandbach
  - Sandbach services, a motorway service station on the M6
- Sandbach (Acher), a river in Baden-Württemberg, Germany
- Sandbach, Breuberg, a town in Hesse, Germany

== People ==
- Antoinette Sandbach (born 1969), British politician
- Arthur Sandbach (1859–1928), British Army general officer
- Charles Sandbach (1909–1990), British footballer
- Chris Sandbach (born 1985), English cricketer
- Harry Sandbach (1903–1991), British classical scholar
- Margaret Sandbach (1812–1852), British poet and novelist
- Samuel Sandbach (1769–1851), British politician
