= Acher Valley Railway =

Railway line in Germany

Coordinates: 48°34′00″N 8°09′00″E

Achern–Ottenhöfen
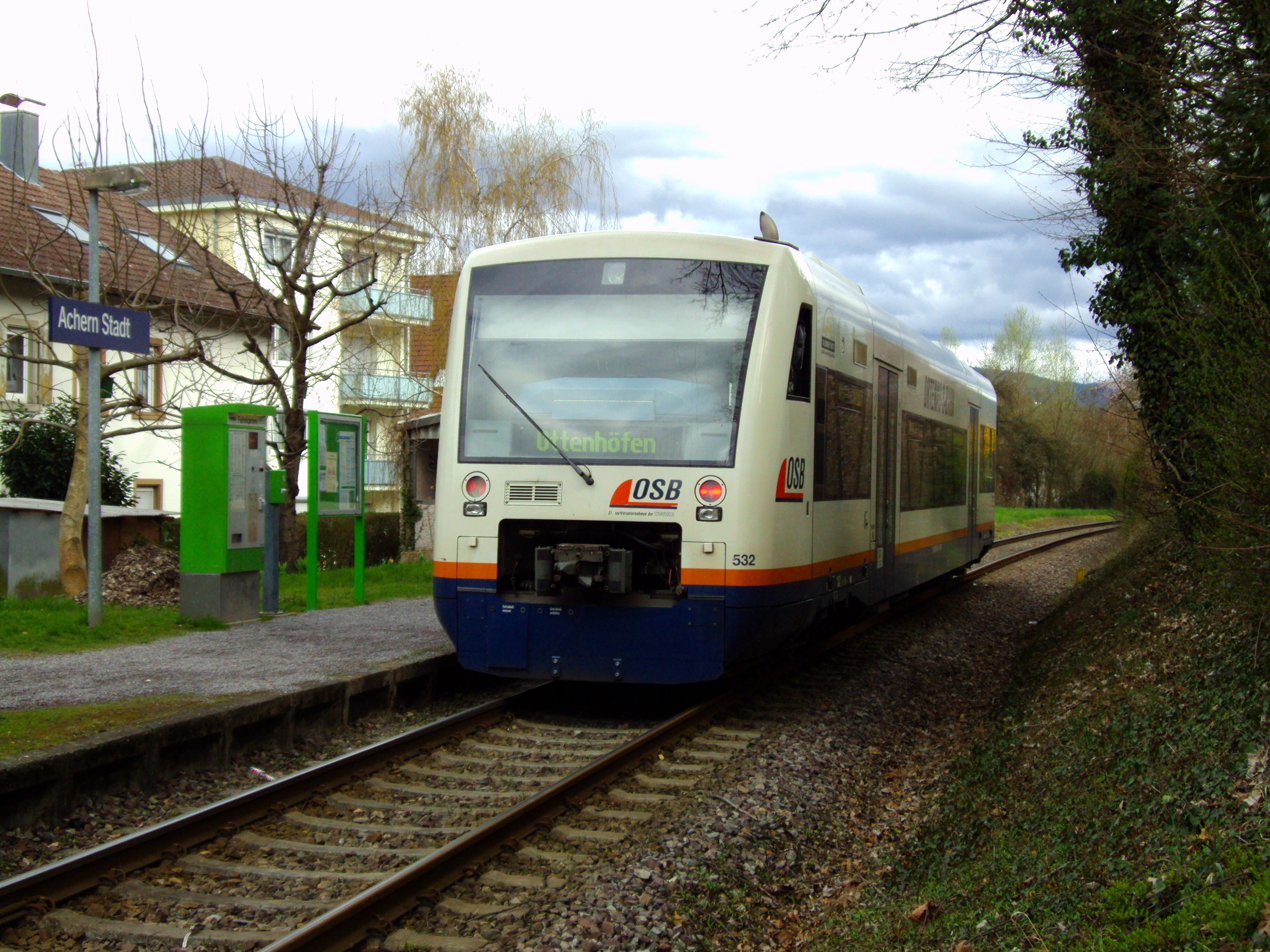

Service
- Route number: 717

Technical
- Line length: 10.4 km
- Track gauge: 1,435 mm

The Acher Valley Railway (German: Achertalbahn) is a 10.4 km long branch line from Achern to Ottenhöfen im Schwarzwald in the Black Forest in Germany that branches off the Rhine Valley Railway.
