= Johann Hofer =

German lawyer (1810–1880)

Johann Hofer (18 August 1810 in Önsbach, Baden – 4 August 1880 in Offenburg) was a German lawyer.

He and his wife Amalie Hofer, née Weissenrieder (12 September 1820 in Gengenbach, 18 February 1872) were agitators and revolutionaries in the 1848 Revolution. Afterwards, he and his wife sought refuge first in Switzerland, and then from July 1851 in Hoboken, New Jersey. They were able to return home to Germany in the 1860s, and did so.

Johann and Amalie were the parents of at least three children: Ernest Hofer, born in 1843, Otto Hofer, born in 1845, and Berta Amalia Mathilde Hofer, born in 1846.

== Literature ==
- JANSEN-DEGOTT, Ruth: "Amalie Hofer, geb. Weissenrieder – Auf den Spuren einer politisch engagierten Frau." In: Die Ortenau. Veröffentlichungen des historischen Vereins für Mittelbaden, Bd. 78 [1998], S. 592–606.
- VOLLMER, Franz X.: Offenburg 1848/49. Ereignisse und Lebensbilder aus einem Zentrum der badischen Revolution, Karlsruhe, 1997.
- ASCHE, Susanne: „Freigesinnte Schöne“ – Die Rolle der Frauen in der badischen Revolution 1848/49. In: Die Ortenau. Veröffentlichungen des historischen Vereins für Mittelbaden, Bd. 78 [1998], S. 579–606.
- SCHELLINGER, Uwe: „... und besonders verdient die Frauenwelt das Lob, zum Besseren mitgewirkt zu haben“. Die Rolle der Frauen während der Revolutionsereignisse 1848/1849 am Beispiel der Aktivitäten in der Ortenau, In: Die Ortenau. Veröffentlichungen des Historischen Vereins für Mittelbaden, Bd. 76 [1996], S. 321–356.
