= Sasbachwalden =

- Municipality
- Coat of arms

- Location of Sasbachwalden within Ortenaukreis district
- Interactive map of Sasbachwalden
- Location within Germany Location within Baden-Württemberg
- Coordinates: 48°37′06″N 08°07′38″E
- Country: Germany
- State: Baden-Württemberg
- Admin. region: Freiburg
- District: Ortenaukreis

Government
  - Mayor (2024–32): Sonja Schuchter (CDU)

Area
  - Total: 18.13 km^{2} (7.00 sq mi)
- Elevation: 257 m (843 ft)

Population (2025-12-31)
  - Total: 2,601
  - Density: 143.5/km^{2} (371.6/sq mi)
- Time zone: UTC+01:00 (CET)
  - Summer (DST): UTC+02:00 (CEST)
- Postal codes: 77887
- Dialling codes: 07841
- Vehicle registration: OG, BH, KEL, LR, WOL
- Website: www.sasbachwalden.de

Sasbachwalden is a Black Forest municipality in Western Baden-Württemberg, Germany, popular with tourists. It is located on the western slopes of mountain Hornisgrinde in the Northern Black Forest and belongs to the district of Ortenau. More than 70% of the town area are forest.

== History ==
Sasbachwalden was first mentioned in 1347 as a group of individual farms and houses. Only in 1817 Sasbachwalden became an independent community. Since 1973 the town belongs to district of Ortenau.

== Education ==
The town has a centrally located kindergarten and elementary school. Institutions for higher education are in the nearby towns Achern and Sasbach.

== Economy ==
Main sources of income are tourism, winegrowing, the production of Black Forest kirsch and most importantly wood processing.

== See also ==
- Alde Gott
