= Amalie Hofer =

Amalie Hofer, née Weissenrieder (12 September 1820, in Gengenbach, Baden – 18 February 1872) was the German wife of Johann Hofer (18 August 1810, in Önsbach – 4 August 1880, in Offenburg)

Both were agitators and revolutionaries in the 1848 Revolution. Afterward, they sought refuge first in Switzerland, and then from July 1851 in Hoboken, New Jersey. They were finally able to return to Germany in the 1860s.

Johann and Amalie were the parents of at least three children, Ernest Hofer, born in 1843, Otto, born in 1845, and Berta Amalia Mathilde Hofer, born in 1846.

== Literature ==
- JANSEN-DEGOTT, Ruth: "Amalie Hofer, geb. Weissenrieder – Auf den Spuren einer politisch engagierten Frau". In: Die Ortenau. Veröffentlichungen des historischen Vereins für Mittelbaden, Bd. 78 [1998], S. 592–606.
- VOLLMER, Franz X.: Offenburg 1848/49. Ereignisse und Lebensbilder aus einem Zentrum der badischen Revolution, Karlsruhe, 1997.
- ASCHE, Susanne: „Freigesinnte Schöne“ – Die Rolle der Frauen in der badischen Revolution 1848/49, In: Die Ortenau. Veröffentlichungen des historischen Vereins für Mittelbaden, Bd. 78 [1998], S. 579–606.
- SCHELLINGER, Uwe: „... und besonders verdient die Frauenwelt das Lob, zum Besseren mitgewirkt zu haben“. Die Rolle der Frauen während der Revolutionsereignisse 1848/1849 am Beispiel der Aktivitäten in der Ortenau, In: Die Ortenau. Veröffentlichungen des Historischen Vereins für Mittelbaden, Bd. 76 [1996], S. 321–356.
