= Gymnasium Achern =

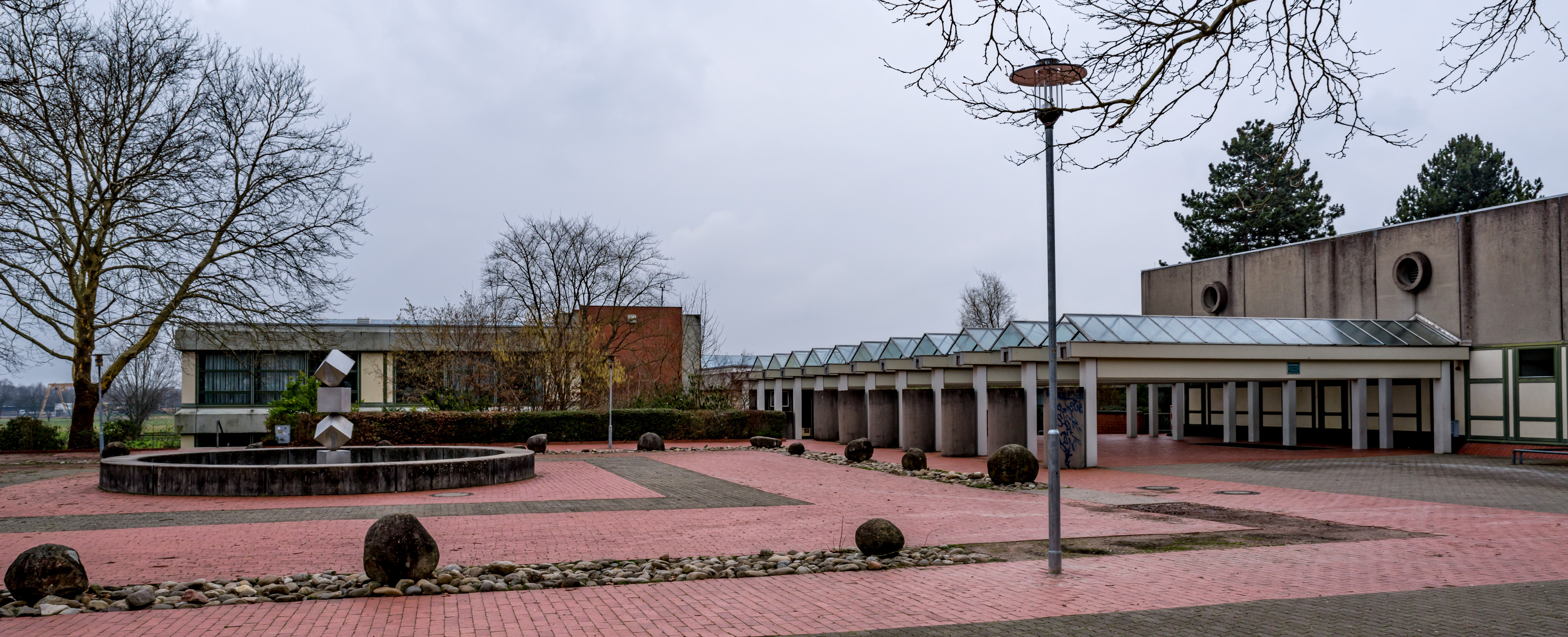
- Gymnasium Achern

Location
- Berliner Str. 30; Achern; Deutschland, Baden-Württemberg, 77855
- Coordinates: 48°38′11.33″N 8°4′51.85″E

Information
- Type: Gymnasium
- Founded: 1877
- Principal: Fabian Sauter Servaes
- Teaching staff: approx. 100
- Enrollment: approx. 1000
- Website: www.gymnasium-achern.de

Gymnasium Achern is a Gymnasium (grammar school) in Achern, Baden-Württemberg, Germany, founded in 1877. Its address is Berlinerstraße 30. It has about 1000 students and 95 teachers. The current principal is Fabian Sauter Servaes. It emphasizes science, foreign languages, and art. It was one of the first gymnasiums in Baden-Württemberg to graduate its students after eight years instead of the usual nine years, before this was made compulsory for all gymnasiums in the state.

== History ==
The Gymnasium Achern was founded in 1877 as Höhere Bürgerschule. In 1905 it was extended to a Realschule and moved to a new building and in 1921 it was raised to a Realgymnasium. In 1976 the school moved to the present building; the previous building, built in 1905, houses the Robert-Schuman-Realschule. The older part of the building serves as a residential building. Two extensions to the current building followed in 1997 and 2002. A new building was completed in 2010, which also houses a canteen and creative rooms.

== Name ==
Though many names have been proposed, Gymnasium Achern was never named after a person. Proposed names included the poet Bertolt Brecht, who often spent his holidays with his grandparents who lived in Achern, and Franz Josef Ritter von Buß, a Catholic politician of the 19th century.

== Equipment ==
Due to the emphasis on art education, the Gymnasium Achern has special rooms for this subject area, for example for stone working. It also has extended sports facilities, including two beach volleyball fields and one beach soccer field. Each classroom is equipped with a personal computer, projector and an overhead projector. On the school grounds there is also a station for the breeding of storks.

== School partnerships ==
Every fall, Gymnasium Achern sends a group of students to Freedom High School in Morganton, North Carolina, United States to stay with student's families for two weeks as a part of the German American Partnership Program (GAPP). Then, the next summer, Freedom sends a group of students to stay with the Gymnasium's student's families. 2007 was the 19th year of the program. Other exchange programmes as with the Regina Mundi College Cork in Ireland, Groupe scolaire Saint-Ouen, Pont-Audemer in Normandy, France, Colegio Ágora de Madrid in Spain and the Hangzhou Highschool No. 2 in Hangzhou, China are there at the Gymnasium Achern too.

== Principals ==
- until 1986: Egon Stiegeler
- 1986–2012: Paul Droll
- 2012-2021: Stefan Weih
- 2021: Bernhard Seiler-Dollhofer (acting)

== Awards ==
In 2005, the Gymnasium Achern was declared the best school of Germany by the journal Capital.

For its extraordinary commitment to Germany's youth competition Jugend forscht, Gymnasium Achern was awarded the Jugend forscht Schulpreis 2011. The high school demonstrated many years of outstanding performance in Jugend forscht based on the number and quality of the submitted research projects.
