= Gertelbach Falls =

Coordinates: 48.66245°N 8.21474°E

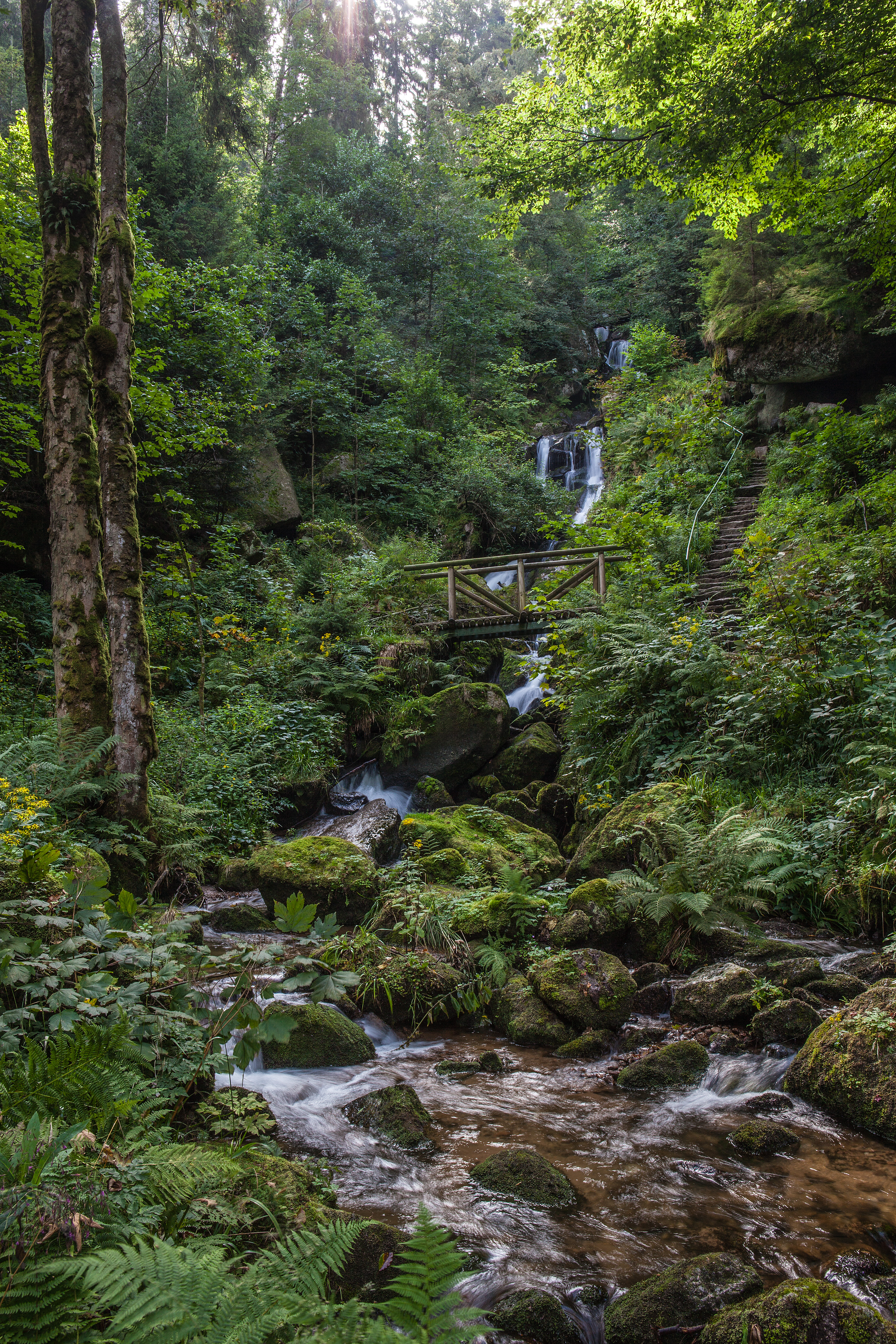
The Gertelbach Falls: the lower 40 metres of the main falls area

The Gertelbach Falls (German: Gertelbachfälle) or Gertelbach Waterfalls (Gertelbach-Wasserfälle), formerly also the Gertelbach Gorge (Gertelbachschlucht), are on the Gertelbach stream in the Bühlertal valley in the Northern Black Forest in Germany.

The Gertelbach begins in a spring horizon between the Lower Bunter Sandstone and the Bühlertal Granite, west of the Black Forest High Road, and empties after just 2.5 kilometres into the (smaller) Wiedenbach. The stream thus drops through about 330 metres of height. In the steepest section, about 800 metres before its confluence, the stream drops in cascades for 220 metres over about 15 steps, each of 2 to 6 metres high. The main area of falls in the upper third of the valley step measures 70 metres and ends at a height of over 600 m above NHN.
