= Johann Nikolaus Weislinger =

German Roman Catholic theologian

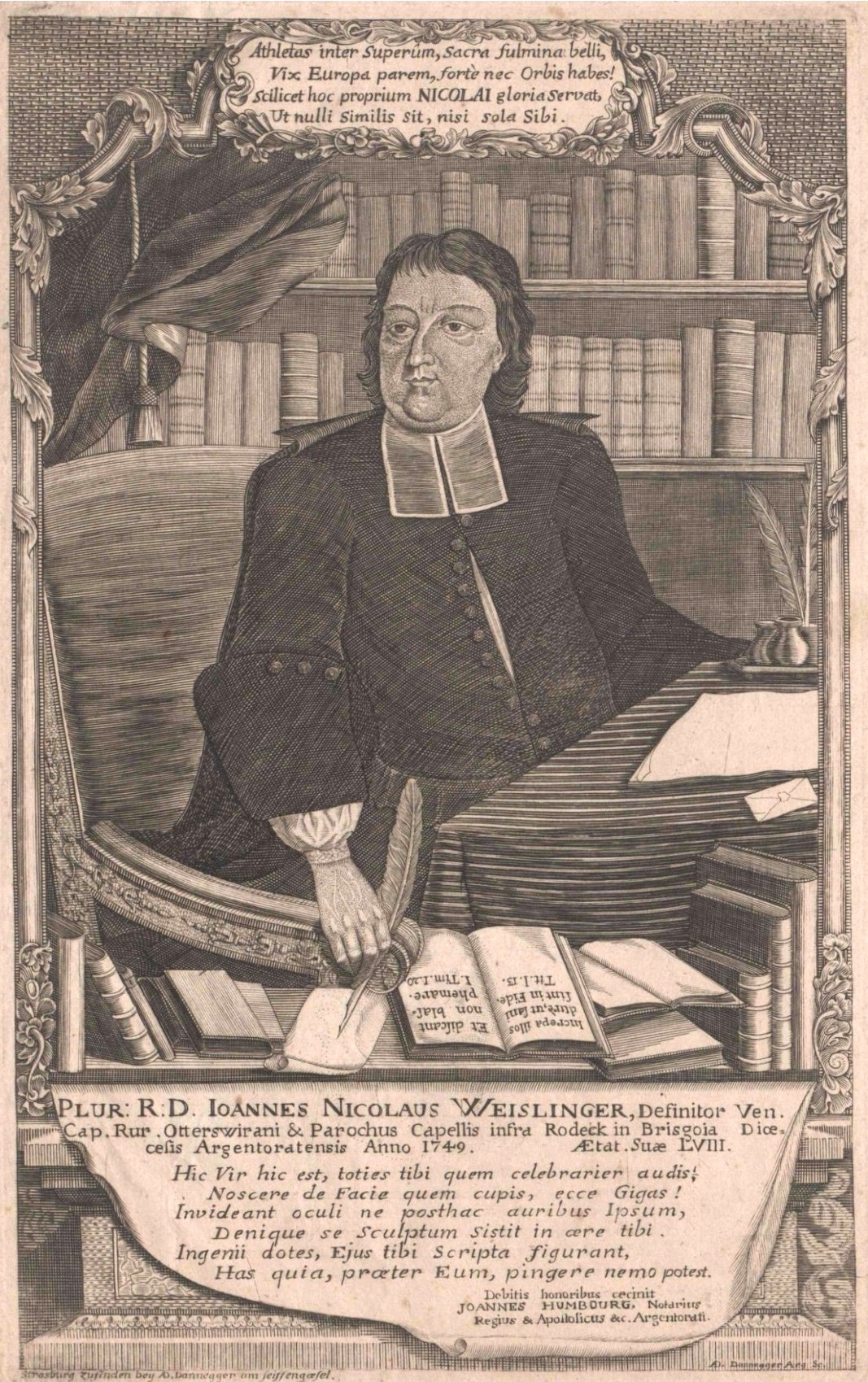
Johann Nikolaus Weislinger

Johann Nikolaus Weislinger (1691 – 29 August 1755) was a Catholic polemical writer.

== Life ==
Weislinger was born at Püttlingen in German Lorraine. After attending the Jesuit high-school at Strasbourg, he became a private tutor in 1711. From 1713 he studied philosophy at the University of Heidelberg, then took up theology and prepared for ordination as priest under the direction of the Jesuits at Strasburg.

Soon after ordination he was appointed parish priest at Waldulm (1726), and in 1730 at Kappelrodeck, but in 1750, on account of severe illness, he was obliged to resign his position. He died at Kappelrodeck in Baden.

== Works ==
Weislinger was a prolific controversialist, widely read in the writings of his opponents. The Catholic Encyclopedia describes him as having a "keen mind" and being "quick at repartee", but as using "coarse and rough" language. Historian Ulrich L. Lehner characterizes his style as "offensive" and "ferocious", damaging the Protestant-Catholic relations of his day.

The most famous of Weislinger's writings is Friss Vogel oder stirb!, which he composed when a student of theology; it appeared at Strasburg, 1723, and was often reprinted. Among his other polemical writings are:

- Huttenus delarvatus (Constance and Augsburg, 1730)
- Hochst billig und grundliche Antwort auf die unbillig und grundlose Klagen (Augsburg, 1733)
- Auserlesene Merkwurdigkeiten von alten und neuen theologischen Marktschreiern (Strasburg, 1738)
- Schutz-Schrift des scharf angeklagten, doch aber ganz unschuldig befundenen Luthertums (Strasburg, 1840-).
- He issued a new edition of Kaufmann's Katholisch ist gut sterben (Strasburg, 1744).
