= Altschweier =

Coordinates: 48°42′N 8°10′E

Altschweier is a village to the east of the town of Bühl (Baden) in Southwest Germany. It is located in the Bühlot valley on both sides of the Bühlot stream extending into the foothills of the Black Forest mountain range. In 2004, the population of Altschweier was about 2100.

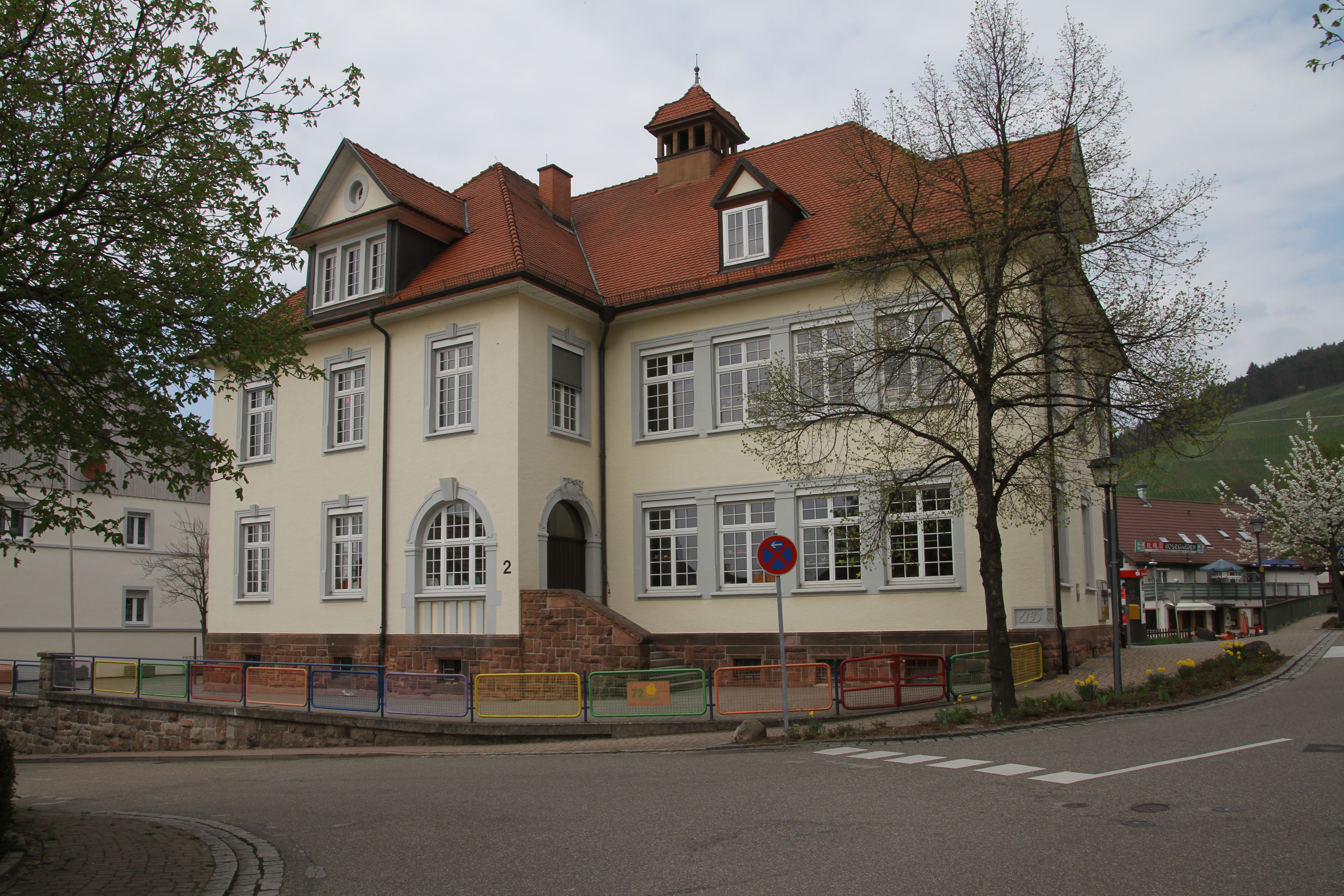

== Geography ==
The Bühlot valley is carved deep into the foothills and mountains of the Black Forest. Most of Bühl is located in the flat area of the Rhine Valley at an elevation of 300–400 feet above sea level bordering the foothill region to the east. Altschweier is surrounded by Eisental to the North, Kappelwindeck to the South and Bühlertal to the East. Bühlertal is a town alongside the Bühlot stream further extending into the Northern Black Forest than Altschweier.

== Infrastructure ==
Altschweier is about 2–3 miles away from to the center of Bühl (Baden). It can be reached locally from downtown Bühl via two ancient roads: Bühlertalstrasse, which extends from Main Street (Haupstraße) in Southern Bühl alongside the Bühlot, and the Bühler Seite, which extends from Main Street in Bühl alongside the Northern opposite bank of the Bühlot, closely following the river bed. Most of the houses of Altschweier are located on one, sometimes on both sides of those two roads, the main arteries of the village. An additional 20th century county road connects Bühl with Altschweier extending even further into the Bühler Valley and the Black Forest. It is the fastest way to reach Altschweier coming from the Autobahn A5 without having to drive through Bühl. The L83 is crossing the B3 just north of Bühl, it then cuts through hills over a deep valley, eventually reaching the lower Altschweier valley. It is then heading further East, changing from a flat road to a steeply-inclined mountain road, eventually reaching the peaks of the Black Forest, the latter a major touristic region.

== Economy ==
Due to its location, Altschweier has the benefits of being at almost the same altitude as Bühl with similar temperatures year around, but protected from cold winds by the mountains from the North and East surrounding the village like a horseshoe, reaching altitudes of up to 3,000 feet (910 m). The hills and their high quality soil offer perfect conditions for growing a variety of fruits. Wine is grown in the steep hills facing South; the sun can penetrate the dense leaves much better, which results in improved levels of sugar and alcohol, respectively, critical for a good wine. This has elevated the region to one of the top wine growing regions in Germany, with Pinot noir (Spätburgunder) and Riesling the predominant grape varieties grown. Several other fruits were and are still grown in Altschweier, plums among the most successful commercial fruits, the so-called Bühler Früh-Zwetschge. Wine and plums are only able to support a much reduced number of full-time farmers today compared with previous centuries. Some run their farms or what's left over half-time or as a hobby. Altschweier always was and still is a rural village. In the past the majority of the inhabitants were involved in farming. Grapes were grown since medieval times. The population of Altschweier was much smaller then, possibly only one or two hundred people, originally farmers skilled in wine making and other related crafts. The making and selling of wine still is a major source of income for the inhabitants of Altschweier. In the region, wine making wasn't limited to Altschweier though, but also to other towns and villages alongside the foothills or the Western flank of the Black Forest mountains, a wine region called the Ortenau. The name Ortenau for the wine region should not be confused with the Ortenau County, even though there's some substantial overlap between the wine region Ortenau and the political region of the Ortenaukreis and the historic region Ortenau. The larger historic region of Ortenau, formerly Mortenau during the early days of the Holy Roman Empire, was a region settled by Alemans, reaching from the rivers of Bleich in the south to the Murg in the north, the Black Forest forming a natural border to the east, the Rhine river a natural border to the west. The Ortenau/Mortenau was settled by a tribe of Germanic origin around 600 A.D. The language spoken in Altschweier is German, the dialect is Alemannic German or Alemannisch, a Germanic language which is shared with the Alsace in France and Switzerland. Since these countries share the same German dialect, an independent Wiki page exists featuring this dialect as a separate 'language' besides German.

The water power of the Bühlot was used in the past to drive the turbines of several mills, cereal mills, oil mills, and saw mills, for the manufacturing of flour and oil needed for food and wood required by carpenters, respectively. The water was also used to keep the furnaces heated to convert iron ore to iron. The mills and iron plant are long gone. Hydro-power is only rarely used for commercial milling nowadays and not enough to generate hydroelectric power. Remains of a few of the mills and artificial canals are still visible, one of them actually used as a museum to display the art of milling, the so-called Rohrhirsch-Mühle, named after its last owner. The water of the Büllot was also used in the past to ferment the hemp plant and to run mills to produce finished hemp, ready to be woven into fabrics made from hemp fibers. Besides wine, hemp was another major source of income from agriculture for the region in the past. It has completely lost its significance with the rise of cotton imported from other countries in the early 19th century. All these small-scale industrial activities have ceased to exist; there is no industry left over in Altschweier. A substantial fraction of the population of Altschweier is employed in the nearby town of Bühl, working for the local industry as blue-collar workers, and elsewhere, in local administrations, schools, shops, as teachers, engineers, architects, bankers, etc. Altschweier has become a residential area with apartment houses interlaced with old farm houses, some of them 300 years and older, still inhabited and used. The sound of tractors can be heard once in a while; the noises and smell of cows, pigs, horses or chicken however have stopped. Meat and milk are purchased at local shops and supermarkets in the area.

The incline and decline of the local industry, bad or good years for farmers due to reoccurring changes in climate and times of war and peace have had their impact on the population, with waves of immigrants populating the region or emigrants leaving the region for better opportunities.

== History ==
As the name Weier implies the origin of the village (= villa = weier) was an agglomerate of a few individual estates/villas or farms, loosely connected. Over time these farms grew together, eventually named after the largest estate, which was presumably owned by a person named Alger or Adalger. The name of the town appeared as Algeswilre in 1265 A.D. for the first time in records. It can be assumed that the village is much older. The history of the village of Altschweier is well documented in two books. Both authors tried not only to cover the history in general, but moreover with the history of the village and nearby town of Bühl an integral part, somehow interweaved into the political history of the region and country, but also with the local history, which has had its impact on the village itself and its inhabitants/citizens. The information was extracted from old documents, church registers, maps, etc. The authors have included family names of villagers, drawings, photos, lists of the majors, families, occupations, emigrants, etc., which makes the books a valuable source for local people with an interest in history, but also for people from abroad, searching for their family roots.

The religion of the area and the ecclesiastical history is also covered in the books mentioned above. Due to the history of the area, Altschweier was split in two parts for many centuries, the Northern part belonging to the parish of St. Peter and Paul in Bühl, the so-called "Bühler Seite", the Southern part belonging to the parish of St. Maria in Kappelwindeck, the so-called "Kappler Seite". The division of the village has its roots in the political history of the area, ownership by different local and regional aristocrat families and rulers, the margraves of Baden and the knights of Windeck Castle as the most important rulers, respectively, the Bühlot river serving as a border to mark the territories, which also had its impact on its ecclesiastical status. The majority of the population of Altschweier is Roman Catholic. Altschweier has become an independent parish in 1869 after finishing the construction of the church, the latter consecrated St. Gallus. Due to people moving to Altschweier, the village has a small, but sizable population of beliefs other than Catholics and Lutherans/Protestants.
