= Püttlingen =

- Town
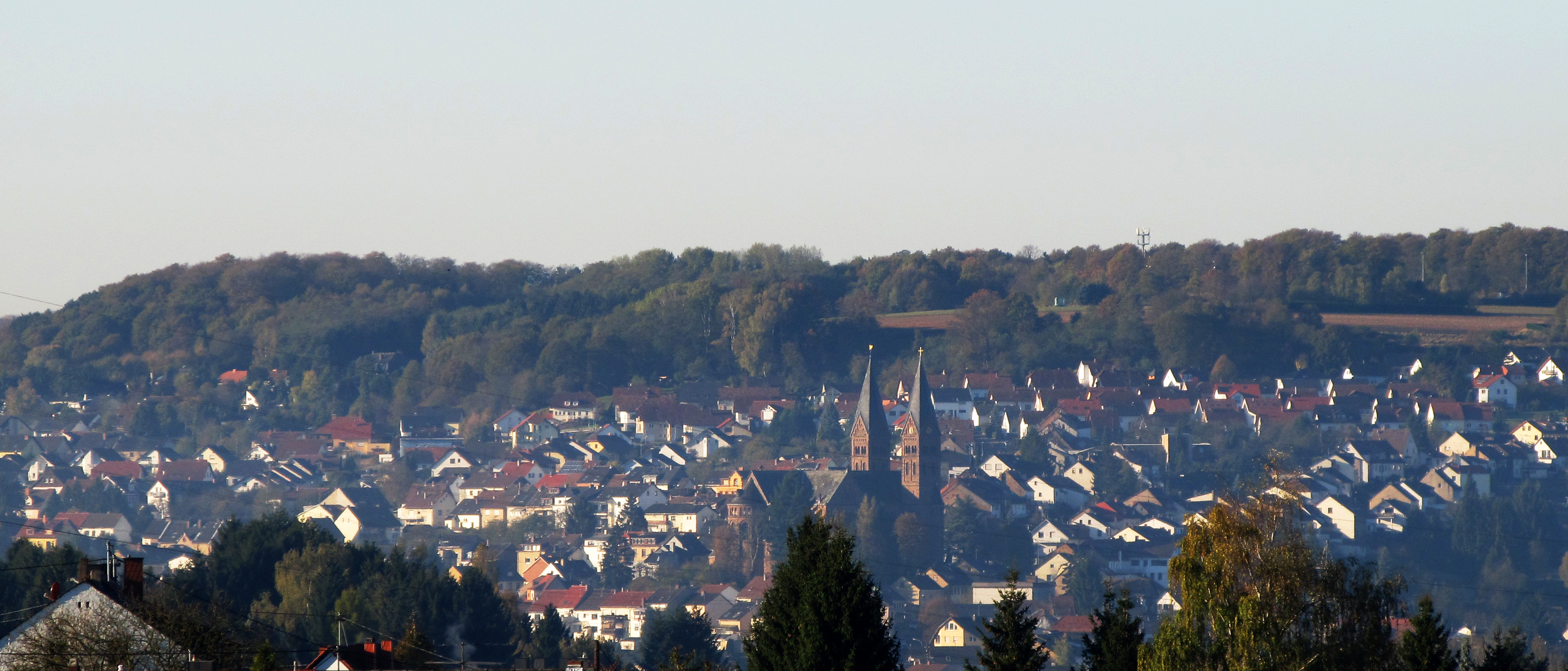
- Püttlingen

- Flag Coat of arms

- Location of Püttlingen within Saarbrücken district
- Interactive map of Püttlingen
- Location within Germany Location within Saarland
- Coordinates: 49°17′N 6°53′E
- Country: Germany
- State: Saarland
- District: Saarbrücken
- Subdivisions: 2

Government
  - Mayor (2019–29): Denise Klein (SPD)

Area
  - Total: 23.95 km^{2} (9.25 sq mi)
- Elevation: 273 m (896 ft)

Population (2025-12-31)
  - Total: 18,314
  - Density: 764.7/km^{2} (1,981/sq mi)
- Time zone: UTC+01:00 (CET)
  - Summer (DST): UTC+02:00 (CEST)
- Postal codes: 66337–66346
- Dialling codes: 06806, 06898
- Vehicle registration: SB
- Website: www.puettlingen.de

Püttlingen (pronounced [ˈpʏtlɪŋən]) is a town in Saarland, Germany, 10 km northwest of Saarbrücken.

== Geography ==
The town lies in the Köller Valley, approximately 20 km to the northwest of Saarbrücken and 5 km north of Völklingen. Going in a clockwise direction from the north, the neighbouring communities are Heusweiler, Riegelsberg, Saarbrücken and Völklingen in the Regionalverband Saarbrücken and the communities of Bous and Schwalbach in the Landkreis Saarlouis.

=== Climate ===
The annual precipitation amounts to 834 mm which places it in the top third of German locales according to the German Weather Service. The driest month is April, while November, the wettest month, sees 1.4 times as much rain.

=== Subdivision ===
The town is composed of the subdivisions of Püttlingen (made up of the Berg, Bengesen and Ritterstraße areas) and Köllerbach (made up of the Engelfangen, Etzenhofen, Herchenbach, Kölln, Rittenhofen, and Sellerbach areas).

== Mayors ==
- 1946–1949: Peter Zimmer
- 1949–1956: Peter Müller
- 1956–1966: Nikolaus Boßmann, CDU
- 1966–1974: Hans Koch, independent
- 1974–2001: Rudolf Müller, CDU
- 2002–2019: Martin Speicher, CDU
- 2019–incumbent : Denise Klein, SPD

== Twin towns – sister cities ==
Püttlingen is twinned with:

- Ber, Mali
- Créhange, France
- Fresagrandinaria, Italy
- Nowa Sól, Poland
- Saint-Michel-sur-Orge, France
- Senftenberg, Germany
- Veszprém, Hungary
- Žamberk, Czech Republic

== Notable people ==
- Annegret Kramp-Karrenbauer (born 1962), politician (CDU)
- Patrik Kühnen (born 1966), tennis player and Davis Cup team captain
- Johann Nikolaus Weislinger (1691–1755), Jesuit polemicist
- Hendrick Zuck (born 1990), footballer
