= Alde Gott =

Wine retailer

The Alde Gott Winzer eG (eG stands for registered cooperative society) was founded in Sasbachwalden (Germany) in 1948 and is part of the wine-growing region Baden. Today, there are 380 producers who cultivate 263 hectare of vines. Günter Lehmann runs the Alde Gott Winery eG as the general manager while cellarer Michael Huber is responsible for the winemaking.

== Wines ==
With around 62% the grape variety Blue Pinot Noir is cultivated on the majority of the vine area. Next comes the Riesling with 14%, the Müller-Thurgau with 12% and the Pinot gris with 8% of the grape variety proportion. Moreover, the Gewürztraminer, Pinot blanc, Chardonnay, Sauvignon blanc, Cabernet Dorsa and Cabernet Sauvignon are cultivated as well. The total annual production amounts, with 75 litres of wine per acre, to around 1.8 million litres of wine. All of the wine grapes are cultivated on the Alde Gott wine cultivation area (“Alde Gott Großlage”). The soil consists of weathered granitic and sand rocks.

== History ==
"The old God is still alive!" This redemptive cry of a man when he saw another survivor at the end of the Thirty Years' War gave this wine region its name. Today a stony wayside shrine, entwined with vine branches, between Sasbachwalden and the neighbouring town Obersasbach remembers this event. However, in this area viniculture was already practised in the past. Documentary evidence marks the year 1601 as the date of granting the right to grow wine in this area.

== Awards ==
- The magazine "Der Feinschmecker" (lit. the gourmet) repeatedly chose the "Alde Gott Winery eG" into the circle of Germany's best vineyards.
- The "Gault Millau Wine Guide 2011" selected the "Alde Gott Winery eG" as one of the recommended firms in the cultivation area Baden.
- The Baden Association of Viniculture honored three wines with a gold medal in the category "spring and summer wines".
- The "Riesling late vintage dry" of 2009 was awarded second place by the State Ministry of Baden-Wuerttemberg at the "Artvinum"-Wineawards.
- Three wines were honored with gold and six with silver at the AWC Vienna 2010 (Austrian Wine Challenge).
- The German Agricultural Society wine guide 2011 chose the "Alde Gott Winery eG" again into the Top 100 of viniculture enterprises in Germany.
