= Foothill zone (Upper Rhine Graben) =

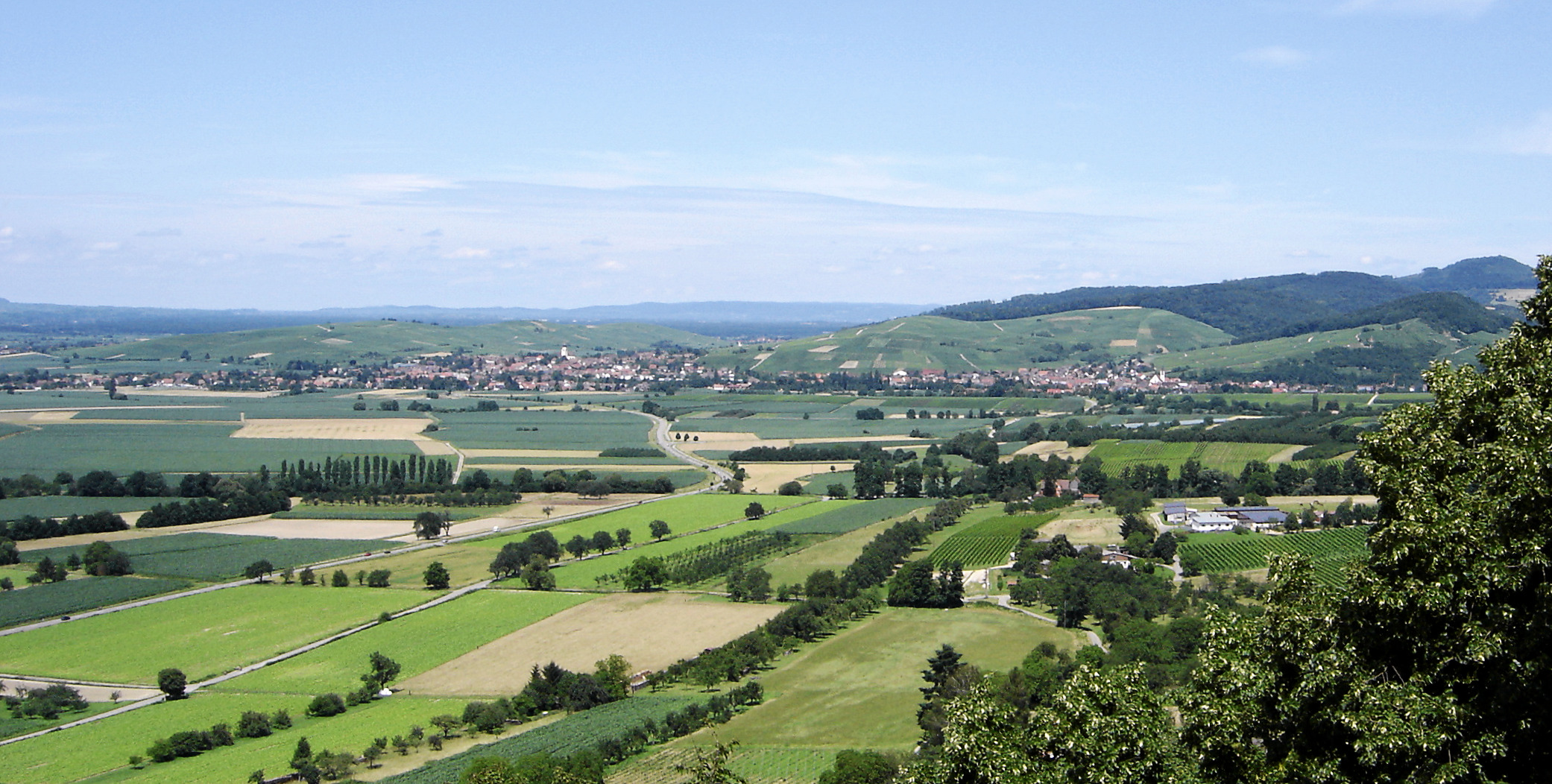
The Upper Rhine Plain and foothill zone of the southern Black Forest. View from Staufen Castle towards Schönberg (rear right)

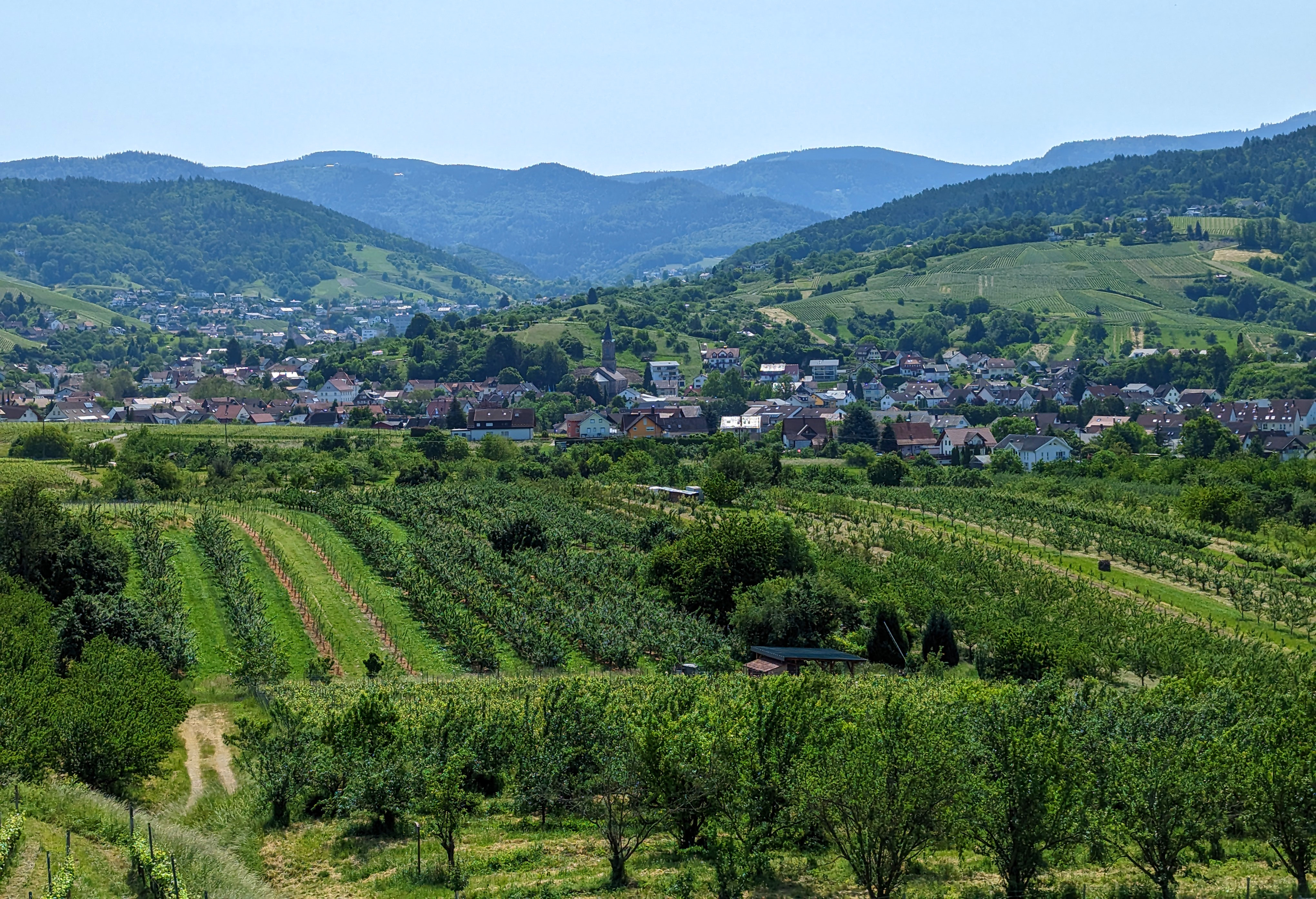
Foothill zone of the northern Black Forest near Bühl (Baden)

The foothill zone of the Upper Rhine Plain (German: Vorbergzone des Oberrheingraben) is the hill country in front of the mountains either side of the Upper Rhine Plain, especially those in front of the Black Forest, Vosges and Palatinate Forest. When the rift valley sank the foothills on the flanks of the mountain ranges were left hanging as fault blocks. The strata of the platform have been preserved in this zone, whereas they have been eroded from the neighbouring higher blocks. They are usually covered by a layer of loess and offer good conditions for agricultural use. For example, in Baden, the Alsace and the Palatinate intensive orchard and vineyard cultivation is practised in the foothill zone.
