= Önsbach =

- Borough of Achern
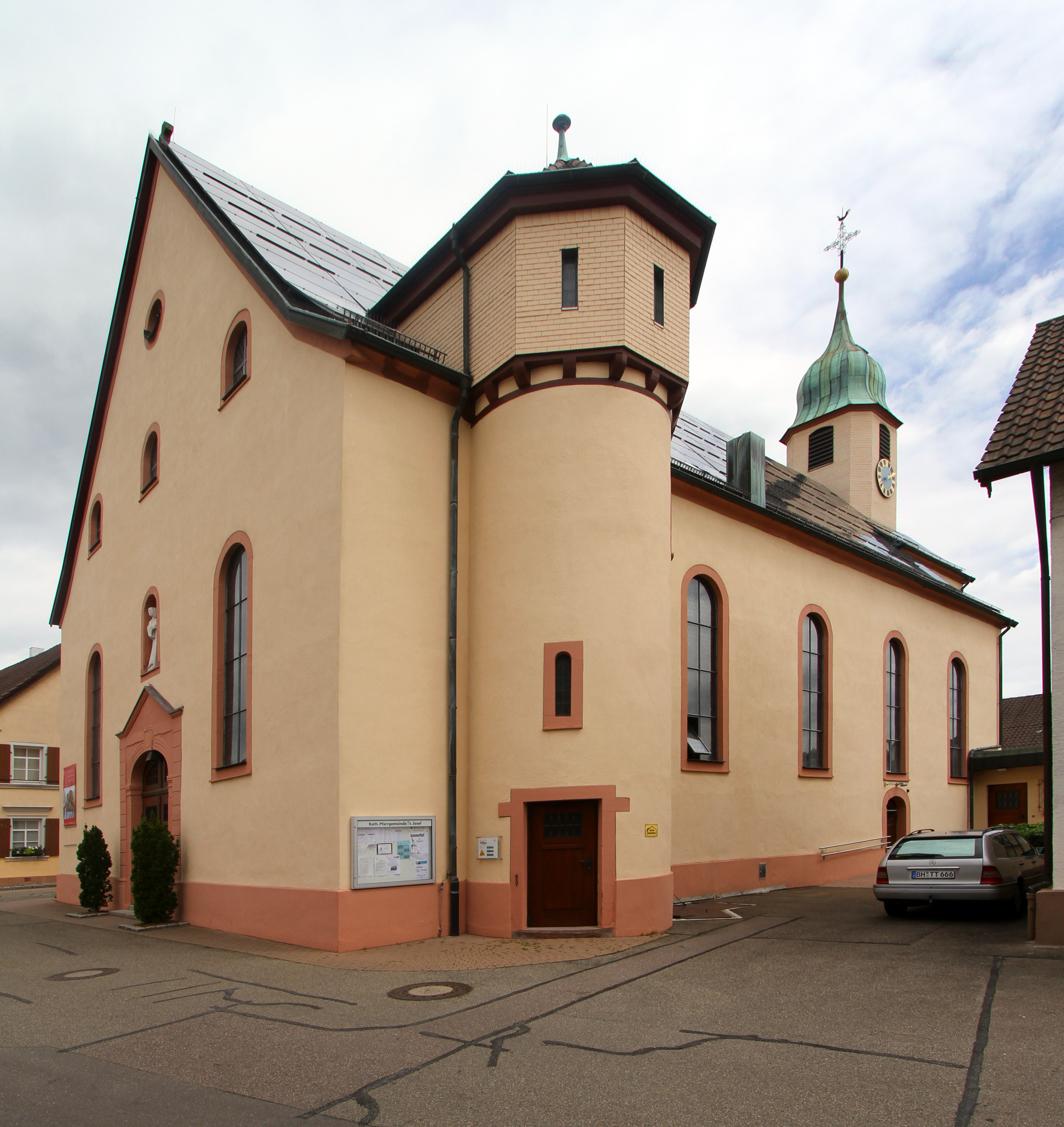
- St. Josef

- Coat of arms
- Interactive map of Önsbach
- Location within Germany Location within Baden-Württemberg
- Coordinates: 48°36′19″N 8°02′10″E
- Country: Germany
- State: Baden-Württemberg
- Admin. region: Freiburg
- District: Ortenaukreis
- Town: Achern

Population (2013-12-31)
  - Total: 2,232
- Time zone: UTC+01:00 (CET)
  - Summer (DST): UTC+02:00 (CEST)

Önsbach is the second-largest district ("Stadtteil") of the major district town ("Kreisstadt") of Achern in the north of Ortenaukreis, located in the Black Forest.

Önsbach is located in northern Ortenau, south of the town of Achern. A third of the village lies in the Rhine valley and two thirds, in the western foothills of the Black Forest. Önsbach is located along Bundesstraße 3 (B 3).

== History ==
The earliest documentary evidence of Önsbach appears in a 1225 Papal bull of Honorius III in which the town is called Ongersbac where the cloister of Ettenheim held property.

In 1230 there was mention of a "Hof" (courtyard or farmyard) in Ongisbach. Ortenau, in which Önsbach is located, became part of the Grand Duchy of Baden after the Fourth Peace of Pressburg (1805).

In 1844 a train station was built.

The modern spelling of the name was only decided upon in 1938.

== Coat of arms ==
The oldest known seal dates back to the 1830s. It consists of a birds foot with three fore-talons and one hind talon on a red background.

== Bibliography ==
- Mazure, M.Adeline.: One Step and then Another. Franciscan Sisters of the Sacred Heart, 1866–1971. Library of Congress Cataloging in Publication Data BX4358.5.M39 im Jahre 1973. ISBN 0-8199-0455-4
- Phillips, Marilyn: The Franciscan Sisters of the Sacred Heart: Their Patrimony and Historico-Canonical Status. Dissertation Saint Paul University, Ottawa, Canada 1988.
- Eugen Weber: Ortssippenbuch des Dorfes Önsbach in Baden. Önsbacher Familien des achtzehnten, neunzehnten und zwanzigsten Jahrhunderts; 1700–1850. Lahr-Dinglingen: Albert Köbele Nachfolger 2004: 108
