= Kappelrodeck =

- Municipality
- Coat of arms

- Location of Kappelrodeck within Ortenaukreis district
- Interactive map of Kappelrodeck
- Location within Germany Location within Baden-Württemberg
- Coordinates: 48°35′28″N 08°07′03″E
- Country: Germany
- State: Baden-Württemberg
- Admin. region: Freiburg
- District: Ortenaukreis
- Subdivisions: 2 Ortsteile

Government
  - Mayor (2017–25): Stefan Hattenbach

Area
  - Total: 17.93 km^{2} (6.92 sq mi)
- Elevation: 220 m (720 ft)

Population (2025-12-31)
  - Total: 6,221
  - Density: 347.0/km^{2} (898.6/sq mi)
- Time zone: UTC+01:00 (CET)
  - Summer (DST): UTC+02:00 (CEST)
- Postal codes: 77873–77876
- Dialling codes: 07842
- Vehicle registration: OG, BH, KEL, LR, WOL
- Website: www.kappelrodeck.de

Kappelrodeck (Low Alemannic: Kabbl) is a town in Western Baden-Württemberg, Germany and belongs to the district of Ortenau. It is located at the western hillslope of the Black Forest in the valley Achertal. It is about 20 kilometres to the north of Offenburg and about 20 kilometres to the south of Baden-Baden. In clear weather, the city of Strasbourg in France can be seen which is roughly 25 kilometres to the west of Kappelrodeck.

== History ==
Kappelrodeck was mentioned as A Capelle apud Rodecke in a document dated 1349. The town part Waldulm was documented a 100 years prior in 1244. The name relates to a chapel that was located below the castle Rodeck. Initially, Kappelrodeck was part of the land controlled by the prince-bishop of Strasbourg. During the Thirty Years' War and the French revolution, Kappelrodeck suffered from cruelties by every side. In 1803, Kappelrodeck was transferred to the house of Baden. In 1898, it was connected to the railway system. During the two world wars, the town itself was spared. After the second world war, it became part of the French zone.

== Demographics ==
Population development:

Year	Inhabitants
1990	5,644
2001	5,827
2011	5,760
2021	6,146

== See also ==
- Johann Nikolaus Weislinger
