= Bühlertal =

- Municipality
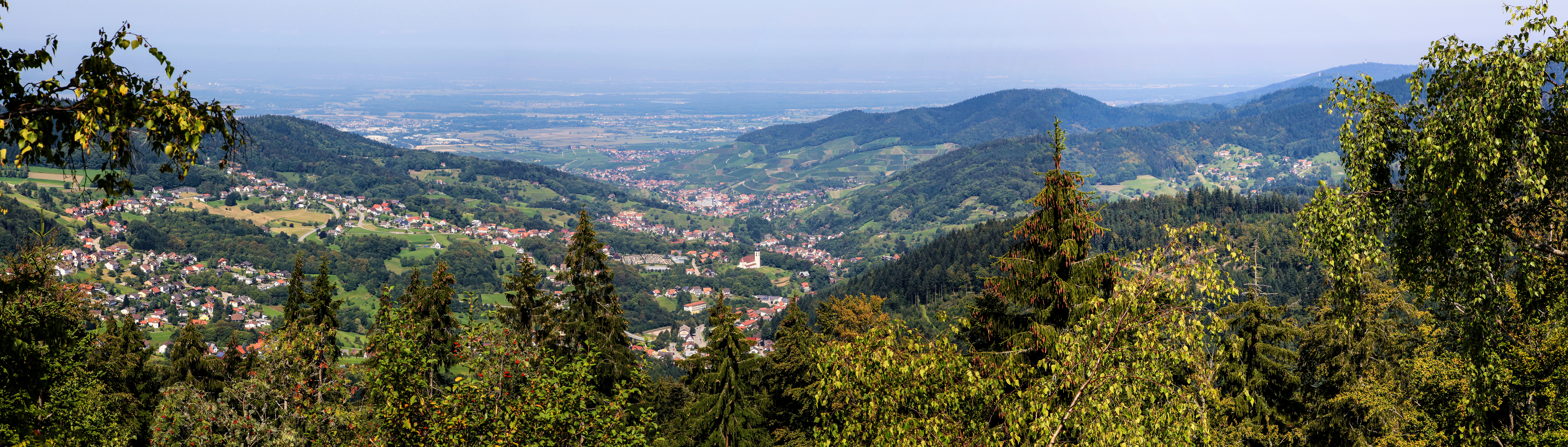
- Bühlertal

- Coat of arms

- Location of Bühlertal within Rastatt district
- Interactive map of Bühlertal
- Location within Germany Location within Baden-Württemberg
- Coordinates: 48°40′59″N 08°11′00″E
- Country: Germany
- State: Baden-Württemberg
- Admin. region: Karlsruhe
- District: Rastatt

Government
  - Mayor (2016–24): Hans-Peter Braun

Area
  - Total: 17.68 km^{2} (6.83 sq mi)
- Elevation: 196 m (643 ft)

Population (2025-12-31)
  - Total: 7,660
  - Density: 433/km^{2} (1,120/sq mi)
- Time zone: UTC+01:00 (CET)
  - Summer (DST): UTC+02:00 (CEST)
- Postal codes: 77830
- Dialling codes: 07223
- Vehicle registration: RA
- Website: www.buehlertal.de

Bühlertal is a municipality in the district of Rastatt in Baden-Württemberg in Germany.

== Geography ==
=== Geographic location ===
Bühlertal encompasses almost the entirety of the Bühlot Valley and its side valleys on the Western slope of the Northern Black Forest at the ridge to the Upper Rhine Valley from an elevation of 190 meters to 1000 meters above sea level.

=== Municipality ===
To the municipality of Buehlertal belong the Obertal (Upper Valley), the settlements Altenberg, Denni (now fused with the Obertal), Boosweg (joined with Obertal), Laengenberg, the hamlets Buchkopf, Buechelbach (joined with Butschenberg), Laube (bridging Untertal and Obertal), Liehenbach (fused with Untertal), Schafhof, Schoenbuech (joined with Obertal and Buchkopf), Schwarzwasen, Sessgass, Steckenhalt, Untertal, Wintereck and Wolfsbrunnen, the hamlets Eichwald, Freihoefen, Haaberg, Hatzenwoerth, Hirschbach, Hof, Hungerberg, Klotzberg, Lachmatt, Matthaeuser, Schmelz und Sickenwald, the farmsteads Butschenberg und Gertelbach, Grasiweg, Holzmatt, Immenstein, Kohlbergwiese, Mittelberg, Oberer Plaettig (Upper Plaettig), Wiedenfelsen und Wolfshuegel. The hamlet Mistgraben is defunct since 1492, but was mentioned in two baptism records around 1860 as a location.

== History ==
Oldest records about Buehlertal are from 1301. It belonged to the County of Eberstein. The Margraviate of Baden owned farms in Buehlertal since 1536. In 1688, the ownership of Bühlertal was transferred between the Earl of Eberstein and the Margrave of Baden. It belonged to the county of Bühl, which became the Landkreis Bühl. When the county (Landkreis) of Bühl was dissolved in 1973, Bühlertal became part of the county of Rastatt (Landkreis Rastatt).
