= Sasbach (Ortenau) =

- Municipality
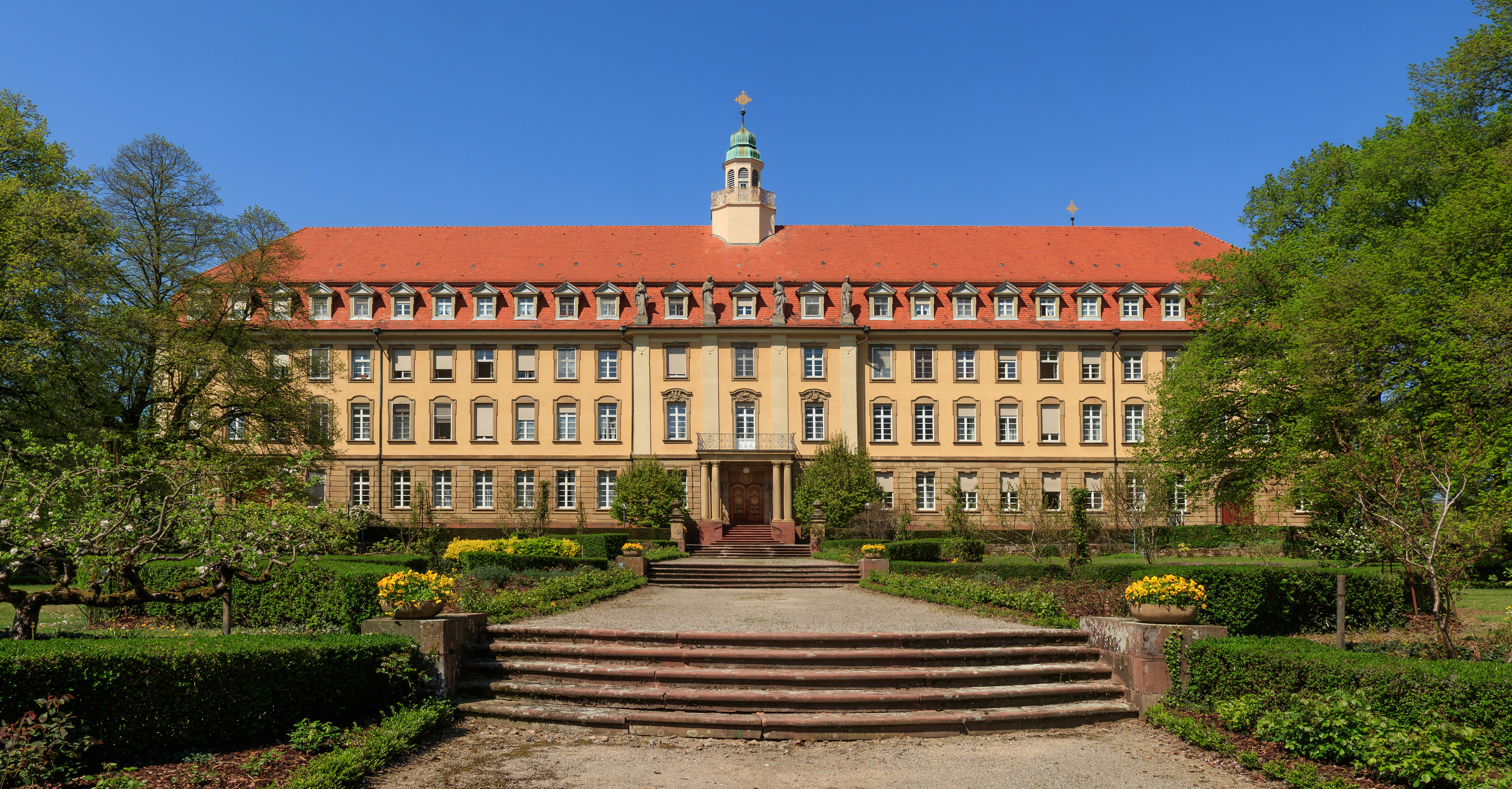
- Erlenbad nunnery

- Coat of arms

- Location of Sasbach within Ortenaukreis district
- Interactive map of Sasbach
- Location within Germany Location within Baden-Württemberg
- Coordinates: 48°38′18″N 08°05′30″E
- Country: Germany
- State: Baden-Württemberg
- Admin. region: Freiburg
- District: Ortenaukreis

Government
  - Mayor (2023–31): Dijana Opitz (CDU)

Area
  - Total: 16.74 km^{2} (6.46 sq mi)
- Elevation: 147 m (482 ft)

Population (2025-12-31)
  - Total: 5,340
  - Density: 319/km^{2} (826/sq mi)
- Time zone: UTC+01:00 (CET)
  - Summer (DST): UTC+02:00 (CEST)
- Postal codes: 77880
- Dialling codes: 07841
- Vehicle registration: OG, BH, KEL, LR, WOL
- Website: www.sasbach-ortenau.de

Sasbach is a municipality in the district of Ortenau in Western Baden-Württemberg, Germany.
