= Ottenhöfen im Schwarzwald =

- Municipality
- Coat of arms

- Location of Ottenhöfen im Schwarzwald within Ortenaukreis district
- Interactive map of Ottenhöfen im Schwarzwald
- Location within Germany Location within Baden-Württemberg
- Coordinates: 48°34′03″N 08°09′02″E
- Country: Germany
- State: Baden-Württemberg
- Admin. region: Freiburg
- District: Ortenaukreis

Government
  - Mayor (2019–27): Hans-Jürgen Decker

Area
  - Total: 25.26 km^{2} (9.75 sq mi)
- Elevation: 327 m (1,073 ft)

Population (2025-12-31)
  - Total: 3,040
  - Density: 120/km^{2} (312/sq mi)
- Time zone: UTC+01:00 (CET)
  - Summer (DST): UTC+02:00 (CEST)
- Postal codes: 77883
- Dialling codes: 07842
- Vehicle registration: OG, BH, KEL, LR, WOL
- Website: www.ottenhoefen.de

Ottenhöfen im Schwarzwald (German pronunciation: [ɔtn̩ˈhøːfn̩ ʔɪm ˈʃvaʁtsvalt], lit. 'Ottenhöfen in the Black Forest'; Low Alemannic: Oddeheefe) is a town in the district of Ortenau in Baden-Württemberg in Germany. Ottenhöfen is known for its mills, which can be discovered along the Mill Trail.
