= Bitexco Financial Tower =

Shopping mall, office, restaurant in district 1, Ho Chi Minh City

- Tháp Tài chính Bitexco, Tòa nhà Bitexco Financial
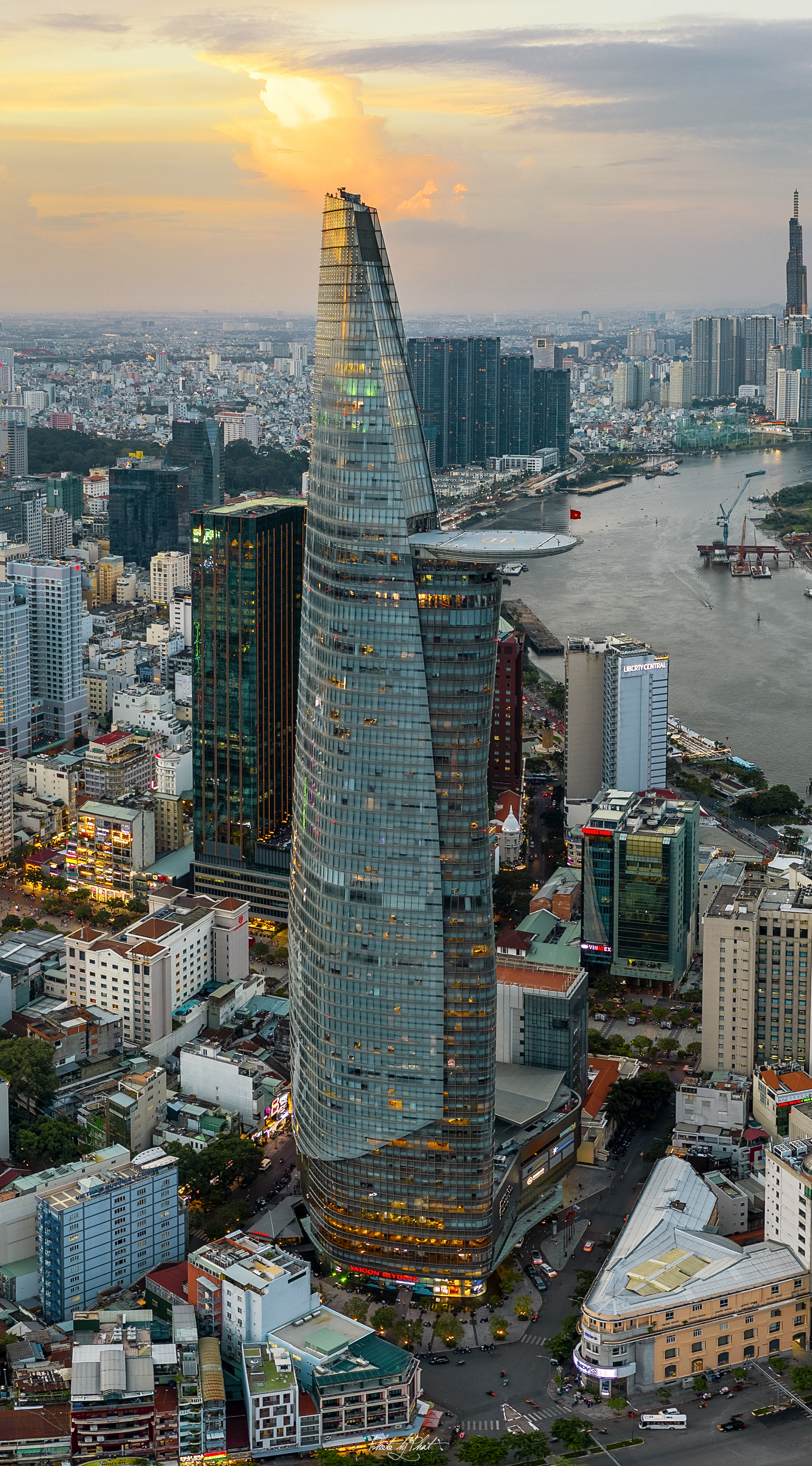
- Bitexco Financial Tower at dusk time in August 2019

Record height
- Tallest in Vietnam from 2010 to 2011^{[I]}
- Preceded by: Saigon Trade Center
- Surpassed by: Landmark 72

General information
- Status: Completed
- Type: Office (primary); Shopping mall Restaurant
- Architectural style: Neo-futurism
- Location: No. 2 Hải Triều Street; 36 Hồ Tùng Mậu Street; 43–45 Ngô Đức Kế Street, Saigon, Ho Chi Minh City, Vietnam
- Coordinates: 10°46′18″N 106°42′16″E
- Groundbreaking: September 2005; 21 years ago
- Construction started: June 2007; 19 years ago
- Topped-out: 2010; 16 years ago
- Opening: 31 October 2010; 15 years ago
- Owner: Bitexco Group
- Operator: Turner International, DLS

Height
- Roof: 262.5 meters (861 ft)
- Top floor: 258.5 meters (848 ft)
- Observatory: 178 meters (584 ft) at Level 49

Technical details
- Floor count: 68 (and 3 basement floors)
- Floor area: 114,000 square metres (1,230,000 sq ft)
- Lifts/elevators: 16

Design and construction
- Architects: Carlos Zapata Studio, Jean-Marie Duthilleul and Etienne Tricaud
- Architecture firm: AREP
- Developer: Bitexco Group
- Engineer: DSA Engineering (M&E)
- Structural engineer: Leslie E. Robertson Associates RLLP and VNCC
- Main contractor: Hyundai Engineering and Construction

Other information
- Parking: 2 basements (B1 + B2): 13,000 square metres (140,000 sq ft), around 600 cars and 1,300 motorbikes
- Public transit: L2 Hàm Nghi station; L11 Nguyễn Huệ station, Tôn Thất Đạm station (planned)

Website
- Bitexco Financial Tower

Bitexco Financial Tower (Vietnamese: Tháp Tài chính Bitexco) is a skyscraper in Financial District, Saigon, Ho Chi Minh City, Vietnam (next to the city's state treasury). At its completion in 2010, it became the tallest building in Vietnam and kept this status until January 2011, when it was surpassed by Keangnam Hanoi Landmark Tower. With 68 floors above ground and three basements, the building has a height of 262.5 metres (861 ft), making it the second tallest building in the city, fourth tallest in Vietnam, and the 412th tallest in the world, as of May 2022.

The tower is owned by Bitexco Group, a Vietnamese multi-industry corporation, with a focus on real estate development. The building also houses the Ho Chi Minh City representative office of Bitexco Group, while its headquarters are in Hanoi.

The tower was designed by Carlos Zapata, Design Principal and Founder of Carlos Zapata Studio, with AREP as architect of record. Designed by Carlos Zapata, drew inspiration for this skyscraper's unique shape from Vietnam's national flower, the Lotus.

The tower was officially inaugurated on 31 October 2010. In 2013, CNN named the Bitexco Financial Tower one of the 25 Great Skyscraper Icons of Construction. In 2015, Thrillist named the Bitexco Financial Tower the #2 Coolest Skyscraper in the World.

== History ==
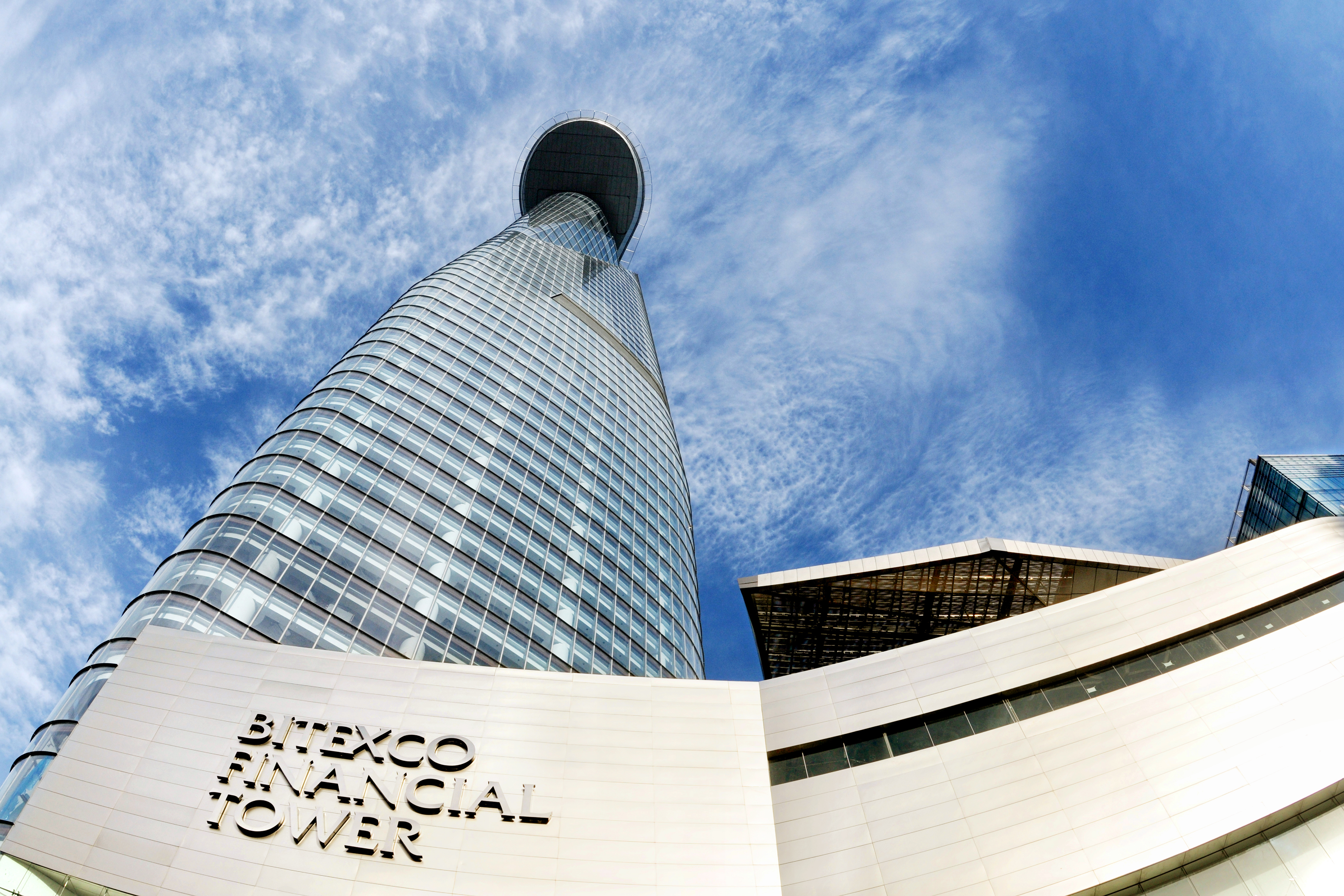
Ground view of the tower.

The groundbreaking ceremony was held in September 2005. Two years later, in June 2007, construction of the tower started. The tower topped out in mid-2010 and had its inauguration ceremony on 31 October 2010.

=== Reception ===
Amongst other international awards and recognitions, on 30 November 2011, Bitexco Financial Tower received the "Excellence in structure engineering awards 2011" in the "International structure over $100 million" category. NCSEA.

=== Fireworks show ===
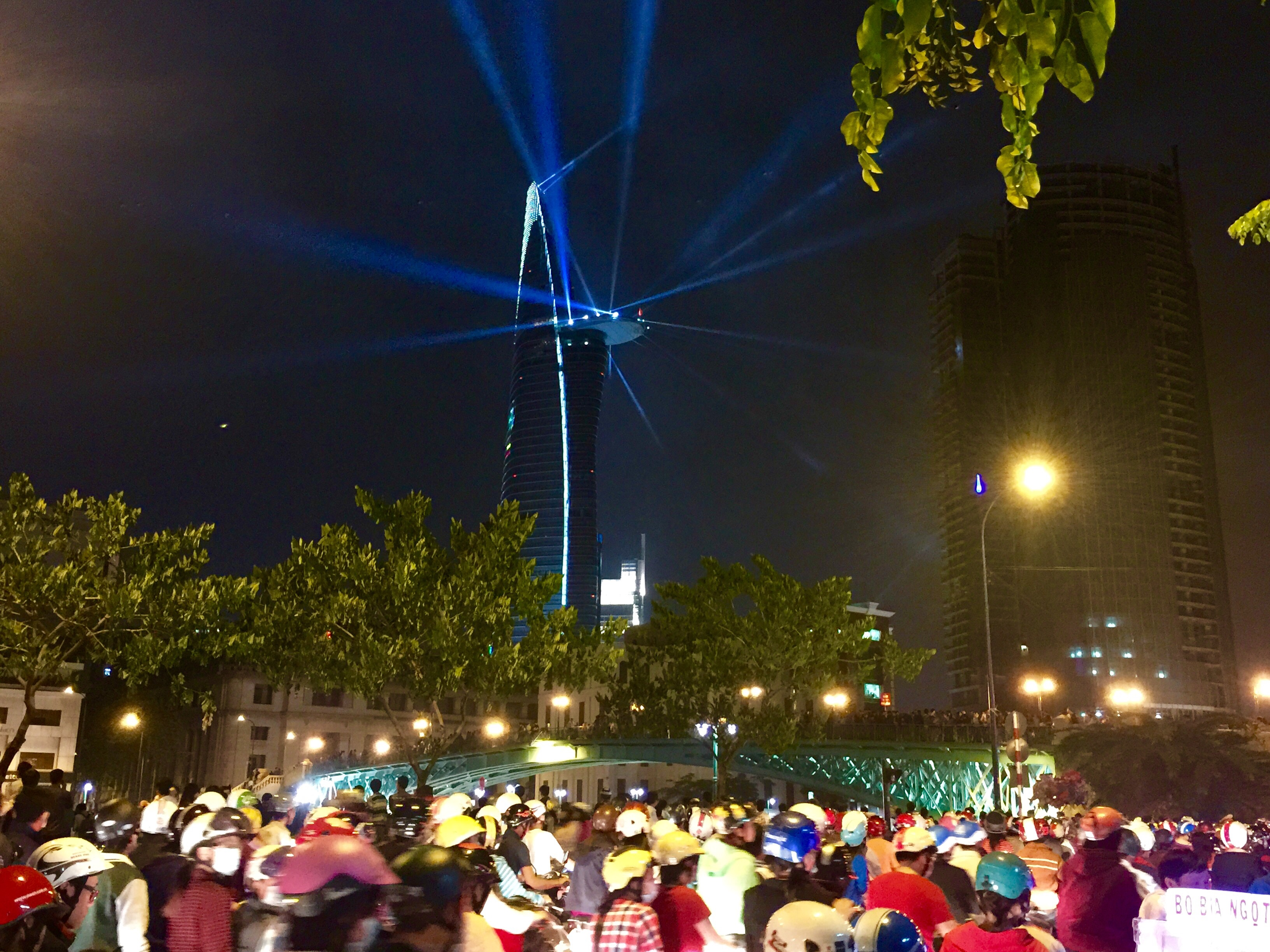
The laser light show on the tower helipad, seen from Vân Đồn Quay, Khánh Hội

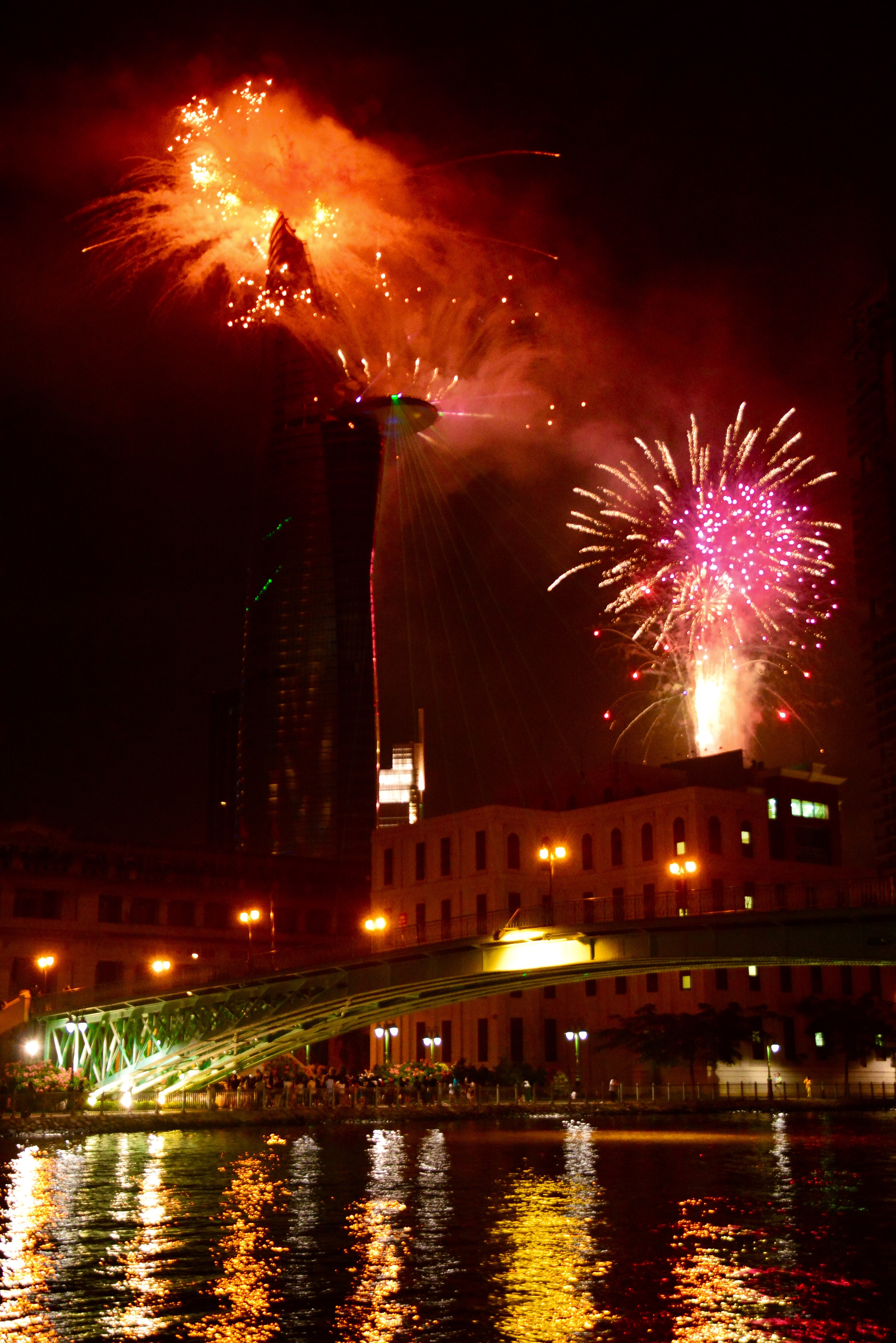
The fireworks display on the tower along with the nearby Bitexco Office Building and Tân Hải Long 3 Hotel, seen from Khánh Hội

The Bitexco Financial Tower was chosen to celebrate high-altitude fireworks along with the nearby Bitexco Officie Building on Nguyễn Huệ Boulevard, also owned by Bitexco Group; and the Tân Hải Long 3 Hotel (now is Amanaki Boutique Saigon Hotel) and laser display location for the 2015 New Year's Eve and the 40th Anniversary of the Reunification Day. Different from regular years, where the firework displays are shown at the roof of Saigon River Tunnel.

The fireworks display was held at the 52nd Floor, the helipad of the tower; and on the 68th floor, top of the tower. It was believed to have firework and laser lights show in the arguation day; however, only the laser light show occurred.

== Facilities ==
Bitexco Financial Tower is a mixed-use project which includes office, retail, F&B and entertainment space. The tower has around 38,000 square metres of office space, from 7th to 65th floors, and a five-storey retail podium, Icon68, including a food court (which has closed following the COVID-19 pandemic) and seven screen multiplex BHD Cineplex cinema with around 10,000 square metres from Ground to 4th Floors. At Floor 49, at height around 178 metres, there is an observation deck open to the public.

Vietnam's first non-rooftop helipad is on the 52nd floor of the tower, it extends 22 meters out from the main structure and strong enough to carry a helicopter up to 3 tons of weight.

=== Key design features ===
- Grand Atrium Lobby

The lobby boasts a large, open space with high ceilings, designed to maximize natural light through a surrounding system of tempered glass walls. This area serves as the main transit and navigation hub of the building, connecting the entrances to the office block, shopping center, Saigon Skydeck observation desk ticket counter, and parking area of the building. The lobby interior utilizes modern materials such as high-quality stone cladding and metal, combined with a high-powered lighting system to serve the daily flow of visitors. The area outside the lobby entrance is bordered by an artificial landscape water trench.

- Wall & Façade system

The glass from Belgium was purchased and shipped to China for manufacturing. Once in China the low iron heat strengthened glass was cut into 6,000 individual panels. Each panel is double glazed with the outside layer being 8 mm thick and internal air space of 12 mm and an internal panel of 8 mm. Finally the glass was shipped to Ho Chi Minh City and the panels were installed as the building grew higher. Each of the 6,000 sleek glass panels enveloping the Bitexco Financial Tower is individually cut to unique specifications because each floor is unique, giving the building its eye-catching shape.

- Helipad

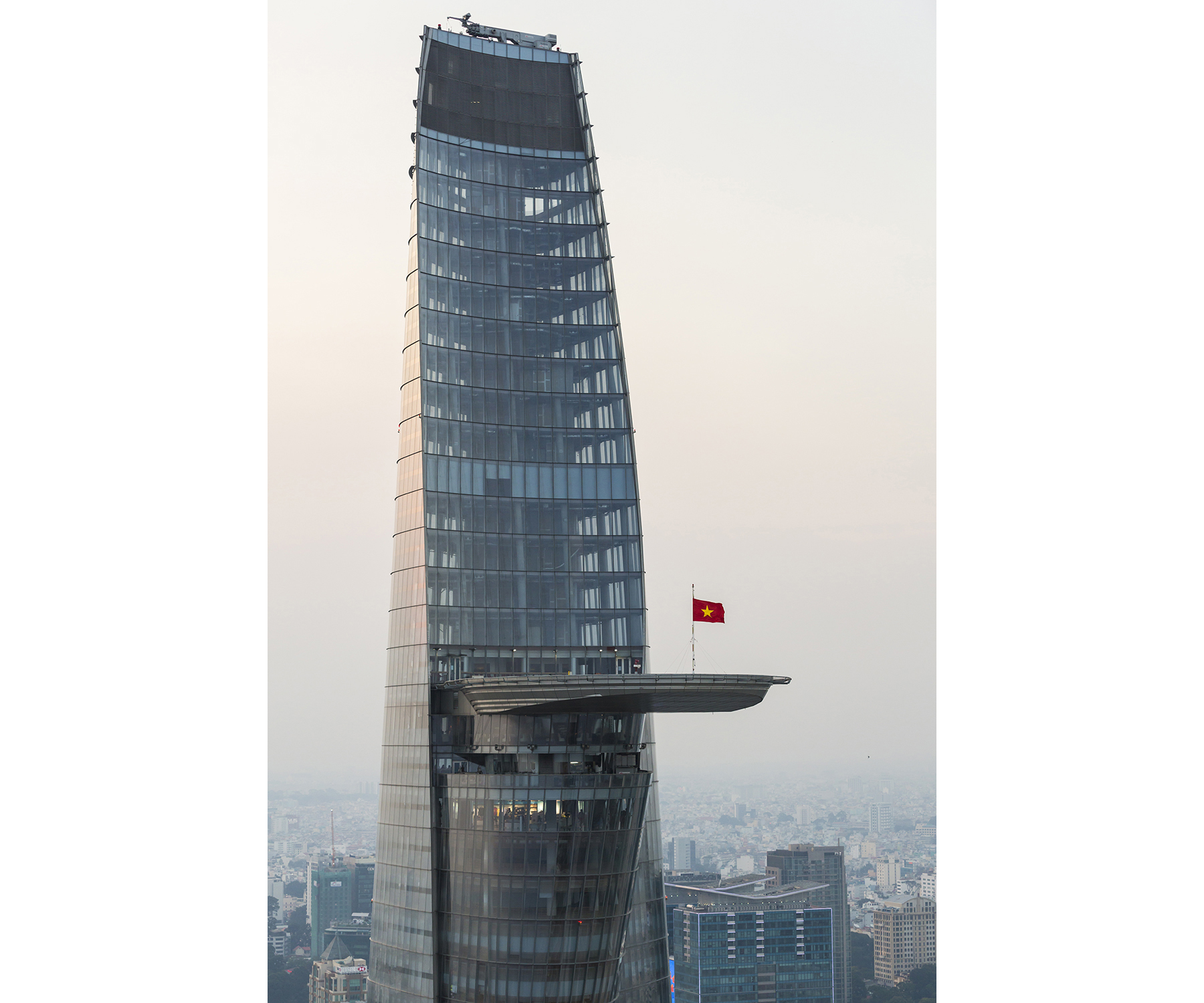
Bitexco Financial Tower Helipad

Located on the southern side of the Bitexco Financial Tower, the helipad cantilevers from the 52nd floor and resembles a blossoming lotus bud.

Constructed from more than 250 tons of structural steel and requiring 4,000 ultra-strong bolts to hold it together, the helipad took almost a year to plan, build and coordinate before it could be hoisted to its place at height around 191 meters. Its installation alone took about two months.

Most of the materials used to construct the helipad were purchased from Europe and South Korea and the manufacturing took place in Bugang, an area in Greater Seoul. Once the fabrication of the helipad was completed, it was shipped to Vietnam.

To ensure proper assembly, the entire helipad was pre-assembled on the ground of a factory in Đồng Nai Province in Vietnam – a process that took about three weeks.

When the helipad was ready to be lifted into place, the roads surrounding the southern face of the Bitexco Financial Tower were closed for safety reasons and the helipad was transported into the centre of District 1. The massive yet delicate operation of lifting the helipad began. It was lifted in parts and attached to the 52nd storey of the Bitexco Financial Tower, 191 meters above Ho Chi Minh City.

- Vertical Transportation

Bitexco Financial Tower operates Otis double-deck elevators with specialised Compass System which is the most modern and advanced elevator system in Vietnam. With speed up to 7 meters per second, it was the fastest lift system in South East Asia at the time of installation. There are 3 separate elevator zones servicing the tower with 14 passenger and 2 service lifts, plus further lifts to serve the retail and parking areas.

- Saigon Skydeck on 49th floor

The Saigon Skydeck soft opened for visitors from overseas and domestically on 1 January 2011, officially opening in July that same year. The observation deck offers 360-degree panoramic views of Ho Chi Minh City, guest facilities and a gift shop. Saigon Skydeck opens daily and a ticket costs around $10.

View from the 52nd floor overlooking the helipad

=== Floor plan ===
The following is the breakdown of floors.

Floor	Use
66–68	Mechanical floors
60–65	Top Office Suites
58–60	The World of Heineken Bar
53–58	Top Office Suites
52	Helipad, EON Helibar
51	EON 51, Sorae Japanese restaurant & lounge
50	EON Cafe
49	Saigon Skydeck
7–48	Grade A Office
G–6	Icon68 Shopping Center
B1–B3	Parking

== Office demand in Ho Chi Minh City ==
Due to the rapid economic growth of Saigon in particular and dynamic economic development of Vietnam in general, the construction of office buildings in Ho Chi Minh City has been rapid. Bitexco Financial Tower has fulfilled the need for international standard office space in this city. The unit price of prime grade offices now in Saigon can be up to US$40/metre square/per month or more, for the most demanded space. Since the opening up and growth of the Vietnamese economy, both foreign and domestic enterprises have invested significantly in the construction of high-rise buildings in Vietnam. Before 1995, Saigon city centre featured generally French Colonial and other rather basic low-lying buildings. Since then, the city has seen a dramatic increase in high-rise buildings as the country has often maintained an average 8–8.5% annual GDP growth rate. Saigon, the country's economic hub, has achieved 12% GDP growth rate, at some times, although this has been dampened in recent years by the general world recession but not as greatly as has been felt in other parts of the world.

Some specific tenants include many multi-national companies such as Bitexco Energy, Samsung Vina Electronics, TMF Vietnam, Ernst & Young Vietnam, Murphy Oil, Mastercard Asia/Pacific Pte Ltd., Resona Bank, Viet Capital Securities Joint Stock (VietCap)…

== Icon68 Shopping Center ==
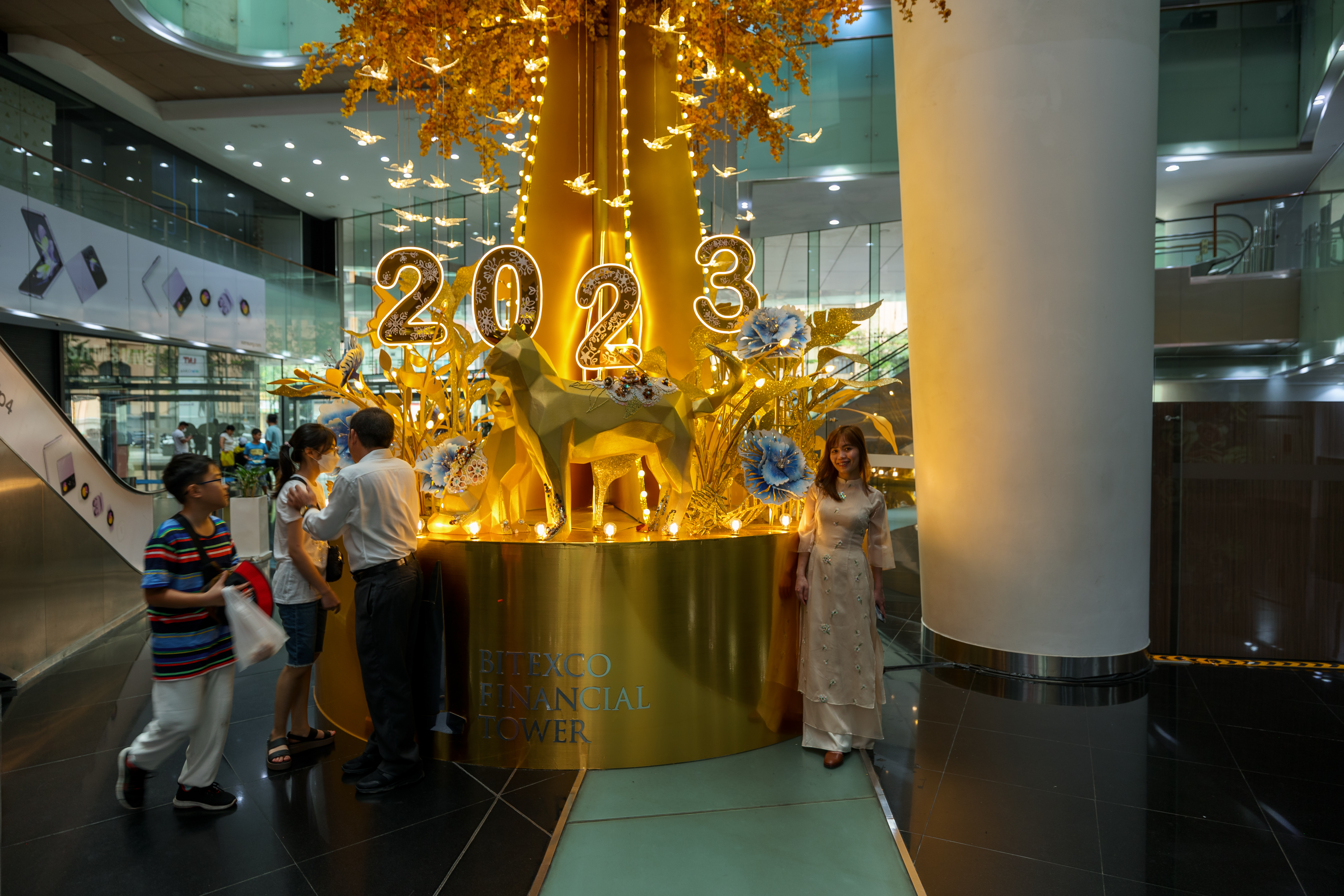
Icon68 in Tết 2023 with Samsung 68 Experience Store

The 6-story podium retail area of the building is officially known as Icon68 Shopping Center or shorten as Icon68, first opened during the holiday of April 30 and Labour Day (May 1) in 2013. Since its opening, a variety of notable tenants opened their stores here are: Fujifilm, Mango, Pedro, Topshop, Topman, Charles & Keith, Converse, Vans, Pierre Cardin, etc. However, after the COVID-19 pandemic in Vietnam, most of them had left the center, just some anchor tenants still stay are Samsung 68, Watsons and Adidas; the latter was stayed after the pandemic but left shortly then and the store is now replaced by Starbucks Reserve.

The BHD Star Bitexco cinema was on the 3rd and 4th floor of the Bitexco Financial Tower and officially ceased operations on April 1, 2022.

=== Food Creative, renovation and restructuring ===
Food Creative is the name of the building food court at Floor 4, it brings together many popular national brands and fast-food chains, serving a large number of office workers in the building and surrounding area. Typical brands were here include: KFC, Lotteria, Phở 24, Bún Chả Tô, Chấm Đỏ, Sukiya Tokyo (Japanese beef rice bowl), Bamboo Dimsum, Phúc Long, Highlands Coffee, Royal Tea, Elle Café. However, most of these brands are also no longer stay in the building.

To address the issue of vacant retail spaces, the building management launched the Icon68 Shopping Center renovation project at the Bitexco Financial Tower. This comprehensive upgrade strategy aims to meet the growing demands of high-end customers and reposition the iconic building. Instead of maintaining the old mass-market shopping model, Icon68 is shifting strongly towards the luxury segment, focusing on high-end food and beverage services (F&B), upscale restaurants, and unique art experience spaces. To realize this goal, the investor, Bitexco, collaborated with many major international corporations and personally invited architect Carlos Zapata (the building's designer) to return and provide suitable structural transformation solutions. The upgrade process was implemented in a phased manner starting from Q1/2023, allowing the building to continuously welcome new high-end brands without any disruption to operations or permanent closure, contrary to false rumors. Some new brands opened recently are, according to the management are: Alluvia Vietnam Chocolate (4F), Cửu Vân Long Premium Buffet, Highlands Coffee (re-opened; 4F), Flyover Vietnam (2F) & Flyover Starry Sky Art Museum (4F), Sushi Nokando (both at 2F), Starbucks Reserve (Ground and 1st Floor). Some other F&B brands remain stable or were opened earlier are Haidilao, Ootoya Sushi. The Café Terrace (previously Elle Café) at the Ground Floor is now replaced by RuNam Bistro.

== HCMC Skyrun ==
Since 2011, Bitexco Financial Tower has hosted the annual HCMC Skyrun, Vietnam's longest running stair climbing race. The race starts on the ground floor and finishes at the helipad on the 52nd floor. In 2011, Thomas Dold of Germany ran up in a time of 4 minutes 51 seconds, setting the men's course record. Italy's Valentina Belotti, climbed in a time of 6 minutes 19 seconds, setting the women's course record.

== Gallery ==
Bitexco Financial Tower's 3D model.

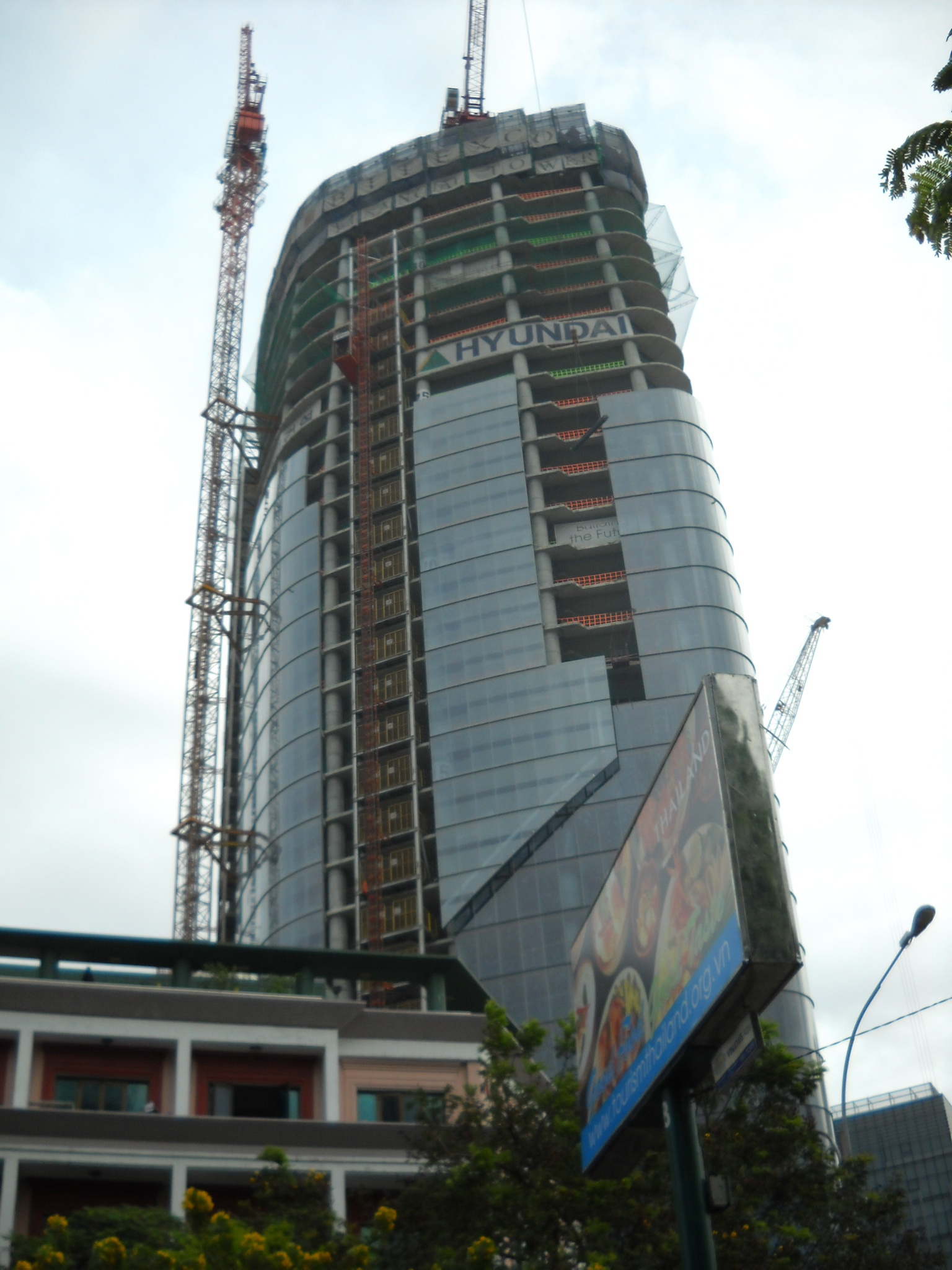
23 November 2009

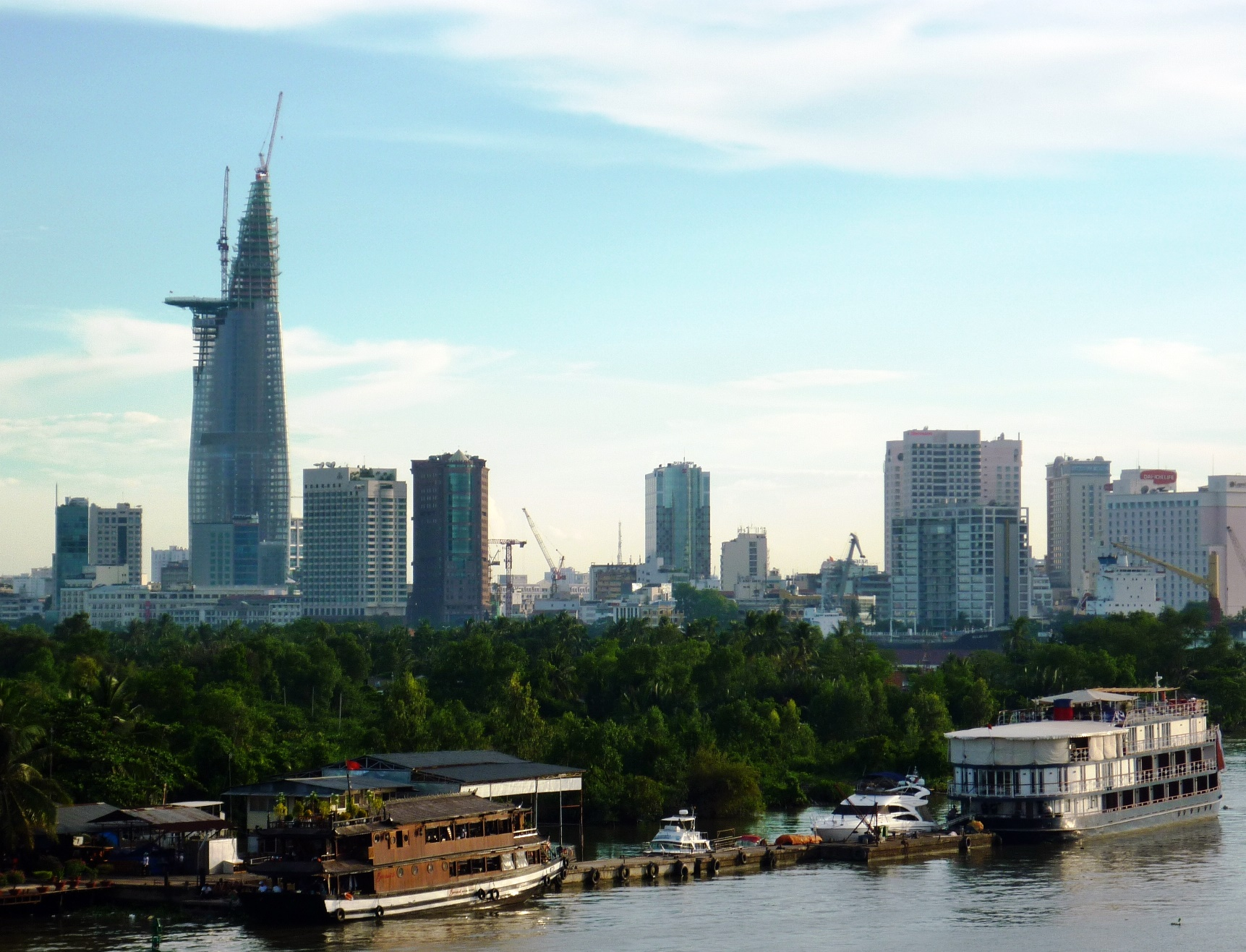
Bitexco Financial Tower under construction in June 2010

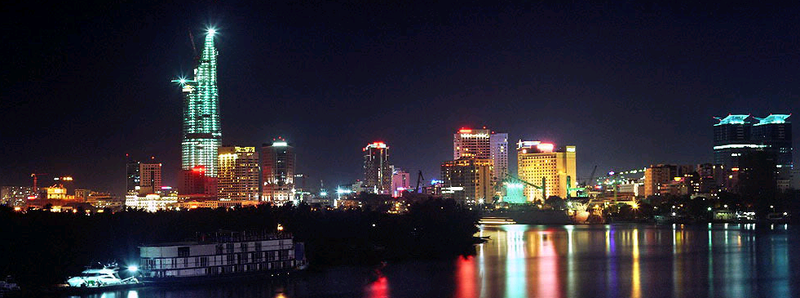
Bitexco Financial Tower under construction in June 2010 at night

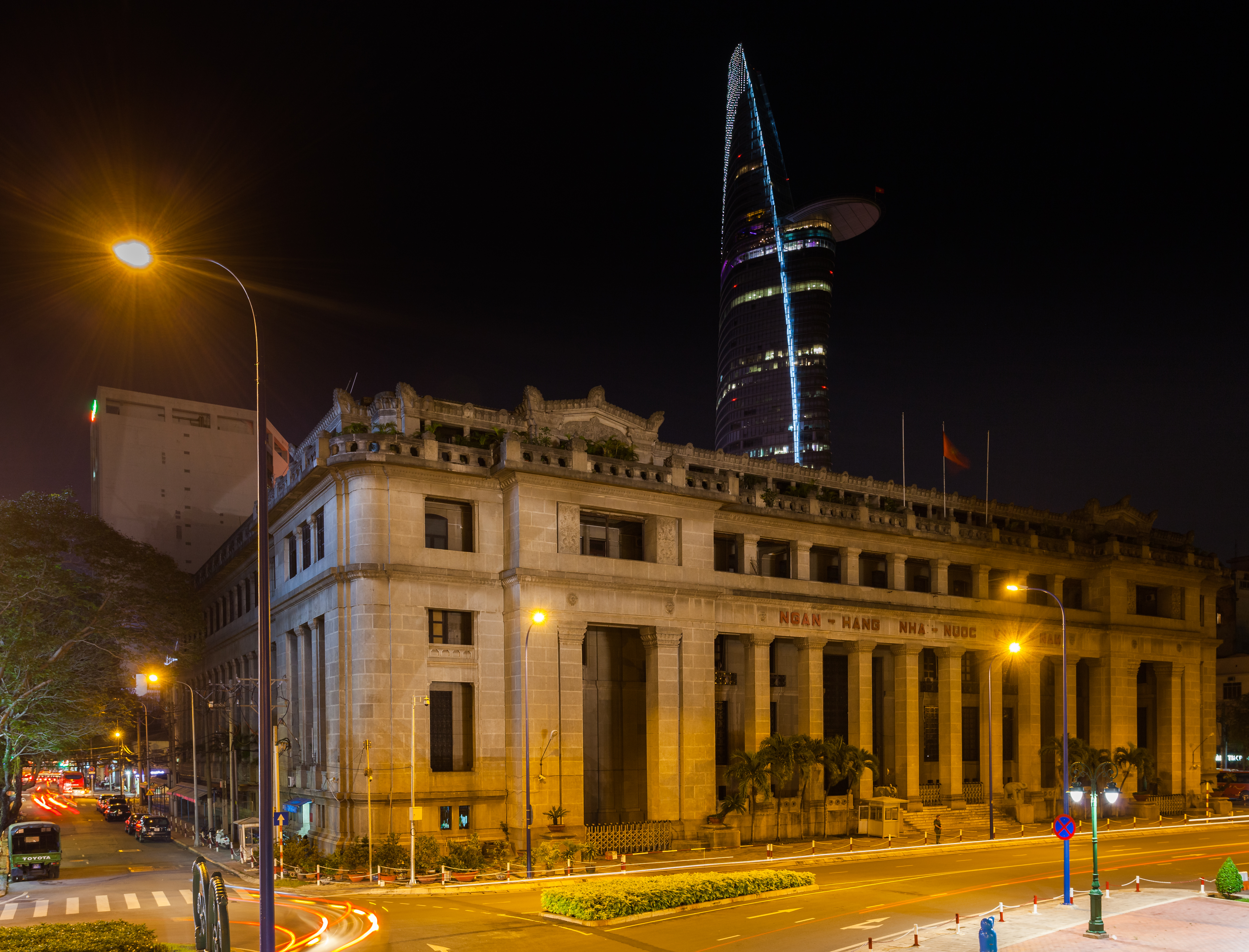
Bitexco with State Bank Region 2 Branch seen from Mống Bridge

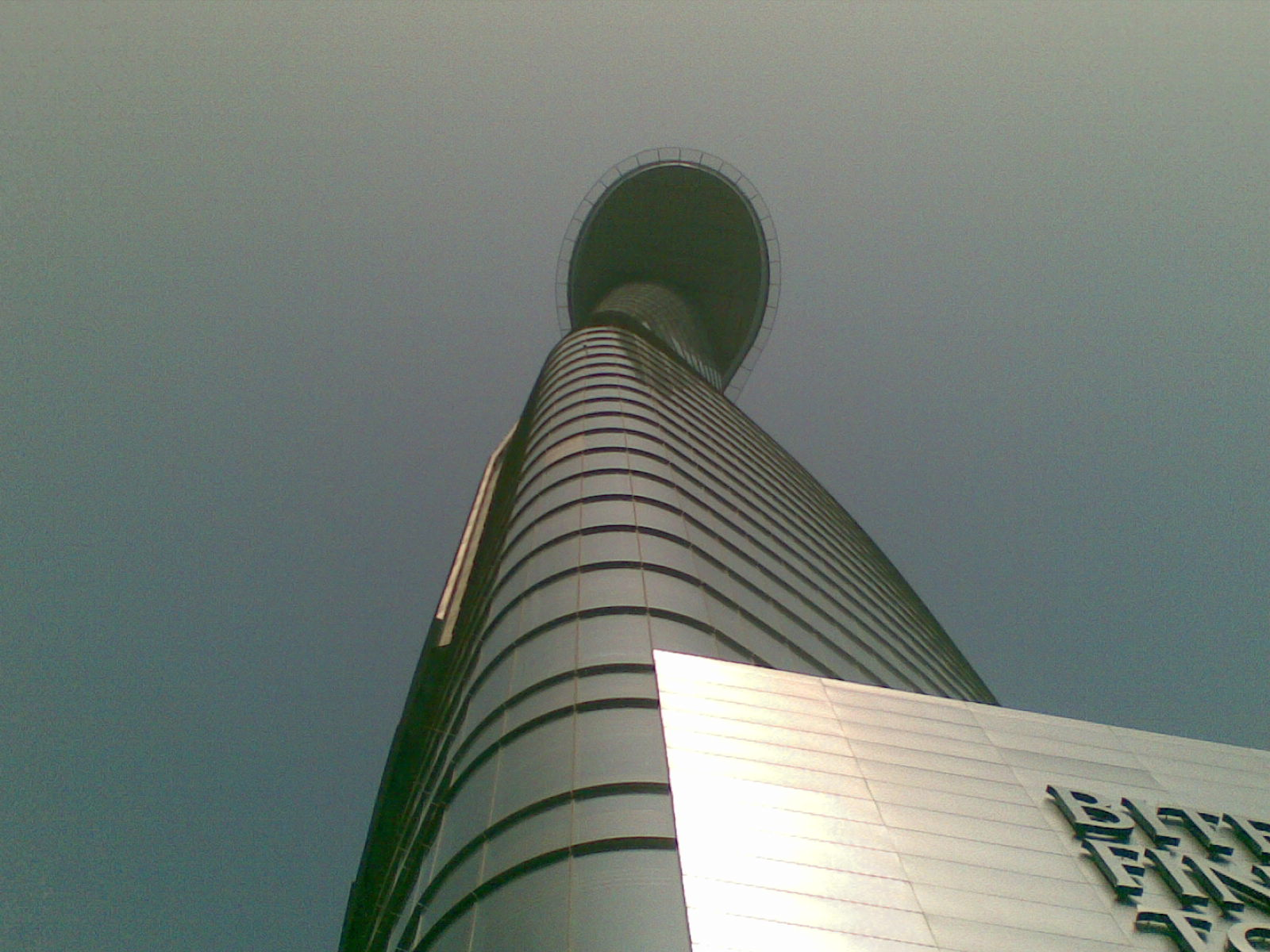
2 February 2011

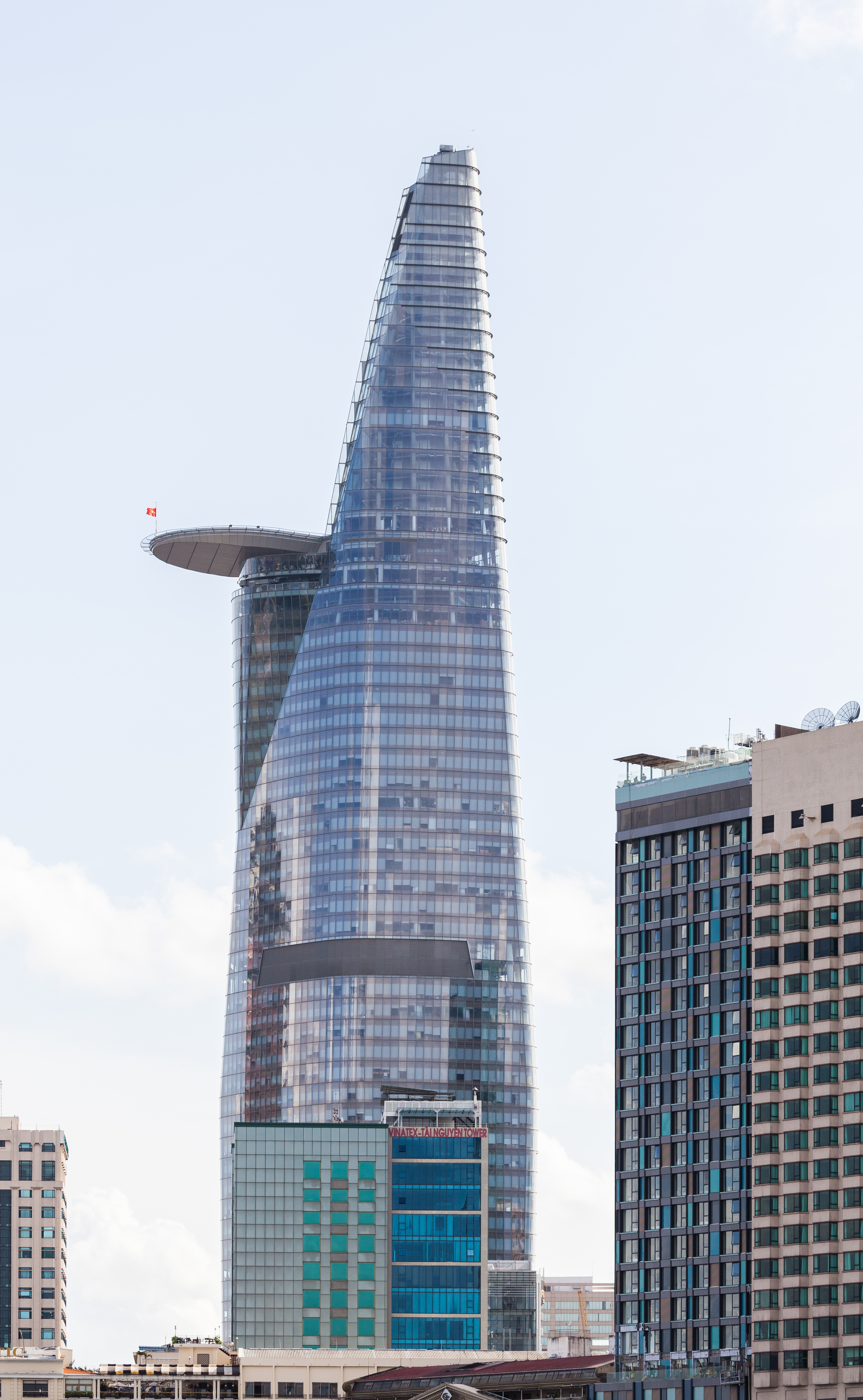
14 August 2013

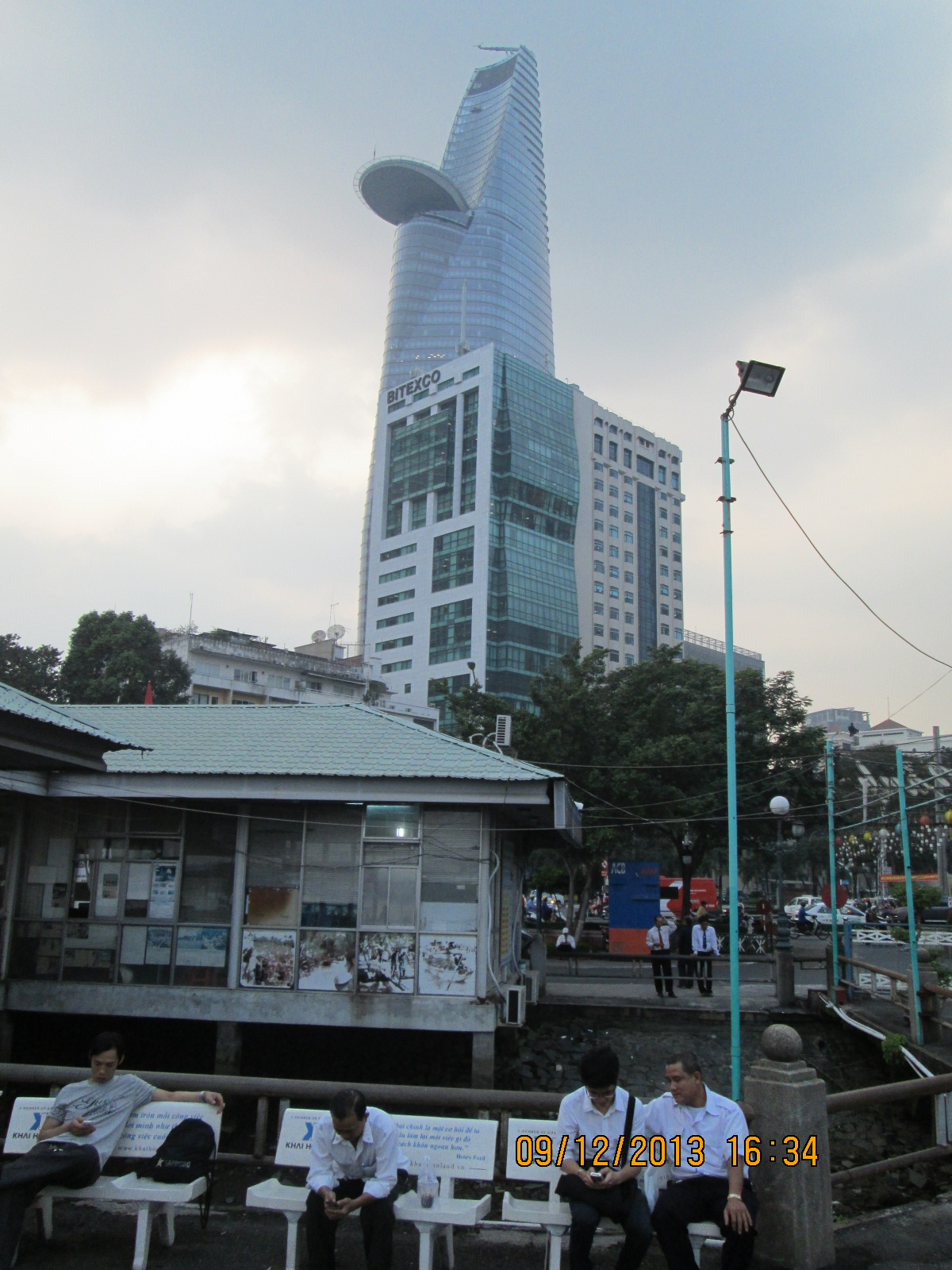
Bitexco Financial Tower as seen from Bạch Đằng Quay

Bitexco Financial Tower seen from Ngô Đức Kế Street on Mê Linh Square

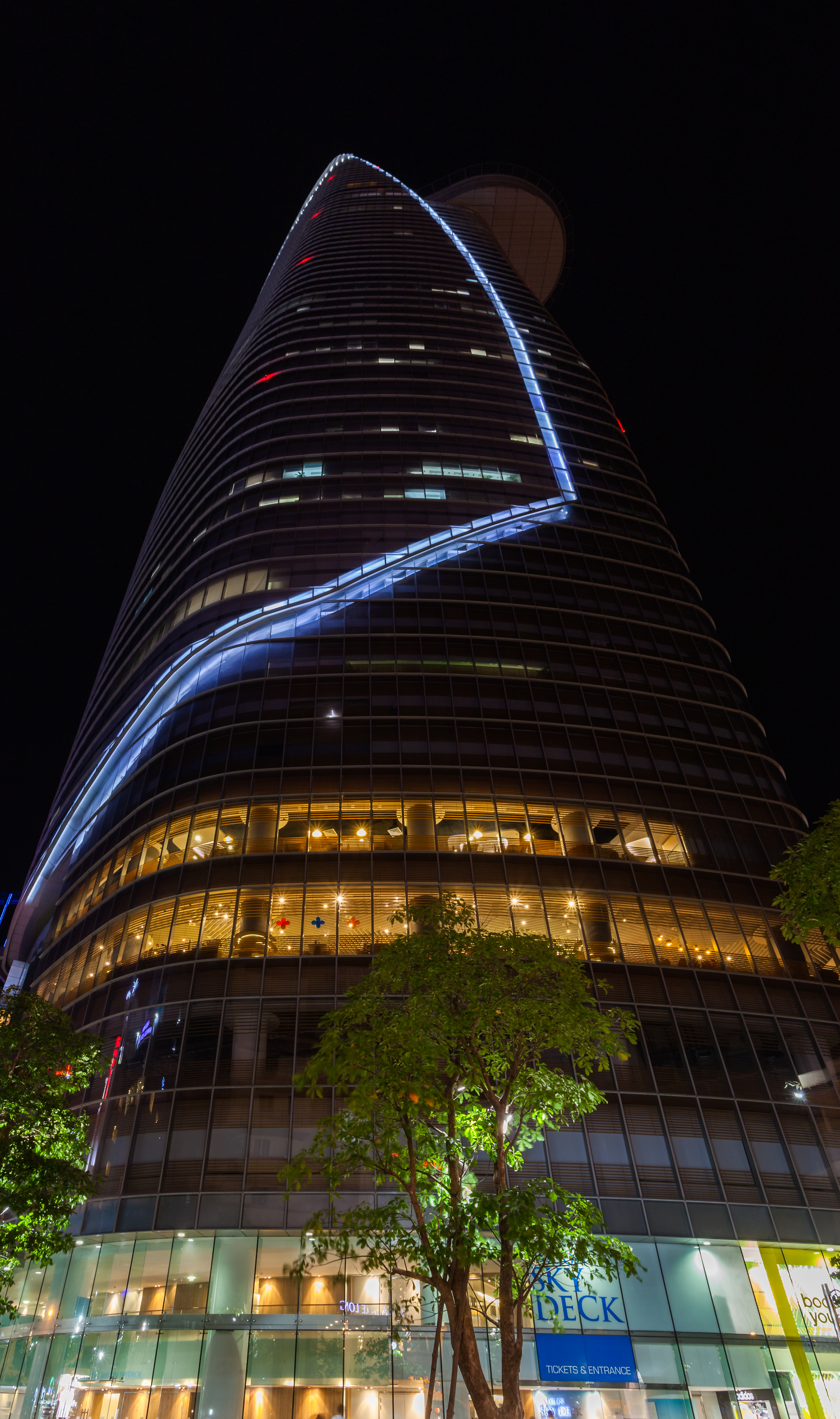
View from below at night in August 2014

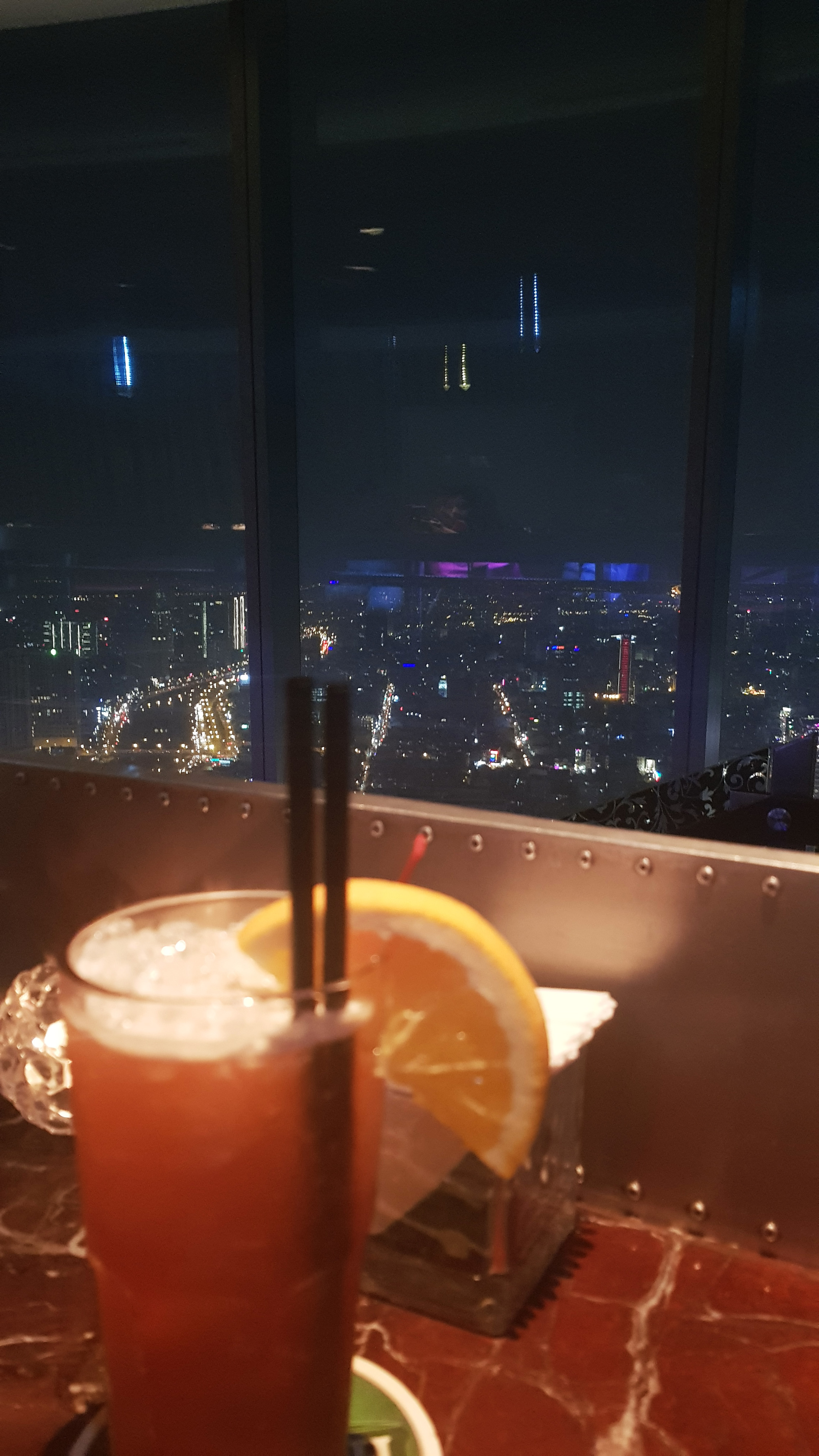
Bar on the 52nd floor of the Bitexco Financial Tower

Elle Café at Ground Floor (now is Runam Bistro)

== See also ==
- List of tallest buildings in Vietnam
- Saigon Times Square
- Menara Telekom
- Saigon Centre
- Landmark 81

Records
Preceded by Saigon Trade Center	Tallest Building in Vietnam; 2010–2011; 262.5 m	Succeeded by Keangnam Landmark 72
Preceded by Saigon Trade Center	Tallest Building in Ho Chi Minh City; 2010–2019; 262.5 m	Succeeded by Landmark 81
