= Ringsheim/Europa-Park station =

Railway station in Ortenaukreis, Germany

Ringsheim Europa-Park
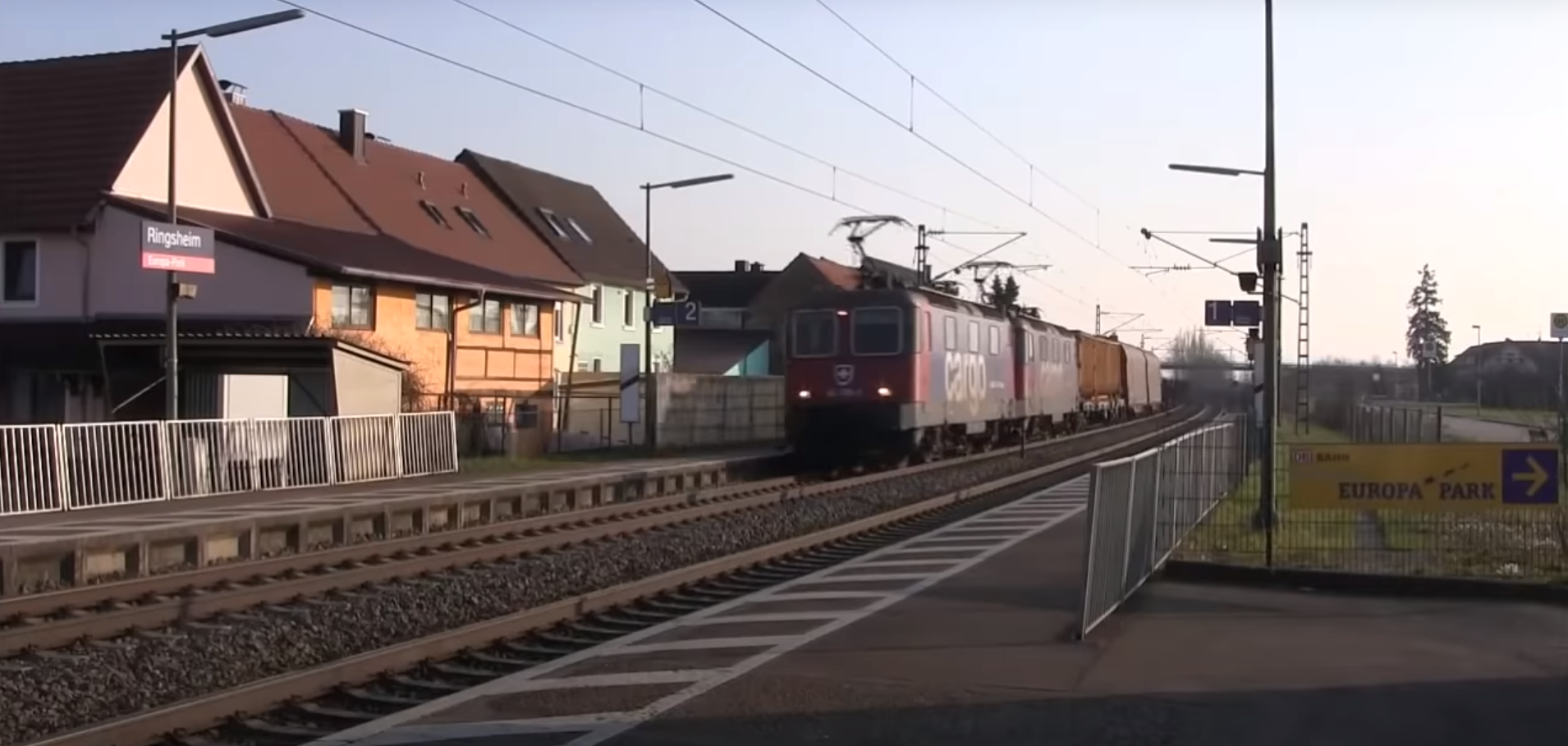

General information
- Location: Germany
- Coordinates: 48°14′55.71″N 7°46′23.04″E
- Line: Mannheim–Karlsruhe–Basel railway
- Platforms: 2
- Tracks: 2
- Train operators: DB Regio Baden-Württemberg; DB Fernverkehr; SNCF Voyages Deutschland
- Connections: 7231 (to Europa-Park), 7200

History
- Opened: 1869; 157 years ago
- Former names: Ringsheim (until 2021)

Services
Preceding station	SNCF	Following station
Lahr (Schwarzw) towards Paris-Est	TGV inOui	Freiburg Hbf Terminus
Lahr (Schwarzw) towards Bordeaux	TGV inOui	Freiburg Hbf Terminus
Preceding station	DB Fernverkehr	Following station
Karlsruhe Hbf towards Frankfurt (Main) Hbf	ECE 85	Freiburg Hbf towards Milano Centrale
Preceding station	DB Regio Baden-Württemberg	Following station
Orschweier towards Karlsruhe Hbf	RE 7	Herbolzheim (Breisgau) towards Basel Bad Bf
Orschweier towards Offenburg	RB 26	Herbolzheim (Breisgau) towards Freiburg Hbf
Location

Ringsheim/Europa-Park station is a railway station in Ringsheim, Germany on the Mannheim–Karlsruhe–Basel railway. It is the closest railway station to Europa-Park and shuttle buses carry passengers the 4 kilometres (2.5 miles) distance to the park.

The name of the station was changed from Ringsheim to Ringsheim/Europa-Park in December 2021.

In June 2021, daily EuroCityExpress trains between Frankfurt and Milan started serving the station. On 11 December 2022, daily TGV services from Paris to Freiburg started serving Ringsheim/Europa-Park, as well as weekly services from Bordeaux.

== Services ==
- Rail services in the 2023 timetable

=== Long distance services ===
Line	Route	Interval
ECE 85	Frankfurt Hbf – Mannheim Hbf – Karlsruhe Hbf – Baden-Baden – Ringsheim/Europa-Park - Freiburg Hbf – Basel Bad Bf – Basel SBB – Olten – Luzern – Arth-Goldau – Bellinzona – Lugano – Chiasso – Como S. Giovanni – Monza – Milano Centrale	one per day
TGV inOui	Paris-Est - Strasbourg-Ville - Offenburg - Lahr (Schwarzw) - Ringsheim/Europa-Park - Freiburg Hbf	Return daily
TGV inOui	Bordeaux St-Jean - Angoulême - Poitiers - St-Pierre-des-Corps - Massy TGV - Marne La Vallée-Chessy - Champagne-Ardenne TGV - Meuse TGV - Lorraine TGV - Strasbourg-Ville - Offenburg - Lahr - Ringsheim/Europa-Park - Freiburg Hbf	week end

=== Regional services ===
Line	Route	Interval
RE 7	Karlsruhe Hbf - Rastatt - Baden-Baden - Bühl(Baden) - Achern - Renchen - Appenweier - Offenburg - Lahr (Schwarzwald) – Ringsheim/Europa-Park - Emmendingen – Freiburg Hbf – Schallstadt - Bad Krozingen - Heitersheim – Müllheim (Baden) – Auggen - Schliengen - Bad Bellingen - Rheinweiler - Kleinkems - Istein - Efringen-Kirchen - Eimeldingen - Haltingen - Weil am Rhein - Basel Bad Bf (– Basel SBB)	Hourly
RB 26	Offenburg - Friesenheim(Baden) - Lahr(Schwarzw) - Orschweier - Ringsheim/Europa-Park - Herbolzheim(Breisg) - Kenzingen - Riegel-Malterdingen - Köndringen - Teningen-Mundingen - Emmendingen - Kollmarsreute - Denzlingen - Gundelfingen(Breisgau) - Freiburg Hbf (- Ebringen - Schallstadt - Norsingen - Bad Krozingen - Heitersheim - Buggingen - Müllheim (Baden) - Neuenburg (Baden))	Hourly
