= AREP =

AREP Architecture, Research, Engagement, Post-Carbon
- Company type: Société anonyme
- Industry: engineering, technical studies
- Founded: January 1997
- Headquarters: Paris, France
- Key people: Jean-Marie Duthilleul, Étienne Tricaud, Raphaël Ménard
- Number of employees: 1000 (2023)
- Parent: SNCF
- Website: www.arep.fr

AREP (French: Architecture Recherche Engagement Post-carbone, "Architecture, Research, Engagement, Post-Carbon") is a multidisciplinary consultancy that is wholly owned by SNCF (Stations and Connections division). It was formed in 1997 by Jean-Marie Duthilleul and Étienne Tricaud, architects and engineers. It has 600 staff from around 15 countries, including town planners, architects, engineers, economists, technicians, designers, and project managers. Raphaël Ménard, its president since 2018, has announced his intention to make AREP the laboratory for ecological design through the EMC2B approach.

== History ==
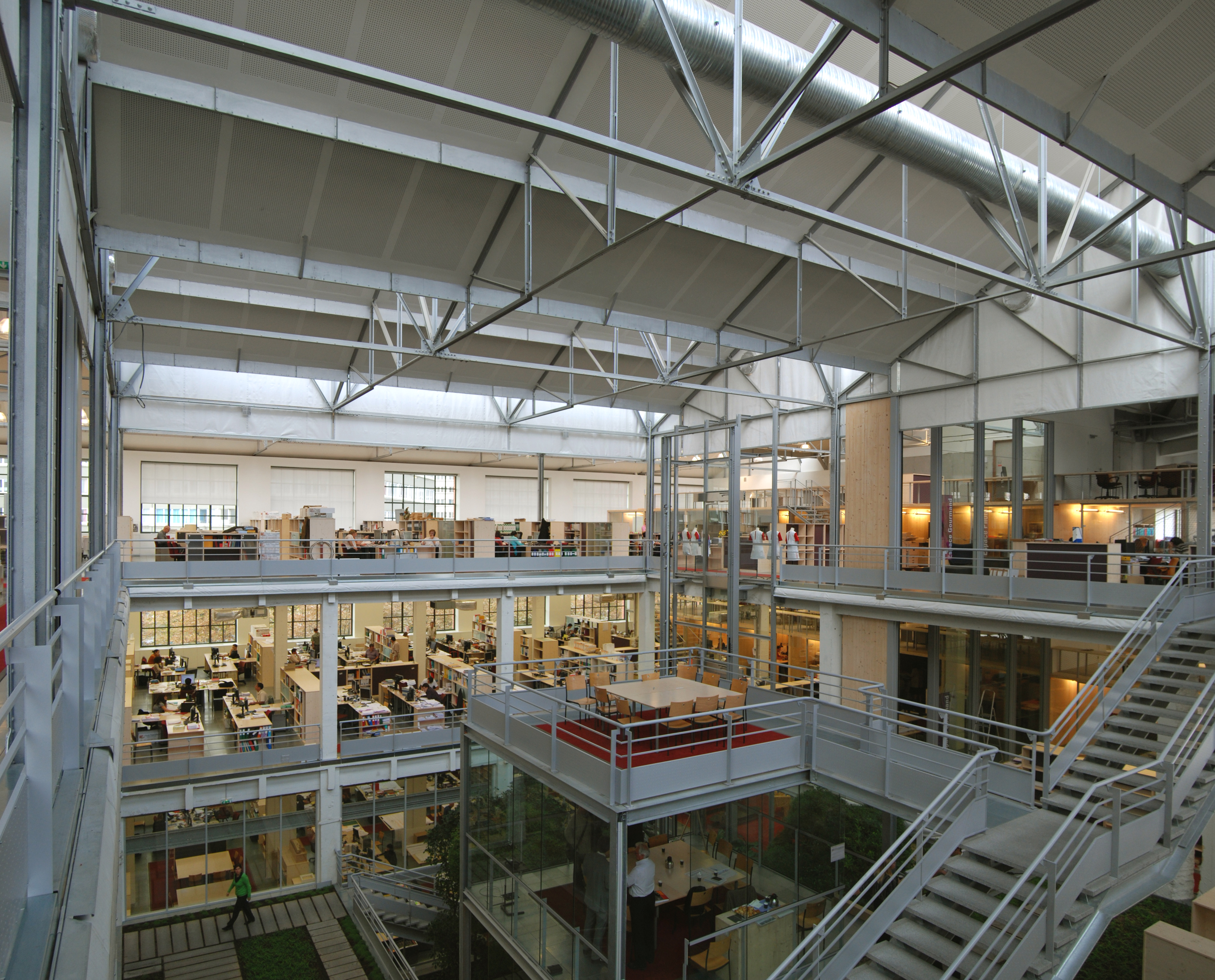
Gares & Connexions, Paris 29 September 2009

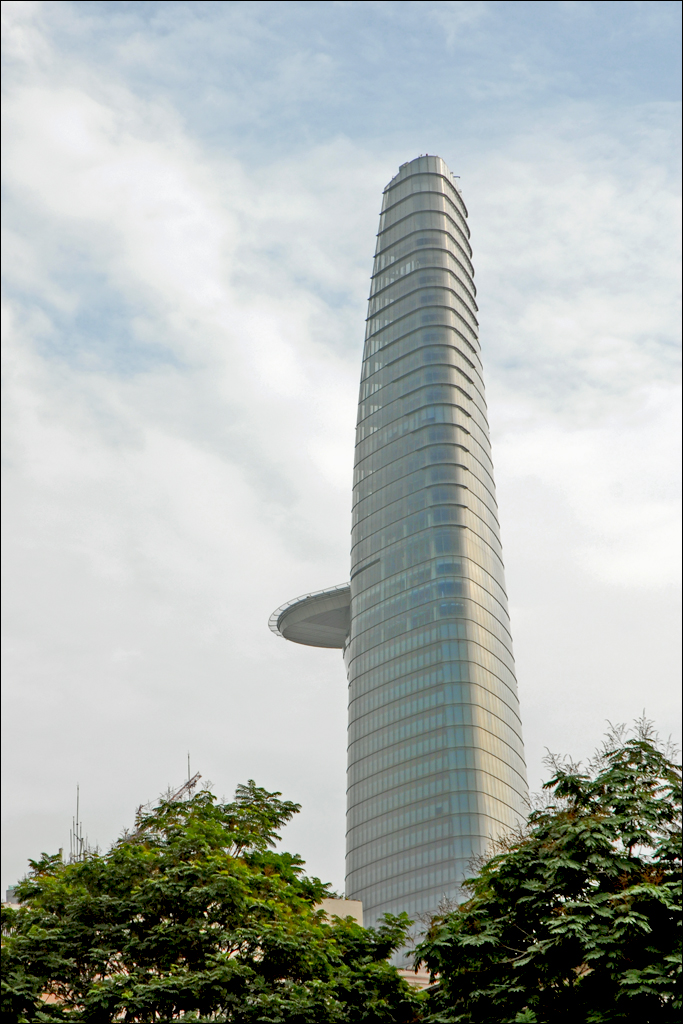
Bitexco Financial Tower in Ho Chi Minh City)

The main area of work for the company is mobility in the urban environment, both in France and worldwide.

== Environmental Vision: The EMC2B Approach ==
AREP has the ambition to become a reference in sustainable architecture. In January 2021, the company set its mission to "invent a post-carbon future" by providing "concrete, frugal, and resilient solutions inspired by the low-tech approach". AREP's environmental strategy is built around the acronym EMC2B: Energy, Material, Carbon, Climate, and Biodiversity. This framework is used to assess the ecological impact of the agency's various projects.

== Organisation ==
AREP is organised into four subsidiaries: AREP (Project management in France), PARVIS (Project support), AREP Ville (Architectural and town planning studies) and MENIGHETTI Programmation (urban and architectural project management, and service plans).

== Projects ==
- Redevelopment of Strasbourg-Ville station
- Redevelopment of Gare du Nord, Paris
- Redevelopment of Angers-Saint-Laud station
- Redevelopment of Bellegarde station
- Redevelopment of Le Mans station
- Design and build of Nîmes-Pont-du-Gard station
- Layout of the Avenue Jean-Jaurès, Paris
- Design and build of the Shanghai South railway station,
- Design and build of the Aspire Tower in Doha, Qatar, opened in 2007
- Design and build of the Bitexco Financial Tower in Ho Chi Minh City, Vietnam, opened in 2010
- Design and build of Wuhan railway station, China
- Design and build of Belfort – Montbéliard TGV station
- Design and build of Besançon Franche-Comté TGV station

=== 2003 ===
- Gare du Nord, Paris, France: Redevelopment of the Eurostar terminal and shopping areas, station management, at
- Perpignan, Pyrénées Orientales, France: project support and development and management of the station district
- Avignon Courtine: architectural plan for the Avignon PLU, in association with the architects Alain Philip et Safia Amarouche, and Michel Desvigne et Ingénieurs and landscapers Jean-Claude Hardy
- Vaucluse: development plan
- Rovaltain: Zone d'aménagement concerté (ZAC) Phase II, in association with landscapers Michel Florain
- Drôme: Prime contractor
- Bondy-Aulnay tram-train: rural and urban feasibility study for 11 crossroads, the Viaduc du Gargan, design of a new OHE system, with Béatrice Fauny landscapers
- Seine-Saint-Denis, France: development plan
- Port of Yong Ding Men, China: development plan. Lauréat dans le cadre du concours de requalification et d’aménagement de l’axe historique Nord-Sud.

=== 2001 ===
- Aix-en-Provence: new TGV station and site development, with Michel Desvigne et Christine Dalnoky landscapers.
- Gare d'Angers-Saint-Laud: redevelopment, development plan, station management.
- Gare d'Antibes: station management
- Avignon: new TGV station and site development, with Michel Desvigne et Christine Dalnoky landscapers
- Gare de Lyon-Part-Dieu: Redevelopment, station management
- Gare de Marseille-Saint-Charles: Security and surveillance post
- Gare de Nogent - Le Perreux: redevelopment

=== 2000 ===
- Gare de Limoges-Bénédictins: redevelopment of the station and the left dome after a fire. Station management.
- Gare de Lourdes: redevelopment, station management
- Gare du Futuroscope, Poitiers: new station, in association with Denis Laming architects

=== 1999 ===
- Haussmann–Saint-Lazare: new station for RER E
- Magenta: new station for RER E
- Bibliothèque François Mitterrand: new interchange with the Météor metro line and RER C
- Monaco-Monte-Carlo: station reconstruction, station management

=== 1998 ===
- Issy–Val de Seine: station renovation and creation of tram interchange, station management
- Gare du Nord: renovation and extensions for the Eurostar terminal, station management
- Stade de France–Saint-Denis: new station for RER D
- La Plaine–Stade de France: new station for RER B

=== 1997 ===
- Creating the Tecno range of seating
- Gare de Nantes: station management,
- Journées Mondiales de la Jeunesse (JMJ) 1997, Podiums at Longchamp and Champs de Mars, station management, Paris, France
- Gare de Versailles – Chantiers, Yvelines: project management

=== Before 1997 ===
- Gare de Lille-Europe: new TGV station and station management, development of the station district
- Gare de Paris-Montparnasse: station renovation and management
- Gare de Paris-Nord: station reconstruction, station management
- Gare de Marne-la-Vallée - Chessy, Seine et Marne: new station serving Disneyland Paris
- Gare Aéroport Charles-de-Gaulle 2 TGV, Ile-de-France: new station
