= Offenburg station =

Railway station in Offenburg, Germany

Offenburg
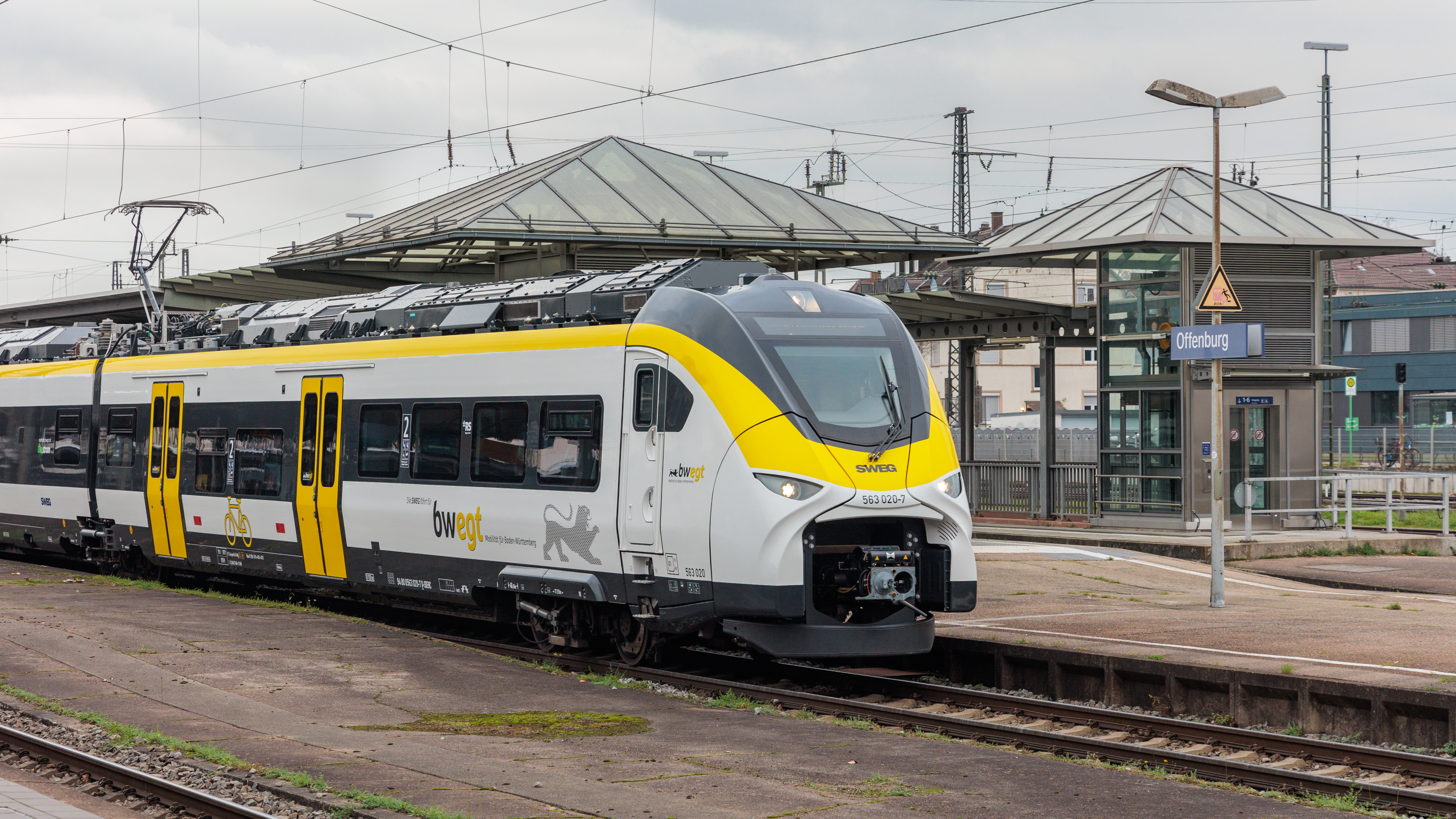
- 2024

General information
- Location: Hauptstraße 1; 77652 Offenburg; Baden-Württemberg; Germany
- Coordinates: 48°28′34″N 7°56′45″E
- Elevation: 159 m (522 ft)
- Owner: Deutsche Bahn
- Operator: DB Netz; DB Station&Service
- Lines: Appenweier–Strasbourg railway (KBS 719); Rhine Valley Railway (KBS 702); Black Forest Railway (KBS 720)
- Platforms: 7

Construction
- Accessible: Yes

Other information
- Station code: 4745
- DS100 code: RO
- IBNR: 8000290
- Category: 2
- Fare zone: TGO: 5
- Website: www.bahnhof.de

History
- Opened: 1844; 182 years ago

Services
Preceding station	DB Fernverkehr	Following station
Baden-Baden towards Berlin Ostbahnhof	ICE 12	Freiburg Hbf towards Brig, Chur or Interlaken Ost
Baden-Baden towards Hamburg Hbf	ICE/ECE 20	Freiburg Hbf towards Basel SBB
Baden-Baden towards Hamburg-Altona or Amsterdam Centraal	ICE 43	Freiburg Hbf towards Basel SBB, Chur or Brig
Baden-Baden towards München Hbf	ICE 60	Freiburg Hbf towards Basel Baden
Preceding station	SNCF	Following station
Strasbourg-Ville towards Paris-Est	TGV inOui	Lahr (Schwarzw) towards Freiburg Hbf
Preceding station	ÖBB	Following station
Bonn Hbf towards Amsterdam Centraal	Nightjet	Freiburg Hbf towards Zürich HB
Karlsruhe Hbf towards Hamburg-Altona	Nightjet	Freiburg Hbf towards Zürich HB
Baden-Baden towards Berlin Hbf	Nightjet	Freiburg Hbf towards Zürich HB
Preceding station	DB Regio Baden-Württemberg	Following station
Appenweier towards Karlsruhe Hbf	RE 2	Gengenbach towards Konstanz
Appenweier towards Karlsruhe Hbf	RE 7	Lahr (Schwarzw) towards Basel Bad Bf
Terminus	RB 26	Friesenheim (Baden) towards Freiburg Hbf
Preceding station	(Offenburg)	Following station
Terminus	RS 1	Offenburg Kreisschulzentrum towards Freudenstadt Hbf
Appenweier towards Bad Griesbach	RS 2	Terminus
Appenweier towards Ottenhöfen	RS 3	Terminus
Appenweier towards Strasbourg-Ville	RS 4	Terminus
Terminus	RS 12	Offenburg Kreisschulzentrum towards Oberharmersbach-Riersbach
Location

Offenburg station (German: Bahnhof Offenburg) is a railway station in Baden-Württemberg and has seven tracks on four platforms. Offenburg used to be a railway town and the station was of major economic importance to it. In recent years the maintenance facilities and much of the rail freight yards have been closed. The station is very centrally located within the city and is easily accessible by 18 different bus routes from the central bus station, 50 metres from the railway station.

== Rail services ==
The station was served by the following services in 2026:

=== Long-distance passenger services ===
Train class	Route			Frequency
ICE 12	Berlin Ostbahnhof – Berlin – Braunschweig – Kassel-Wilhelmshöhe – Frankfurt – Mannheim – Karlsruhe – Offenburg – Freiburg – Basel –	Liestal – Olten – Bern – Thun – Spiez –	Interlaken West – Interlaken East	Every two hours
ICE 12	Berlin Ostbahnhof – Berlin – Braunschweig – Kassel-Wilhelmshöhe – Frankfurt – Mannheim – Karlsruhe – Offenburg – Freiburg – Basel –	Liestal – Olten – Bern – Thun – Spiez –	Visp – Brig	Every two hours
ICE 12	Berlin Ostbahnhof – Berlin – Braunschweig – Kassel-Wilhelmshöhe – Frankfurt – Mannheim – Karlsruhe – Offenburg – Freiburg – Basel –	Zürich – Sargans – Landquart – Chur		Every two hours
ICE/ECE 20	Hamburg – Hanover – Göttingen – Kassel – Frankfurt am Main – Mannheim – Karlsruhe – Baden-Baden – Offenburg – Freiburg – Basel			Every two hours
ICE 43	Hamburg-Altona – Hamburg – Bremen – Osnabrück – Münster – Dortmund – Essen – Düsseldorf –		Cologne – Frankfurt Airport – Mannheim – Karlsruhe – Offenburg – Freiburg – Basel Bad Bf – Basel SBB	Every two hours
ICE 43	Hannover – Bielefeld – Hamm – Dortmund – Wuppertal –		Cologne – Frankfurt Airport – Mannheim – Karlsruhe – Offenburg – Freiburg – Basel Bad Bf – Basel SBB	Every two hours
ICE 43	Amsterdam – Oberhausen – Duisburg – Düsseldorf –		Cologne – Frankfurt Airport – Mannheim – Karlsruhe – Offenburg – Freiburg – Basel Bad Bf – Basel SBB	Every two hours
ICE 60; Baden-Kurier	Basel SBB – Basel Bad Bf – Freiburg – Offenburg – Karlsruhe – Bruchsal – Stuttgart – Ulm – Augsburg – Munich			One train pair
TGV inOui	Paris-Est – Strasbourg-Ville – Offenburg – Lahr (Schwarzw) – Ringsheim/Europa-Park – Freiburg			One train pair

InterCityExpress services operate through the station every two hours between Berlin, Frankfurt and Basel and between Cologne, Frankfurt Airport and Basel.

== Regional services ==
Train class	Route	Frequency	Operator
RE 2	Karlsruhe – Baden-Baden – Achern – Offenburg – Haslach – Hausach – Villingen – Singen – Radolfzell – Konstanz	60 min	DB Regio
RE 7	(Karlsruhe –) Offenburg – Lahr – Emmendingen – Freiburg – Bad Krozingen – Müllheim – Weil am Rhein – Basel Bad Bf (– Basel SBB)	60 min (staggered intervals)	DB Regio
RS 1	Offenburg – Biberach – Hausach – Hornberg / (– Alpirsbach – Freudenstadt)	60 min	SWEG
RS 2	Offenburg – Appenweier – Oberkirch – Bad Griesbach	60 Min	SWEG
RS 12	(Offenburg –) Biberach – Zell am Harmersbach – Oberharmersbach-Riersbach	2 pairs of trains on weekdays	SWEG
RS 3	(Offenburg – Appenweier –) Achern – Ottenhöfen	2 pairs of trains on weekdays	SWEG
RS 4	Offenburg – Appenweier – Kork – Kehl – Strasbourg	30/60 min	SWEG
RB 26	Freiburg – Emmendingen – Riegel-Malterdingen – Lahr – Offenburg	30/60 min	SWEG

(as of 15 December 2024)

Regional rail services are operated as the Ortenau-S-Bahn, by Südwestdeutsche Verkehrs-Aktiengesellschaft, a company owned by Baden-Württemberg.

== History ==
The station was designed by the architect, Friedrich Eisenlohr (1805–1855), as a smaller version of the old railway station in Karlsruhe, opened in 1843 and closed in 1913. During World War I several attacks were carried out on the station. The most serious of these took place on 22 July 1918 with four direct hits leading to the collapse of the entire central part of the station entrance building. During the Occupation of the Ruhr in February 1923, Offenburg and Appenweier were also occupied, disrupting the Rhine Valley Railway. Therefore, until 12 December 1923 trains on the Baden Mainline had to be diverted on the route through the Black Forest towns of Donaueschingen, Hausach, Freudenstadt, Hochdorf towards Pforzheim.

== See also ==
- Rail transport in Germany
