= Jean-Marie Duthilleul =

French architect and civil engineer

- Born: 1952 (age 73–74)
- Education: École de Paris La Seine, Paris (architect) École Polytechnique, Palaiseau (engineer) École des Ponts et Chaussées, Paris (engineer)
- Occupation: Architect
- Practice: AREP

Jean-Marie Duthilleul (French pronunciation: [ʒɑ̃ maʁi dytijœl]; born 1952) is a French architect and civil engineer.

== Education ==
He studied architecture at the École de Paris La Seine, Paris and engineering at the École Polytechnique and the École des Ponts et Chaussées (now École des Ponts ParisTech).

== Career ==
In 1977, he became interested in the subject of urban planning, particularly of planned communities, which helped shape his views on centralisation, social mobility, population density and, later, energy management.

In 1982, he was project manager for the Universal Exposition and in 1983 was put in charge of the management of large Parisian civil state-sponsored projects. In 1986, the directors of SNCF (French State Railways) hired him to form a new architectural division. With Étienne Tricaud, he laid the theoretical groundwork for the creation of new, large stations in a contemporary style, which he saw from the points of view of both urban planning and architecture: opening up the city, intermodal transport, traffic management, accessibility and commercial development.

In 1997, he won the competition for the new high speed train station in Seoul, Korea. He and Tricaud created the multidisciplinary AREP agency (French: Amenagement, Recherche, Pole d'Echanges, "Management, Research, Interchange") as a wholly owned subsidiary of SNCF. AREP has since been involved in the development of many stations and other urban developments both in France and elsewhere.

Duthilleul was a consultant on the Grand Paris project, working with Jean Nouvel and Michel Cantal-Dupart. From 2010 to 2012 he presided over the planning committee for Plan Campus set up by the French Ministry of Higher Education and Research.

In 2012, he created his own practice, Agence Duthilleul.

== Projects ==
Gare d'Orléans concourse

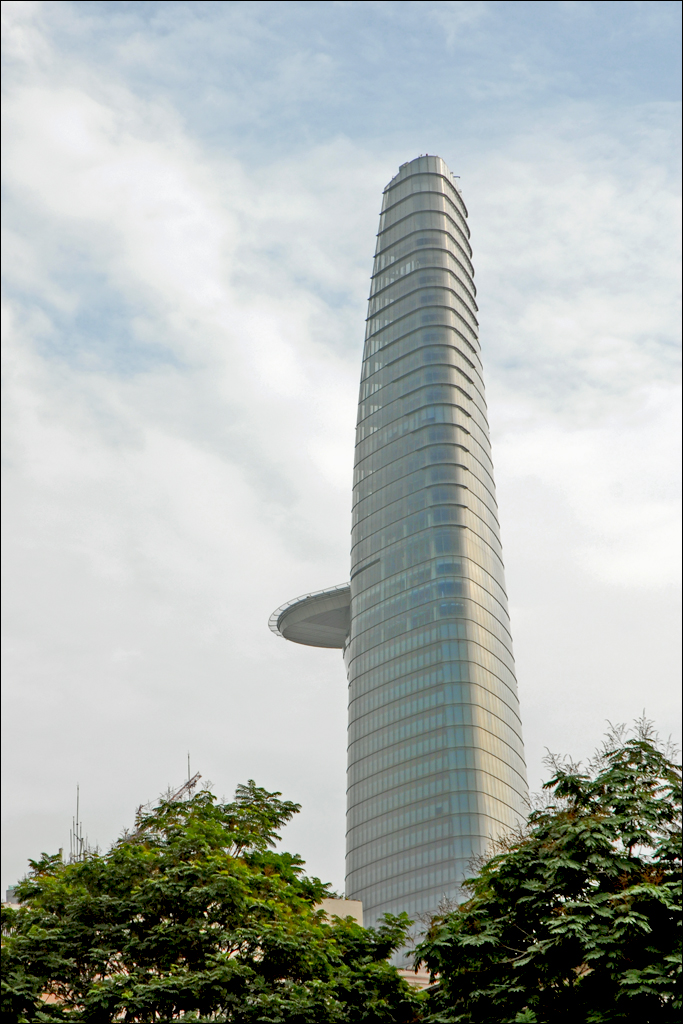
Bitexco Financial Tower

- Gare de Paris-Montparnasse
- Gare de Nantes
- Management of the Gare de Paris-Nord, Paris
- New Gare de Lille-Europe
- New Gare Aéroport Charles-de-Gaulle 2 TGV
- Gare de La Plaine-Stade de France RER station (Seine-Saint-Denis)
- New Gare de Marne-la-Vallée - Chessy (Disneyland Paris)
- Stations on the LGV Méditerranée (2001):
  - Gare d'Avignon TGV
  - Gare de Valence TGV
  - Gare d'Aix-en-Provence TGV
- Saint-François de Molitor Church, Paris (2005)
- Capital Museum, Beijing (2005)
- Gares de la LGV Est européenne (2007):
  - Gare de Champagne-Ardenne TGV, Bezannes
  - Gare de Lorraine TGV, Louvigny
  - Gare de Meuse TGV, Les Trois-Domaines
- Halle Honorat and management of the Gare de Marseille-Saint-Charles (2006)
- Gare de Strasbourg (redevelopment with canopy construction) (2007)
- Gare d'Orléans, Paris (2007)
- Bitexco Financial Tower, Ho Chi Minh City (2010)
- Wuhan Railway Station (2010)
- Gare de Belfort - Montbéliard TGV (2011)
- Gare de Besançon Franche-Comté TGV (2011)
- Planned for the Grand Paris Express:
  - Stations at Pont de Sèvres (Paris RER) and Noisy - Champs (Paris RER) (2020)
  - Stations at Sevran - Livry (Paris RER) and Sevran - Beaudottes (Paris RER) (2023)

Duthilleul also designed stations in Seoul, Korea and Shanghai, China. He has also worked on projects at several cathedrals including the Notre Dame de Paris and Notre Dame de Strasbourg.
