= Lahr (Schwarzw) station =

Railway station in Lahr/Schwarzwald, Germany

Lahr (Schwarzw)
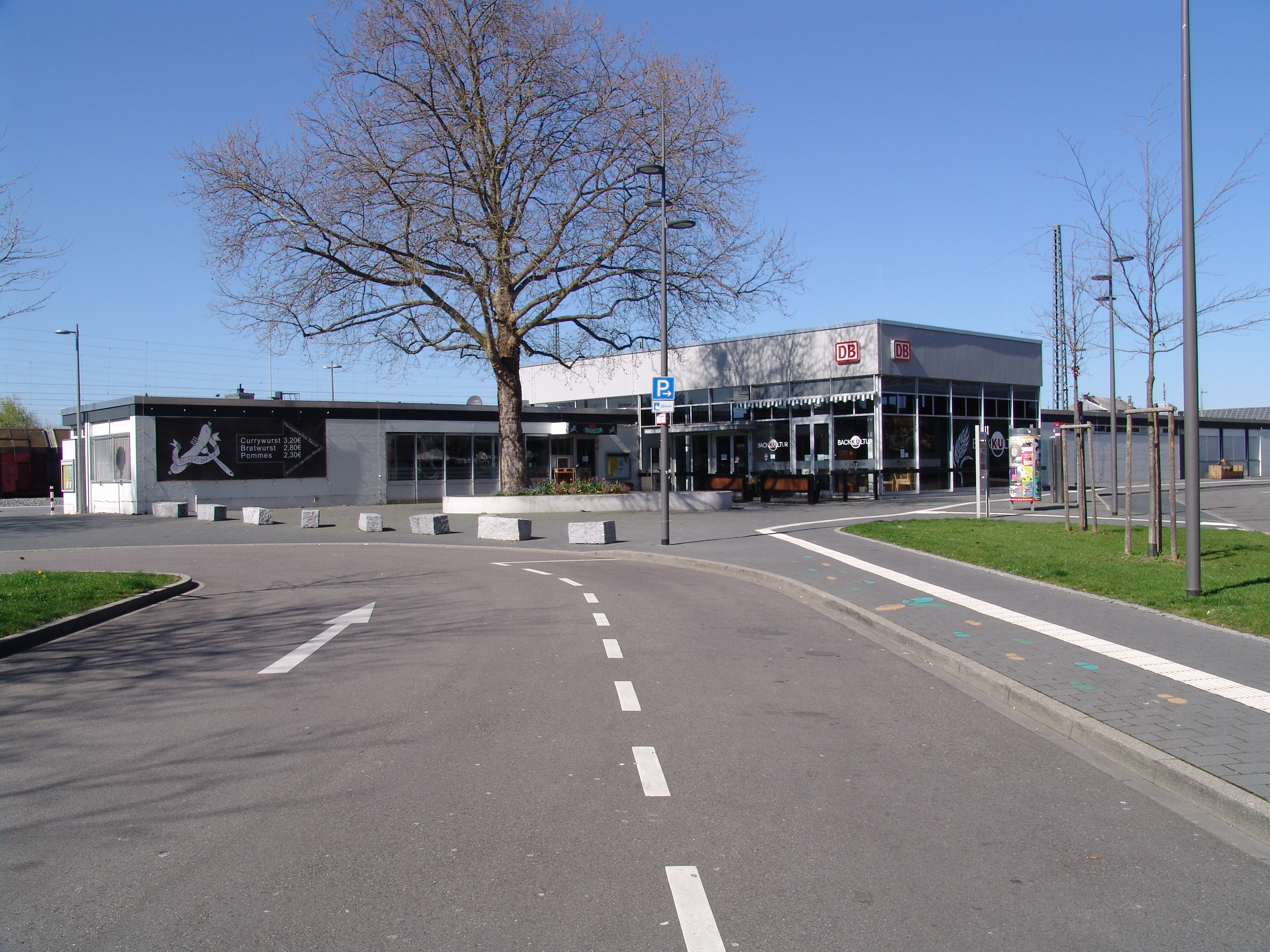

General information
- Location: Bahnhofplatz 1, 77933 Lahr, Baden-Württemberg; Germany
- Coordinates: 48°20′25″N 7°50′06″E
- Owner: DB Netz
- Operator: DB Station&Service
- Lines: Rhine Valley Railway (km 163.7); Lahr–Lahr Stadt (km 0.0; dismantled)
- Tracks: 4

Construction
- Accessible: Yes

Other information
- Station code: 3494
- DS100 code: RLSW
- IBNR: 8003494
- Category: 4
- Fare zone: TGO: 6
- Website: www.bahnhof.de

History
- Opened: 1 August 1845; 181 years ago
- Former names: Dinglingen; Lahr-Dinglingen

Services
Preceding station	SNCF	Following station
Offenburg towards Paris-Est	TGV inOui	Ringsheim/Europa-Park towards Freiburg Hbf
Offenburg towards Bordeaux	TGV inOui	Ringsheim/Europa-Park towards Freiburg Hbf
Preceding station	DB Fernverkehr	Following station
Offenburg towards München Hbf	ICE 60	Freiburg Hbf towards Basel Bad Bf
Preceding station	DB Regio Baden-Württemberg	Following station
Offenburg towards Karlsruhe Hbf	RE 7	Orschweier towards Basel Bad Bf
Friesenheim (Baden) towards Offenburg	RB 26	Orschweier towards Freiburg Hbf
Location

Lahr (Schwarzw) station is the station of the town of Lahr (also known as Lahr/Schwarzwald, meaning Lahr in the Black Forest) on the Rhine Valley Railway in the German state of Baden-Württemberg. It was opened on 1 August 1845 with the section of Rhine Valley Railway between Offenburg and Freiburg and lies a few kilometres west of the town's centre.

== Name ==
The station is on the boundaries of Dinglingen, which was a separate municipality until 1933. Until the incorporation of Dinglingen into Lahr, the station was called Dinglingen. After its incorporation, Deutsche Reichsbahn called the station Lahr-Dinglingen. After the former Lahr Stadt (Lahr town) station lost its passenger services in 1959, Deutsche Bundesbahn gave the station its present name in 1962.

== History ==
From 1865, there was a short branch line to Lahr Stadt. In 1959, Deutsche Bundesbahn ended passenger services on the line and in 1995 it also ended freight services.

From 1894 to 1959, there was also a transfer track to the metre gauge railway of the Central Baden Railways (Mittelbadischen Eisenbahnen), which had a level crossing over the Rhine Valley Railway until 1910, when the crossing was replaced by a bridge. There was a station on the metre-gauge line to the east of the bridge, about 250 m from the standard gauge station, which allowed the interchange of passengers.

== Rail services ==
The station is served by Regionalbahn and Regional-Express services and has had an Intercity service daily each way between Basel and Munich since 16 December 2013 and a TGV service daily each way between Freiburg and Paris since 9 December 2018.

Rail services in the 2024 timetable
Service	Route	Frequency
TGV inOui	Freiburg (Breisgau) – Emmendingen – Lahr – Offenburg – Strasbourg – Paris Est	One train pair
TGV inOui	Bordeaux St-Jean – Angoulême – Poitiers – St-Pierre-des-Corps – Massy TGV – Marne La Vallée-Chessy – Champagne-Ardenne TGV – Meuse TGV – Lorraine TGV – Strasbourg-Ville – Offenburg – Lahr – Lahr - Freiburg Hbf	One train pair weekend
ICE 60	Munich – Stuttgart – Karlsruhe – Offenburg – Lahr – Freiburg (Breisgau) – Basel Bad Bf	One train pair
RE 7	Offenburg – Lahr – Emmendingen – Freiburg – Müllheim (Baden) – Weil am Rhein – Basel Bad Bf (– Basel SBB)	Hourly
RB 26	(Müllheim (Baden) –) (some trains on weekdays) Freiburg – Denzlingen – Riegel-Malterdingen – Lahr – Offenburg	Hourly
