= Appenweier station =

Railway station in Appenweier, Germany

Appenweier
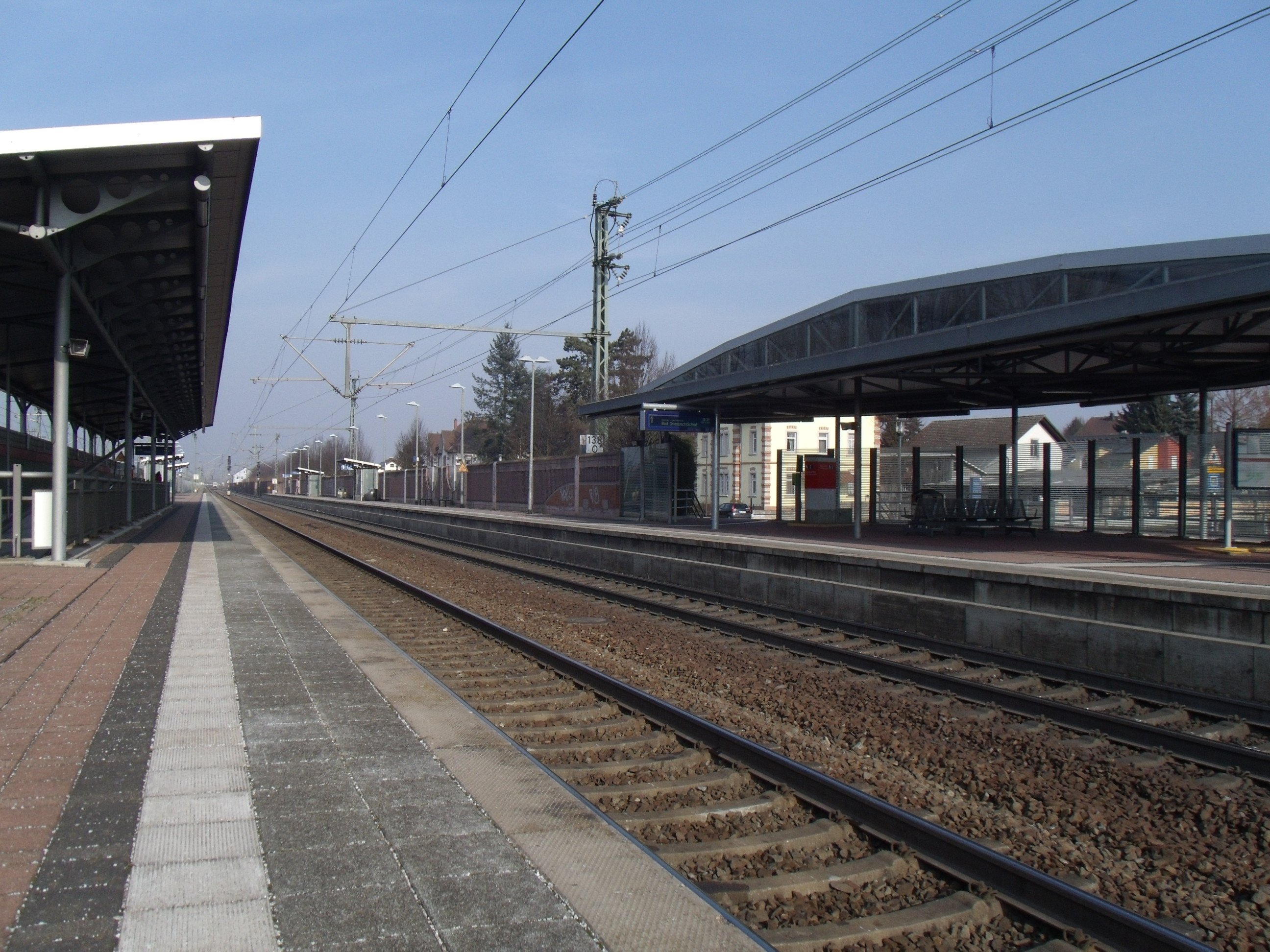
- 2012

General information
- Location: Bahnhofstraße; 77767 Appenweier, Baden-Württemberg; Germany
- Coordinates: 48.5414°N 7.9735°E
- Elevation: 147 m (482 ft)
- Owner: Deutsche Bahn
- Operator: DB Netz; DB Station&Service
- Lines: Rhine Valley Railway (KBS 702); Appenweier–Strasbourg railway (KBS 719); Rench Valley Railway (KBS 718)
- Platforms: 3 side platforms
- Tracks: 6
- Train operators: DB Regio; Ortenau S-Bahn

Other information
- Station code: 168
- DS100 code: RAP
- IBNR: 8000596
- Category: 4
- Fare zone: TGO: 4
- Website: www.bahnhof.de

Services
Preceding station	DB Regio Baden-Württemberg	Following station
Renchen towards Karlsruhe Hbf	RE 2	Offenburg towards Konstanz
Renchen towards Karlsruhe Hbf	RE 7	Offenburg towards Basel Bad Bf
Preceding station	(Offenburg)	Following station
Zusenhofen towards Bad Griesbach	RS 2	Offenburg Terminus
Renchen towards Ottenhöfen	RS 3	Offenburg Terminus
Legelshurst towards Strasbourg-Ville	RS 4	Offenburg Terminus
Location

Appenweier station is a railway station in the municipality of Appenweier, located in the Ortenaukreis district in Baden-Württemberg, Germany.

It sits at the eastern end of the Appenweier–Strasbourg railway, whose western end, at Strasbourg, is in France.
