= Étienne Tricaud =

French architect and civil engineer

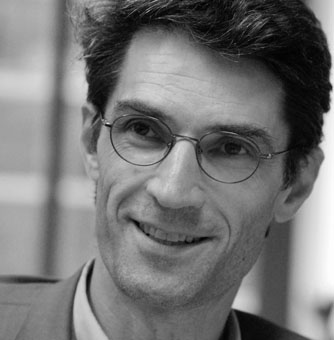
- Born: 1960 (age 65–66)
- Education: Ecole de Paris Tolbiac (architecture); Ecole National des Ponts et Chaussées (engineering)
- Occupation: Architect
- Practice: AREP
- Website: arep.fr

Étienne Tricaud (born 1960) is an architect and civil engineer.

== Biography ==
Tricaud got his interest in architecture from his uncle Pierre Prunet, who was Chief Architect for the Department of Historic Monuments. Prunet carried out restoration works on structures with important heritage, but his agency also designed many new projects. But his greatest satisfaction was to work on projects that combined the two.

Tricaud's visits to Prunet's agency led to a strong interest in the art of building and an appreciation of a rigorous and restrained approach that he would subsequently refine while studying architecture under Roland Schweitzer. From this experience and his (dual) architectural training, Tricaud acquired the conviction that an informed project approach could only be based on a subtle marriage between architecture and engineering, both of which providing different yet complementary sources of creation in their relationship to reality. The result is an architecture aware of the uses to be made of the building and the identity of the setting, and an engineering based on the understanding and use of the laws of physics.

In 1986, he met Jean-Marie Duthilleul who had recently joined the SNCF (French National Railways) to develop an architectural design policy for stations. They immediately realised that they shared the same approach to projects: a rational and contextual methodology with particular attention paid to the use and identity of the setting.

The project for restructuring the Montparnasse station for which he was responsible served as an incubator, allowing them to form a team, an approach and an architectural vocabulary that they subsequently developed for the station programmes accompanying the TGV Atlantique, TGV Méditerranée and TGV Est.

== AREP ==
In 1997, Tricaud and Duthilleul founded AREP (French: Amenagement, Recherche, Pole d'Echanges, "Planning, Research, Interchange") in 1997, a company that brought together teams of architects and engineers. The experience acquired with AREP in the study of exchange hubs – centres combining means of transport, movement and crowds of people – proved to be adaptable to a number of different fields: public buildings, city spaces and complex urban programmes.

Since AREP's foundation, the large number of projects carried out in other countries has allowed Tricaud to adapt his design approach to new contexts, especially through partnerships with other designers: Hadi Simaan in Doha, Carlos Zapata in Ho Chi Minh City, Cui Kai in Beijing, and Yves Feng in Shenzhen, among others.

== Selected works ==
- Casa-Port railway station, Morocco
- Gare d'Aix-en-Provence TGV, France
- Capital Museum, Beijing, China
- Gare Saint-Lazare, France

=== Publications ===
- Jean-Marie Duthilleul et Etienne Tricaud, AREP. Master Architect Series (in French and English). Images Publishing. 1 October 2007. ISBN 978-1-86470-164-7.
