= Saint-François de Molitor =

Coordinates: 48.8454°N 2.2600°E

Church of Saint-François de Molitor
- Église Saint-François de Molitor
- Location: 16th arrondissement of Paris
- Country: France
- Denomination: Roman Catholic

History
- Status: Parish church
- Consecrated: 18 March 2005

Architecture
- Functional status: Active
- Architect(s): Corinne Callies; Jean-Marie Duthilleul
- Style: Contemporary

Administration
- Archdiocese: Archdiocese of Paris

Saint-François de Molitor (French pronunciation: [sɛ̃.fʁɑ̃.swa d(ə) mɔ.li.tɔʁ]) is a Roman Catholic parish church in the Auteuil-Molitor quarter of the 16th arrondissement of Paris. It replaced a Capuchin chapel built in 1941.

In 1996 its parish was carved out of the existing parishes of Notre-Dame-d'Auteuil and Sainte Jeanne-de-Chantal.

The church serves Sunday congregations of around 1,500 people, and aims to cater for a smaller parish than its predecessor. Among its principal activities is its chaplaincy to the Oiseaux Girls' School.

The architects of this radically new and innovative structure were Corinne Cailles and Jean-Marie Duthilleul.

== Location ==
The church is situated on the Rue Molitor, close to the Roland Garros tennis stadium and the Parc des Princes football stadium. The street is named for General Gabriel Jean Joseph Molitor.

It is served by the Michel-Ange – Molitor metro station.

== History ==
The church is dedicated to Saint Francis of Assisi. It was consecrated on 18 March 2005 by Monsignor André Vingt-Trois, the Archbishop of Paris. His predecessor, Cardinal Jean-Marie Lustiger had brought the project to fruition in accord with the Vatican II guidelines (1962 – 1965) for new places of worship, as he did for other Parisian churches built during his tenure.

== Architecture ==
The church's bell tower acts as a landmark for itself and the parish. It is slightly higher than the façade and on the same alignment, which is a difference from other new churches in Paris such as Notre-Dame-de-l'Arche-d'Alliance in the 15th arrondissement and Notre-Dame de la Sagesse in the 13th.

On its southern side, the church fronts directly onto the street. It is entirely clad in semi-translucent white marble. This striking material demarks the religious character of the building and sets it apart from its neighbors. At night, because of the marble's translucence, the church's interior lighting illuminates the street outside.

At the base of the bell tower there is a monumental sculpture of a young, dynamic St Francis of Assisi by Alain Courtaigne. Francis walks towards God, among reliefs evoking his life and spiritual quest. The piece was sculpted from a single block of white granite mined in Galicia, Spain. Its siting makes it appear to rise out of the ground at the entrance of the passageway between the church and its neighbor.

The organ of St François de Molitor is a second-hand instrument of the builder Detlef Kleuker. It comes from the chapel of a hospital in Heidelberg, Germany. Dismantled and restored by Christophe Cailleux, many modifications were necessary to adapt it to the church of St François de Molitor (interior layout, wind circuit, replacement of mechanical traction by electric traction, the addition of stops, the rearrangement on the windchests).The console located on the tribune to the left of the organ, is an old Allen console, adapted by Christophe Cailleux who equipped it with an electronic combinator with 4096 combinations. Voicing was done by Michel Gaillard.

A visitor entering through one of the three monumental doorways (of rare amazoué wood) will cross a narthex to get to the aisles and the nave. Its south-north orientation and elliptical form, by architects Corinne Callies and Jean-Marie Duthilleul, has 420 seating places; it is reminiscent of a barque, the symbol of evangelism. The floor slopes gently towards the altar. The baptismal font, altar, ambon and holy cross are all aligned along the major axis of the ellipse. The golden cross stands in front of a glass wall which separates it from the chancel.

The church is thus constructed around its purpose of liturgical prayer: the altar, in the centre of the ellipse and thus of the whole building, is surrounded by two spaces for priests and laity, which come together like two hands in a prayer of collect. In the small chapel to the right of the entrance, there is a 14th-century cross and tabernacle.

== Gallery ==
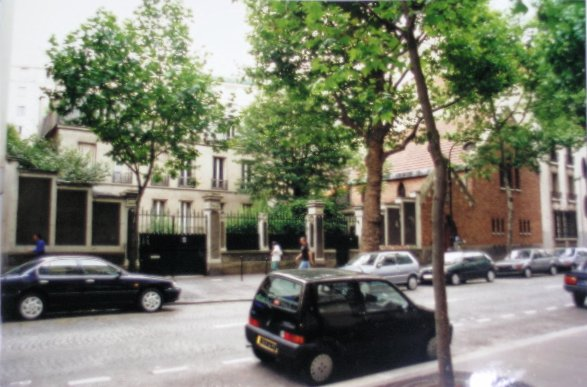
Previous chapel
