= Les Trois-Domaines =

- Commune
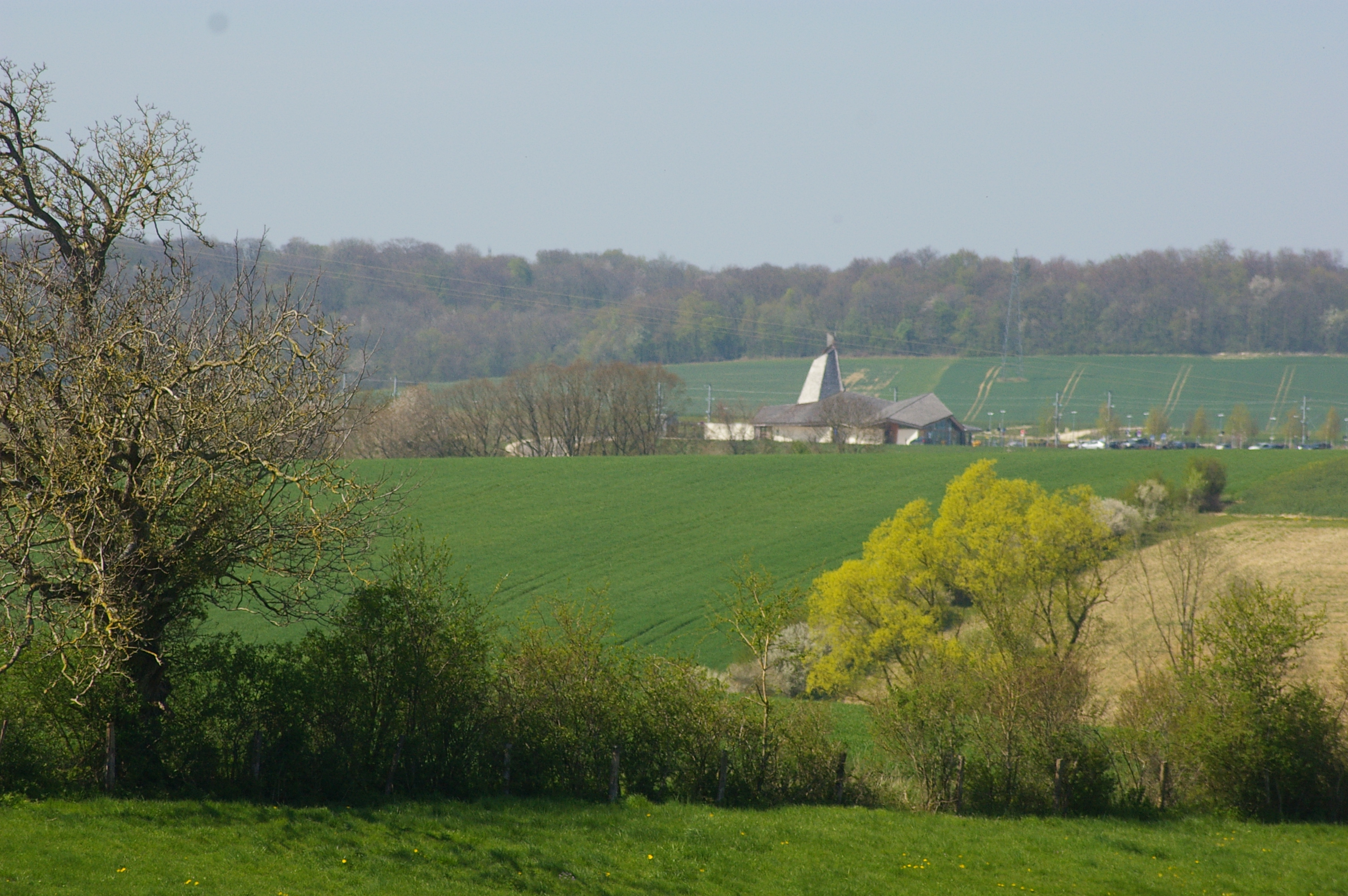
- The Meuse TGV station in Les Trois-Domaines

- Coat of arms
- Location of Les Trois-Domaines
- Location within France Location within Grand Est
- Coordinates: 48°58′03″N 5°17′15″E
- Country: France
- Region: Grand Est
- Department: Meuse
- Arrondissement: Bar-le-Duc
- Canton: Dieue-sur-Meuse
- Intercommunality: CC de l'Aire à l'Argonne

Government
  - Mayor (2020–2026): Christian Bazart
- Area^{1}: 16.49 km^{2} (6.37 sq mi)
- Elevation: 265 m (869 ft)
- Highest elevation: 343 m (1,125 ft)
- Lowest elevation: 237 m (778 ft)
- Population (2023): 119
  - Density: 7.22/km^{2} (18.7/sq mi)
- Time zone: UTC+01:00 (CET)
  - Summer (DST): UTC+02:00 (CEST)
- INSEE/Postal code: 55254 /55220
- ^{1} French Land Register data, which excludes lakes, ponds, glaciers > 1 km^{2} (0.386 sq mi or 247 acres) and river estuaries.

Les Trois-Domaines (French pronunciation: [le tʁwɑ dɔmɛn]) is a commune in the Meuse department in Grand Est in north-eastern France.

The commune of Les Trois-Domaines ("the three estates") was formed by the merger of the former communes of Issoncourt, Mondrecourt, and Rignaucourt in 1973. The Meuse TGV station is situated in the commune.

== See also ==
- Communes of the Meuse department
