= Pierre Cardin (brand) =

French luxury brand

- Product type: Fashion, perfume, jewellery, watches, pens
- Current owner: Cardin family (99.9%; disputed); Rodrigo Basilicati-Cardin (0.1%)
- Country: France
- Introduced: 1950; 76 years ago
- Markets: Worldwide
- Website: pierrecardin.com

The Pierre Cardin brand is a French luxury designer brand that was founded in 1950 by namesake designer, Pierre Cardin. Initially a prestigious fashion house, the brand extended successfully into perfumes and cosmetics during the 1960s, added furniture and home decor in 1968, then acquired new products for licensing rapidly during the 1970s.

By the late 1970s, his name could be found on over 2,000 products, ranging from bicycle accessories to wine and cookware to home furnishings to heaters and blow dryers. He would continue to add licensees during the following decade, even showing them all together in 1983 at a four-day event in Beijing. From 1988 onward, the brand was licensed extensively, and it appeared on "wildly nonadjacent products such as baseball caps and cigarettes".

== Overview ==
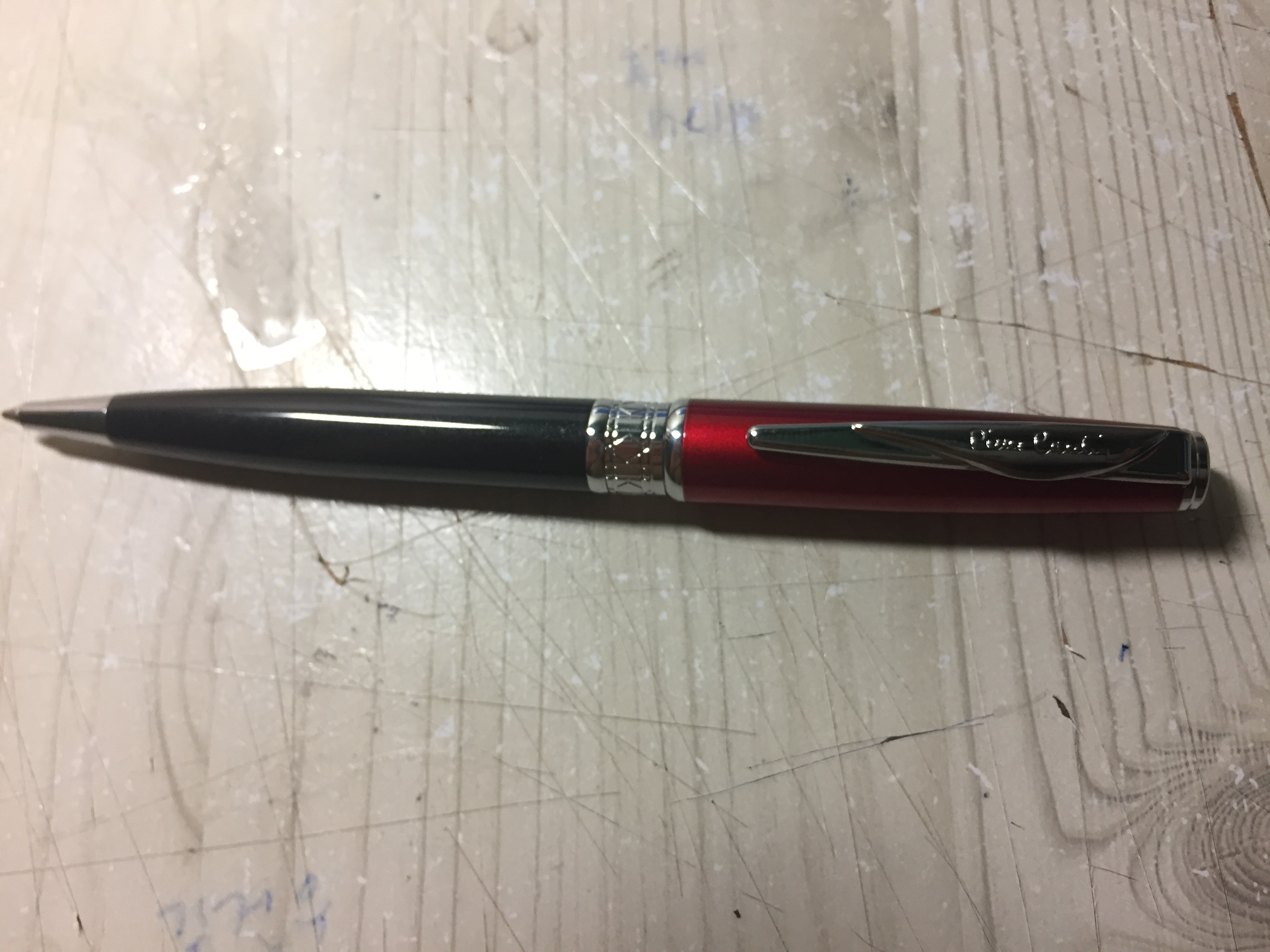
Pierre Cardin-branded pen

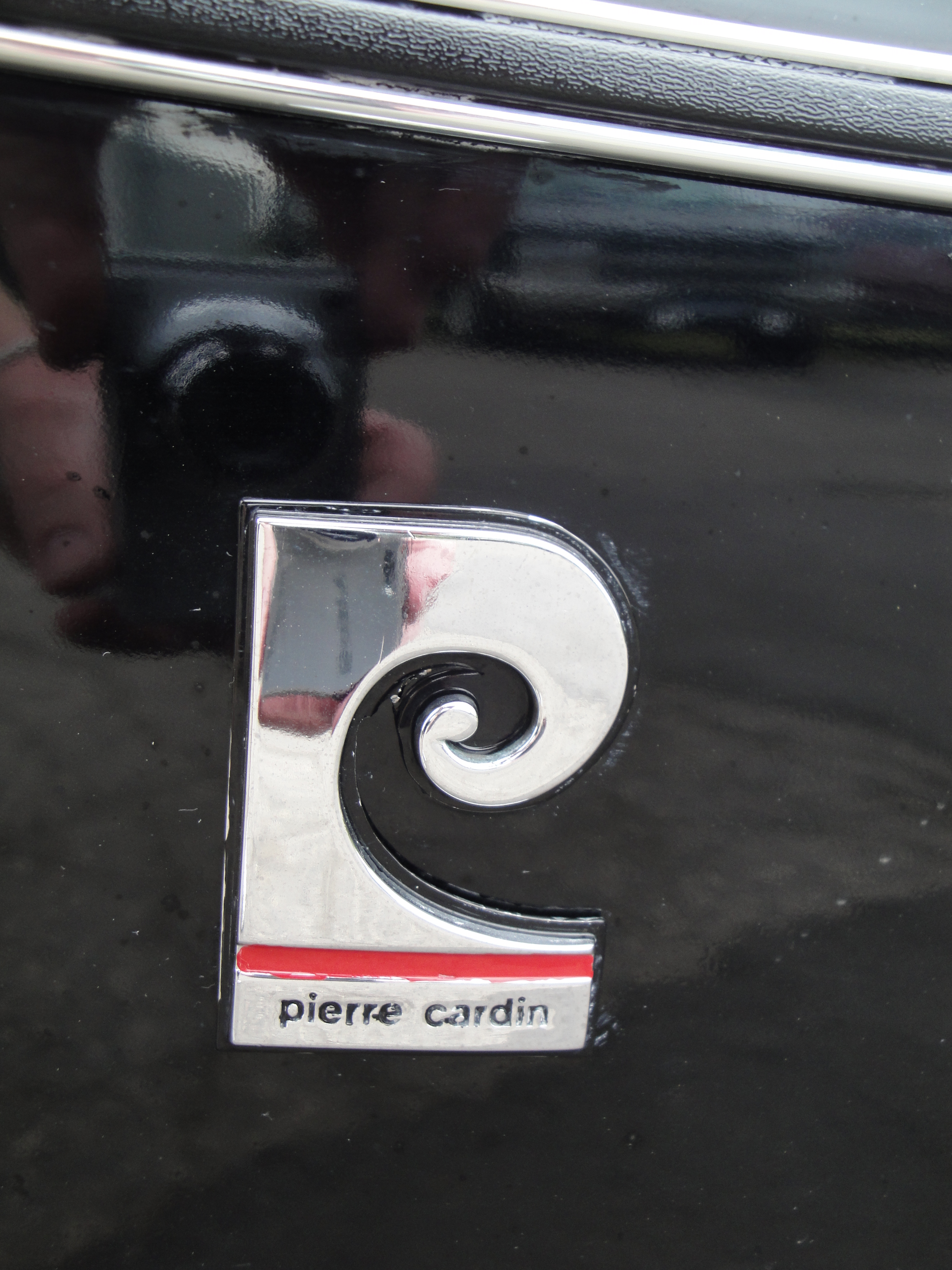
The Pierre Cardin logo on a special version of the AMC Javelin

The brand manages more than 8,000 stores in 170 countries. The number of employees who work on the creation of Pierre Cardin products is more than 20,000 people.

All products of the Pierre Cardin brand are produced at the Ahlers Group factory in Herford, Germany.

A 2005 article in the Harvard Business Review commented that the extension into perfumes and cosmetics was successful because the premium nature of the Pierre Cardin brand transferred well into these new, adjacent categories, but that the owners of the brand mistakenly attributed this to the brand's strength rather than to its fit with the new product categories. The extensive licensing eroded the brand's credibility, but brought in much revenue. In 1986, Women's Wear Daily (WWD) estimated Cardin's annual income at over US$10 million.

In 1995, quotes from WWD included "Pierre Cardin—he has sold his name for toilet paper. At what point do you lose your identity?" and "Cardin's cachet crashed when his name appeared on everything from key chains to pencil holders". However, the Cardin name was still very profitable, although the indiscriminate licensing approach was considered a failure.

In 2011, Cardin tried to sell the business, valuing it at €1 billion, although the Wall Street Journal considered it to be worth about a fifth of that amount. Ultimately, he did not sell the brand.
