= Christine Dalnoky =

French landscape architect and educator

Christine Dalnoky (born 1956) is a French landscape architect and educator.

She was born in Paris and studied at the École nationale supérieure des Beaux-Arts there and at the National School of Landscape Architecture in Versailles. Dalnoky worked with Michel Desvigne and Alexandre Chemetoff in Paris and with Renzo Piano in Geneva. She studied in Rome for two years after winning a competition sponsored by the French Academy in Rome. Dalnoky held a residency at the Villa Medici from 1987 to 1988;

On her return to Paris in 1988, she established the Desvigne & Dalnoky agency with Michel Desvigne. Desvigne & Dalnoky worked for public and private organizations and collaborated on projects with prominent architects including Renzo Piano, Norman Foster, Richard Rogers and Christian de Portzamparc. The agency has completed projects in Great Britain, Europe, Japan, South Korea and the United States. Notable projects by Desvigne & Dalnoky include landscape design for three stations on the LGV Méditerranée and open spaces at the Middelheim Open Air Sculpture Museum. In 2001, she won an award from the International Biennial of Landscape Architecture in Barcelona for her plan for the Greenwich Peninsula.

After 2002, she has worked through her "Atelier de Paysage" in Oppède, which she established in partnership with Patrick Solvet. In 2005, she submitted the winning design for the Metropolitan Water Park in Zaragoza for Expo 2008.

Dalnoky has taught landscape design in various European universities, including the National School of Landscape Architecture in Versailles, the Accademia di Architettura di Mendrisio, the École Polytechnique Fédérale de Lausanne and the Escuela Técnica Superior de Arquitectura de Barcelona.
