= Carlos Zapata =

Venezuela-born American architect

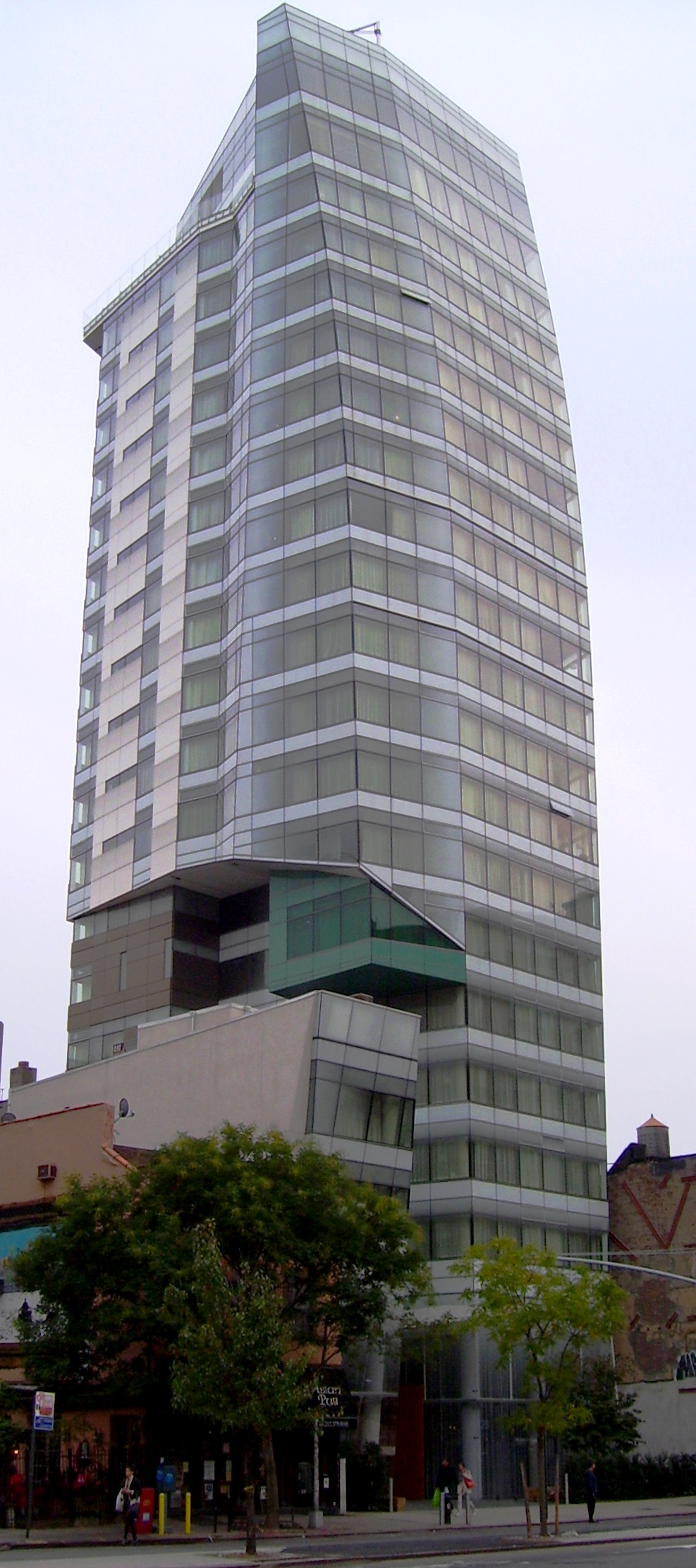
The Cooper Square Hotel in 2010

Carlos Zapata (born 1961 in Rubio, Venezuela) is an American architect, with his office headquartered in New York City.

== Career ==
Zapata is known for his work on the Bitexco Financial Tower in Ho Chi Minh City, the Cooper Square Hotel (now the Standard East Village) in Manhattan; the Fontainebleau hotel casino in Las Vegas, the JW Marriott Hotel in the Convention Center Campus of Hanoi, Vietnam and Concourse J at Miami International Airport, among many other projects.

Zapata is the principal of the self-titled architecture firm, "Carlos Zapata Studio". Previous to opening his own architectural practice, he was in partnership with Benjamin T. Wood (Wood + Zapata) and together with the Chicago-based firm of Lohan Caprile Goettsch, they designed the new Soldier Field in Chicago (completed in 2003).

Zapata received his Bachelor of Architecture degree from Pratt Institute and his Master of Architecture from Columbia University. in addition to his professional practice, Zapata has taught at numerous architecture schools and institutes, including Parsons School of Design, the University of Miami, and Northeastern University, where he taught a graduate studio focusing on High Rise Design.

In 2017, Zapata was commissioned with designing a luxury residential tower in Quito.

Zapata's current projects include luxury residential towers in Singapore and Miami; a two-tower mixed use complex in Angola the interior design of a clubhouse for the first and only private golf club St. Andrews and 315,000 square foot addition to Aventura Mall in Miami.
