= Meuse TGV station =

Railway station in France

Meuse TGV
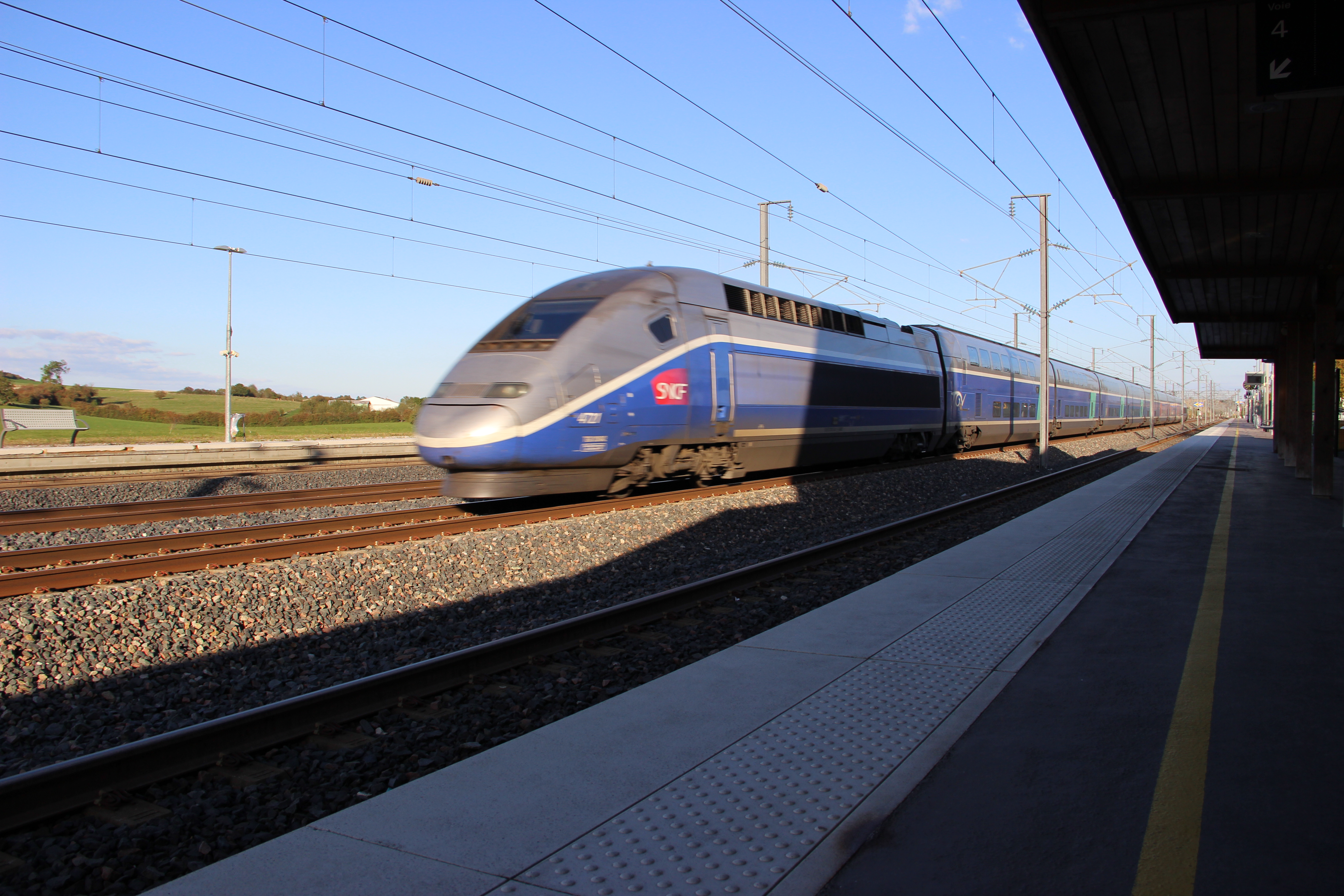

General information
- Location: Les Trois-Domaines, Meuse, Lorraine, France
- Coordinates: 48°58′42″N 5°16′18″E
- Line: LGV Est
- Platforms: 2
- Tracks: 4

History
- Opened: 2007

Services
Preceding station	SNCF	Following station
Champagne-Ardenne TGV towards Paris-Est	TGV inOui	Lorraine TGV towards Strasbourg
Champagne-Ardenne TGV towards Paris-Est	TGV inOui	Metz-Ville towards Luxembourg
Champagne-Ardenne TGV towards Paris-Est	TGV inOui	Nancy-Ville Terminus
Location

Meuse TGV is a railway station that opened in June 2007 along with the LGV Est, a TGV high-speed rail line from Paris to Strasbourg. It is located in Les Trois-Domaines, about 30 km from Verdun and Bar-le-Duc, France. Designed by Jean-Marie Duthilleul, director of architecture for the SNCF, it is the first timber-built station in France since Abbeville in 1856.

On 14 November 2015, a test train performing commissioning tests on the second phase of the LGV Est left Meuse TGV station headed to Strasbourg, but it derailed at a bridge over the Marne–Rhine Canal resulting in 11 deaths.
