= Appenweier =

- Municipality
- Flag Coat of arms

- Location of Appenweier within Ortenaukreis district
- Interactive map of Appenweier
- Location within Germany Location within Baden-Württemberg
- Coordinates: 48°32′23″N 7°58′48″E
- Country: Germany
- State: Baden-Württemberg
- Admin. region: Freiburg
- District: Ortenaukreis

Government
  - Mayor (2024–32): Viktor Lorenz

Area
  - Total: 38.02 km^{2} (14.68 sq mi)
- Elevation: 152 m (499 ft)

Population (2025-12-31)
  - Total: 10,367
  - Density: 272.7/km^{2} (706.2/sq mi)
- Time zone: UTC+01:00 (CET)
  - Summer (DST): UTC+02:00 (CEST)
- Postal codes: 77767
- Dialling codes: 07805
- Vehicle registration: OG, BH, KEL, LR, WOL
- Website: www.appenweier.de

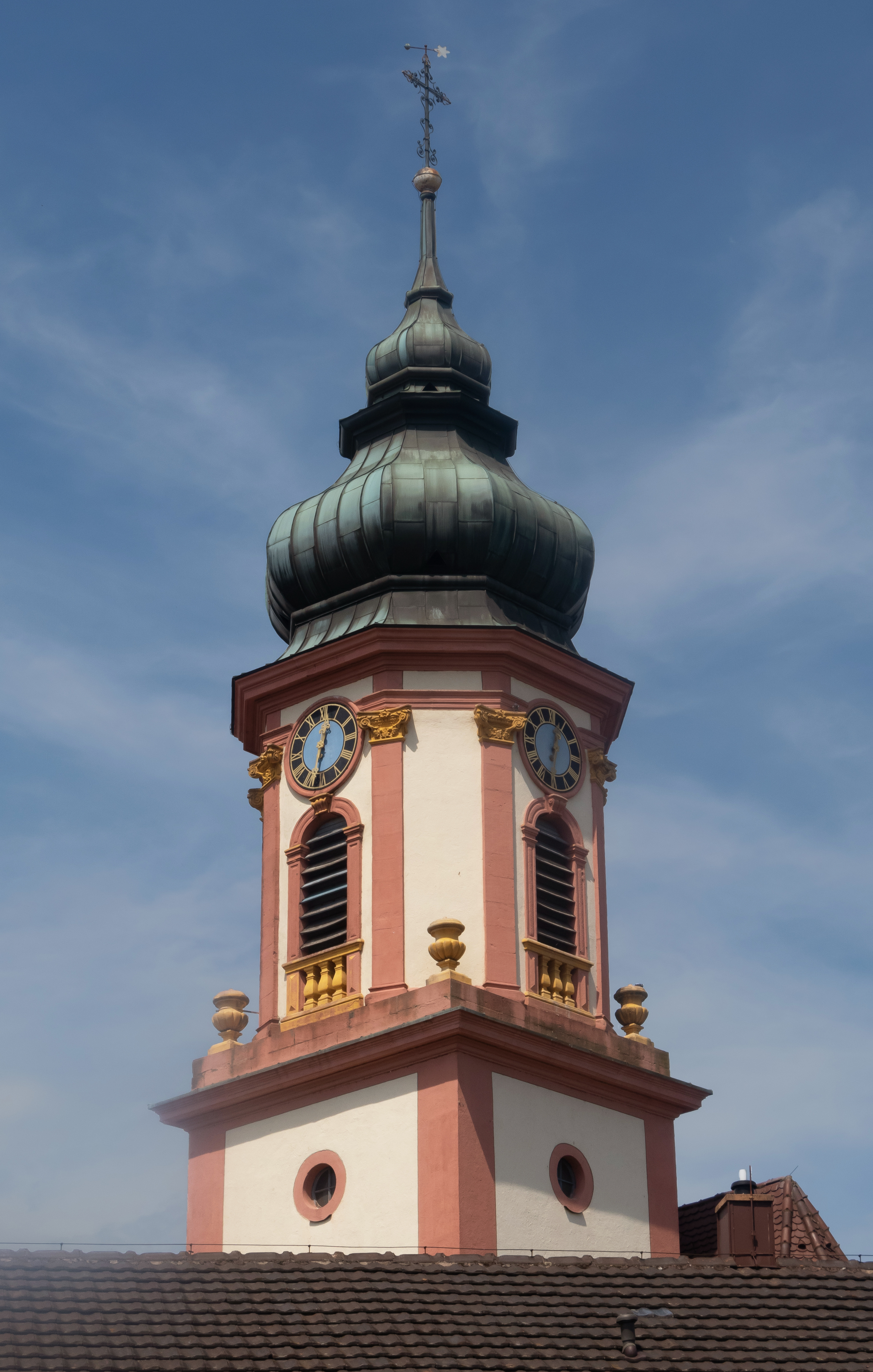
Appenweier, churchtower (Sankt Michaelkirche)

Appenweier (German pronunciation: [ˈapn̩vaɪɐ]; Low Alemannic: Appewiir) is a municipality in western Baden-Württemberg, Germany in the district of Ortenau.

== Geography ==
Appenweier consists of the main municipal Appenweier (4,075 inhabitants), Urloffen (4,301 inhabitants), known for horseradish-growing, and Nesselried (1,383 inhabitants). The Nesselried district runs through the Wannenbach valley, while Urloffen lies north of Appenweier.
