= Schiltach station =

Railway station in Schiltach, Germany

Schiltach
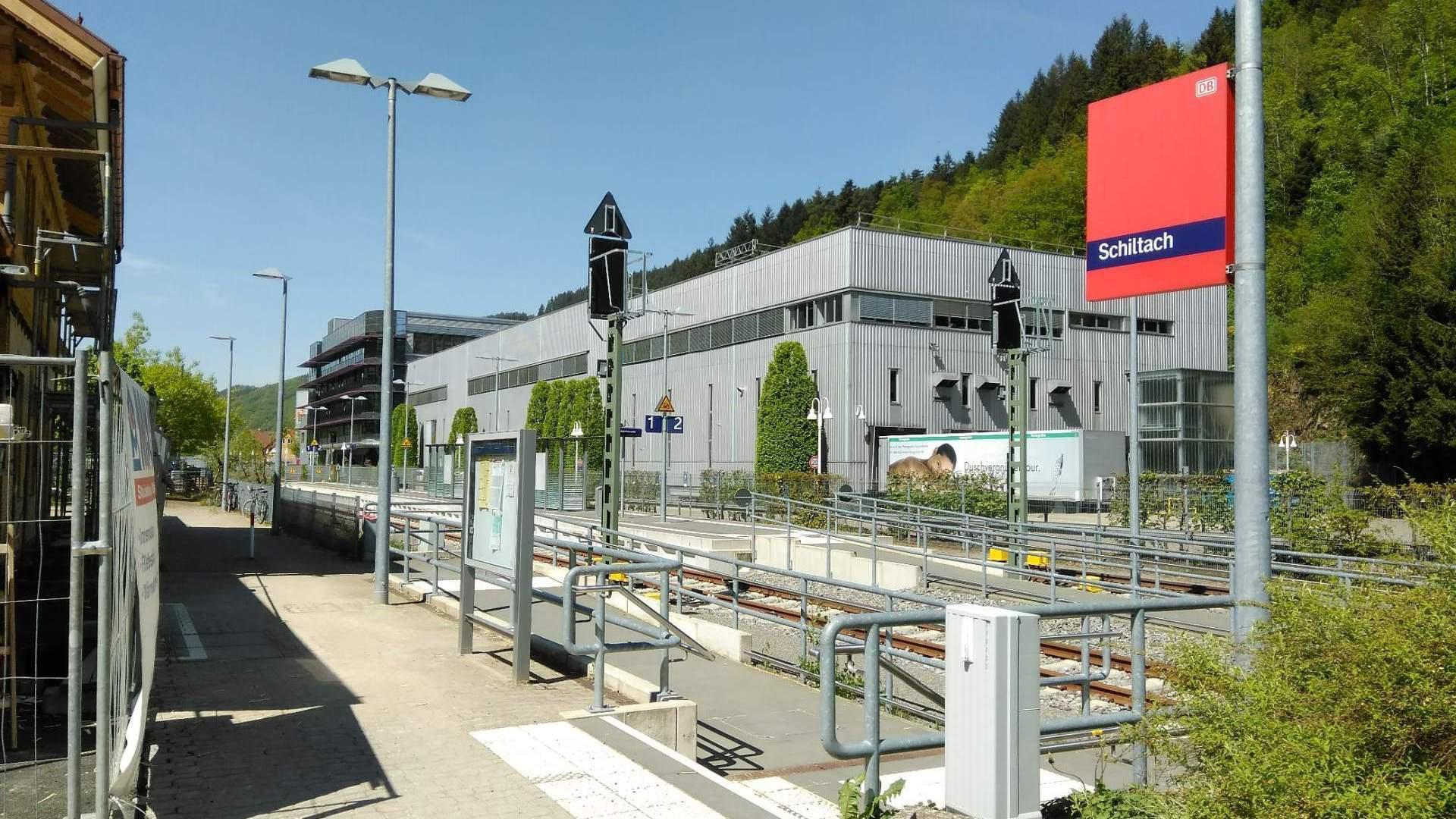
- The station platforms in 2018

General information
- Location: Schiltach, Baden-Württemberg; Germany
- Coordinates: 48°17′28″N 8°20′06″E
- Owner: Deutsche Bahn
- Lines: Kinzig Valley Railway (KBS 721); Eutingen im Gäu–Schiltach railway line (KBS 740); Schiltach-Schramberg railway (closed)
- Distance: 14.2 km (8.8 mi) from Hausach; 54.8 km (34.1 mi) from Eutingen im Gäu
- Platforms: 1 island platform
- Tracks: 2
- Train operators: SWEG
- Connections: Südbadenbus bus lines

Other information
- Station code: 5570
- DS100 code: RSCL
- IBNR: 8005350
- Category: 6
- Fare zone: 27 (VVR)

Services
Preceding station	(Offenburg)	Following station
Halbmeil towards Offenburg	RS 1	Schiltach Mitte towards Freudenstadt Hbf
Location

Schiltach station (German: Bahnhof Schiltach) is a railway station in the municipality of Schiltach, in Baden-Württemberg, Germany. It is located at the junction of the Kinzig Valley Railway and Eutingen im Gäu–Schiltach railway line of Deutsche Bahn. A third line, the Schiltach-Schramberg railway, formerly branched off to the southeast but was closed in 1990.

== Services ==
As of the December 2021 timetable change, the following services stop at Schiltach:

- RS 1: hourly service between Offenburg and Freudenstadt.
