= Halbmeil station =

Railway station in Germany

Halbmeil
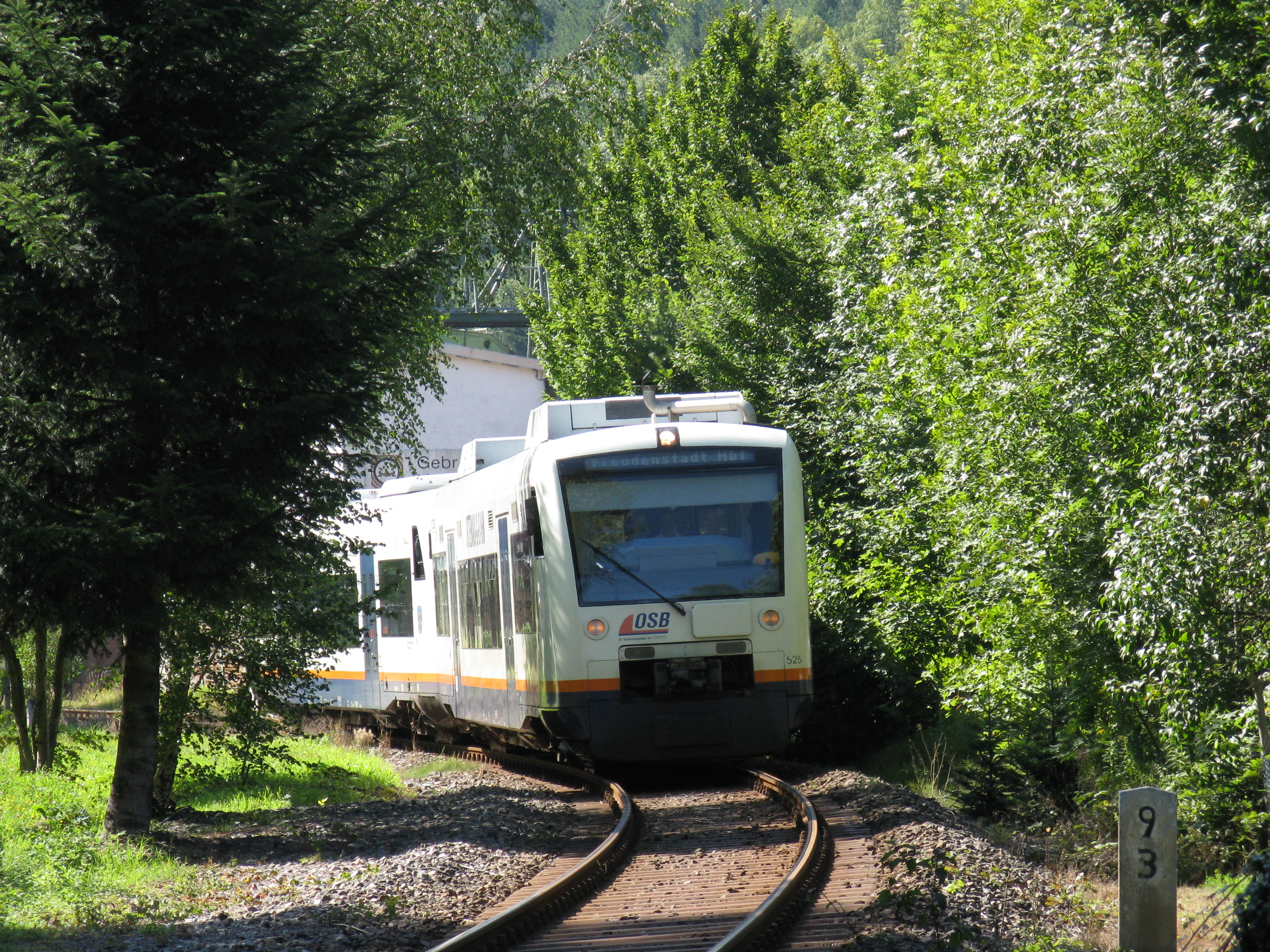
- An Ortenau-S-Bahn train departs Halbmeil in 2008

General information
- Location: Wolfach, Baden-Württemberg; Germany
- Coordinates: 48°17′27″N 8°16′14″E
- Owner: Deutsche Bahn
- Lines: Kinzig Valley Railway (KBS 721)
- Distance: 9.0 km (5.6 mi) from Hausach
- Platforms: 1 side platform
- Tracks: 1
- Train operators: SWEG
- Connections: Südbadenbus bus lines

Other information
- Station code: 2492
- DS100 code: RHAM
- IBNR: 8002533
- Category: 7
- Fare zone: 8 (TGO)

Services
| Preceding station | (Offenburg) | Following station |
|---|---|---|
| Wolfach towards Offenburg | RS 1 | Schiltach towards Freudenstadt Hbf |
Location

Halbmeil station (German: Bahnhof Halbmeil) is a railway station in the municipality of Wolfach, in Baden-Württemberg, Germany. It is located on the Kinzig Valley Railway of Deutsche Bahn.

== Services ==
As of the December 2021 timetable change, the following services stop at Halbmeil:

- RS 1: hourly service between Offenburg and Freudenstadt.
