= Kinzigtalbahn =

Kinzigtalbahn may refer to one of two railway lines in Germany:

- Kinzig Valley Railway (Hesse) from Frankfurt to Fulda in the state of Hesse
- Kinzig Valley Railway (Black Forest) from Hausach to Freudenstadt in the state of Baden-Württemberg
