= Kinzig Valley Railway =

Kinzig Valley Railway may refer to:

- Kinzig Valley Railway (Hesse) from Frankfurt to Fulda in the state of Hesse
- Kinzig Valley Railway (Black Forest) from Hausach to Freudenstadt in the state of Baden-Württemberg
