= Murg Valley Railway =

Railway line in Germany

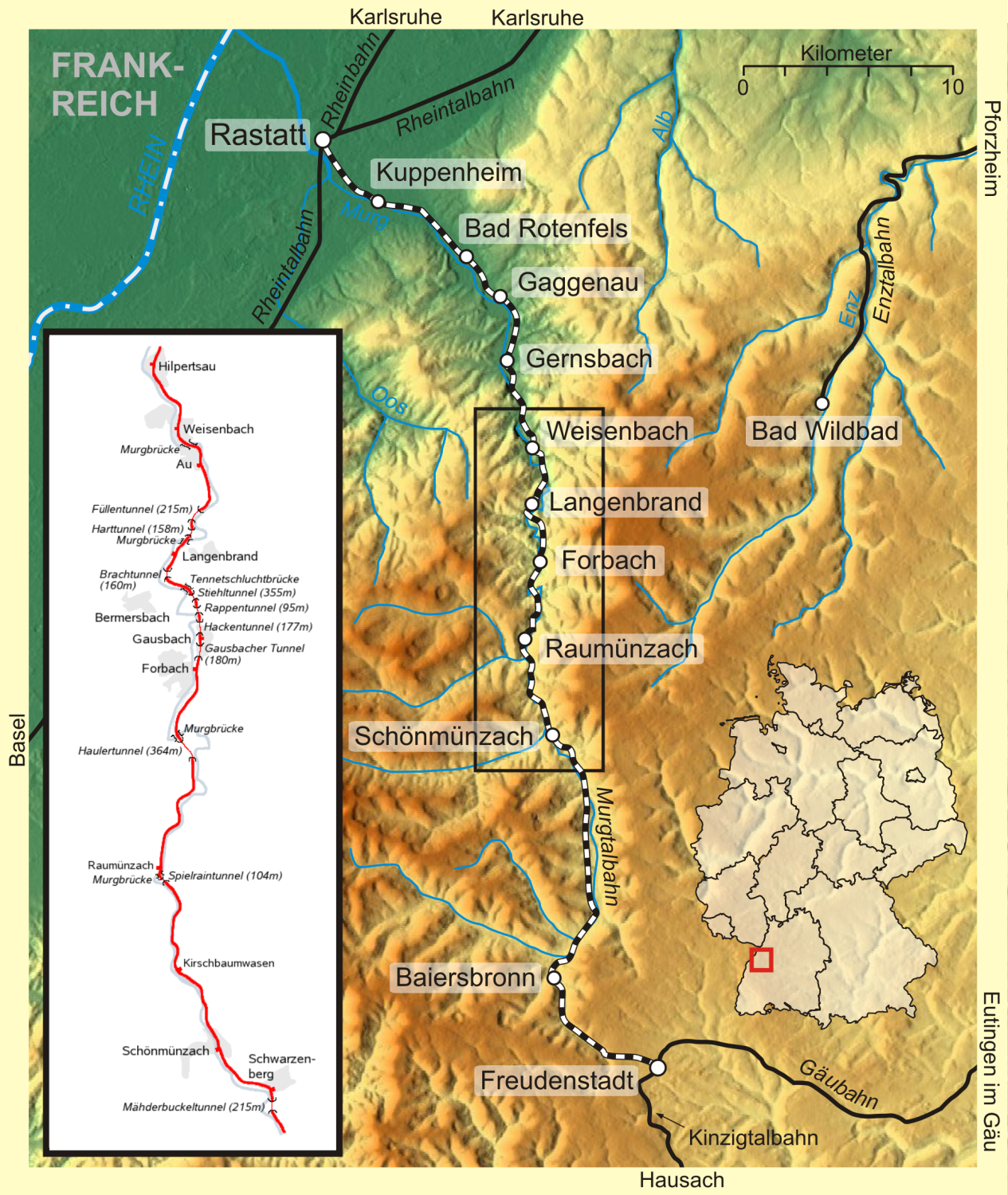

Overview
- Native name: Murgtalbahn
- Line number: 4240
- Locale: Baden-Württemberg, Germany
- Termini: Rastatt; Freudenstadt Hbf

Service
- Route number: 710.41

Technical
- Line length: 58.2 km (36.2 mi)
- Track gauge: 1,435 mm (4 ft 8 1/2 in) standard gauge
- Electrification: 15 kV/16.7 Hz AC overhead
- Maximum incline: 5%

The Murg Valley Railway (German: Murgtalbahn) is a 58 kilometre long railway line in the Northern Black Forest in Germany, that links Rastatt and Freudenstadt. It was opened in stages from 1868 to 1928 being built outwards from both Rastatt and Freudenstadt. The route through the narrow Murg Valley required the construction of numerous tunnels and bridges. The section between the stations of Baiersbronn and Freudenstadt Stadt is a steep ramp which is why it had to be operated until 1926 as a rack railway. Even today it can only be worked by vehicles that have the required approval.

After the occasional long-distance passenger services had been withdrawn in the 1990s, the Murg Valley Railway was integrated into the network of the Karlsruhe Stadtbahn between 2002 and 2004. Since then it has been operated by Albtal-Verkehrs-Gesellschaft (AVG), using their fleet of tram-trains. At Freudenstadt, these meet the services of the Ortenau S-Bahn (OSB), operating over the Kinzig Valley Railway to Offenburg.

== History ==
The line was constructed over the course of 60 years due to the difficult topography of the Murg valley, the numerous engineering works required and the fact that the lower Murg valley belonged to the Grand Duchy of Baden, while the upper Murg valley belonged to the Kingdom of Württemberg. This resulted in different transport policy interests, which prevented a single approach to long-term planning. So initially local interests in the lower Murg valley took the first steps in building the Murg Valley Railway. Over several decades the line emerged between Rastatt and Freudenstadt, starting as two branch lines at each end until the last remaining gap could be closed on the former border, which lies between Kirschbaumwasen and Schönmünzach.

=== Murg Valley Railway Company (1868-1894) ===
For centuries the Murg valley timber trade had been dependent on rafting until the middle of the 19th century, when the processing of timber increasingly shifted to higher value products, which could not be transported as a raft, including railway sleepers. The construction of roads in the narrow Murg Valley was particularly expensive. As neighboring Württemberg in the 1860s was already planning for the Enz Valley Railway and the Nagold Valley Railway, the local timber industry feared the loss of its ability to compete.

This showed that the valley needed an efficient transport link over its own railway. The Grand Duchy of Baden State Railways (Großherzogliche Badische Staatsbahn) had no interest, however, in the construction of such a line at that time because its financial resources were exhausted by the construction of major trunk lines. The private Murg Valley Railway Company (Murgthal-Eisenbahn-Gesellschaft) was founded in 1867, mainly at the instigation of Gernsbach timber manufacturer Casimir Rudolf Katz, with the aim of building a branch line from Rastatt to Gernsbach.

After receiving the concession for the line, construction started on 19 August 1868. Nine months later, on 31 May 1869, the 15 kilometer-long line was inaugurated. The line was operated by the Baden State Railways on behalf of the Murg Valley Railway Company.

The construction of the railway line in the lower Murg valley accelerated the Industrial Revolution around the towns of Gaggenau and Gernsbach. The Gaggenau ironworks, opened in 1873, was the first major industrial operation in the district. Further upstream a centre of paper production developed from the 1880s with the establishment of several factories, aided by the substantial resources of forests and water. Soon, industrial companies requested an extension of the line to the south from Gernsbach. Initially the extension of the line as a horse-drawn railway was considered, but failed to proceed due to lack of funding. Only in 1888 was a new initiative successful. After the grant of a license and the building of the rail facilities, an extension was put into operation from Gernsbach to Weisenbach on 1 May 1894. Again the line was owned by the Murg Valley Railway Company and operated by the Baden State Railways.

=== Construction by the state railways of Wurttemberg and Baden (1894–1919) ===
Freudenstadt, which is situated high above the upper Murg valley, had in 1879 received a connection towards Stuttgart with the completion of the Gäu Railway, part of the Württemberg rail network. Because of the difficult topographical conditions, the station, now Freudenstadt Central Station (Freudenstadt Hauptbahnhof), is located well to the south of the centre of the town. In order to improve the integration of Freudenstadt and serve the upper Murg valley better, the parliament of Württemberg decided in 1898 to build a branch line from the Freudenstadt central station via Baiersbronn to Reichenbach Priory (Klosterreichenbach).

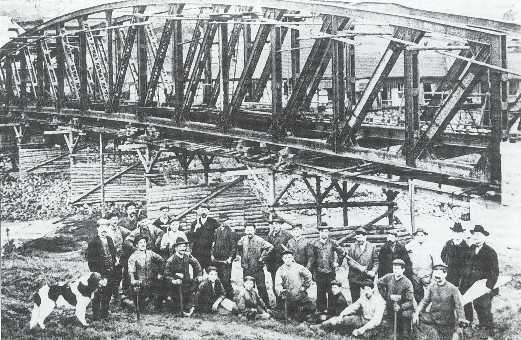
Murg bridge near Weisenbach under construction (1909)

Because of the large differences in height between Freudenstadt and Baiersbronn, the routing of the line was difficult. Finally, the Freudenstadt Central Station–Freudenstadt Stadt–Baiersbronn section was adopted, with maximum gradients of up to 5.0 percent, as a rack railway using the Riggenbach-Klose system. The station buildings were built according to various types of standardised designs to limit costs. The Royal Württemberg State Railways started operations to Klosterreichenbach on 20 November 1901.

On 1 July 1904 the Grand Duchy of Baden State Railways took over the lower Murg Valley Railway from the Murg Valley Railway Company, so that ownership and operations were now integrated. With the decision of the Baden parliament to complete the railway network in 1900, the foundations for further construction of the Murg Valley Railway were created. This provided for the extension of the lower Murg Valley Railway from Weisenbach to the border. However, the alignment of the route proved to be difficult because of the topography: the six-kilometre section from Weisenbach to Forbach required the construction of seven tunnels, three major bridges and major earthworks. On 14 June 1910, the Weisenbach–Forbach section was put into operation after three years of construction and this was followed by the section to Raumünzach opened on 4 May 1915. Completion of the line to the border was prevented by the First World War.

=== Closing of the gap by Deutsche Reichsbahn ===
While the desire was expressed for a continuous Murg Valley Railway from Rastatt to Freudenstadt in Baden quite early, the state of Württemberg behaved rather negatively, as there was a fear that traffic from the northern Black Forest would migrate towards Karlsruhe, while at that time freight and passengers mainly travelled over the line to Stuttgart. With the completion of negotiations of a treaty in 1908 covering the design and construction of the line and regulating cross-border railway operations, Wurtemberg finally agreed to a continuous Murg Valley Railway. Nevertheless, the ratification of this treaty was delayed to 1912. It was planned to close the gap in 1916. Despite the signing of contracts, however, no construction work started on the Württemberg section.

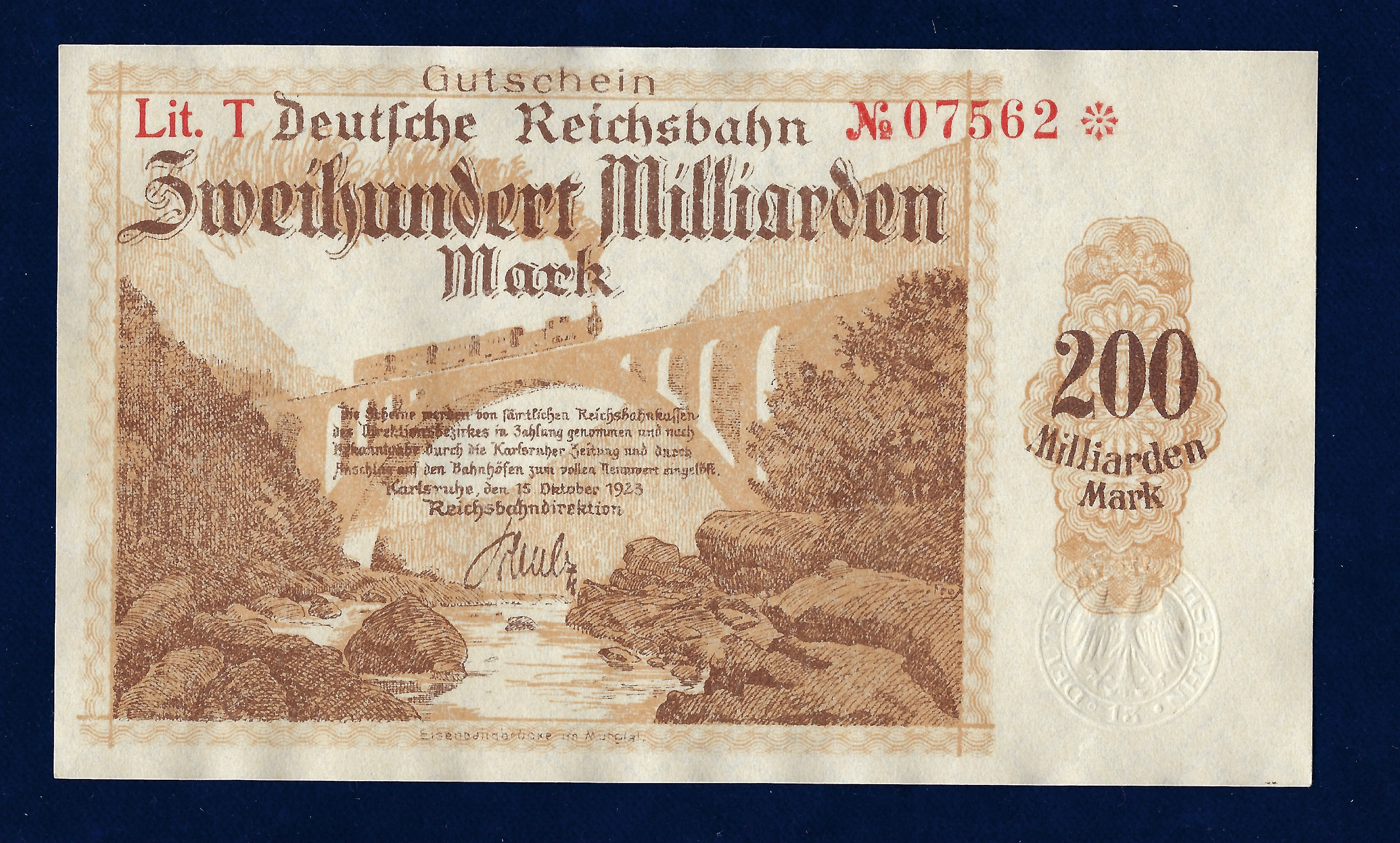
Murg Valley Railway Bridge (Murgtalbahn Brücke) on 200 billion Mark Notgeld banknote 1923

The founding of Deutsche Reichsbahn in 1920 overcame the conflicts of interest between Baden and Württemberg, leading to the missing intermediate section between Raumünzach and Klosterreichenbach finally being commissioned on 13 July 1928. This made possible the operations of trains from Rastatt to Freudenstadt, but locomotive still had to be changed for the trip up the steep line in Freudenstadt.

The construction of the Schwarzenbach dam from 1922 to 1926 led to substantial traffic at Raumünzach station, since materials were conveyed with the help of a light railway (Feldbahn) from Raumünzach station.

=== Second World War ===
During the Second World War was the Murg Valley Railway was at first spared from damage. It was not until the advance of the front in September 1944 that several attacks by fighter-bombers and artillery caused damage and line closures, mainly affecting Rastatt station. The attack on Freudenstadt at the end of 1944, severely damaged the railway facilities at the southern terminus of the line and completely destroyed Freudenstadt Stadt station. The most serious damage to the Murg Valley Railway, however, was not carried out by the Allies, but inflicted by retreating German troops in April 1945, when they destroyed the Murg bridges in Weisenbach, Langenbrand and Forbach and the Christophstal viaduct.

After the war, the destroyed bridges and line were reconstruction over five years. First, trains could only run between Rastatt and Weisenbach. At the end of 1945 an additional shuttle service was established between Raumünzach and Baiersbronn. After the restoration of Murg bridges in Weisenbach and Langenbrand, services on the line between Weisenbach and Forbach were resumed in July 1947. The gap between Forbach and Raumünzach was closed in November 1947. Freudenstadt Stadt station was reached from the south in October 1948. After the restoration of the Christophstal viaduct, trains could run over the whole Murg Valley Railway on 14 May 1950.

=== Deutsche Bundesbahn operations after the Second World War ===
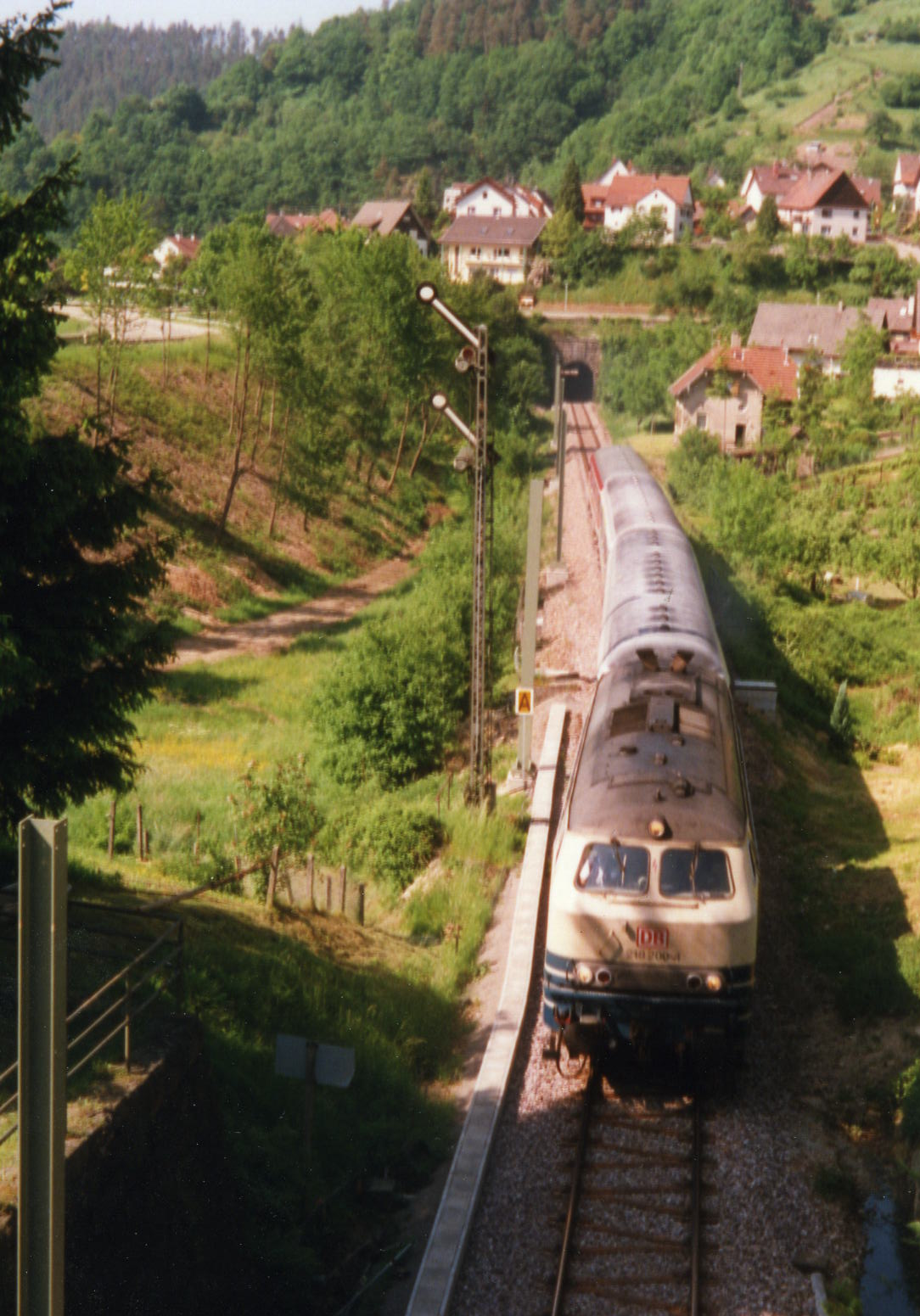
Push-pull train with class 218 locomotive near Gausbach (2001)

In 1966 steam locomotives on the Murg Valley Railway were replaced by diesel locomotives, which allowed the dropping of the locomotive change for the steep section and led to an acceleration of services. This allowed travel times to be reduced from the approximately two and a half hours for the Rastatt–Freudenstadt route during the steam locomotive era to around one hour and 20 minutes.

The increasing economic pressure on Deutsche Bundesbahn in the 1980s led to rationalisation measures. Therefore, the lightly used stops at Friedrichstal, Kirschbaumwasen, Raumünzach and Au were abandoned and the crossing loops in Hilpertsau, Raumünzach and Klosterreichenbach were dismantled. Above all, the parallel federal highway 462 was increasingly competitive with the Murg Valley Railway.

In the late 1980s, class 628 diesel multiple units (DMUs) were used alongside the locomotive-hauled trains on the Murg Valley Railway, but they were not approved to operate over the steep section and therefore could only operate between Rastatt and Baiersbronn. In the interim, class 627.0 DMUs took over operations between Baiersbronn and Freudenstadt.

In 1995, the timetable was improved by the introduction of an approximately hourly service. Similarly, DMUs were largely replaced with locomotive-hauled trains. In addition until the mid-1990s, some D-trains or InterRegio trains also ran on the line; these were important for the tourism from the Ruhr area to the northern Black Forest.

=== Modernisation and conversion to light rail operation ===
Preliminary proposals for the integration of Murg Valley Railway with the Karlsruhe Stadtbahn were developed in the early 1990s. Since the Murg Valley Railway axis extends centrally through the settlements of the Murg, there were a large number of potential passengers who were not using the existing undeveloped rail services.

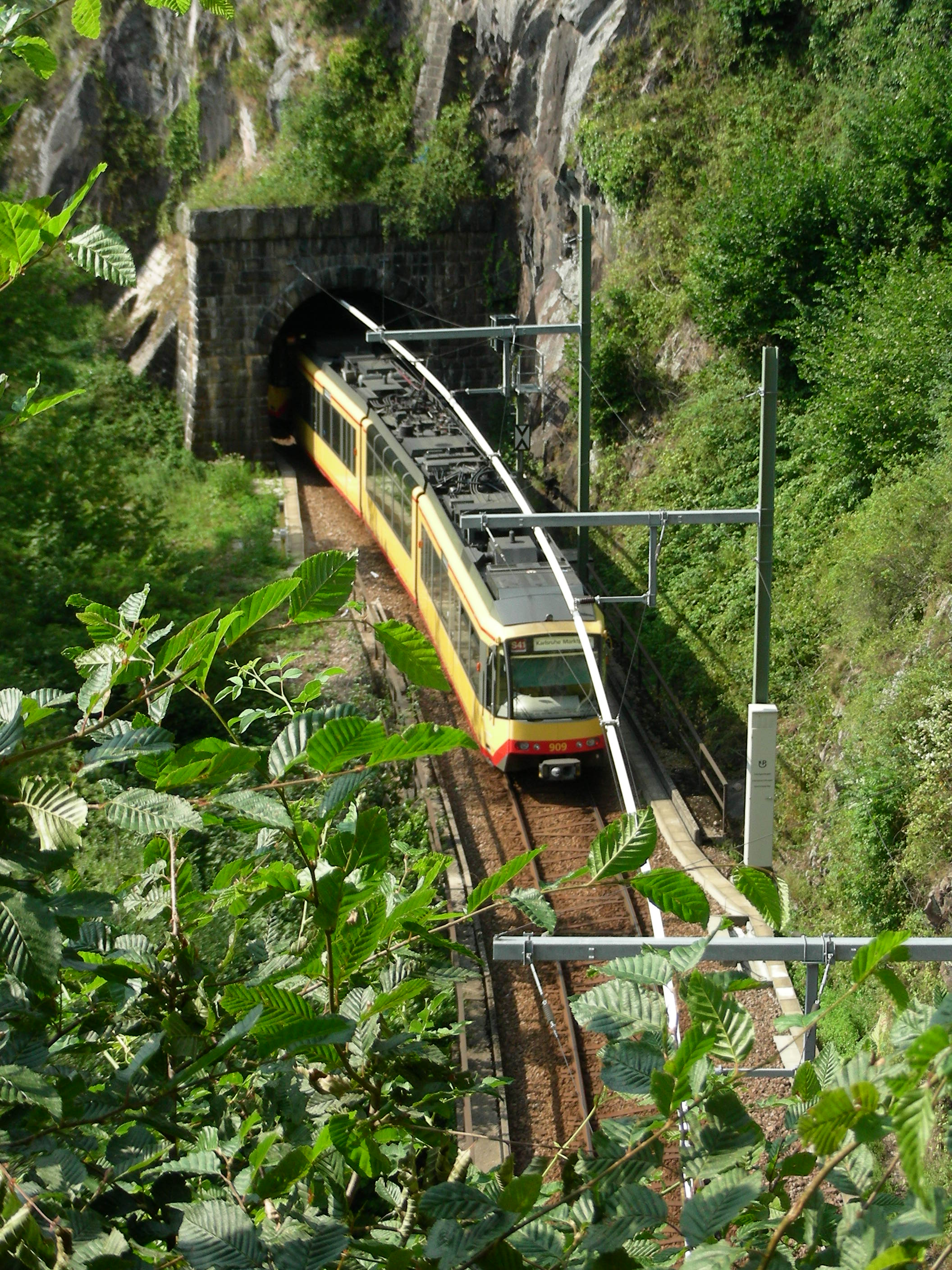
The catanery in the numerous tunnels required special technical solutions: overhead conductor rail between Stiehl Tunnel and Rappen Tunnel

With the political support of the rural districts (Landkreis) of Rastatt and Freudenstadt, the Albtal-Verkehrs-Gesellschaft (Alb Valley Transport Company, AVG), leased the Murg Valley Railway from Deutsche Bahn until 2000 by lease and upgraded it in subsequent years for light rail operations. The renovations included the electrification of the line on the 15 kV AC 16.7 Hz system, duplication between Kuppenheim and Bad Rotenfels, the construction or reconstruction of crossing loops in Hörden, Hilpertsau, Langenbrand, Raumünzach and Heselbach, the construction of 14 new stations and the upgrading the existing stations, replacement of the signal and safety systems and the rehabilitation of bridges and tunnels. During the electrification of the tunnel sections, for the first time in Germany, overhead conductor rail was installed on open line. This rail could be supported by masts outside the tunnel so that the number of masts required could be significantly reduced. A total of € 53 million was invested in infrastructure.

On 15 June 2002, Stadtbahn operations commenced in the lower Murg valley between Rastatt and Raumünzach, temporarily requiring a change of trains in Raumünzach. The conversion of the section to Freudenstadt Stadt followed on 14 December 2003 and the remaining section to the Freudenstadt Hbf opened on 20 May 2004. The Stadtbahn operation enabled the running of additional services and a reduction in travel times. Stadtbahn express services between Rastatt and Freudenstadt took only 67 minutes. As a result, passenger numbers increased considerably: before the conversion about 2,700 passengers travelled on the Murg Valley Railway on weekdays, while in 2009 there were almost 13,000 passengers on weekdays.

During the switch to Stadtbahn operation, the Murg Valley Railway was also integrated into the local transport association networks. Between Rastatt and Kirschbaumwasen its fares are set by the Karlsruher Verkehrsverbund (Karlsruhe transport association, KVV); between Schönmünzach and Freudenstadt fares are set by the Verkehrs-Gemeinschaft Landkreis Freudenstadt (transport community of the district of Freudenstadt, VGF). In addition, there is a transitional rate, so that VGF tickets are accepted to and from Forbach.

Today, all passenger services on the Murg Valley Railway are operated by AVG. It operates the Stadtbahn line S 31 (Odenheim–) Karlsruhe Hauptbahnhof–Rastatt–Freudenstadt and line S 41 Karlsruhe Innenstadt–Rastatt–Freudenstadt–Eutingen, with some services of the S 31 operating as express services and thus running about 25 minutes faster. Services use rolling stock that is designed to use the Karlsruhe Stadtbahn's two electrical systems (15 kV AC 16.7 Hz and 750 v DC). The trains run at least hourly and express trains run every two hours. On Sundays and public holidays, an express service runs from Mannheim to Freudenstadt via Karlsruhe with a DB Class 111 locomotive hauling two modernised n-cars with automatic doors and two conventional n-cars.

Freight traffic is operated by the AVG using diesel locomotives. On weekdays, a freight train runs from Karlsruhe via Rastatt to the Murg valley. In the two-track Kuppenheim–Bad Rotenfels section there are two major railway sidings: near Bischweier serving the Kronospan company and in Bad Rotenfels serving Lang Recycling. These two companies are currently the main customers for freight on the line.

== Route ==
The Murg Valley Railway passes through a Black Forest valley, which in places forms a gorge. Until the 18th century the middle section was hardly accessible. On sections there is still very little room for the line between the Murg and the rock walls. With its ten tunnels, eight bridges and steep sections, the line includes a series of solutions to technical challenges.

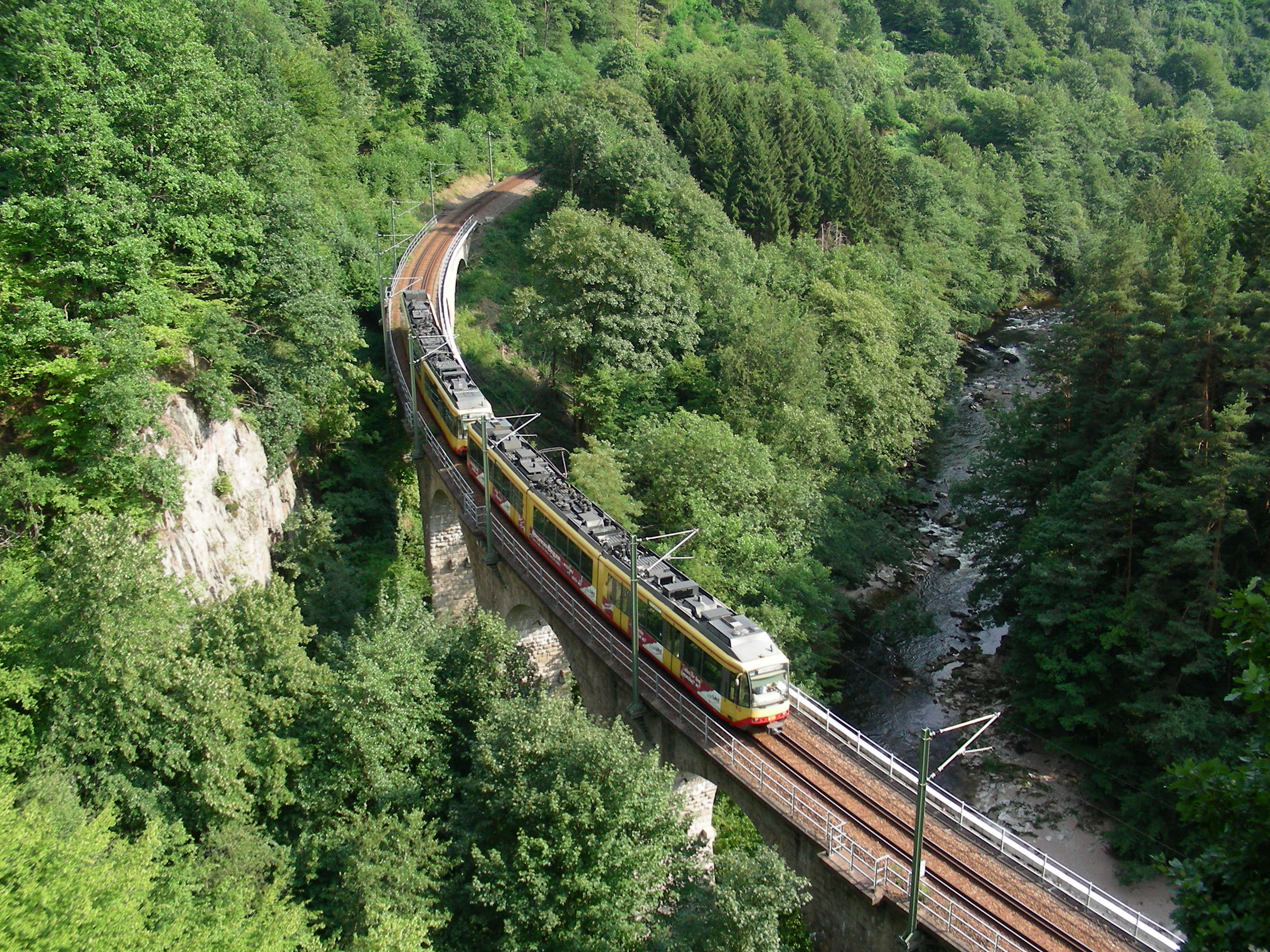
Tennetschlucht bridge between Langenbrand and Gausbach

The line starts in Rastatt station and runs from the southern end of the station area to the east on the northern bank of the Murg river through an industrial area. After about a kilometre, it reaches a halt created in 2002, Rastatt Beinle. Subsequently, the line crosses the open fields of the Upper Rhine Plain to Kuppenheim station. From here it leaves the plane and now runs along the Murg Valley through the halts of Bischweier and Bad Rotenfels Schloss.

The section of the line from Kuppenheim to Bad Rotenfels station was duplicated in preparation for opening of the Stadtbahn, all other sections of Murg Valley Railway are single track. From Bad Rotenfels the Murg Valley Railway crosses into the town of Gaggenau, passing through the halt of Bad Rotenfels Weinbrennerstraße to the three-track station of Gaggenau. South of Gaggenau station the line runs through the Mercedes-Benz factory, where in addition to a siding there is a halt for the company's employees.

Next, the line follows the Murg Valley to the south, past the halts of Ottenau and Hörden and finally reaches Gernsbach station, which has several tracks for freight and passenger transport. Between the halts of Ottenau and Hörden is a two-track operations station with sidings, where delayed trains may pass.

South of Gernsbach are the halts of Gernsbach Mitte and Obertsrot and the stations of Hilpertsau and Weisenbach, which both have crossing loops. The most scenic and technically difficult part of the Murg Valley Railway begins in Weisenbach. Near Schönmünzach the Murg valley narrows to become a gorge, so that the railway has to run on the steep slopes of the valley. It was necessary to build nine tunnels and five viaducts on this section.

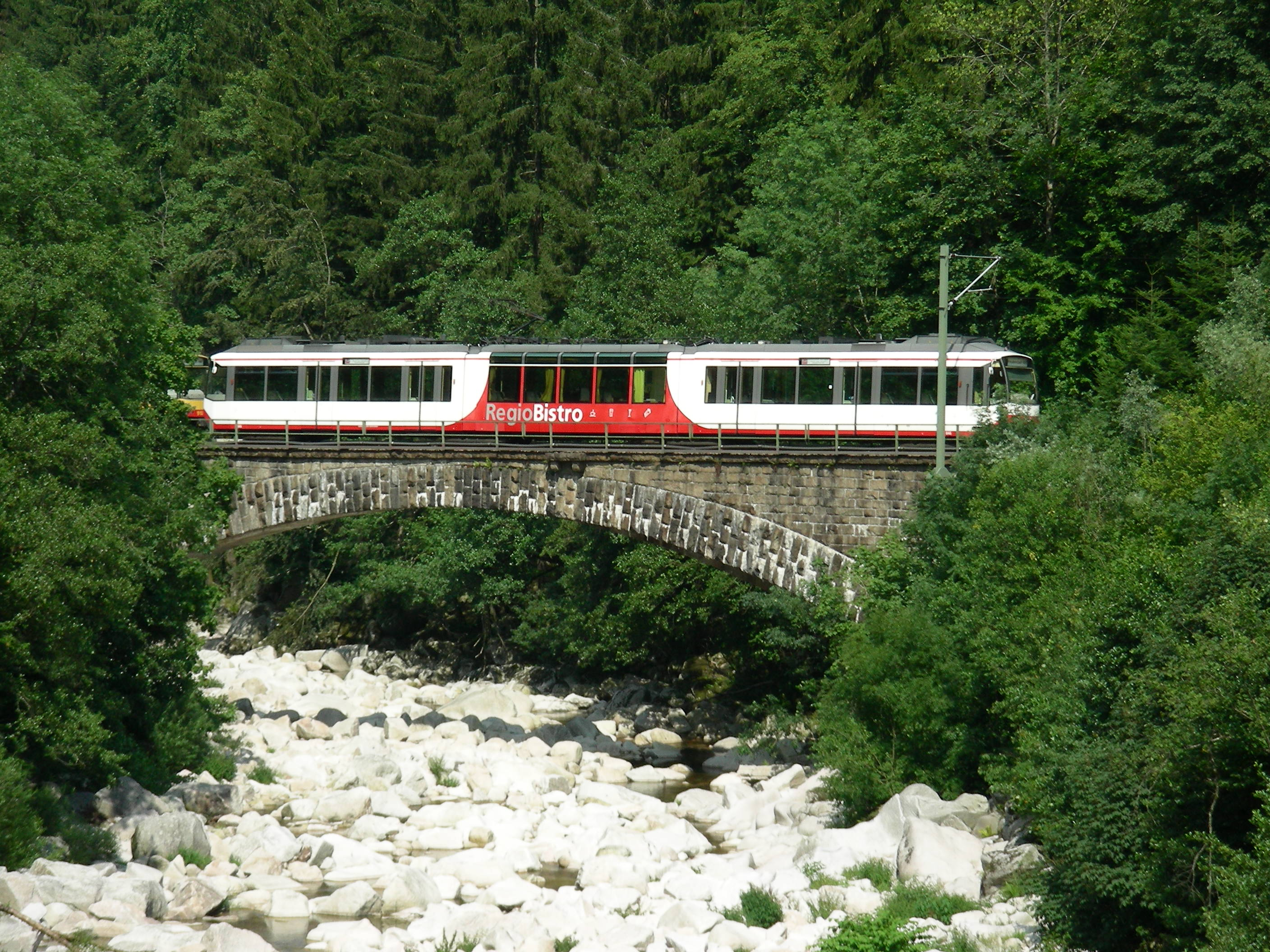
Murg bridge near Raumünzach

South of Weisenbach station, the line crosses the Murg on a 76-metre-long steel truss bridge and climbs the western slope of the Murg. After passing through the halt of Au and the Füllen and Hart tunnels, the line crosses the Murg again on a 127-metre-long bridge. This was originally built as an entirely brick arch bridge, which was destroyed during the Second World War and afterwards it received a steel central section, while the outer parts of the brick bridge were retained. The line then reaches the double-track station of Langenbrand.

Next, the line runs on the eastern slope of the Murg, crossing a mountain spur through the Brach tunnel and reaches the imposing, 183 metre-long and 27 metre-high stone bridge over the Tennetschlucht. This is directly connected to Stiehl tunnel and the line runs through the Rappen tunnel and the Hacken tunnel before reaching the halt of Gausbach, opened in 2002. After passing through the Gausbach tunnel, the Murg Valley Railway reaches Forbach station, which in addition to two running lines built in 2002, has an additional bay track for trains terminating here and a two-track carriage depot. Forbach also has the AVG's line controllers' office for the line. From Weisenbach to Forbach the line has to overcome a climb of 123.5 metres, which corresponds with an average gradient of 2.0 percent.

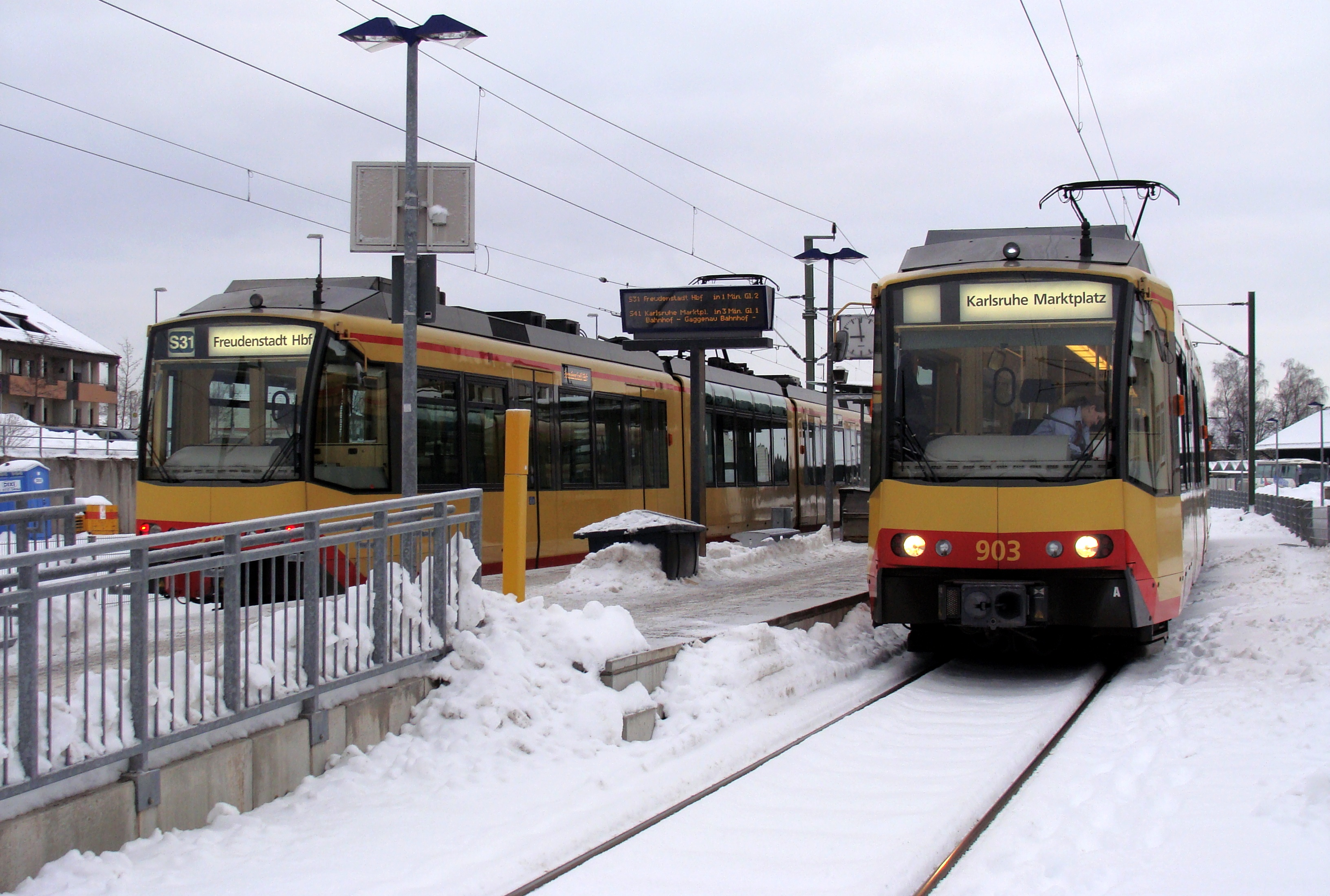
Freudenstadt Stadt station is the highest point on the Murg Valley Railway

South of Forbach, the line climbs to Schönmünzach station over a ten kilometre-long section that runs through an almost uninhabited, wooded area. Raumünzach station and Kirschbaumwasen halt are almost exclusively used as starting points for boat trips. Raumünzach station is also passing place for trains. South of Forbach and near Raumünzach the Murg Valley Railway crosses the Murg on bridges. While the stone bridge at Forbach was destroyed during the Second World War and rebuilt as a steel-truss structure, the bridge in Raumünzach is still a brick vault bridge. Each of the two bridges has a tunnel nearby to the south: the Haul tunnel, 364 metres long and the longest tunnel on the Murg Valley Railway, and the Spielrain tunnel. Between Kirschbaumwasen and Schönmünzach the line crosses the former border between Baden and Württemberg.

South of Schönmünzach, the line runs through the halts of Schwarzenberg, Huzenbach and Röt, the newly established passing station of Heselbach, the halts of Klosterreichenbach and Baiersbronn Schule and Baiersbronn station. It passes under a rocky outcrop through the Mähderbuckel tunnel south of Schwarzenberg. The line crosses the Murg south of Huzenbach and north of Heselbach.

The final section of the Murg Valley Railway runs from Baiersbronn out of the Murg valley to its highest point at Freudenstadt Stadt (town) station and it then drop to Freudenstadt Central Station (Hauptbahnhof). To cope with these differences in height, this section climbs at a maximum gradient of 5.0 percent. First built as a rack railway, it was converted to friction operation between 1924 and 1926. Even today this section has special operating requirements and only vehicles with special authorisation may be on the section. On the steep section is the 84 metre-long stone Christoph viaduct and the halts of Friedrichstal, Freudenstadt Schulzentrum and Freudenstadt Industriegebiet.

=== The infrastructure ===
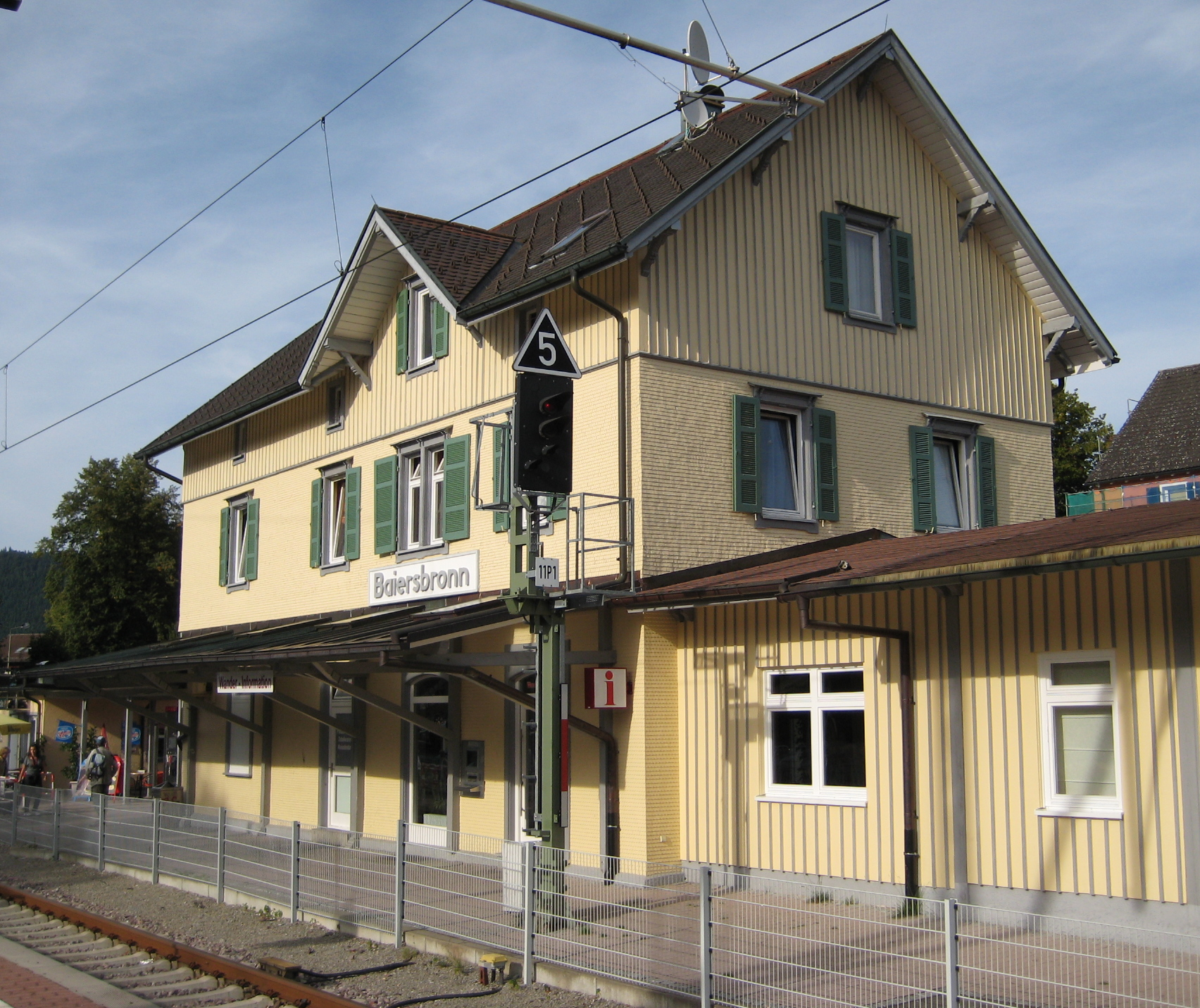
Württemberg standard station in Baiersbronn

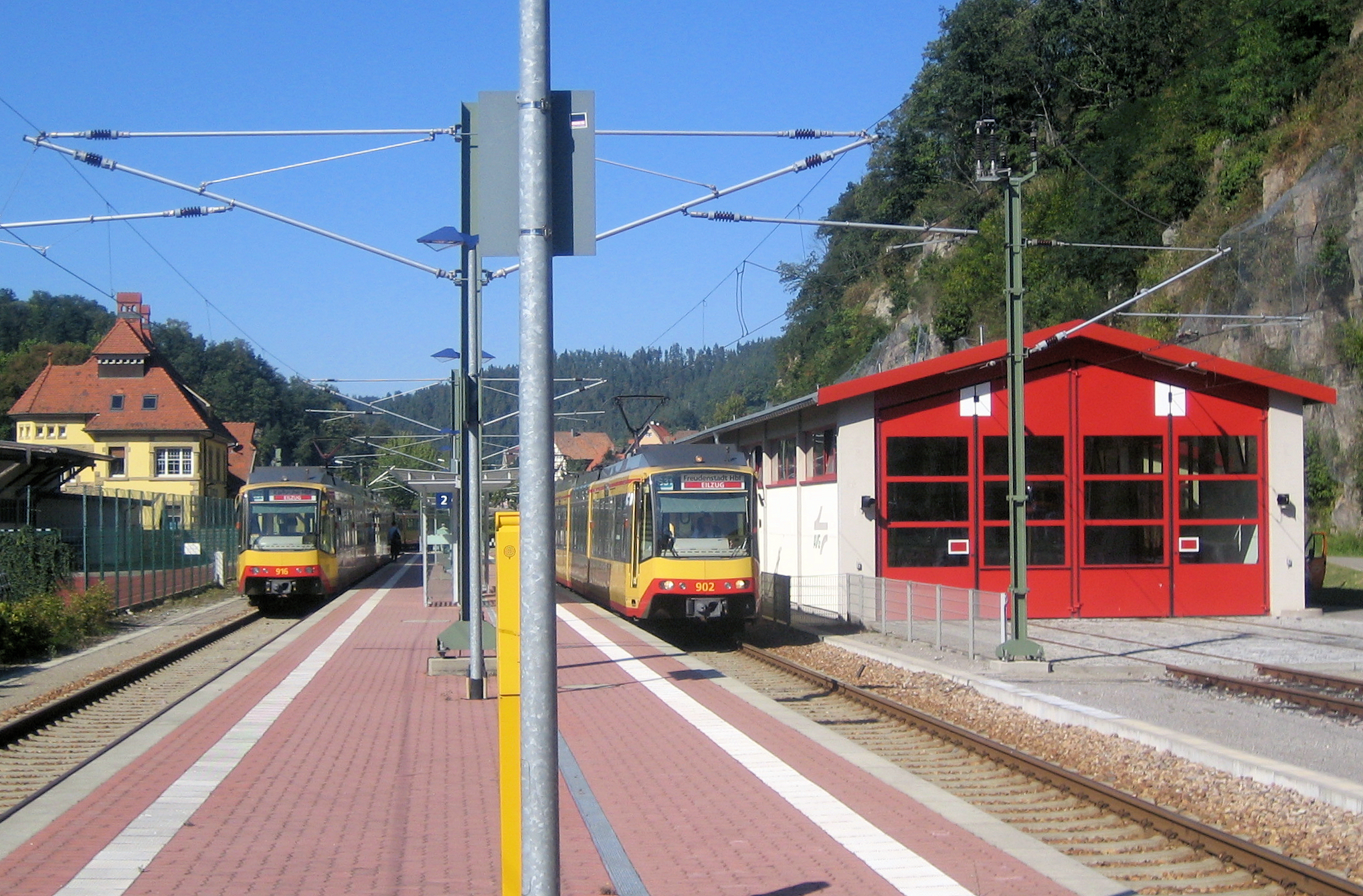
Newly built EMUs in Forbach station

The track infrastructure has been maintained since 2000 by the AVG; DB Netz is responsible for the terminuses in Rastatt and Freudenstadt. A Bahnmeisterei (the office of the director of track maintenance) is located in Forbach. The route is electrified and equipped with colour light signals, which are controlled centrally from the signal box in Gernsbach. With the exception of the double-track section between Kuppenheim and Bad Rotenfels the line is single track. Stations with crossing loops are in Gaggenau, Hörden (operations station only), Gernsbach, Hilpertsau, Weisenbach, Langenbrand, Forbach, Raumünzach, Schönmünzach, Heselbach, Baiersbronn and Freudenstadt Stadt. The line is operated as a branch line; the line speed varies between sections between 60 and 100 km/h. For the steep route between Freudenstadt and Baiersbronn there are special operating rules. The stations are 120 metres long and the platforms are 55 centimetres high, making possible level entry to the carriages.

There are sidings for freight transport for the Kronospan company (Bischweier), Lang Recycling (Bad Rotenfels), Hörden timber (at Hörden operating station), Mercedes-Benz (Gaggenau), Mayr-Melnhof (Obertsrot), Smurfit Kappa (Weisenbach) and Stora Enso (Langenbrand). While Kronospan and Lang Recycling are still served regularly, the other sidings are closed. In addition, until the early 1990s, there was a railway siding south of Weisenbach station that was several kilometres long and ran to the east of the Murg below Füllen tunnel. The line has its own sidings at the stations in Kuppenheim, Gernsbach Schönmünzach and Baiersbronn.

== Rolling stock ==
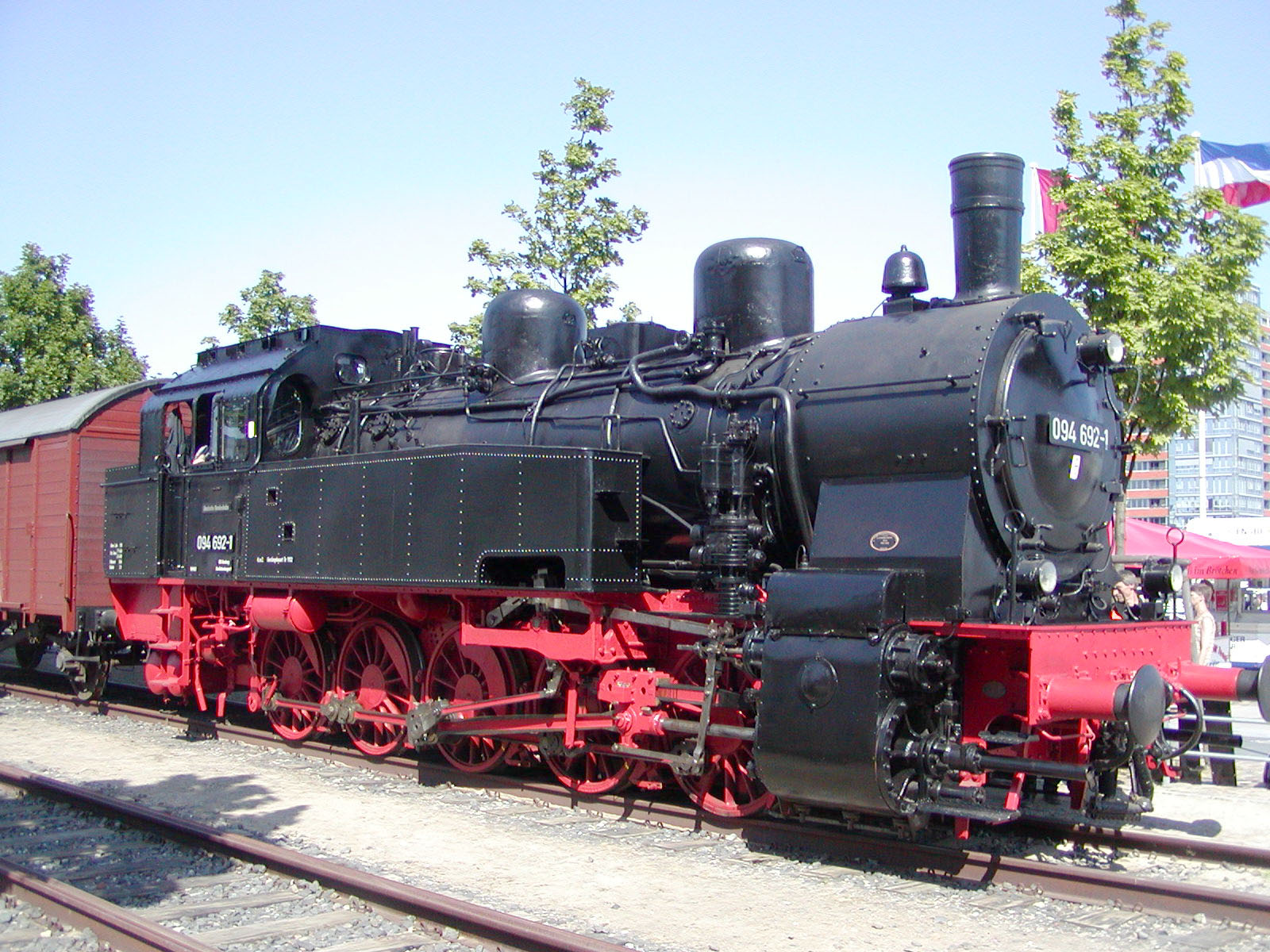
The introduction of Prussian class T 16.1 locomotives from 1924 ended the need for rack operations

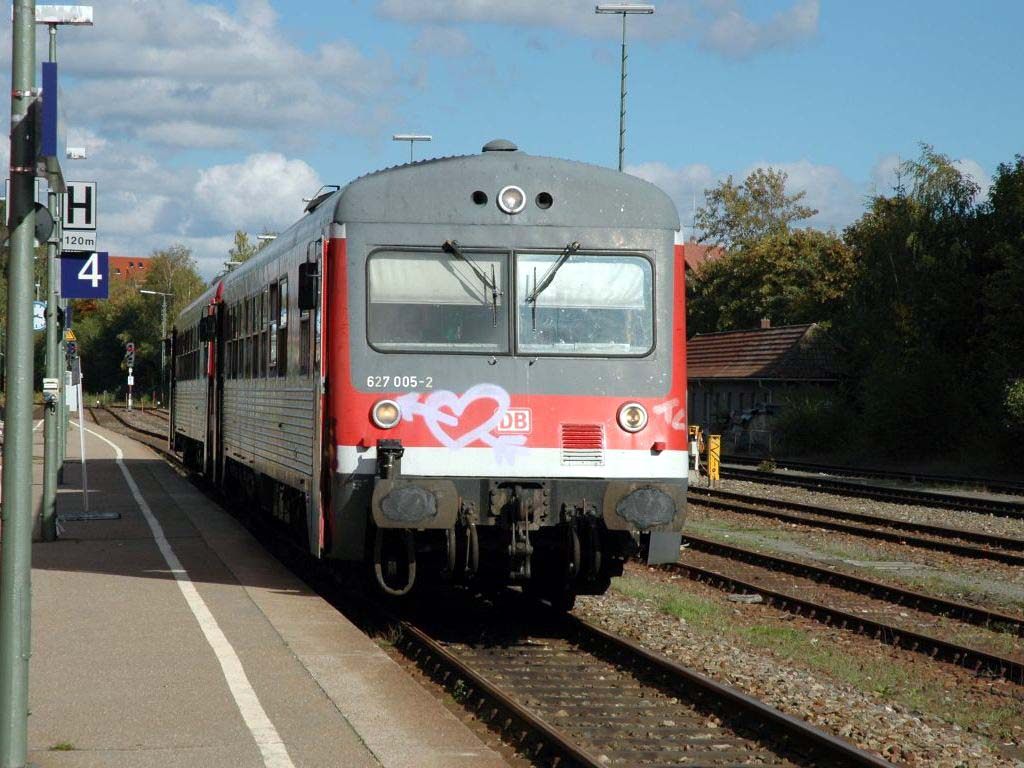
Class 627.0 DMU (Freudenstadt, 2004)

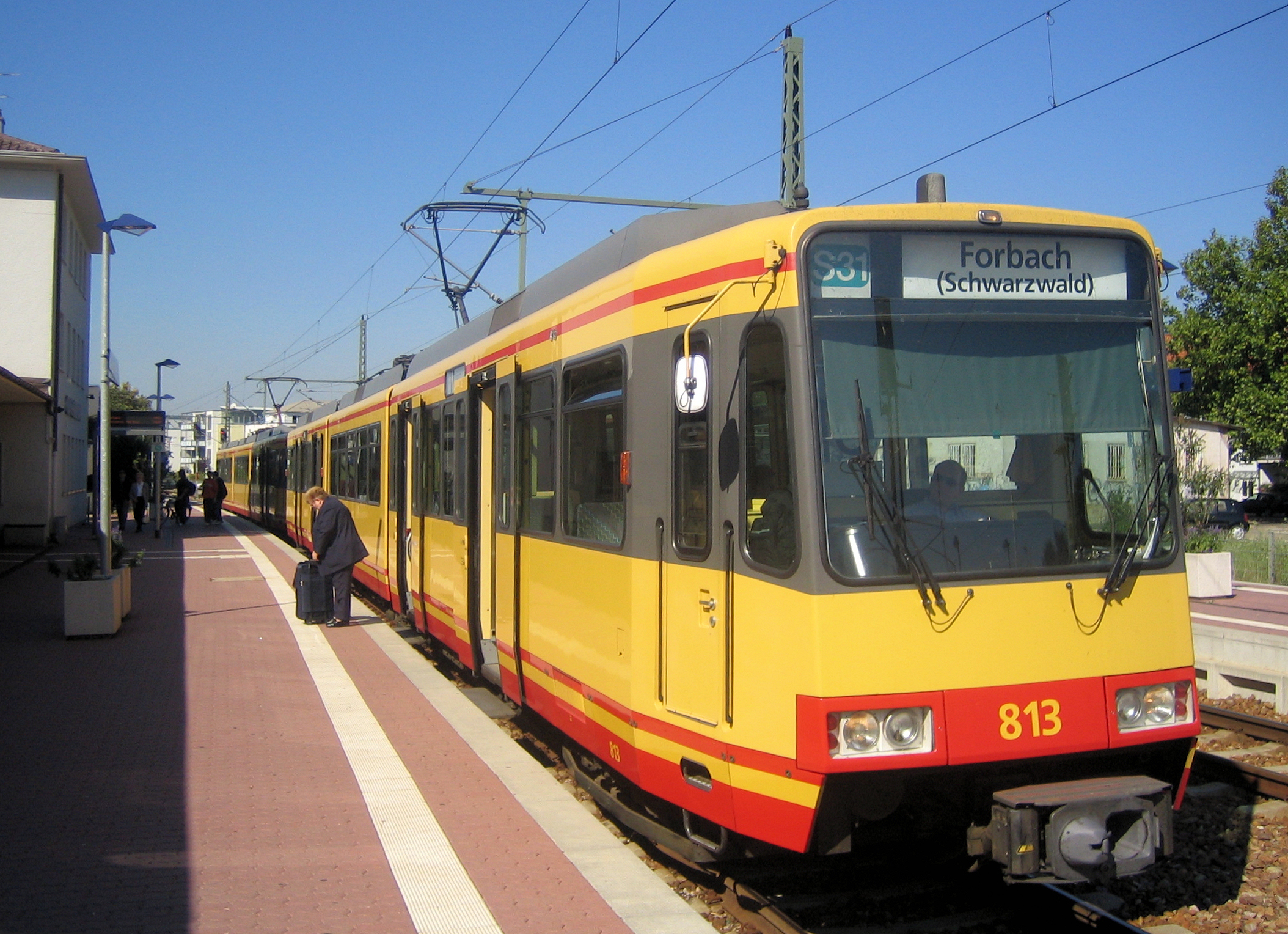
Class GT8-100C/2S Stadtbahn EMU operated by AVG

The Rolling stock on the lower section of the Murg Valley Railway used to be based in Karlsruhe depot. The first steam locomotives were of Baden class V c and V b, which were replaced from 1914 by class VI b and VI c. Use of these locomotives in the Murg Valley ended in 1953 (VI b) or 1961 (VI c) and they were replaced by locomotives of class T18 for the haulage of passenger trains (1959–1966). In freight traffic, class 50 locomotives were used until 1970.

The locomotives for operations on the steep sections in Freudenstadt were located in Freudenstadt depot. Until 1924, only cog locomotives of the Württemberg class Fz were used. After successful tests with locomotives of the Prussian class T 16.1, operations on the steep sections were converted to this class. The rack operation was therefore gradually abandoned until 1926. Six machines of this class were located in Freudenstadt. From 1955, two additional newly built class 82 locomotives were used. Since the towing capacity of the steam locomotives on the steep sections was only 160 tonnes (class T 16.1) or 180 tonnes (class 82), many trains needed an additional engine, that is, trains were pulled by a locomotive at the front and pushed at the rear.

With the delivery of four railbuses of class VT 98.9 (798), capable of climbing steep grades to the Karlsruhe depot in 1956, the era of diesel operations began on the Murg Valley Railway. However, these four sets were not sufficient to operate all services, so some services were still steam-hauled. In 1966 the picture changed on the Murg Valley Railway again, when ten new class V100 (V 100 2332 to 2341, later class 213 332–341) locomotives were delivered to Karlsruhe depot for hauling trains in the Murg valley; these replaced the steam locomotives and railbuses.

The change of locomotives was no longer necessary. However, a single V 100 could carry only haul 150 tonnes on the steep section, so services continuing from Baiersbronn needed two or three locomotives. This only changed with the commissioning of nine of the class 218 (218 160–168) locomotives that had been adapted for steep hauls; these replaced the class V 100 locomotives in 1972. Thanks to a maximum towing capacity of 225 tons, it was possible to almost entirely dispense with additional locomotives on the steep sections.

From the late 1980s some class 628/928 diesel multiple units were used on the lower section as far as Baiersbronn. Since these were not allowed on the steep section, a change was required at Baiersbronn to class 627.0 diesel multiple units, which also operated in the Murg Valley from the 1980s.

With the start of Stadtbahn operations, passenger services were based entirely on Karlsruhe Stadtbahn electric multiple units of class GT8-100D/2S-M operated by Albtal-Verkehrs-Gesellschaft, which were approved for the steep route in Freudenstadt. The EMUs sometimes operate as single sets, sometimes as double sets. Older EMUs of class GT8-100C/2S are also used between Rastatt and Forbach, but they are not approved for the steeper section.
