= Eutingen im Gäu–Schiltach railway line =

Railway line in Germany

Eutingen im Gäu–Schiltach
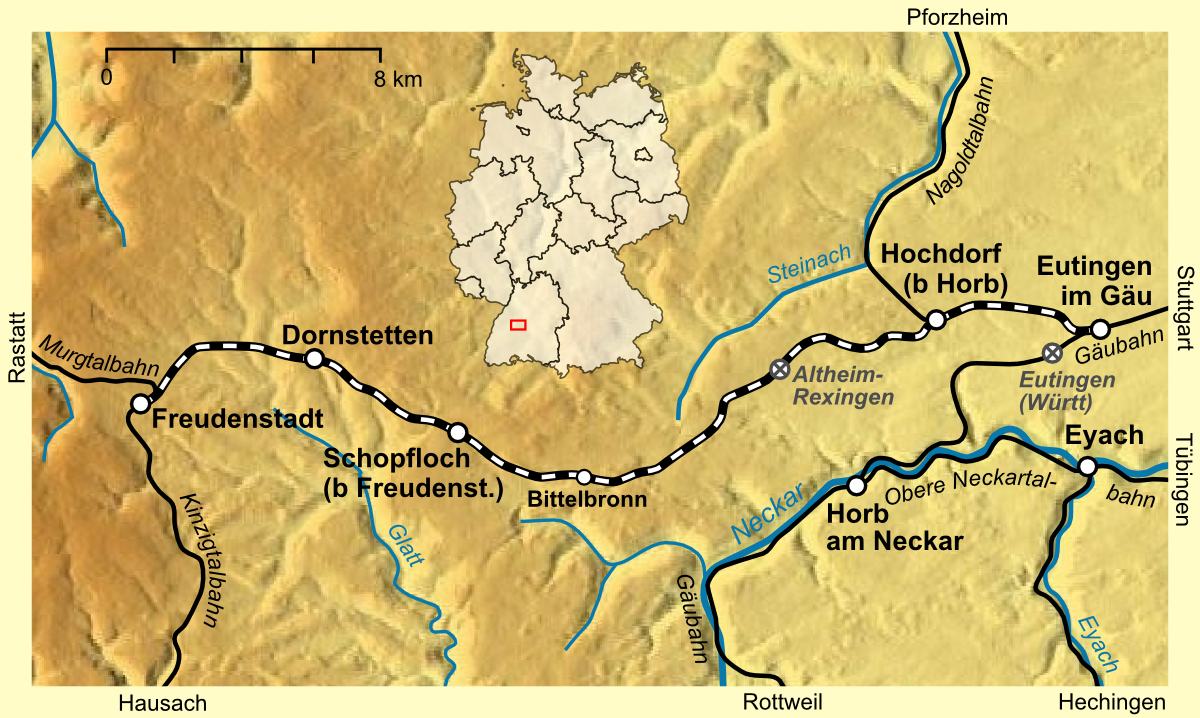

Overview
- Line number: 4880
- Locale: Baden-Württemberg, Germany

Service
- Route number: 741

Technical
- Line length: 54.8 km (34.1 mi)
- Track gauge: 1,435 mm (4 ft 8 1/2 in) standard gauge
- Electrification: 15 kV/16.7 Hz AC overhead catenary (Eutingen im Gäu–Freudenstadt)
- Operating speed: 100 km/h (62.1 mph) (maximum)
- Maximum incline: 0.2%

The Eutingen im Gäu–Schiltach railway line (also called the Gäubahn in German—Gäu Railway) is a railway line in the German state of Baden-Württemberg that runs from the cultural landscape of the Gäu to the eastern edge of the Black Forest, connecting Eutingen and Schiltach via Freudenstadt. It is a section of the Gäu Railway from Stuttgart to Freudenstadt opened on 1 September 1879.

The line was the link from the state capital of Stuttgart to the Kinzig Valley Railway. Both the Gäu Railway and the Kinzig Valley Railway were main lines until 1974. Since the mid-1970s these railways were threatened time and again with closure. Not until 2006 was comprehensive electrification and renovation work carried out as part of the development of the Freudenstädter Stern regional network. Finally the line was integrated into the Karlsruhe Stadtbahn network and once again after a decade a direct link to Stuttgart was introduced.

The Gäu Railway was planned by railway engineer, Georg Morlok, and was characterised by viaducts and deep rock cuttings that were an architectural challenge to build.

== Route ==
=== Gäubahn ===
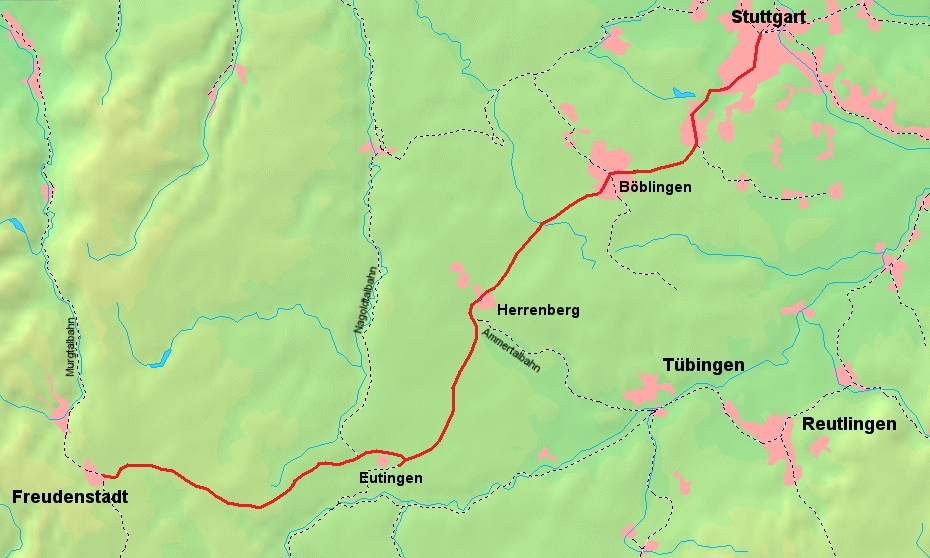
Course of the Gäubahn between Stuttgart and Freudenstadt

The line forms part of the Gäu Railway (Gäubahn), which was originally a name for the Stuttgart–Freudenstadt railway that had opened in 1879 and runs through Herrenberg and Eutingen through the cultural landscape of the Gäu.

However, from the 1930s, the term was extended to the nearby Eutingen–Horb line which had formerly been regarded as part of the Nagold Valley Railway. From the 1950s, the term began to be used for the line from Horb to Singen. The Horb–Immendingen line together with the Stuttgart–Horb railway, therefore, is now also called the Gäubahn.

=== Course ===
The Eutingen–Freudenstadt railway branches off the Stuttgart–Singen railway in Eutingen to run in a westerly direction through the wide Gäu plateau and to connect with the Nagold Valley Railway at Nagold-Hochdorf. The line runs to the south-west through the Horbe district, passing through some low forests and glades to Bittelbronn. Continuing northwest, the line passes the edge of the village of Schopfloch. From there, the line begins to be spectacular. Mighty rock cuttings and exposed rock formations characterise the line from this point. Shortly before Dornstetten there is a wide, unobstructed view of the foothills of the Black Forest. Running mainly west, the line crosses three large viaducts over the valleys near Dornstetten-Aach, Freudenstadt-Grüntal and Freudenstadt-Wittlensweiler to Freudenstädt Hauptbahnhof, which is in the southern part of the town.

From Freudenstadt, the line follows the Kinzig River to Schiltach and a junction with the Kinzig Valley Railway. The section of the line has numerous tunnels, and unlike the portion between Eutingen im Gäu and Freudenstadt, is not electrified.

== History ==
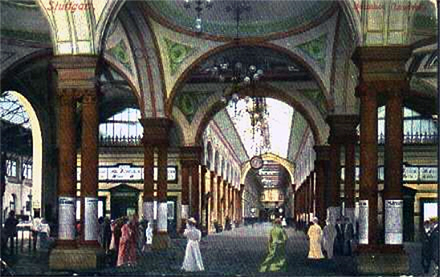
Stuttgart central station, starting point of the Stuttgart–Freudenstadt railway (Gäubahn) opened in 1872

A government bill dated 28 April 1865 already mentioned a Gäu-Bahn (Stuttgart–Freudenstadt) as a railway line to be built. It would connect the Württemberg capital of Stuttgart with the Black Forest and future railway lines in the Murg and Kinzig valleys. Any problems due to a 1.56 km long section through Hohenzollern territory between Bittelbronn and Schopfloch had been resolved by a provision covering this possibility in a treaty between Württemberg and Prussia agreed on 13 March 1865.

The Economic Committee of the Second Chamber stated, that "Württemberg [with the Gäubahn] is preparing to join the ranks of our competitors [especially Baden] on the route to the St. Gotthard." Moreover, the Gäu Railway would result in an almost straight route which cuts through the kingdom from one end (Freudenstadt) to the other (the border at Crailsheim). The Chamber agreed at its 116th and 117th sessions to the building of the railway.

The government entrusted the management of the construction of the Gäu Railway to the Württemberg architect and railway engineer Georg von Morlok. Morlok himself described the necessary large-scale cuttings through the wet rock formations at Schopfloch and the construction of the Ettenbach Viaduct at Wittlensweiler as particularly difficult. Some expert opinion considered it "almost impossible".

Nevertheless, the Royal Württemberg State Railways (Königlich Württembergische Staats-Eisenbahnen) were able to open the approximately 88 km-long Gäu Railway from Stuttgart via Herrenberg and Eutingen to Freudenstadt on 1 September 1879 in one piece. A Gäu Railway opening march was composed especially for the inauguration. The new line connected to the Kinzig Valley Railway in Freudenstadt and to the Nagold Valley Railway in Eutingen. Thus, the new line provided an alternative between Stuttgart and Freudenstadt to the Württemberg Black Forest Railway. But over time, the new shorter line via Böblingen won the competition despite significant gradients.

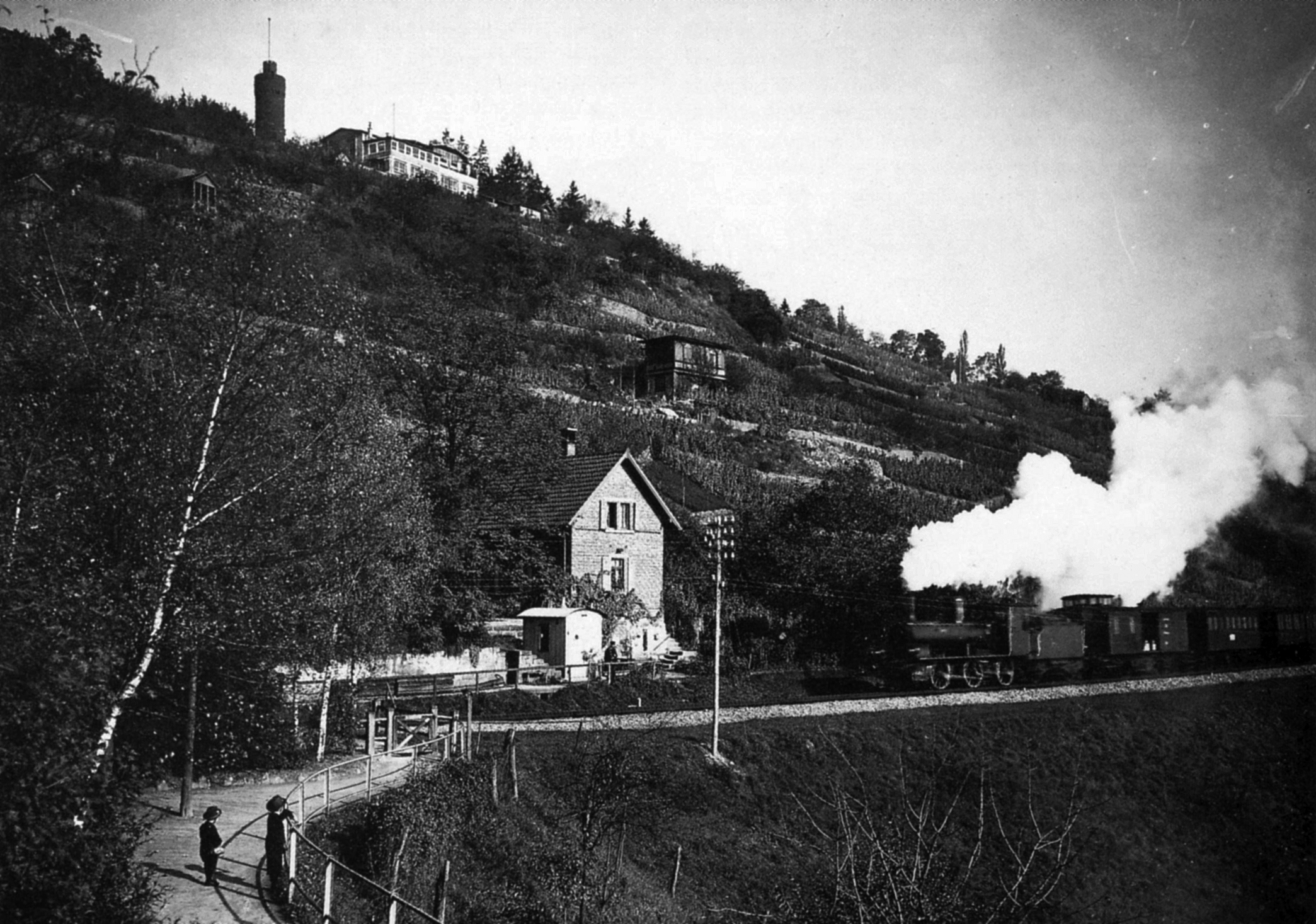
Württemberg F class locomotive at the Gäu Railway halt of Stuttgart-Heslach (before 1900)

=== Development until the Second World War (1879–1945) ===
Since the line of the Gäu Railway (Stuttgart–Freudenstadt) was connected to the Eutingen station on the Nagold Valley Railway, the trains from Stuttgart to Freudenstadt had to reverse in Eutingen station. Initially, there were only three scheduled trains per day on the lines, and the signals and points were set by hand. However, it quickly became apparent that this was causing problems with increasing traffic and raised safety standards. So a signal box at Freudenstadt Hauptbahnhof was completed in 1891.

Around 1900, Freudenstadt was the destination of a Baden train from Frankfurt and Wiesbaden via Karlsruhe, Pforzheim and Hochdorf.

At the end of the 1920s, construction began on a branch line to the Gäu Railway, which would run from Dornstetten via Dornstetten-Hallwangen to Pfalzgrafenweiler. The project was never completed for financial reasons. The remodeled railway embankment is a reminder of this event.

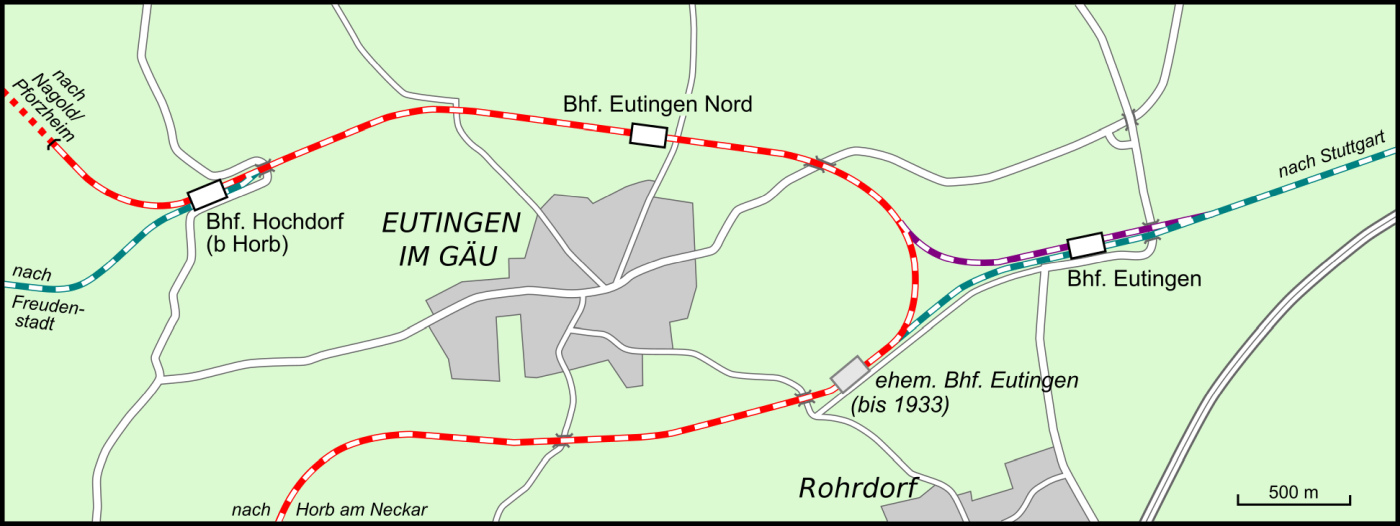
Location of the old and new Eutingen stations

In 1933, Eutingen station was moved to its current location. At the same time, a connecting curve was built so that the trains on the Stuttgart–Freudenstadt route no longer needed to reverse in the station. Double-track operations also began at that time between Eutingen and Hochdorf. Previously, one track had been used by the Nagold Valley Railway and one track by the Gäu Railway.

A few days before the end of the Second World War and four hours before French troops invaded Freudenstadt, the Wehrmacht blew up the three timber viaducts of the Gäubahn. Rail services were closed for several years.

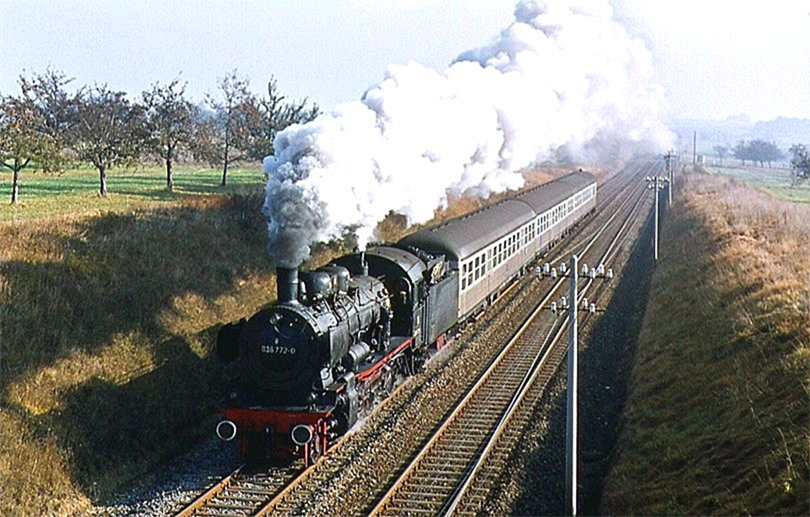
Steam operations on the two-track section between Eutingen and Hochdorf in 1973

=== Recommissioning and imminent decommissioning (1945–1990) ===
Services did note resume until 1 September 1949, when the last viaduct was repaired. Also the so-called Franzosenzug (French train) ran on the somewhat unusual Offenburg–Hausach–Freudenstadt–Horb–Tübingen route from September 1949. It got its name because it mainly served French military traffic.

Following the takeover of the Gäu Railway by the Deutsche Bundesbahn, an electro-mechanical interlocking was built in Freudenstadt. This was followed by a period of prosperity for tourism in the Black Forest, benefiting Freudenstadt in particular. In 1954, the Hochdorf guard signal box on the line towards Eutingen was closed and a central dispatcher's signal box was built. This was accompanied by a simplification of the track layout.

The popularity of long-haul destinations and the shift of traffic to road transport, among other things, led to a sharp decline in passenger numbers in the 1960s. Closure of the line was considered towards the end of the decade. However, this was averted by concerted action by local politicians and interest groups as well as support from federal politicians. However, for a long time hardly any investments were made in rolling stock and infrastructure. In 1974, the line was downgraded from a main line to a branch line and, a year later, the halt of Freudenstadt-Grüntal was closed.

The second track between Eutingen and Hochdorf was dismantled in 1985. The remaining track has since been used by trains on both the Gäu Railway and the Nagold Valley Railway. The loading of freight in Hochdorf was discontinued in 1988. Eutingen station was renamed from Eutingen (Württ) to Eutingen im Gäu in 1988.

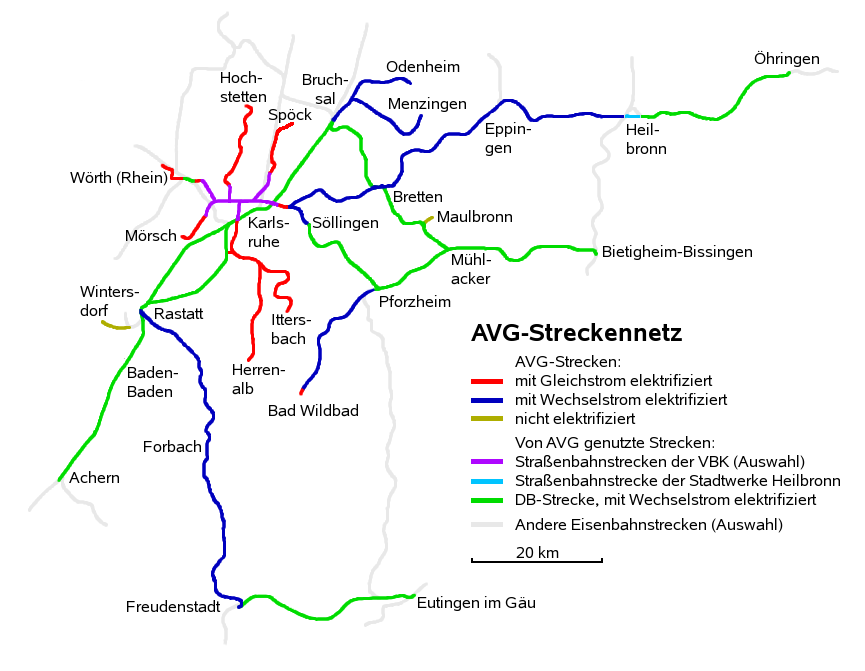
Karlsruhe Stadtbahn network

=== Development in the "Freudenstadt Star" (since 1990) ===
In the mid-1990s, plans were made for a regional network called the Freudenstädter Stern (Freudenstadt Star). These provided for cost reductions through the greatest possible rationalisation of personnel and infrastructure, the introduction of an integraled timetable and services at least every hour.

Significant steps towards the completion of the Freudenstadt Star were made with the electrification of the Murg Valley Railway in the course of the extension of lines S 31 (S 81 since 2016) and S 41 (now S 8) of the Karlsruhe Stadtbahn to Freudenstadt 2003, the takeover of the operations on the Kinzig Valley Railway by the Ortenau-S-Bahn (OSB) in 2005 and the construction of a computer-based interlocking at Freudenstadt Hauptbahnhof.

One of the last projects of the regional network was the electrification of the Gäu Railway in 2006 as well as the construction and reconstruction of the crossing stations at Schopfloch and Hochdorf. This allowed the line to be integrated into the Karlsruhe Stadtbahn, then as line S 41. The change was accompanied by a sharp increase in passenger numbers. In 2005, only about 500 passengers per day used services on the Gäu Railway, compared to 1,300 in 2007 and 1,400 in 2008.

In order to improve the connection of the population of the eastern Freudenstadt district to the railway on the model of the Murg Valley Railway, new stations are planned in Freudenstadt-Grüntal, Dornstetten-Aach, Dornstetten Mitte (as a replacement for the old station), Horb-Heiligenfeld and Eutingen im Gäu Nord. Of these, the first station, Horb-Heiligenfeld, was finally opened in December 2012 in the industrial area of the same name. A year later, in December 2013, this was followed by the reactivation of the former halt of Freundenstadt-Grüntal under the new name of Grüntal/Wittlensweiler. Furthermore, the halt of Bittelbronn was made barrier-free. The two new halts in Dornstetten are currently going through the planning approval process after a significant delay at local level.

== Structural features ==
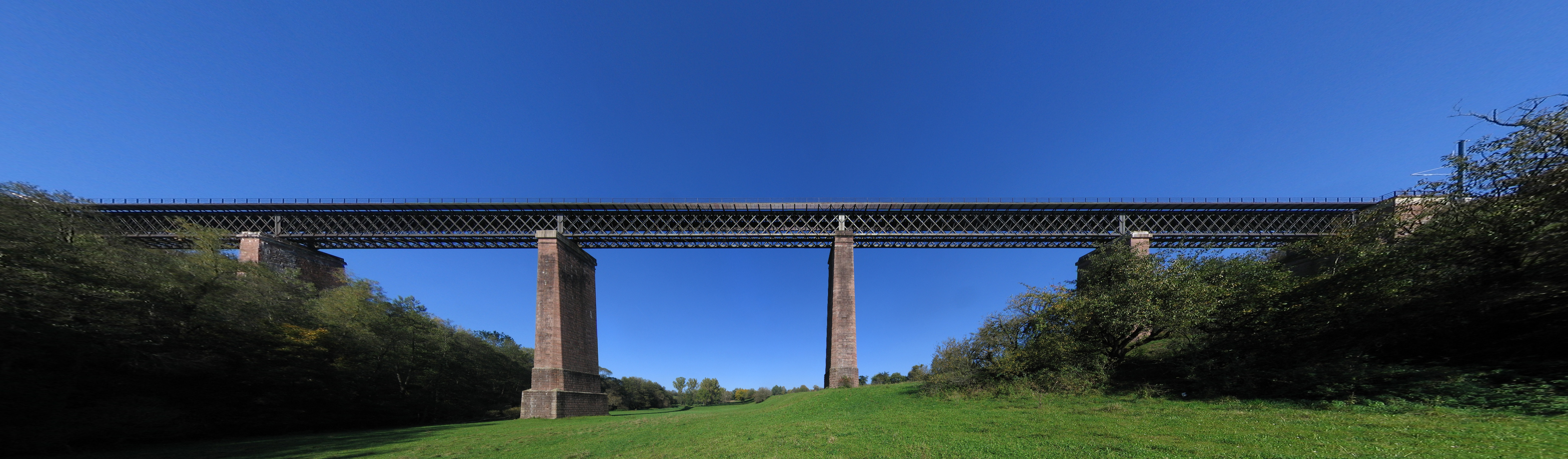
The Kübelbach Viaduct near Dornstetten-Aach before electrification

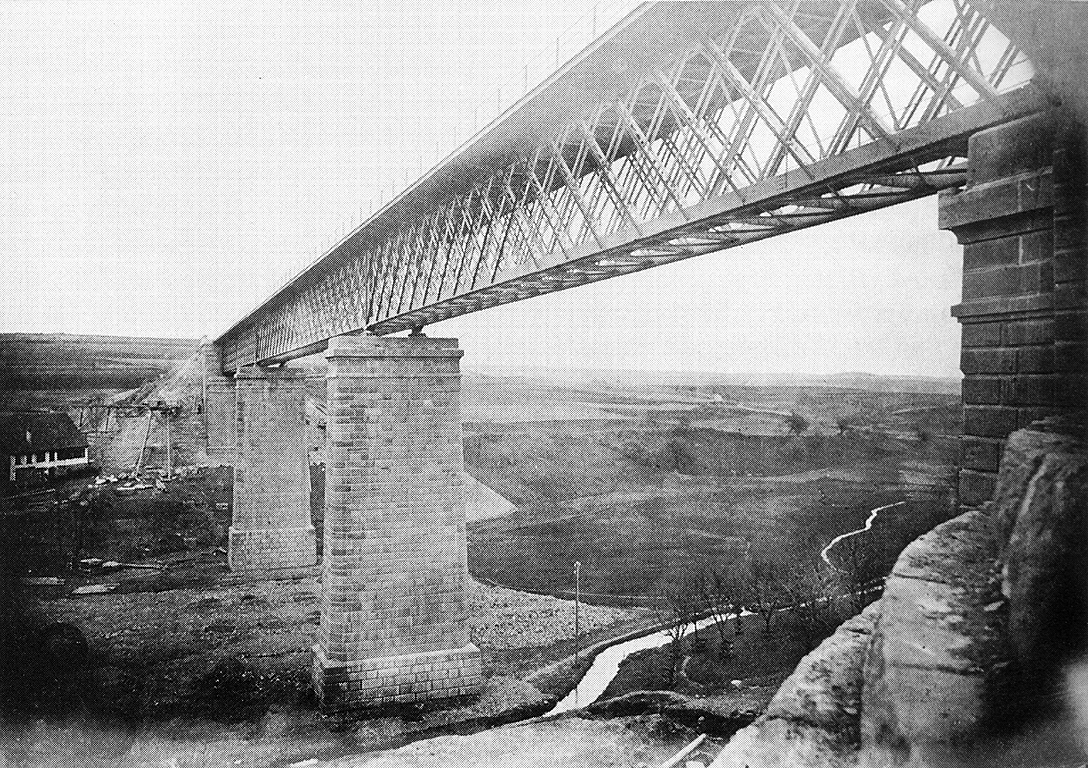
The Ettenbach viaduct after its completion in 1878

The biggest challenge in the construction of the Gäu Railway was crossing the valleys at Aach, Grüntal and Wittlensweiler. This required the construction of three elaborate timbered viaducts:

- The Kübelbach Viaduct runs near Aach (now a district of Dornstetten) over the valley of the Kübelbach and federal highway 28. It was constructed between 1875 and 1879. The bridge is 279 metres long, has five openings, has four central pillars and is about 45 metres high.
- The Stockerbach Viaduct was formerly identical to the Kübelbach viaduct, but was restored after its destruction in a more modern design. It crosses the Grün valley at Stockerbach. Its length is also 279 metres and its height is about 43 metres. It was built at the same time as the Kübelbach viaduct.
- As the smallest of the three railway bridges of the Gäubahn near Freudenstadt, the Ettenbach Viaduct, built in 1877–1878, crosses the Ettenbach in Wittlensweiler, now a district of Freudenstadt. It has a length of 171 metres and its height is 25 metres.

Large quantities of stone from quarries in the region were used for its construction. The iron structures were transported from Horb-Neckarhausen.

== Operations ==
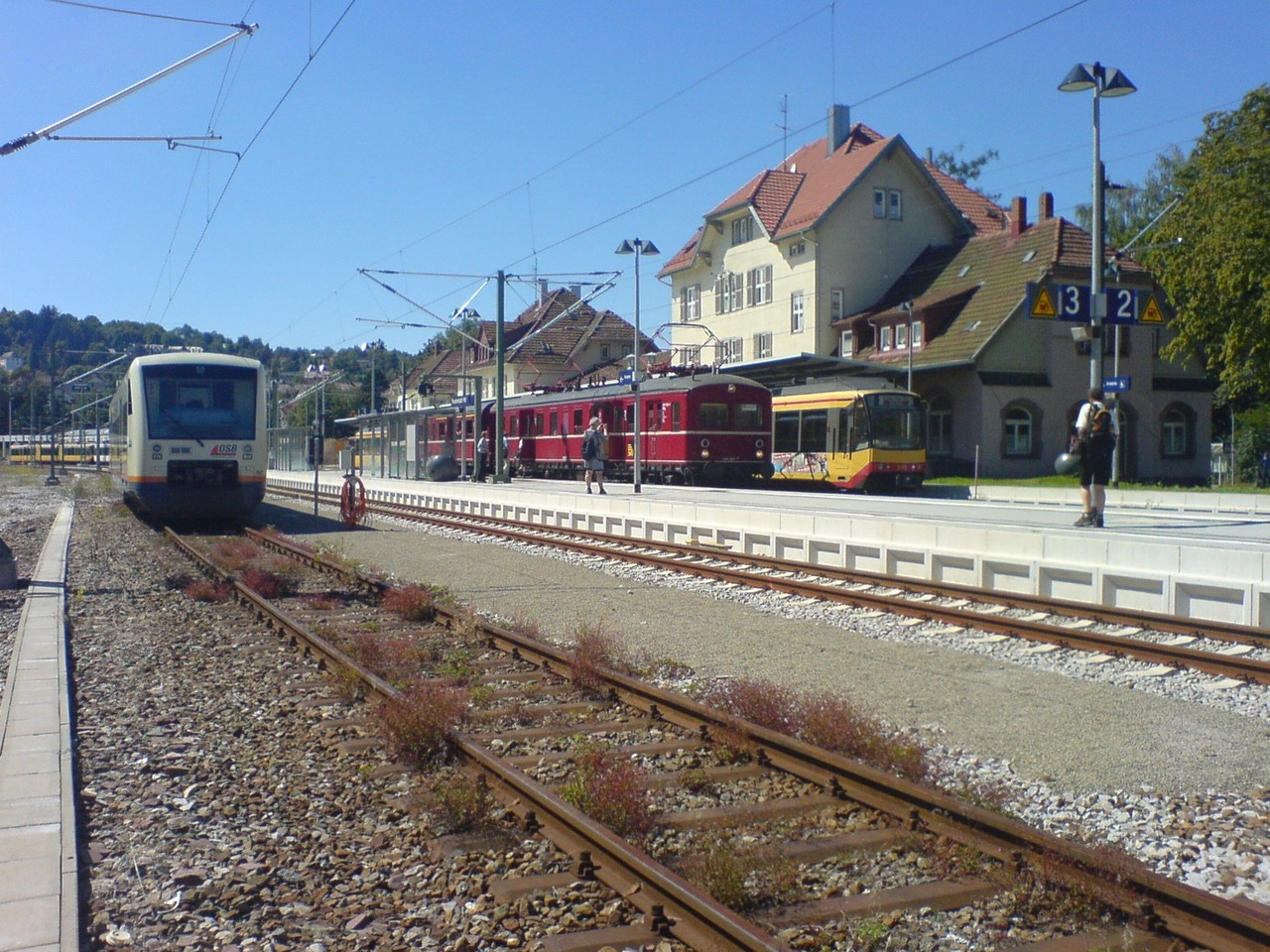
Freudenstadt Hauptbahnhof

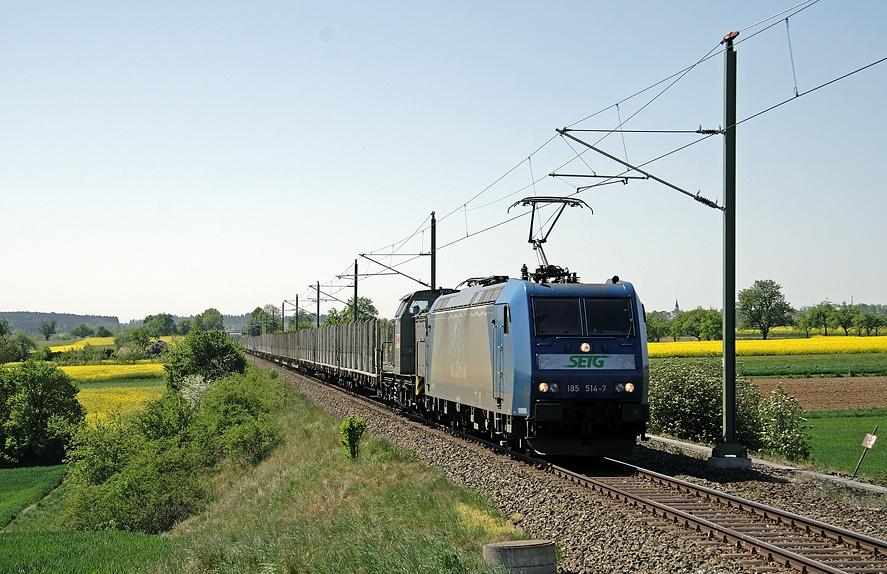
Empty timber train from Horb-Heiligenfeld on the Gäu Railway

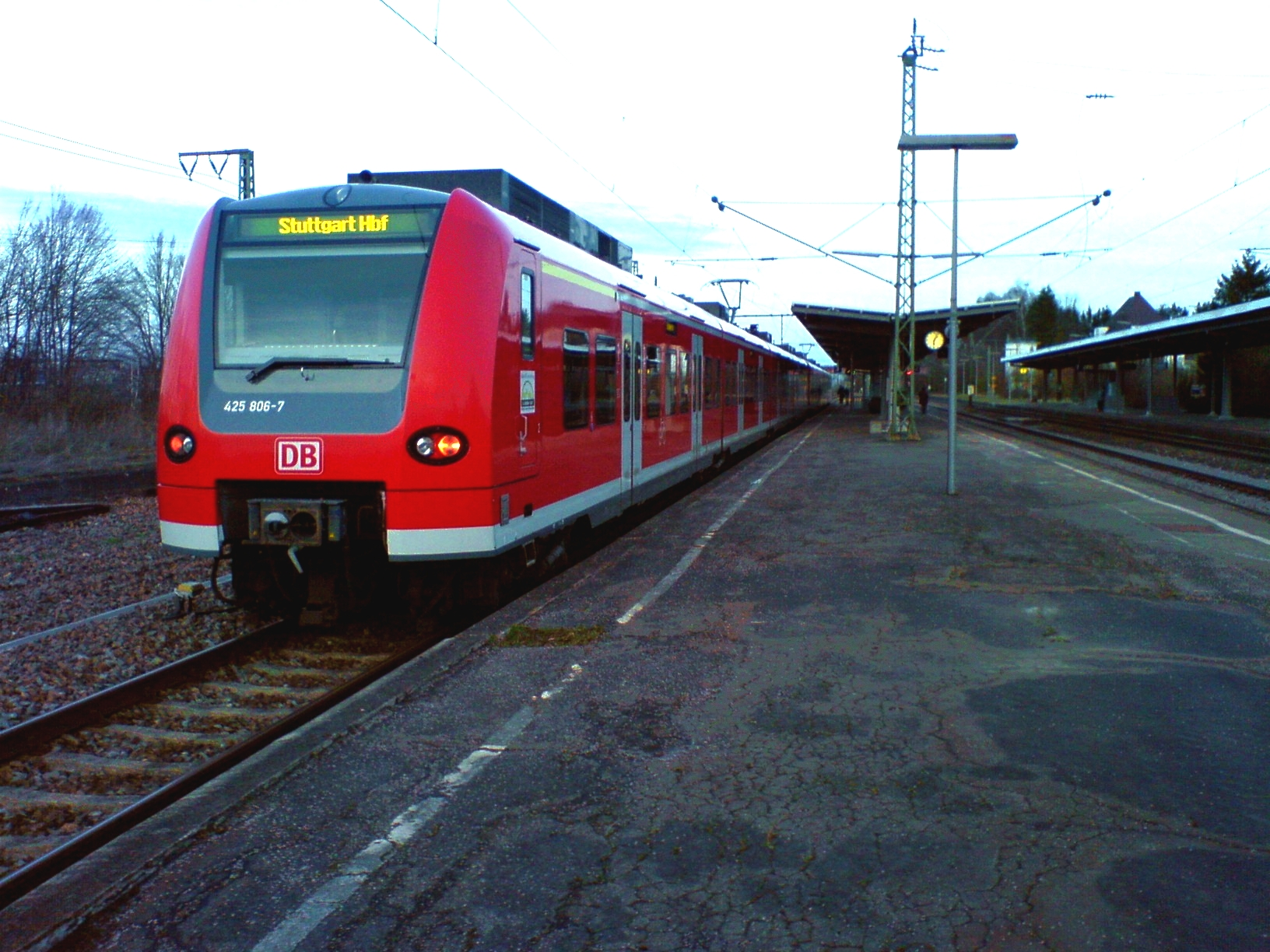
Freudenstadt–Stuttgart Regional-Express in Eutingen

The route is operated by Deutsche Bahn. Every two hours a Regionalexpress (RE) operates from Freudenstadt to Stuttgart. On the hour between these services, the Albtal-Verkehrs-Gesellschaft (AVG) has extended Stadtbahn lines S 8 and S 81 (Karlsruhe–Freudenstadt) to run to Eutingen on behalf of Deutsche Bahn. As a result, Karlsruhe can also be reached from Eutingen without having to change trains. In Eutingen there is a connection between the Stadtbahn and the Stuttgart–Singen RE service. The S 8 also runs to Herrenberg in the evening, as a feeder to line S 1 of the Stuttgart S-Bahn.

In Hochdorf there is a connection to the Pforzheim–Horb–Tübingen Regionalbahn (RB) service, in Freudenstadt to Ortenau S-Bahn services to Offenburg and Stadtbahn lines S 8 and S 81 services to Karlsruhe Kronenplatz and Karlsruhe Hauptbahnhof.

In 2007, the AVG established an operations shed for passenger and freight rolling stock at Freudenstadt Hauptbahnhof. In total, six of its own vehicles and two Deutsche Bahn railcars have a covered stabling area.

Freight traffic plays a decreasing role on the Gäu Railway. The only dedicated tracks for freight traffic are in the Horb-Heiligenfeld industrial area. The last major transport of timber was carried out after the storm damage of the Lothar and Kyrill cyclones. A problem with freight transport in particular is the congestion of the Gäu Railway on the short section between Eutingen and Hochdorf, which is used by the Nagold Valley Railway.

Occasionally services hauled by historic steam locomotives also operate on the Gäu Railway.

=== Rolling stock ===
- The Stuttgart–Freudenstadt RE service is operated with Bombardier Talent 2 (class 442) electric multiple units.
- Services between Eutingen im Gäu and Freudenstadt are operated hourly with Stadtbahn sets of the GT8-100D/2S-M class.
- In the evening individual Stadtbahn sets are operated on the S 8 service to Herrenberg.
- Stadler Regio-Shuttle RS1 diesel railcars of DB ZugBus Regionalverkehr Alb-Bodensee (RAB, a subsidiary of DB Regio) are operated on the track section shared with the Nagold Valley Railway.

=== Fares ===
In addition to the fares of Deutsche Bahn, tickets of the Verkehrs-Gemeinschaft Landkreis Freudenstadt (vgf) are valid on the entire Gäu Railway. In addition, the RegioX ticket of the Karlsruher Verkehrsverbund (KVV) can be used on the line.

== See also ==
- History of the railway in Württemberg with mapping on the construction of the Gäu Railway in comparison with the growth of the whole Württemberg railway network.
