= Eutingen im Gäu station =

Railway station in Eutingen im Gäu, Germany

Eutingen im Gäu
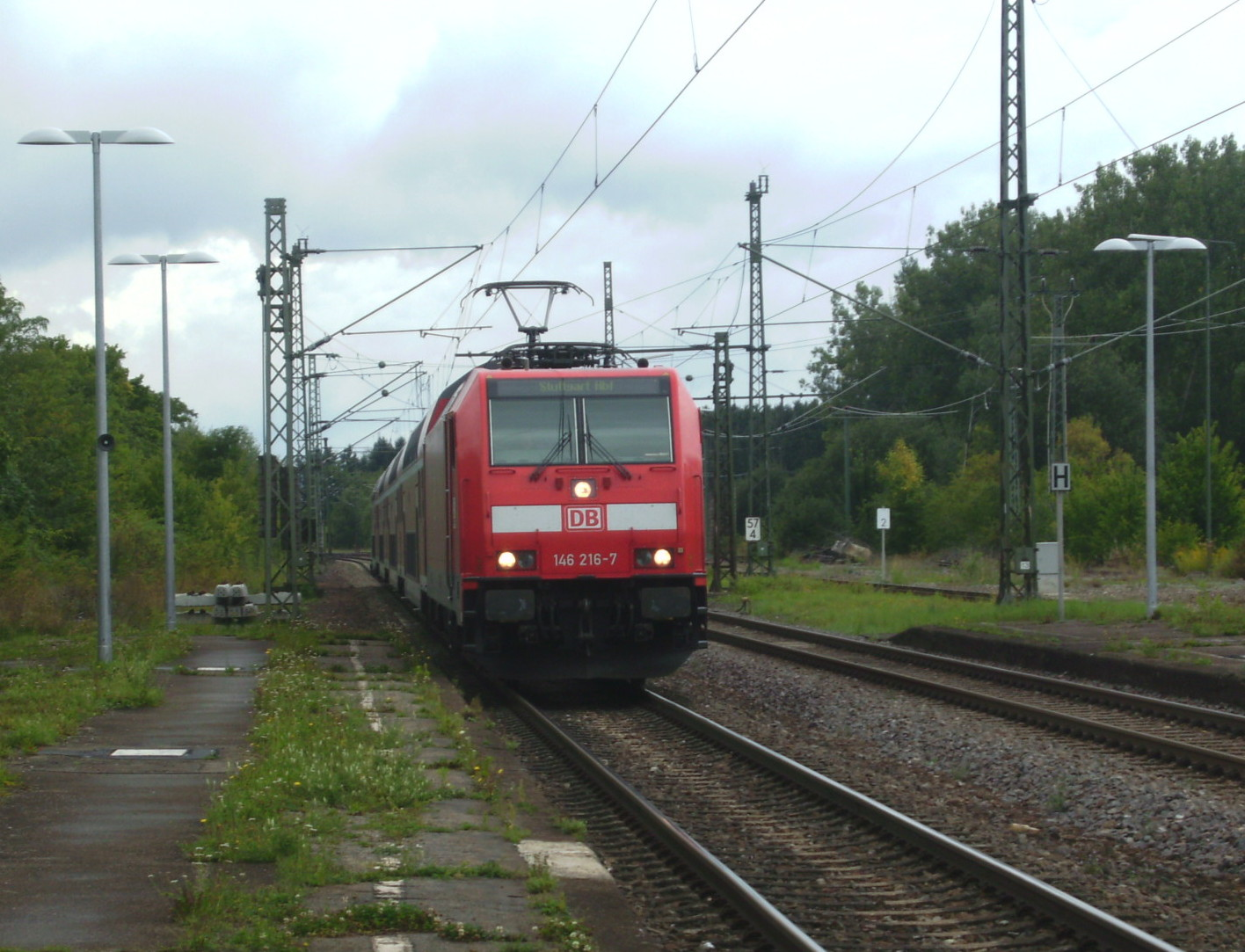
- Regional-Express on the way to Stuttgart Hbf in Eutinger station

General information
- Location: Neuer Bahnhof 1, Eutingen im Gäu, Baden-Württemberg; Germany
- Coordinates: 48°28′47″N 8°46′58″E
- Owner: Deutsche Bahn
- Operator: DB Netz; DB Station&Service
- Lines: Eutingen–Freudenstadt (km 0.0) (KBS 741); Plochingen–Immendingen (km 57.2) (KBS 740)
- Platforms: 3
- Connections: S 8; 7400 7418 7628 7633

Construction
- Accessible: Yes

Other information
- Station code: 1738
- DS100 code: TET
- IBNR: 8000073
- Category: 4
- Fare zone: VGF: 41
- Website: www.bahnhof.de

History
- Opened: 1 June 1874 (old station); 8 October 1933 (current station)
- Former names: Eutingen (Württ)

Services
Preceding station	DB Regio Baden-Württemberg	Following station
Horb towards Rottweil	RE 14a	Ergenzingen towards Stuttgart Hbf
Eutingen Nord towards Freudenstadt Hbf	RE 14b	Ergenzingen towards Stuttgart Hbf
Location

Eutingen im Gäu station is located in the town of Eutingen im Gäu in the German state of Baden-Württemberg. It is at the junction of the Plochingen–Immendingen railway, connecting Stuttgart and Singen, and the Eutingen im Gäu–Schiltach railway, connecting Eutingen and Freudenstadt.

== Location ==
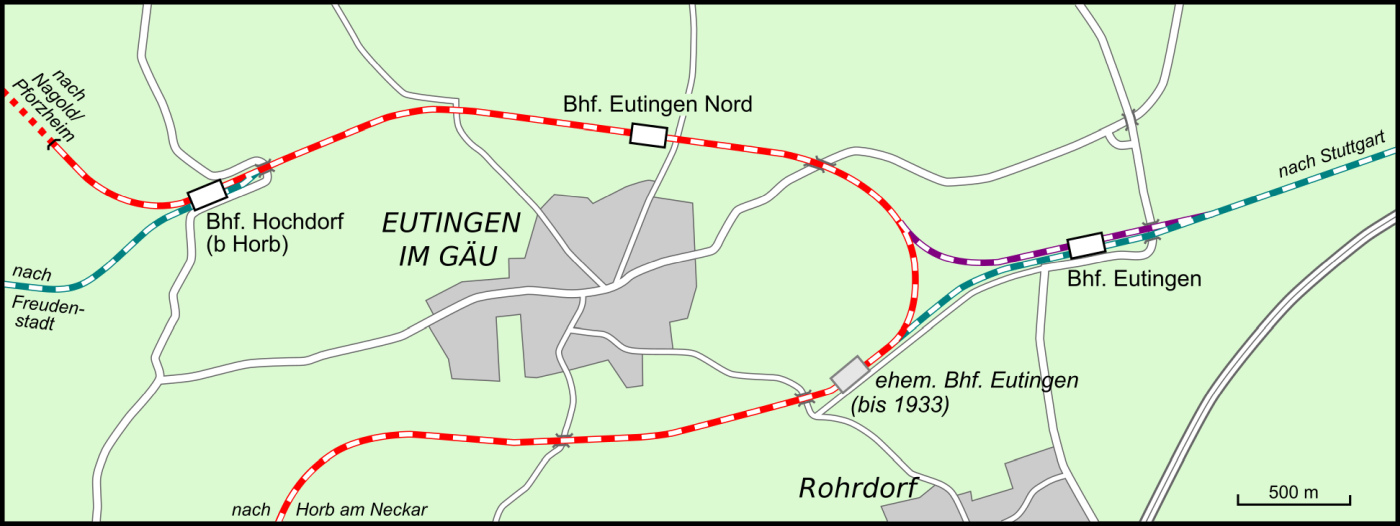
Location of the old and the new station

Eutingen im Gäu station is located on the plateau about 3 km to the east of central Eutingen in the district of Rohrdorf on the Stuttgart–Hattingen railway (also known as the Gäubahn or Gau Railway) and it is the starting point historically of the Eutingen im Gäu–Freudenstadt railway.

== History ==
=== First station (1874–1933) ===
The first station in Eutingen was opened on 1 June 1874 with the commissioning of the Nagold Valley Railway (Nagoldtalbahn). It lay to the southeast of the village. The Stuttgart–Hattingen railway was connected to the north of the station in 1879. The station then consisted of a temporary administration building, a goods shed, a locomotive shed and staff accommodation.

The station was in operation until 1933 and eventually included a "house" platform next to the station building, three island platforms, a turntable, a three-road roundhouse and extensive facilities for freight.

=== Second station of 1933 ===
The Free People's State of Württemberg and the Deutsche Reichsbahn signed a contract in February 1927 for the improvement of the rail link between Stuttgart via Horb and Tuttlingen to Singen. This involved the doubling of the line and a complete reconstruction of Eutingen station.

An entirely new station was built to the east of the existing station on the line towards Ergenzingen. The track layout was designed so that both the trains from Stuttgart to Freudenstadt as well as the trains from Stuttgart to Horb could operate without having to reverse in the station. The local goods yard remained at the old location. A connecting curve was built from the new station to the Nagold Valley Railway, which was opened together with the station on 8 October 1933. Since then trains on the Nagold Valley Railway have operated to Horb or Tübingen, not to Eutingen.

Electrification of the line from Böblingen to Horb, including Eutingen station, was completed on 29 September 1974.

Steam operation ended at the station in 1974 here and the turntable and the roundhouse were demolished in 1975. The local freight yard at the old station was also closed.

The second track towards Hochdorf was closed in 1983 and later dismantled.

The station was renamed from Eutingen (Württ) to Eutingen im Gäu on 29 May 1988.

The line to Freudenstadt was electrified in 2006.

The main building was renovated from January 2015. The new private owners valued its originality, so the wood shingle facade was restored and it has been painted in its original colour.

In the autumn of 2015, the station gradually attracted refugees, mostly from Syria. In January 2016, 63 people inhabited the building. In addition, Deutsche Bahn has continued to rent large parts of the ground floor to maintain its technical equipment in operation.

== Station infrastructure ==
The station had eight platform tracks in operation in 1933, but only three are now available. The station building of 1933 still stands, but with a length of 40 metres, a width of 12.6 metres and a height of 16 metres, it is larger than required. With the abandonment of much of its infrastructure, the station has a large amount of unused land.

== Operations ==
Regional-Express (RE) services on the Stuttgart–Horb–Rottweil–Singen route stop in Eutingen every hour and Regional-Express services on the Stuttgart–Freudenstadt stop every two hours. Since 2006, Karlsruhe Stadtbahn line S41 (now S8 and S81) has also run every two hour from Eutingen via Freudenstadt, Forbach (Schwarzwald) and Rastatt to central Karlsruhe, so the RE and Stadtbahn services provide an hourly service between Eutingen im Gäu and Freudenstadt.

Line	Route	Frequency
IC 87 / RE 87	Stuttgart – Böblingen – Eutingen im Gäu – Horb – Rottweil – Tuttlingen – Singen	Some trains in the morning
RE 14a	Stuttgart – Böblingen – Herrenberg – Eutingen im Gäu – Horb – Rottweil	Every 2 hours
RE 14b	Stuttgart – Böblingen – Herrenberg – Eutingen im Gäu – Freudenstadt	Every 2 hours
RB 14A	Stuttgart – Böblingen – Herrenberg – Eutingen im Gäu – Horb (– Rottweil – Schwenningen – Villingen)	Some trains
S 8	Karlsruhe Tullastraße/VBK – Karlsruhe Hbf (Vorplatz) – Durmersheim – Rastatt – Forbach – Freudenstadt – Eutingen im Gäu	At least every 2 hours
S 81	Karlsruhe Hbf – Malsch – Rastatt – Forbach – Freudenstadt – Eutingen im Gäu – Bondorf	Some trains in the morning Mon–Fri

(as of 2025)

The Intercity trains between Stuttgart and Zurich and freight trains pass through the station without stopping.
