= Schiltach-Schramberg railway line =

Former railway line in Germany

Schiltach–Schramberg
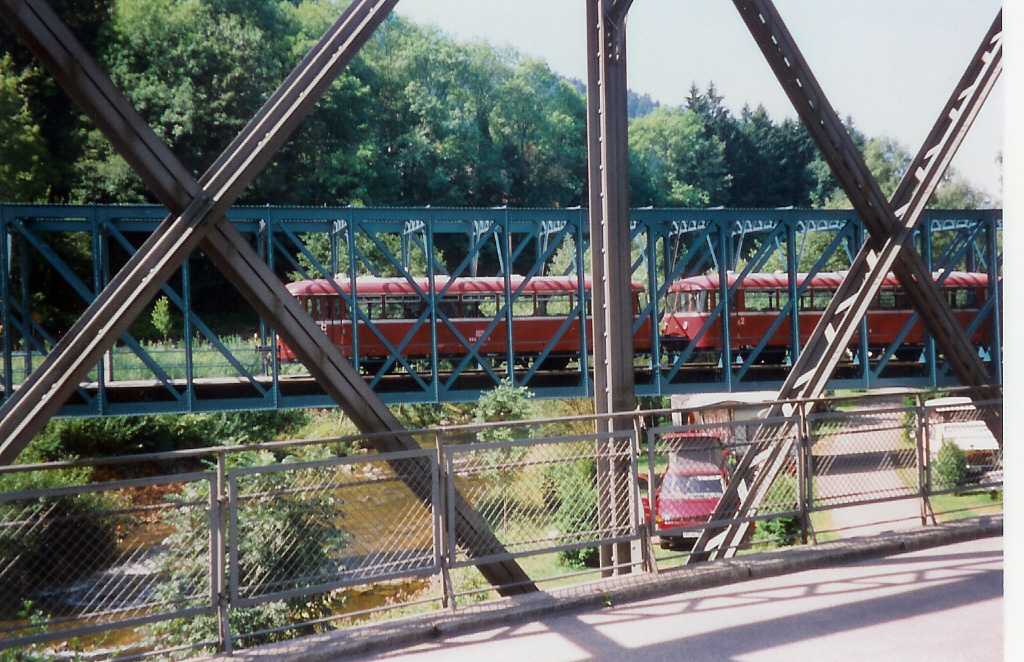
- VT 98 on the bridge over the Kinzig in 1988

Overview
- Line number: 4252

Technical
- Line length: 8.8 km (5.5 mi)
- Track gauge: 1,435 mm (4 ft 8 1/2 in) standard gauge

The Schiltach–Schramberg railway line was a railway line in Germany. At one time, the line branched off at Schiltach from the Kinzig Valley Railway (Black Forest). The line connected the City of Schramberg to the international railway system.

This line was opened in 1892, but closed to passenger service in 1959 and ceased operations completely in 1990. At Schiltach station a Uerdingen railbus rake and the old railway bridge over the Kinzig recalls this branch that, today, has been dismantled at 95%. The line was 8.8 kilometres (5 mi) long.

The line is now used as a bicycle path.
