= Freudenstadt Hauptbahnhof =

Station in Freudenstadt, Baden-Württemberg, Germany

Freudenstadt Hbf
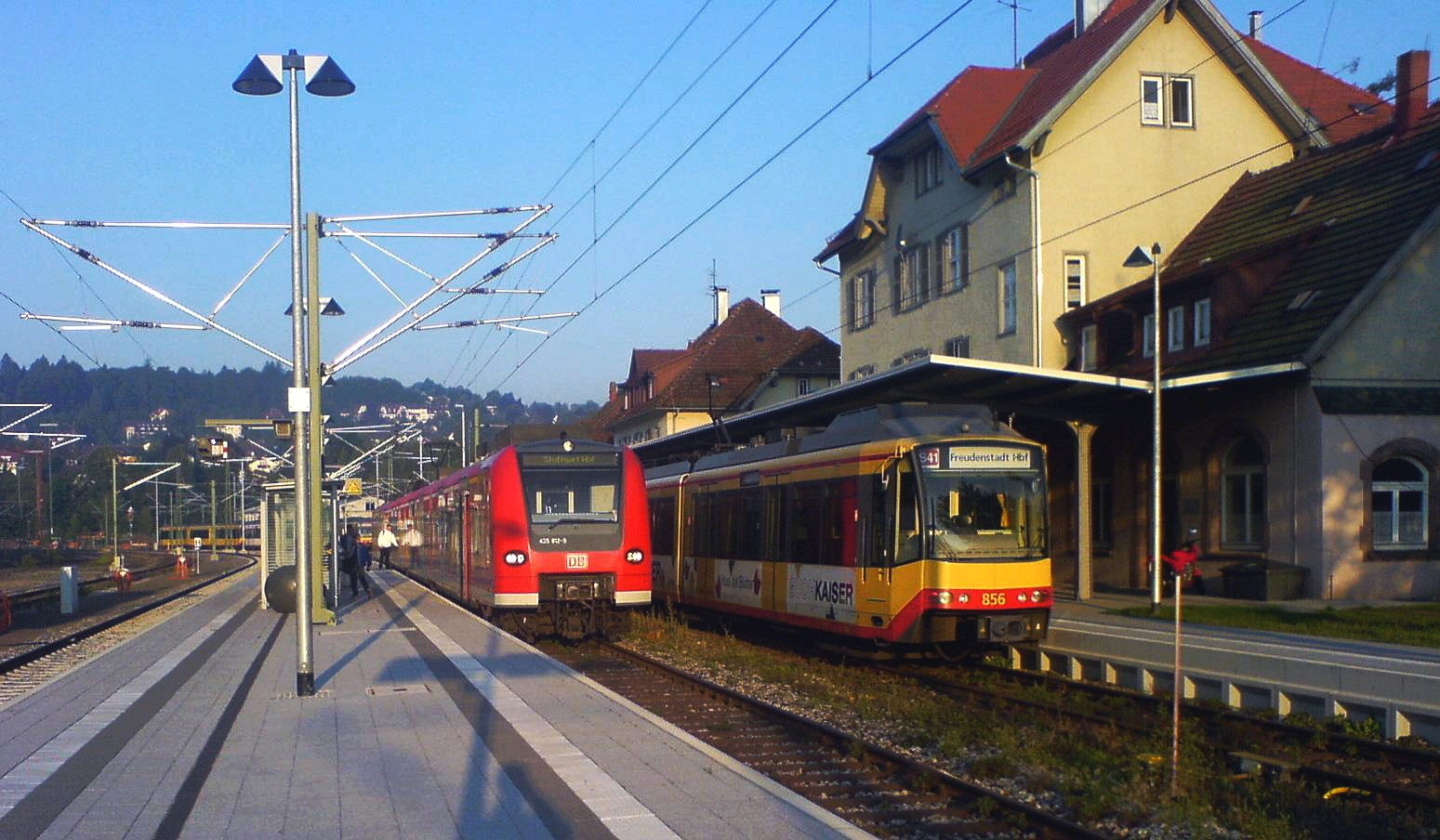
- The station with DB and Karlsruhe Stadtbahn trains

General information
- Location: Freudenstadt, Baden-Württemberg; Germany
- Coordinates: 48°27′38″N 8°25′43″E
- Lines: Gaübahn (KBS 741); Murg Valley Railway (KBS 710.8)
- Platforms: 3
- Train operators: DB Regio Baden-Württemberg; Karlsruhe Stadtbahn; Ortenau S-Bahn
- Connections: S 8 S 81

Construction
- Accessible: Yes

Other information
- Station code: 1921
- DS100 code: TFS
- IBNR: 8000110
- Category: 5
- Fare zone: VGF: 10
- Website: www.bahnhof.de

History
- Opened: 1879

Services
Preceding station	DB Regio Baden-Württemberg	Following station
Terminus	RE 14b	Grüntal-Wittlensweiler towards Stuttgart Hbf
Preceding station	DB Regio Mitte	Following station
Freudenstadt Industriegebiet towards Karlsruhe Hbf	RE 40	Terminus
Freudenstadt Industriegebiet towards Karlsruhe Hbf	RB 41	Grüntal-Wittlensweiler towards Frankfurt (Main) Hbf
Preceding station	(Offenburg)	Following station
Loßburg-Rodt towards Offenburg	RS 1	Terminus
Preceding station	Karlsruhe Stadtbahn	Following station
Freudenstadt Stadt towards Karlsruhe Tullastraße	S 8	Dornstetten towards Eutingen im Gäu
Freudenstadt Stadt towards Karlsruhe Hbf	S 81	Terminus
Location

Freudenstadt Hauptbahnhof is the main station in the town of Freudenstadt in the German state of Baden-Württemberg, and an important railway junction in the Northern Black Forest.

== Location ==
Freudenstadt Hauptbahnhof is located on the southeastern edge of the city, where Bahnhofstraße meets Dietersweiler Straße. Its address is Hauptbahnhof 1.

== Construction of the station ==
In the station building there is a Deutsche Bahn ticket office, a bakery and a kiosk.

The station has a main platform (platform 1) and an additional island platform (platform tracks 2 and 3). Platform 1 mainly serves Stadtbahn traffic towards Karlsruhe (Murg Valley Railway, Murgtalbahn) and track 2 handles all traffic on the Eutingen im Gäu–Schiltach railway line towards Eutingen im Gäu and Stuttgart. Some Stadtbahn trips (from Karlsruhe continuing to Eutingen in Gäu and vice versa) also operate from platform 2. Services on the Eutingen im Gäu–Schiltach railway line towards Hausach and Offenburg mainly use track 3.

There are various parking facilities and a bus station at the station.

== Operations ==
=== Regional transport ===
Line	Route	Frequency
RE 14b	Freudenstadt – Dornstetten – Schopfloch (b Freudenstadt) – Hochdorf (b Horb) – Eutingen im Gäu – Herrenberg – Böblingen – Stuttgart	Every 120 minutes
RB 20	Freudenstadt – Alpirsbach – Schiltach – Wolfach – Hausach – Haslach – Biberach (Baden) – Gengenbach – Offenburg (– Bad Griesbach (Schwarzw))	Every 60 minutes
RE 40	Karlsruhe– Rastatt – Gaggenau – Gernsbach – Forbach (Schwarzwald) – Baiersbronn – Freudenstadt Stadt – Freudenstadt Hbf	Every 120 minutes

=== Karlsruhe Stadtbahn ===
Line	Route	Frequency
S 8	Karlsruhe Tullastraße – Karlsruhe Marktplatz – Karlsruhe Bahnhofsvorplatz – Karlsruhe Albtalbahnhof – Rastatt – Gaggenau – Gernsbach – Forbach (Schwarzwald) – Baiersbronn – Freudenstadt Stadt – Freudenstadt Hbf – Dornstetten – Schopfloch (b Freudenstadt) – Hochdorf (b Horb) – Eutingen im Gäu	30 minutes between Karlsruhe Hbf and Freudenstadt Stadt, 60 minutes intervals to Freudenstadt Hbf, 120 minutes to Eutingen
S 81	Karlsruhe Hbf – Bruchsal – Karlsruhe Hbf – Rastatt – Gaggenau – Gernsbach – Forbach – Baiersbronn – Freudenstadt Stadt – Freudenstadt Hbf	120 minute interval, fast service
