= Ortenau Regional S-Bahn =

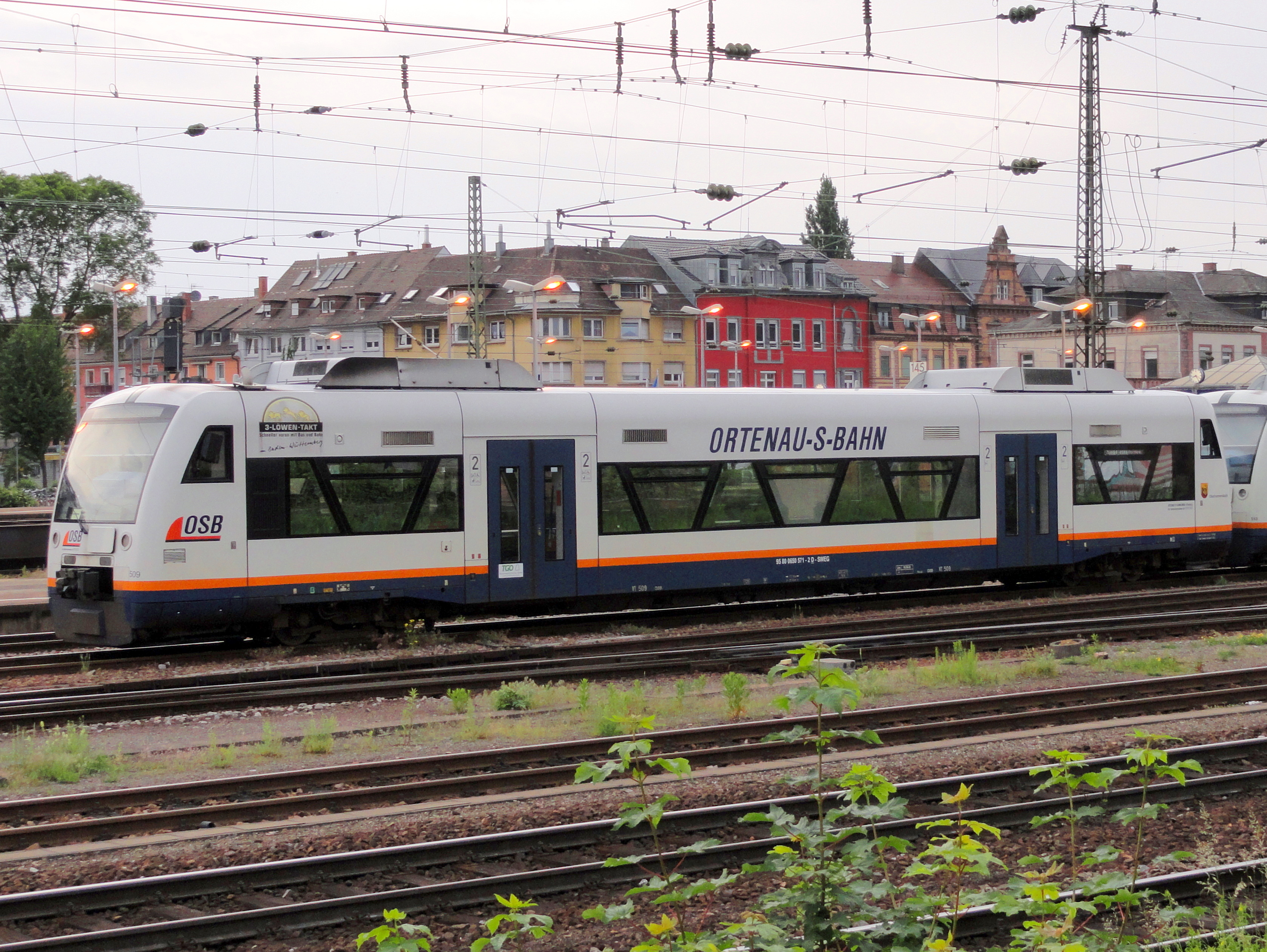
- Ortenau-S-Bahn train in Offenburg in 2010

Overview
- Parent company: Südwestdeutsche Landesverkehrs-GmbH
- Dates of operation: 1998–2014 (as independent company)
- Successor: Südwestdeutsche Landesverkehrs-GmbH

Ortenau Regional S-Bahn is the brand name of the Südwestdeutsche Landesverkehrs-GmbH (SWEG), a transport company owned by the state of Baden-Württemberg, used for suburban and regional railway services in the Ortenau area with services extending to the neighbouring city of Strasbourg in France, centering on Offenburg station. Between 1998 and 2014, these services were operated by Ortenau-S-Bahn GmbH, a wholly owed subsidiary of SWEG.

== Services ==
As of the December 2021 timetable change, the Ortenau-S-Bahn branding encompasses the following services, although unlike most German S-Bahn systems they are not designated with an 'S' and the white/green S-Bahn logo:

- Achern–Ottenhöfen (Acher Valley Railway)
- Offenburg–Appenweier–Bad Griesbach (Rench Valley Railway)
- Offenburg–Appenweier–Kehl–Strasbourg-Ville (Appenweier–Strasbourg railway)
- Offenburg–Hausach–Hornberg (Black Forest Railway)
- Offenburg–Hausach–Wolfach–Freudenstadt (Kinzig Valley Railway)
- Biberach–Oberharmersbach-Riersbach (Harmersbach Valley Railway)

== See also ==
- Rail transport in France
- Rail transport in Germany
