= Kinzig Valley Railway (Black Forest) =

Railway line in the Black Forest, Germany

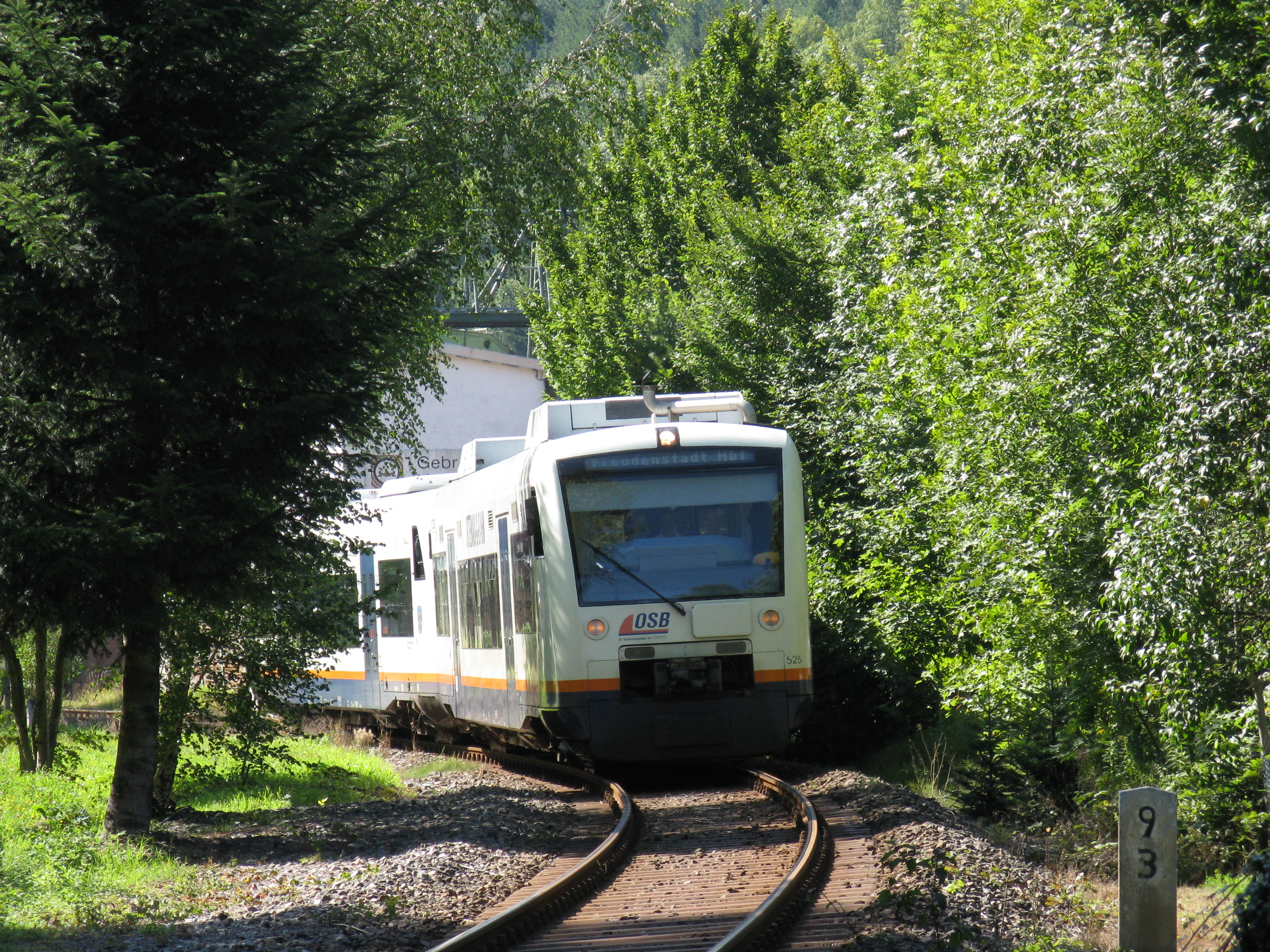
- A Regio-Shuttle of the Ortenau-S-Bahn leaves the halt of Wolfach-Halbmeil

Overview
- Line number: 4251

Service
- Route number: 721

Technical
- Line length: 14.2 km (8.8 mi)
- Track gauge: 1,435 mm (4 ft 8 1/2 in) standard gauge
- Operating speed: 100 km/h (62 mph)

The Kinzig Valley Railway (German: Kinzigtalbahn) is a railway line in Germany that runs from Hausach to Schiltach and follows the Kinzig River that gives it its name. The line has several tunnels, is single-tracked, and unelectrified.

== History ==
The Kinzig Valley Railway was opened on 5 July 1878 from Hausach to Wolfach by the Grand Duchy of Baden State Railway and extended on 4 November 1886 to Schiltach. At the same time the Royal Württemberg State Railways cleared the section from Schiltach to Freudenstadt Hbf for traffic.

== Route ==
The line diverges from the Black Forest Railway at Hausach and runs east along the Kinzig River to Schiltach, for a total length of 14.2 kilometres (8.8 mi). At Schiltach, the line continues as the Eutingen im Gäu–Schiltach railway line.

The Schiltach-Schramberg railway used to branch off at Schiltach. This line was opened in 1892, but closed in 1959 to passenger services and in 1990 to goods traffic as well. At Schiltach station a railbus rake and the old railway bridge over the Kinzig recalls this branch that, today, has been full dismantled. In Schramberg there is still an overgrown buffer stop and the former station tavern, which is used today as a clubhouse for the Black Riders. The old trackbed is used today as a cycle path.

== Operations ==
The Kinzigtalbahn is owned by DB Netz AG. It was formerly operated by Deutsche Bahn, but services were taken over on 12 December 2004 by the Ortenau S-Bahn (OSB). Since then it has run hourly through services from Freudenstadt Hbf to Offenburg, the section from Hausach to Offenburg being the Baden Black Forest Railway The trains usually cross in Alpirsbach at the usual meeting time just before the hour. The majority of trains run on past Offenburg to Bad Griesbach, the terminus of the Rench Valley Railway. At the weekend a morning train runs through to Strasbourg in France.

Air-conditioned Regio Shuttles of the Ortenau S-Bahn are used. On "normal days" about 2200 people use the trains on the Kinzig Valley Railway.

At Freudenstadt, the Ortenau S-Bahn services meet those of the Karlsruhe Stadtbahn, operating by Albtal-Verkehrs-Gesellschaft (AVG), using their fleet of tram-trains, over the Murgtalbahn to Karlsruhe.
