= List of rail accidents in France =

This is a list of rail accidents in France.

The attack on the Thalys train on 2015 is not listed, since no train accident occurred.

== Rail accidents in France ==
Accident	Date	Location	Killed	Injured	Description	Ref.
Annot derailment	8 February 2014	Between Annot and Saint-Benoît, Alpes-de-Haute-Provence	2	20	A train travelling from Nice to Digne-les-Bains on the Chemins de Fer de Provence was hit by a rock which fell down a mountain side. Both vehicles of the train were derailed.	
Brétigny-sur-Orge train crash	12 July 2013	Brétigny-sur-Orge, Île-de-France	7	32	A train crash occurred in the commune of Brétigny-sur-Orge in the southern suburbs of Paris, when a passenger train carrying 385 people derailed and hit the station platform. The crash was cited as the most serious in France since the 1988 Gare de Lyon accident in which 56 people were killed.	
Eckwersheim derailment	14 November 2015	Eckwersheim, Bas-Rhin	11	42	A TGV train derailed in Eckwersheim, Alsace, while performing commissioning trials on the second phase of the LGV Est high-speed rail line, which was scheduled to open for commercial service five months later. It was the first fatal derailment in the history of the TGV and the third derailment since the TGV entered commercial service in 1981.	
Ingenheim derailment	5 March 2020	Ingenheim, Bas-Rhin	0	22	A TGV train derailed near Ingenheim, Bas-Rhin, Grand Est, on the LGV Est rail line due to a landslip.	
Montparnasse derailment	22 October 1895	Paris Montparnasse	1	6	The Granville–Paris Express overran the buffer stop at its Gare Montparnasse terminus. With the train several minutes late and the driver trying to make up for lost time, it approached the station too fast and there was a failure to apply the train air brake. After running through the buffer stop, the train crossed the station concourse and crashed through the station wall; the locomotive fell onto the Place de Rennes below, where it stood on its nose.	
Saint-Michel-de-Maurienne derailment	12 December 1917	Saint-Michel-de-Maurienne	675	-	The Saint-Michel-de-Maurienne derailment was a railway accident involving a troop train carrying at least 1,000 French soldiers on their way home for leave from the Italian Front in World War I. A derailment as the train descended the Maurienne valley on the Culoz–Modane railway caused a catastrophic crash and subsequent fire. It is still France's deadliest rail accident to date.	
Versailles rail accident	8 May 1842	Meudon	52–200	Hundreds	A train returning to Paris derailed at Meudon after the leading locomotive broke an axle, and the carriages behind piled into it and caught fire. It was the first French railway accident and the deadliest in the world at the time. The accident led the French to abandon the practice of locking passengers in their carriages.	
1961 Vitry-Le-François train bombing	18 June 1961	Blacy, Marne	28	Hundreds	Bomb attack on a Strasbourg–Paris train carried out by the Organisation armée secrète (OAS), a paramilitary organization opposed to the independence of Algeria in the Algerian War.	
Zoufftgen train collision	11 October 2006	Zoufftgen, Moselle	6	20	Two trains collided head-on while one track of a double track line was out of service for maintenance.	
Denguin rail crash	17 July 2014	Denguin, Pyrénées-Atlantiques	0	40	A TER passenger train collided with a SNCF TGV express train near Denguin, Pyrénées-Atlantiques.	
Gare de Lyon rail accident	27 June 1988	Paris-Gare de Lyon rail station	56	60	An SNCF commuter train headed inbound to Paris's Gare de Lyon terminal crashed into a stationary outbound train, resulting in the third deadliest rail disaster in peacetime France.	
Lagny-Pomponne rail accident	23 December 1933	Between Pomponne and Lagny-sur-Marne	204	120	The 4-8-2 locomotive of the express for Strasbourg crashed at 110 km/h (65 mph) into the rear of an auxiliary train bound for Nancy, which was stopped on the railway. The impact crushed and splintered the last five cars of the Nancy train, older wooden cars pressed into service for the holidays. Both trains were full of people going home to their families for Christmas.	
Perpignan crash	14 December 2017	Millas, Arrondissement of Perpignan, Occitanie	6	24	A train crashed into a school bus on a level crossing between Millas and Saint-Féliu-d'Amont. The bus was severed into two.	

== See also ==
- List of rail accidents by country
- Lists of rail accidents
- French Land Transport Accident Investigation Bureau (BEA-TT)
