= List of TGV accidents =

TGV accidents are events involving TGV trains which have harmful consequences, such as injury to people or damage to trains, or derailments. High-speed rail is one of the safest modes of transportation; since service started in 1964, there have only been fatalities in high-speed operation in a 2015 derailment. Today TGV trains accumulate of the order of 50 billion passenger-kilometres per year on lignes à grande vitesse (high-speed lines) alone. 1.2 billion passengers have travelled on the TGV.

TGV operations fall into two categories: operations on dedicated, TGV-only high-speed lines (LGVs), and operation in mixed traffic on lignes classiques, conventional lines. Indeed, of the total track length served by TGV trains only about 25% (by route kilometre) is high-speed. In understanding the incident summaries below, it is important to bear this distinction in mind. Most of the serious incidents have occurred on conventional lines, where TGV trains are exposed to the same external risks as any other train. High-speed operation was never a factor in any fatal incident in the history of the TGV until November 14, 2015 when a TGV testing on the new Paris–Strasbourg line derailed violently into a canal, killing eleven and injuring the surviving 42 passengers.

Following the number of accidents at level crossings, an effort has been made to remove all level crossings on lignes classiques used by TGVs. The ligne classique from Tours to Bordeaux at the end of the LGV Atlantique has no level crossings as a result.

== Incident summaries ==
The summaries below are not comprehensive. Most of the "major" incidents are described, but there have been others:

=== On high-speed lines ===
- Excessive speed
- An aerodynamic fairing lost due to incorrect maintenance, that broke a window and injured a passenger
- At least five strikes of animals on the track
- At least two fires, one in a baggage compartment and the other in a power unit
- At least two incidents in which a passenger door opened at speed
- One instance of concrete placed on the track
- One instance of an attempted terrorist bombing of the track

=== On lignes classiques ===
- A passenger killed trying to board a moving train
- A conductor killed trying to board a moving train
- A passenger injured on a platform by a broken shock absorber
- A broken tripod (transmission component)
- A collision due to operator error during a switching move
- An arson attack on an empty parked trainset
- Two instances of operator forgetting to set the parking brake, resulting in low-speed collisions with fixed objects.
- There have been events where pedestrians on the tracks were hit and killed, both suicides and accidents.

The list above together with the summaries below form a complete history of major TGV incidents up to 5 January 2001.

== Serious incidents ==
=== 31 December 1983: Terrorist bombing ===
Trainset involved: Sud-Est, unknown
Service: Marseille to Paris
Location: Near Tain-l'Hermitage, south of Lyon in the Rhône Valley
Injuries: 2 people died in the bombing of the TGV.

The bomb was placed in a luggage rack in a trailer vestibule. It exploded at about the same time as another bomb which was placed in a baggage locker in the Marseille St-Charles station. The toll from both bombs totalled 5 dead and 50 injured. Both bombs were the work of the infamous terrorist Carlos the Jackal.

=== 23 September 1988: Level crossing accident ===
Trainset involved: 70 (Sud-Est)
Service: train 736, Grenoble to Paris
Location: PN 74, Voiron
Injuries: 2 dead, 60 injured

A special road transport with a weight of 80 tons became stranded on level crossing 74. Train 736, rounding a curve toward the crossing, ploughed into it at 110 km/h (68 mph). The large mass of the road vehicle made this crash much worse than it might otherwise have been; the engineer and one passenger died, and many more were injured when the first trailer was ripped open by debris. Only the leading power unit derailed. This wreck, the most violent to date, became a reference for the design and crash testing of safety features for the next generation of TGV, as embodied by today's Duplex trainsets. These newer trains have several deformable sections, at the front and rear of the power unit and at the front of the first trailer, to manage and absorb crash energy without damage to passenger compartments. Trainset 70 was never returned to service, and the trailing unit 23140 became a spare in the Sud-Est fleet.

=== 14 December 1992: High-speed derailment ===
Trainset involved: Sud-Est, unknown
Service: train 920, Annecy to Paris
Location: Mâcon-Loché TGV station, kilometre post 334, LGV Sud-Est high speed line
Injuries: 27, slight

The accident trainset had been involved in an emergency stop previously, which resulted in a significant wheel flat. At 0733, the flat spot caused one bogie of the trainset to derail as it passed through the Mâcon-Loché station at 270 km/h (170 mph). Projections of ballast stones caused injuries to people standing on the station platform waiting for train 970. The train came to a stop safely.

=== 21 December 1993: High-speed derailment ===
Trainset involved: 511 (Réseau)
Service: train 7150, Valenciennes to Paris
Location: TGV Haute-Picardie station, kilometre post 110.5, LGV Nord (Paris–Lille) high speed line
Injuries: 1, slight

The incident set a record for the world's fastest derailment. It occurred before the TGV Haute Picardie station was built, near the southern end of where the platforms are located today. After a period of heavy rains, a large sink hole opened under track 2 (southbound). Two trains had already passed this spot and detected no anomaly as late as 10 minutes before the accident. At 0706, TGV 7150 was bearing down at 294 km/h (183 mph) on a muddy hole 7 by 4 metres (23 ft × 13 ft) and 1.5 metres (4 ft 11 in) deep, bridged by a section of unsupported track. The engineer felt a slight bump and made a service brake application. The last four trailers and the rear power unit derailed, and the train came to a rocky stop over a distance of 2.3 kilometres (1.4 mi) (somewhat less than it takes for a conventional emergency stop). It was fortunate that the train did not jackknife or leave the track bed; this is credited in part to the stiffness that the articulated design lends to the train. Only one passenger was injured, and another treated for shock. The sinkhole was traced to unstable terrain beneath the track bed, possibly caused by galleries and trenches from World War I. How closely a disaster was averted is a matter of debate; however, the trackbed has since been carefully inspected to prevent similar occurrences in the future.

=== 10 August 1995: Level crossing accident ===
Trainset involved: 394 (Atlantique)
Service: train 8737, Paris to Brest
Location: Near Vitré, kilometre post 342, PN 172 level crossing with road D34
Injuries: 2, slight

A tractor–trailer combination with farm equipment became stuck on the level crossing in a relatively tight, canted curve of the Paris–Brest line. The automatic crossing gates came down and the train, approaching at 140 km/h (87 mph), hit the unoccupied vehicle. The train did not derail and came to a stop about 1.6 km (0.99 mi) after the impact following an emergency brake application. Damage was limited to the nose of trainset 394, as well as a catenary mast and level crossing gates.

=== 25 September 1997: Level crossing accident ===
Trainset involved: 502 (Réseau)
Service: train 7119, Paris to Dunkerque
Location: Bierne, 10 km (6.2 mi) south of Dunkerque
Injuries: 7, slight

An asphalt paving machine became stranded on a level crossing near Bergues. TGV 7119, running 80 minutes late because of a strike, hit the machine at 130 km/h (81 mph). The leading power unit left the rails, spun around to the left, and came to rest on its side down the track embankment. The engineer suffered minor injuries, and the unit was destroyed. Four trailers derailed and two left the track bed. None of them rolled over thanks to the articulated design of the train; very few passengers were injured.

Trainset 502 was withdrawn from service and stored. The trailing power unit serves as a spare, and trailers R1 and R2 may be used to repair Thalys 4345, involved in the May 1998 level crossing collision.

=== 11 October 1997: Fire ===
Trainset involved: unknown (Sud-Est)
Service: train 644, Lyon to Paris
Location: near Montchanin, LGV Sud-Est high speed line
Injuries: none

The train developed a fire in the engine compartment. An emergency stop was performed, and fire services began extinguishing the blaze a half hour later. The fire was confined to the leading power unit of the double trainset formation. The unit involved was a recently renovated Sud-Est set, although it is unknown if this was a factor. The 621 passengers were transferred to another trainset and experienced a five-hour delay.

=== 19 November 1997: Level crossing accident ===
Trainset involved: Atlantique, unknown
Service: Brest to Paris, unknown
Location: D140 road at Neau, near Laval
Injuries: 6, slight

A tractor–trailer combination carrying a load of calcium carbonate became disabled on a level crossing. The driver was able to escape from the vehicle before the train hit it at 140 km/h (87 mph), derailing one bogie and damaging tracks and catenary.

=== 9 May 1998: Level crossing accident ===
Trainset involved: 4345 (Thalys PBKA)
Service: train 9344, Amsterdam to Paris
Location: near Hoeven, southern Netherlands
Injuries: 1 dead, 6 slight injuries

A truck attempted to cross the tracks at an unprotected level crossing when the train arrived. The truck driver was killed in the impact and the train's power unit and first two trailers derailed. The trainset was heavily damaged. Six passengers were injured and tracks and catenary were damaged in the incident. Trailers R1 and R2 had to be scrapped. The trainset was later repaired with the R1 and R2 trailers from TGV trainset 502, involved in the 25 September 1997 accident.

=== 28 November 1998: Level crossing accident ===
Trainset involved: Atlantique, unknown
Service: unknown, Brest to Paris
Location: level crossing 303, near Guipavas (29)
Injuries: none

On a day when rail workers were on strike, a double TGV trainset that had left Brest at 0854 struck a stranded semi-truck/lorry just 8 minutes into its journey near Guipavas. The 23‑year‑old driver of the truck jumped out of the way and escaped uninjured after losing his way and getting stuck on the crossing while attempting to turn around. Travelling at less than 120 km/h (75 mph) the TGV struck and destroyed the vehicle, throwing debris onto a waiting car whose occupant also escaped unharmed. The lead power unit sustained heavy damage.

=== 5 June 2000: High-speed derailment ===
Trainset involved: Eurostar 3101/3102
Service: 9047, Paris–London
Location: LGV Nord-Europe, near Croisilles (10 km (6.2 mi) south of Arras)
Injuries: 14, slight

Belgian trainset 3101–3102 was covering Eurostar 9047 (Paris to London), travelling northbound on track 1 of the LGV Nord high speed line at 300 km/h (190 mph) with 501 passengers on board. The engineer detected an anomalous vibration and reduced speed to 200 km/h (120 mph), before resuming full speed a short time afterwards. At 1754 local time, as the trainset passed 290 km/h (180 mph) near the village of Croisilles, 14 km (8.7 mi) south of Arras, at the level of the track switch for the branch line to Arras, a transmission assembly failed. A reaction link on the rear bogie of the leading power car became separated from the bogie frame, leading to catastrophic failure of the transmission assembly with parts falling onto the track. The failure and ensuing emergency stop caused the failed bogie 2 (numbered from the front), bogie 3 and bogie 23 on the trailing power car to leave the rails. The partly derailed train came to a stop safely 1500 m further, causing some damage to the track. 14 people, including the British engineer, were treated for light injuries or shock, and passengers resumed their trip to London on buses. Once again, as in the 1993 TGV derailment, the articulated trainset architecture was credited with maintaining stability and integrity of the train as it came to a stop. How closely disaster was averted is again debatable. The train remained mostly aligned on the trackbed, thanks to construction and low centre of gravity.

=== 5 January 2001: Derailment ===
Trainset involved: Atlantique, unknown
Service: 8720, Brest–Paris
Location: Ligne classique near Laval (Mayenne)
Injuries: none.

Following a winter storm, a mudslide covered the tracks. The engineer/driver of the 0649 TGV out of Brest, headed for Paris, saw the slide about 300 m ahead and was able to slow to 120 km/h (75 mph) before hitting the mud. A minor derailment of the power car ensued due to the emergency stop.

=== 30 January 2003: Level crossing accident ===
Trainset involved: unknown
Service: unknown, Dunkerque to Paris
Location: level crossing in Esquelbecq (59)
Injuries: 1, slight

Travelling at 106 km/h (66 mph), the train collided with a heavy goods vehicle stuck on the level crossing at Esquelbecq in northern France. The front power car was severely damaged, but only one bogie derailed. The train driver was slightly injured.

=== 20 December 2007: Level crossing accident ===
Trainset involved: Sud-Est, 46
Service: unknown, Paris to Geneva
Location: level crossing near Tossiat (01)
Injuries: 1 dead, 1 serious injury, 24 slight injuries

Travelling at about 100 km/h (62 mph), the train collided with a truck which had stopped on the crossing as it could not fit under the overhead wires. The train derailed and the front power car (23139) was severely damaged and later written off. The truck driver was killed, and on the train there were one seriously injured and 24 slightly injured.

=== 15 July 2014: Collision with a TER train ===
Trains involved: TGV Atlantique, Z 7300 (TER n°867285)
Service: 8585, Tarbes to Paris, on the Pau–Bayonne line
Location: Near Denguin
Injuries: 40 (4 seriously)

A regional express train (train express regional TER) crashed at 90 km/h (56 mph) into the rear end of a TGV train which was moving at 30 km/h (19 mph) in the same direction ahead of it, due to a faulty signal.

=== 14 November 2015: Derailment at high speed into a canal. ===
Train involved: High speed TGV.
Service: testing new Paris–Strasbourg line not yet in passenger service.
Location: Eckwersheim, on the LGV Est high-speed rail line
Casualties: 11 dead, 42 injured.
Cause initially reported as excessive speed.
