= Eckwersheim derailment =

Train crash in Alsace, France on 14 November 2015

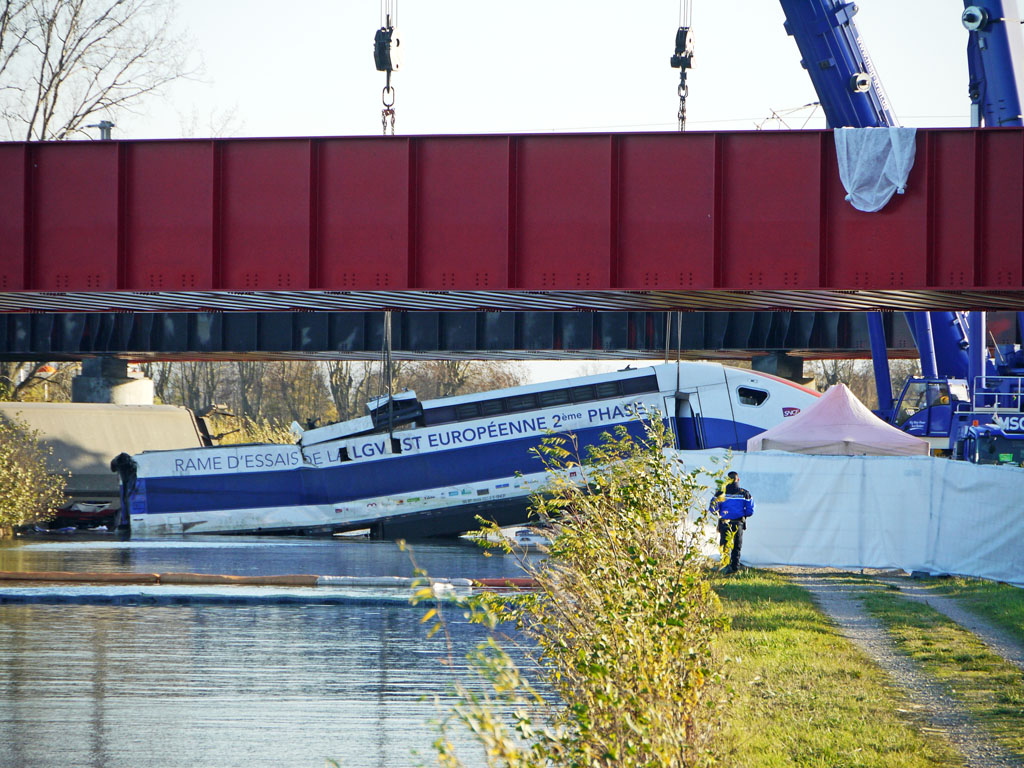
- Rear power car of derailed train

- Location within France

Details
- Date: 14 November 2015; 15:05 (CET)
- Location: Eckwersheim, Bas-Rhin
- Coordinates: 48.6902°N 7.7053°E
- Country: France
- Line: LGV Est phase 2
- Operator: SNCF
- Incident type: Derailment
- Cause: Excessive speed on curve due to late braking

Statistics
- Trains: 1
- Passengers: 4 (Note: Four minors, ages 10–15, aboard the train were not authorized by SNCF but are counted as "passengers".)
- Crew: 49
- Deaths: 11
- Injured: 42, including 22 seriously injured

On 14 November 2015, a TGV train derailed in Eckwersheim, Alsace, France, while performing commissioning trials on the second phase of the LGV Est high-speed rail line, which was scheduled to open for commercial service five months later. The derailment resulted in 11 deaths and 42 injuries. It was the first fatal derailment in the history of the TGV and the third derailment since the TGV entered commercial service in 1981, as well as the deadliest train crash in France since the Gare de Lyon crash in 1988, which killed 56 people.

The test train was traveling eastbound on the southern track when it entered a curve at 265 km/h (165 mph)—90 km/h (56 mph) over its assigned speed—causing the rear bogie of the lead engine to derail to the left (outside of curve) due to centrifugal forces. The lead engine separated from the rest of the train, and the rear of the lead engine struck the concrete parapet on the abutment to a bridge over the Marne–Rhine Canal. The engine slid along the left parapet of the bridge and overturned, sliding down the embankment and coming to rest 150 m (490 ft) beyond the end of the bridge. Cars 2–7 derailed before the bridge and travelled off the embankment with enough inertia to overshoot the canal, coming to rest 80–130 m (260–430 ft) beyond the beginning of the bridge. Cars 8–9 came to rest on the east bank of the canal and the rear engine ended up partially submerged in the canal. According to investigators, late braking, which led to the train entering the curve at excessive speed, was the immediate cause of the accident. Criminal and technical investigations are ongoing. French national rail operator SNCF suspended test trials at high speeds until the lessons learned from the investigation were integrated into the testing process. The scheduled opening of the second phase of the LGV Est for commercial service was delayed three months, from 3 April 2016 to 3 July 2016.

== Background ==
The LGV Est européenne (often shortened to LGV Est) is a high-speed rail line connecting Paris and Strasbourg. Development has been divided into two phases. The first phase, from Vaires-sur-Marne near Paris, to Baudrecourt opened on 10 June 2007. Construction on the 106km second phase, from Baudrecourt to Vendenheim, near Strasbourg, began in 2010. The final weld of rails on the second phase occurred in March 2015, marking the completion of the line, although some work remained. At the time of the derailment, the line was scheduled to open for commercial service on 3 April 2016, following commissioning trials and training for operators.

The scheduled tests for the line consisted of four phases:

1. Factory testing of components of the line, completed in 2013–14;
2. On-site testing of components and functioning of subsystems, completed in 2013–2014;
3. Static testing of subsystems with slow-moving trains, completed from late 2014 to August 2015;
4. Dynamic testing of the line with trains operating at high speed, began in September 2015 and scheduled to have been completed in November 2015.

A specialized test train, Dasye set 744 in a commemorative livery, arrived to conduct the fourth phase of testing, which began on 28 September 2015. During this phase, more than 200 test runs would be performed on the line. The test runs would test ride smoothness, performance of the catenary, radio communications, and the signalling system. During some runs, the test train would operate at 10% above the planned operational speeds for the line when it entered service. Some automated safety systems were disabled to allow the test train to operate beyond normal operating conditions. Orientation training for operators was scheduled to take place between January and March 2016 prior to the start of commercial service on the line, which was scheduled for 3 April 2016 at the time of the accident. In January 2016, SNCF announced that the opening of the line would be delayed until 3 July 2016.

== Accident ==
=== Departure ===
External images
- Aerial overview of the crash site
- The test train

Tests scheduled for 11 and 14 November were to traverse each of the two tracks, in both directions of travel and at a test speed 10% above the speed limit when the line is in commercial service. On the afternoon of 14 November, the test train was scheduled to depart Meuse TGV Station at 14:18 and arrive at Strasbourg Station at 15:17. At 14:26, authorization was given to begin the test and the test train left Meuse TGV Station two minutes later. During this test, the test train traveled eastbound on Track 2, the southern track on the east–west oriented LGV Est, in the direction opposite normal operation (Strasbourg towards Paris). The Meuse-Strasbourg run was the last series of tests on the line during the fourth phase of tests.

The train reached a maximum speed of 352 km/h (219 mph) on sections where the speed limit was 320 km/h (200 mph). As the train approached the flying junction in the commune of Vendenheim, it should have slowed from 352 to 176 km/h (219 to 109 mph) before reaching Kilometer Point (KP) 403.809, where the speed limit was 160 km/h (99 mph). As the track begins a long, right-hand curve into the flying junction, it is on a raised embankment 5–8 m (16–26 ft) high and bridges the Marne–Rhine Canal. The flying junction marks the end of the LGV Est line, after which the train was to continue on an existing, non-high-speed rail line leading to Strasbourg Station.

=== Derailment ===
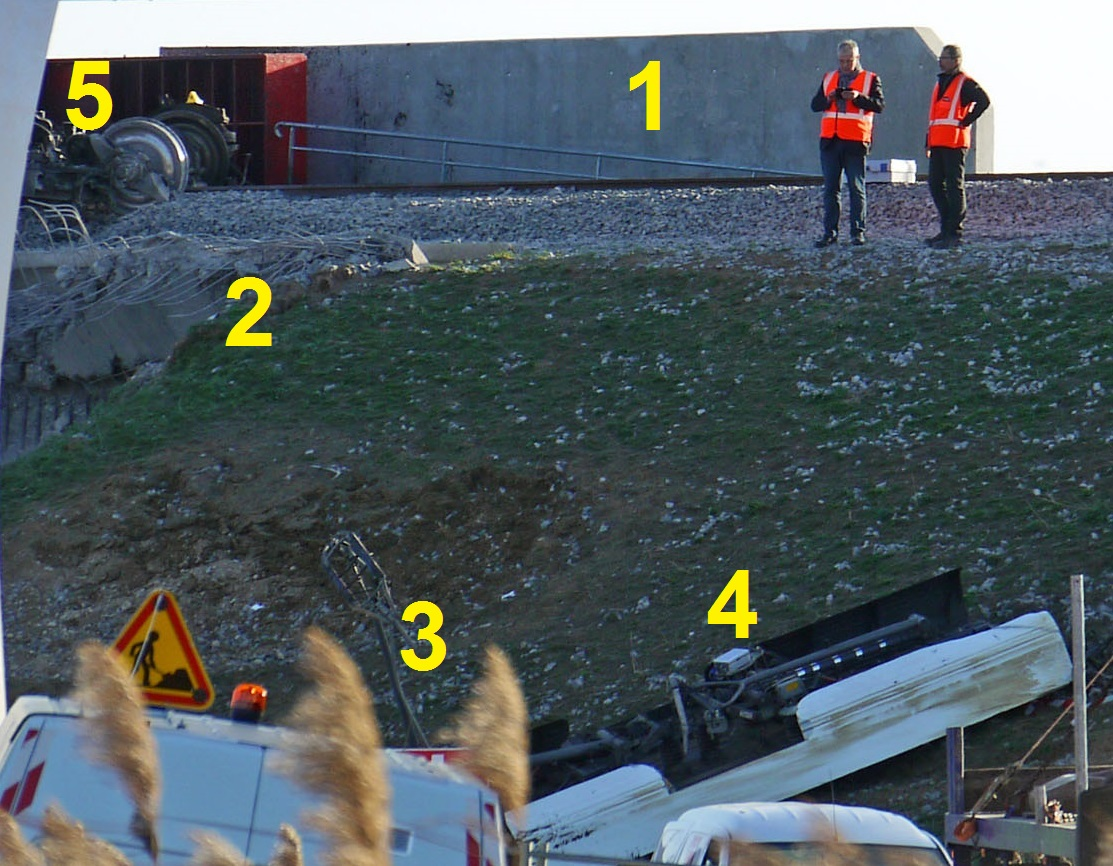
The concrete parapet on the southern side of the western abutment remains intact (1), while the concrete parapet on the northern side was impacted by the train and destroyed (2). A pantograph (3) and its subassembly (4), detached from one of the power cars, is seen in the bottom center. There is also a bogie remaining on the tracks (5).

As the train entered the right-hand curve into the flying junction, the rear bogie of the lead power car derailed to the left (outside of the curve) at 15:04:42 at approximately KP 404.003. Violent transverse movements at the rear of the lead power car caused it to separate from the rest of the train. The rear of the lead power car struck a concrete parapet (KP 404.209) on the leading abutment to the bridge over the Marne–Rhine Canal. The impact broke apart the lead power car and caused oil to leak from the lead power car's transformer, which ignited and was spread across the bridge and canal banks. The rear bogie of the lead power car remained where it impacted the concrete parapet. The transformer of the lead power car landed on the east bank of the canal. The remainder of the lead power car slid along the left parapet of the bridge. At the end of the bridge, it overturned, slid down the embankment and came to rest 150 m (490 ft) beyond the end of the bridge.

Cars 2–7 derailed before the bridge and traveled off the embankment with enough speed to overshoot the canal and come to rest 80–130 m (260–430 ft) beyond the beginning of the bridge. Cars 8–9 came to rest on the east bank of the canal and the rear power car ended up partially submerged in the canal.

=== Response and casualties ===
At 15:05, the train disappeared from the approach zone for the Vendenheim junction on the display being monitored by staff at the signalling control center. At 15:10, the control center initiated emergency procedures for the loss of a train and closed the non-high-speed rail lines that pass through the Vendenheim junction. At approximately the same time, one of the companies involved in the construction of the line received a call from an employee aboard the train, who informed them of the derailment. Shortly before 17:45, the local mass casualty plan was enacted. Emergency medical and fire rescue services along with 100 gendarmes responded to the incident. At its height, 104 engines from three départments responded to the incident—65 from Bas-Rhin and 39 from Moselle and Haut-Rhin. Those with minor injuries were treated by responders from the French Red Cross, which operated at the school in Eckwersheim. The French Minister of Ecology, Sustainable Development and Energy, Ségolène Royal, and the Secretary of State for Transport, Alain Vidalies, travelled to the site shortly after the crash. The president of SNCF, Guillaume Pepy, and the president of SNCF Réseau, Jacques Rapoport, also travelled to the site in the hours after the accident.

The train was carrying 53 people, including four children, ages 10–15, who were not officially authorized to be aboard. The derailment resulted in 11 deaths, which included four employees of SNCF, five technicians from Systra, the engineering firm responsible for the tests, and two guests. Ten died at the crash scene, one died the following evening, and one seriously injured person remained in hospital as of February 2016. Among the dead was the director of the LGV Est line for SNCF Réseau, which owns France's railroad infrastructure. Despite breaking in two pieces and the severe impact with the parapet, there were no deaths among the seven people in the front cab. The second-to-last car impacted the canal wall and was the car with the highest death toll. It was the first fatal derailment in the history of the TGV and the third derailment since the TGV entered commercial service in 1981.

== Investigation ==
Three investigations have been opened. The French Land Transport Accident Investigation Bureau (BEA-TT, Bureau d'Enquêtes sur les Accidents de Transport Terrestre), which is responsible for investigating rail accidents in France, opened a non-judicial technical investigation. The BEA-TT published its final report in March 2017.

A criminal investigation and internal investigation by SNCF have also been opened. Among the subjects which SNCF will investigate is whether there was a dereliction of duties by an SNCF employee that resulted in the unauthorized children riding on the train. The president of SNCF has exclaimed: "This is not a practice that SNCF recognizes. A test train is a test train." The derailment occurred the day after the November 2015 Paris attacks, initially sparking fears that the derailment was the work of terrorists.

On 19 November, SNCF announced the initial findings of their investigation. The train's event recorder indicated that the train entered the curve at 265km/h and was travelling at 243km/h at the moment it derailed, which investigators have determined to be a result of centrifugal forces. The speed at the moment of derailment was 67km/h above the train's assigned operating speed on the curve. According to the SNCF, the "immediate cause" of the accident was "a late braking sequence"; the braking should have begun at least 1km or 12 seconds earlier. The investigation has found no fault for the accident in the infrastructure, train, or member of the technical team. There were seven people in the driving cab at the time of the accident, all of whom survived. Investigators have suggested that this may have been a factor in the late braking. SNCF began disciplinary proceedings and take punitive measures against employees responsible for, among other things, the "reckless presence" of children on the test train, presence of seven people in the cab, the lack of rigor in creating lists of those onboard and controlling access to the train, and "without doubt" the human errors in the cab.

== Aftermath ==
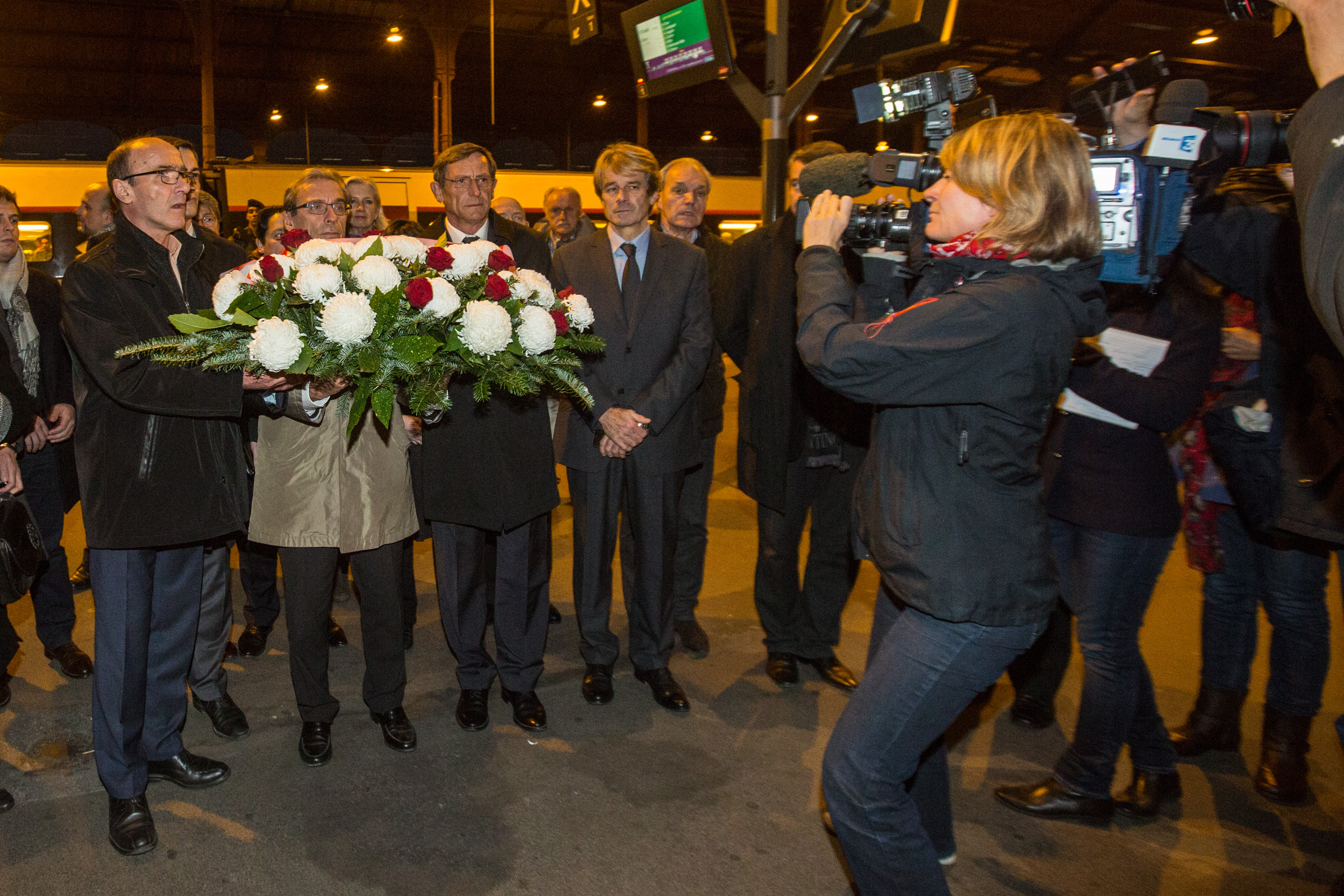
Ceremony in remembrance of the victims at Strasbourg station, 16 November

SNCF held a minute of silence for the victims during the course of operations on Monday, 16 November. The following day, a memorial service was held in the church in Mundolsheim, which was attended by SNCF President Guillaume Pepy. SNCF suspended all test trials at high speeds until the lessons learned from the investigation can be integrated into testing processes. A memorial garden and stone marker were dedicated at the site on the first anniversary of the accident.

The scheduled opening of the second phase of the LGV Est for commercial service was delayed by three months, from 3 April to 3 July 2016. Until 11 December 2016, a short segment of the line around the site of the derailment was limited to a single track while repairs on the damaged track were completed.

== See also ==
- List of TGV accidents
- Salisbury rail crash (1906), a LSWR boat train from Plymouth's Friary railway station to London Waterloo station failed to navigate a sharp curve at the eastern end of Salisbury railway station in Wiltshire, England.
- Amagasaki rail crash (2005), a suburban train crash that occurred on a curve at high speed in Japan.
- Santiago de Compostela derailment (2013), a fatal derailment in Spain of a high-speed train in commercial service which entered a curve at twice the speed limit.
- Ingenheim derailment - TGV derailment in Bas-Rhin
