= Alice De Wolf Kellogg =

American painter (1862–1900)

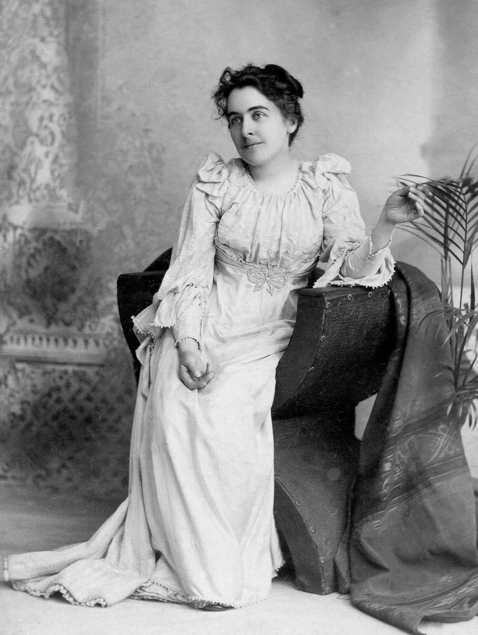
- Born: December 27, 1862; Chicago, Illinois
- Died: February 4, 1900 (aged 37); Chicago, Illinois
- Education: Academy of Fine Arts, Académie Julian, Académie Colarossi
- Known for: Painting
- Notable work: The Mother, painting
- Spouse: Orno James Tyler (m. 1894)

Alice De Wolf Kellogg (December 27, 1862 – February 4, 1900) was an American painter whose work was exhibited at the 1893 World's Columbian Exposition.

== Early life ==
Kellogg was born in Chicago, Illinois, the fifth of six daughters born to physician John Leonard Kellogg and his wife Mary Gage Kellogg. Young Alice was afflicted with nephritis, the disease which would eventually kill her. Encouraged by her father John, a practitioner of holistic medicine, Alice sought relief from her headaches and depression by studying metaphysical ideas and practices including spiritualism, Swedenborgianism, and the writings of Mary Baker Eddy.

== New Woman ==
As educational opportunities were made more available in the 19th century, women artists became part of professional enterprises, including founding their own art associations. Artwork made by women was considered to be inferior, and to help overcome that stereotype women became "increasingly vocal and confident" in promoting women's work, and thus became part of the emerging image of the educated, modern and freer "New Woman". Artists then "played crucial roles in representing the New Woman, both by drawing images of the icon and exemplyfying this emerging type through their own lives."

== Education and career ==
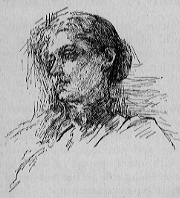
Portrait of Jane Addams, from a charcoal drawing in 1892 by Kellogg.

Kellogg studied at the Academy of Fine Arts, where she won the school's top prize, three months' tuition, and began teaching in 1887. In 1887 she traveled to Europe, where she spent time in England and studied at the Académie Julian, the Académie Colarossi, and the private atelier of American expatriate painter Charles Lasar in Paris. Her correspondence about her fellow American students' experience and work in Parisian art schools is a valuable record of life as an American artist in Europe, and the letters now reside at the Smithsonian Institution Archives of American Art. Kellogg exhibited paintings at the 1888 and 1889 Paris Salon exhibitions and at the Exposition Universelle of 1889.

Her most well-known work is The Mother, an 1889 painting which was exhibited in the Woman's Building at the 1893 World's Columbian Exposition. At that exposition she also exhibited paintings at the Palace of Fine Arts and the Illinois Building. The painting was a modern variation on the Madonna theme, depicting a woman holding a sleeping baby on her lap. The Society of American Artists elected Kellogg to join their organization after The Mother was shown at their 1891 annual exhibition, and the painting was reproduced as the frontispiece of the January 1893 issue of Century Illustrated Monthly Magazine.

Her work is in the permanent collection of the Jane Addams Hull-House Museum. A pair of her paintings appeared on a 2014 edition of Antiques Roadshow; the two together were valued at $12,000.

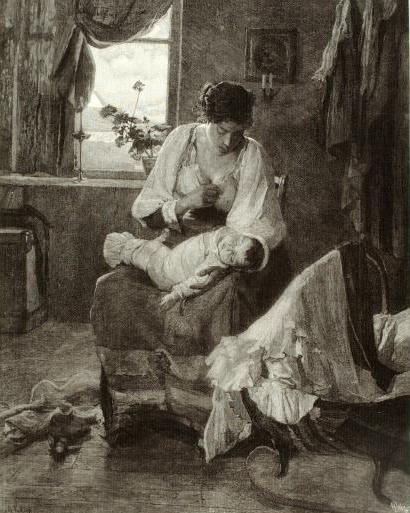
The Mother by Alice De Wolf Kellogg 1892, wood engraving on paper by Henry Wolf

== Exhibitions ==
- New York Water Color Club, 1898
- Pennsylvania Academy of Fine Arts, Philadelphia, 1898
- AIC American Water Color Society, NYC
- Paris Salon de la Societe Nationale des Beaux-Arts, 1890
- Annual Exhibition, Bohemian Art Club, AIC, 1883
- Annual Exhibition, Palette Club, AIC, 1895
- World's Columbian Exposition, Chicago, 1893
- Society of American Artists, NYC
