= Jacobs bogie =

Rail vehicle component

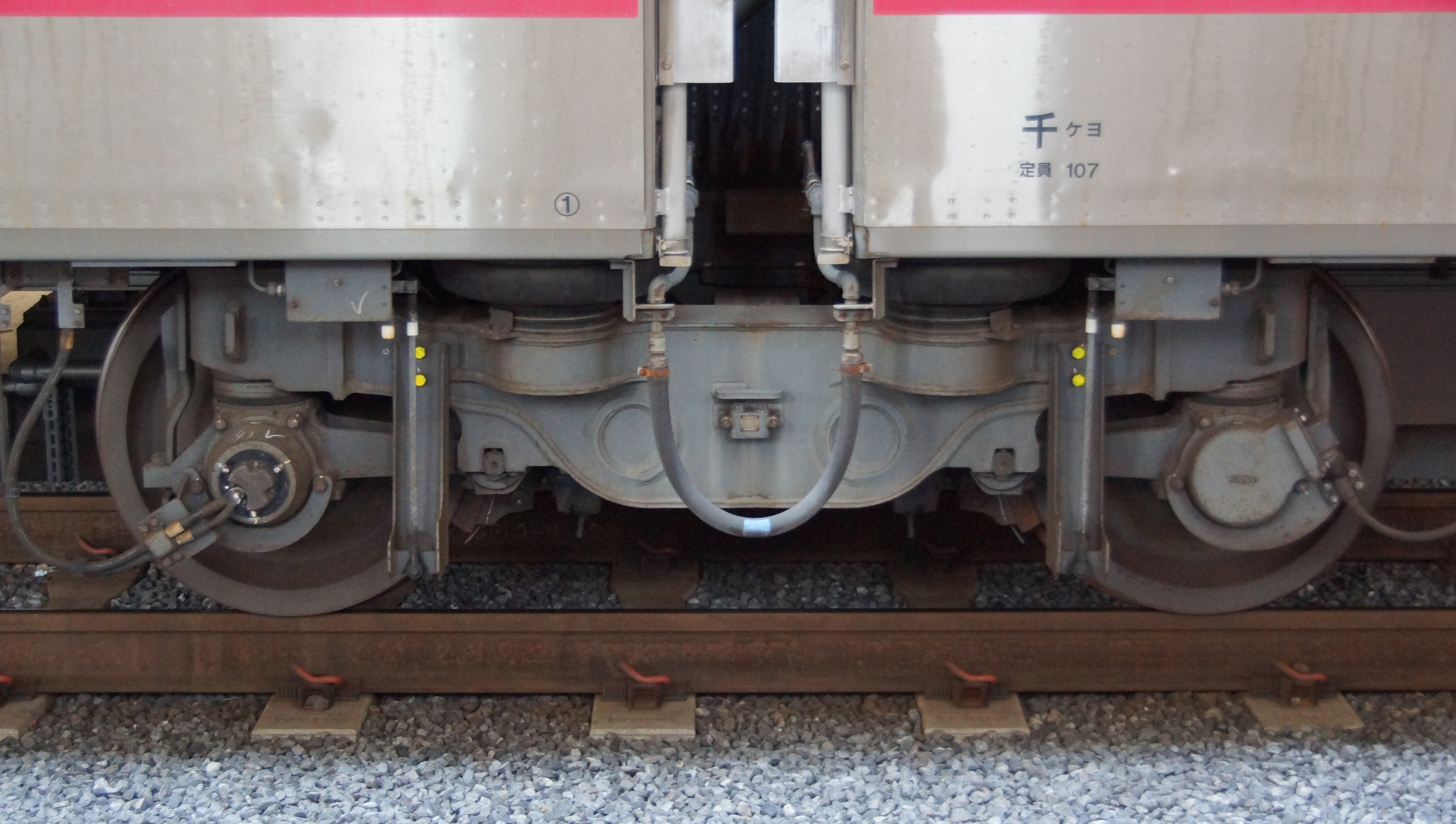
Jacobs bogie on the JR East E331 series EMU

Jacobs bogies (named after Wilhelm Jakobs, 1858–1942, a German railway-engineer) are a type of rail-vehicle bogie commonly found on articulated railcars and tramway vehicles.

Instead of supporting an individual piece of rolling stock, Jacobs bogies are placed between two carriages. The weight of each carriage is spread across the Jacobs bogie. This arrangement provides the smooth ride of bogie carriages without additional weight and drag.

Talgo trains use modified Jacobs bogies that only use two wheels; the wheels are allowed to spin independently of each other, eliminating hunting oscillation.

== Background ==
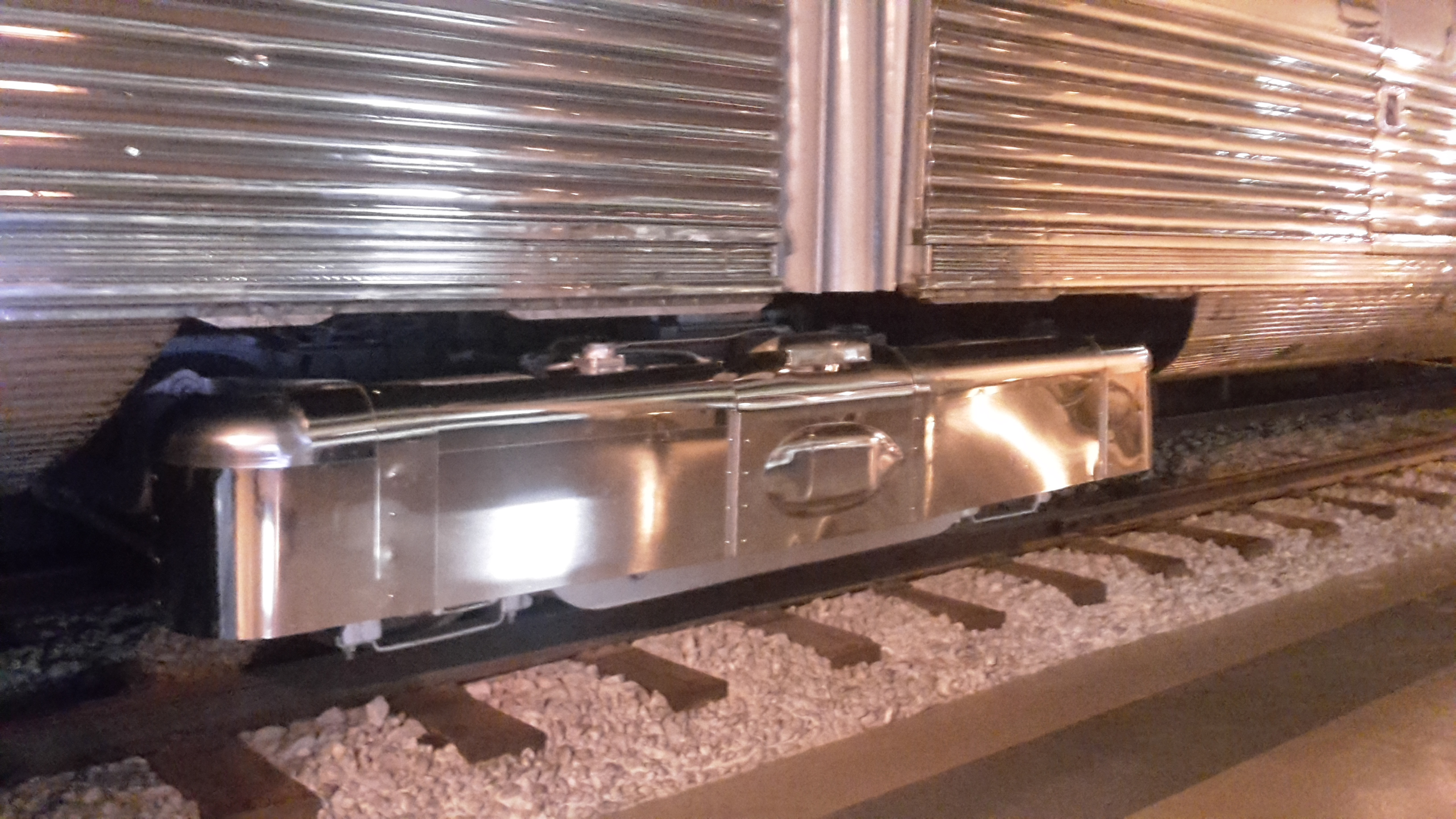
Jakobs bogie of the Pioneer Zephyr (CB&Q 9900, Budd 1934)

The first fast train using this type of bogie was the German Fliegender Hamburger in 1932. In the United States, such configurations were used throughout the twentieth century with some success on early streamlined passenger trainsets, such as the Pioneer Zephyr in 1934, various Southern Pacific Daylight articulated cars, and Union Pacific Railroad's M-10000. Dallas Area Rapid Transit rail trains originally used a center bogie in a two-car unit but these have been modified to add a lower center section for handicapped level entry making a 3-car unit with two Jacobs bogies.

Vehicles featuring Jacobs bogies include the British Rail Class 370, the New Zealand EW class locomotive, KTX-I, KTX-Sancheon and Class 373 high-speed trains, the Bombardier Talent series of multiple units, the LINT41, the Class 423 S-Bahn vehicles, the Canadian CN Turbo-Trains, several FLIRT trains, IC3 by Adtranz, the JR Central L0 Series maglev and the Škoda ForCity tram.

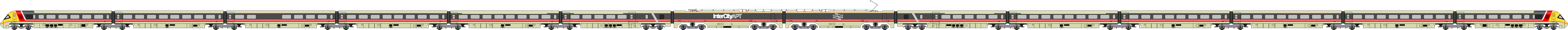
Jacobs bogies under a British Rail Class 370 APT-P

In Australia, Jacobs bogies were first used in 1984–85 on B class Melbourne trams, which were designed to run on two former suburban railways which had been converted to light rail operation.

=== Not a Jacobs bogie ===
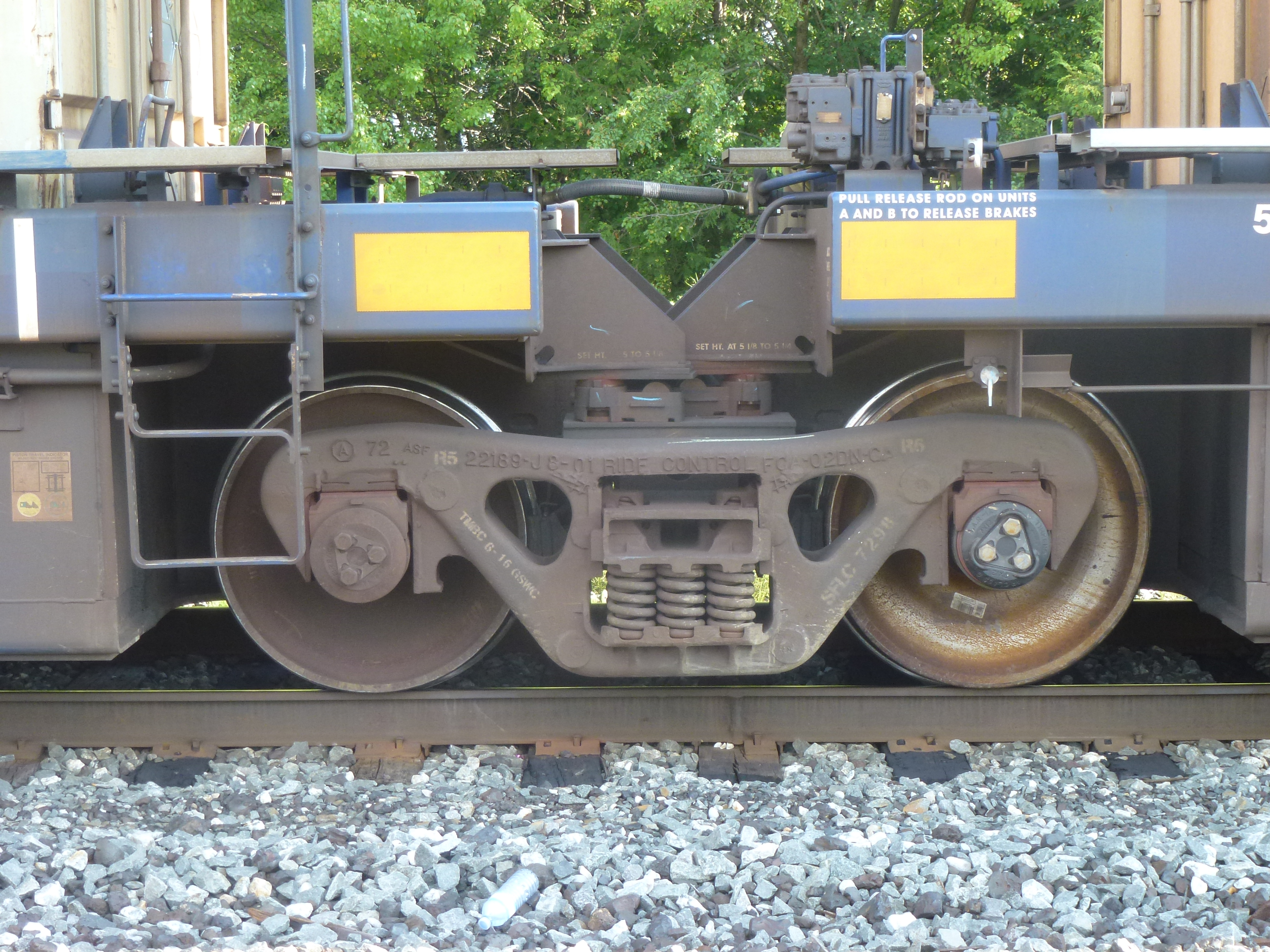

A number of intermodal freight trains, such as the Pacer Stacktrain run by US logistics company XPO, Inc., use container well cars joined in groups of three to five, with four side bearings on top of the bolster of a standard North American bogie between the individual cars.

TGV trains do not use Jacobs bogies either. Whereas with Jacobs bogies each car rests on four body supports (two at each end of the car) that are directly mounted onto the bogie, such is not the case with the TGV. Indeed, the TGV’s intermediate bogie has only two supports, on which only one carriage body rests. The adjacent carriage body does not rest on the bogie, but on a very sturdy hook attached to the rear end of the other car.

== Locomotives ==
Some triple-bogied two-section electric locomotives such as the NZR EW class have an articulated body supported on the centre bogie. Other types of Bo-Bo-Bo locomotives instead use a body shell that has enough allowance for sideplay in the central bogie.

== Tram (streetcar) ==
The Jacobs bogie can be found in trams (streetcars) such as the Tatra K2 and Oslo's SL79. The first 100% low-floor tram with pivoting bogies, the Škoda ForCity, also uses modified Jacobs bogies.

Jacobs bogies under a German DBAG Class 423 S-Bahn EMU

== US interurban trains ==
Drawing of an Electroliner set

On this crossover between the tram (streetcar) and the high-speed train, Jacobs bogies occurred on the latest equipment of any significance, the two Electroliner trains (1941–1976). They were suited for streets with tight curves, the Chicago 'L' and running through the countryside at approximately 140 km/h (87 mph). They served the Chicago–Milwaukee line and later the Philadelphia area.

== Advantages ==
- Safety, because the trains are less prone to collapse like an accordion after derailing. A Eurostar train has been recorded as having derailed at a speed close to 300 km/h (190 mph) with no resultant loss of life or severe injuries among its passengers.
- Lower weight and simpler and cheaper construction because bogies are heavy, expensive, and complex structures.
- Less rail squeal and other wheel-to-rail noise because of fewer bogies.

== Disadvantages ==
- The cars of the vehicle/unit are semi-permanently coupled and can only be separated in the workshop. However, some flexibility may be achieved by coupling two or three units together into one train.
- Fewer bogies and fewer wheelsets mean greater axle loads – if everything else is equal.
- Larger pivot distances for equivalent section length. Each section has to be shorter to provide adequate clearance for the vehicle on the inside of curves. More sections are required for equal capacity compared to a conventional unit.

== Gallery ==
Examples of Jacobs bogies

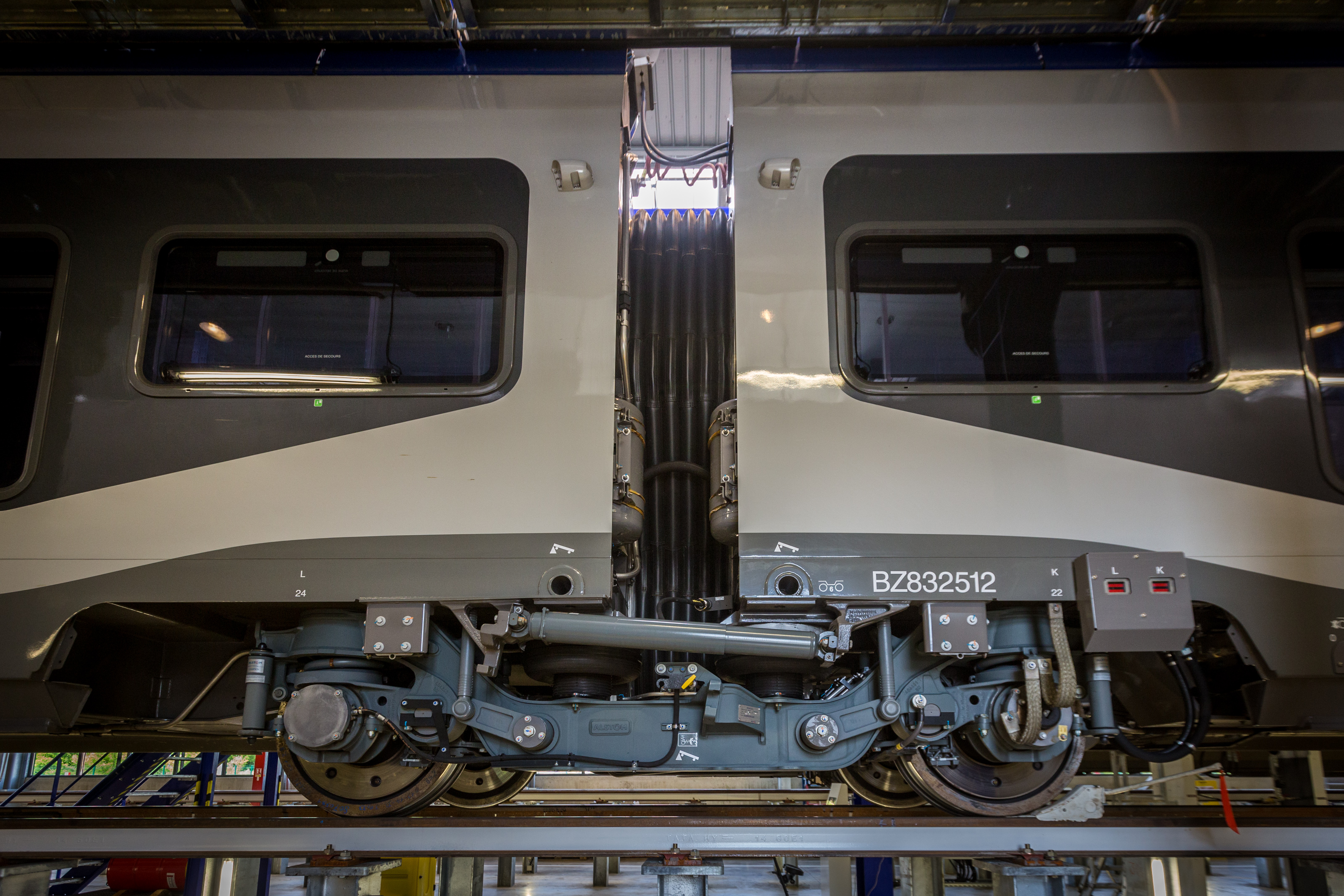
Jacobs bogie on a TER regional train in Alsace, France

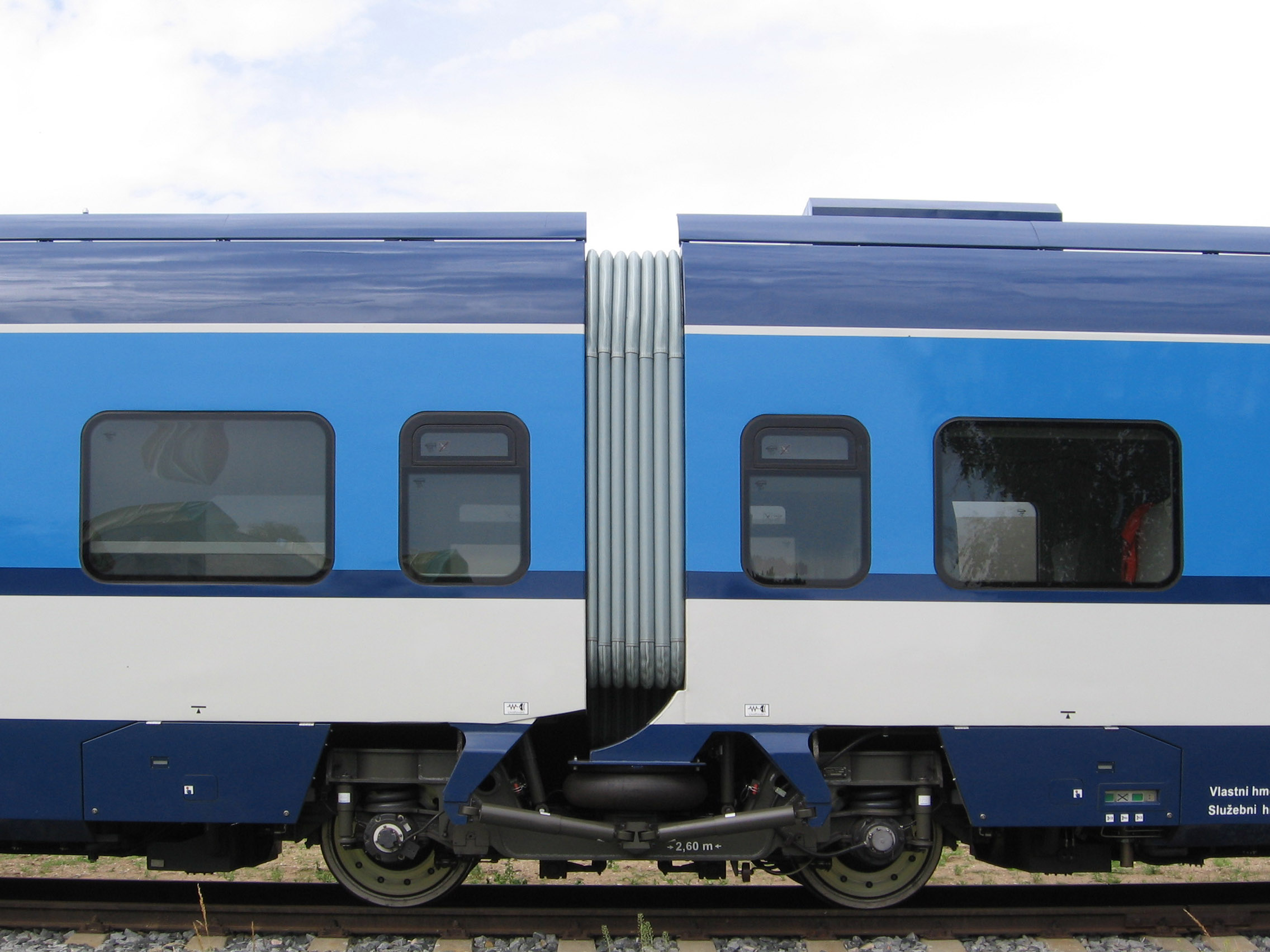
Jakobs bogie on the ČD Class 844/Pesa SA

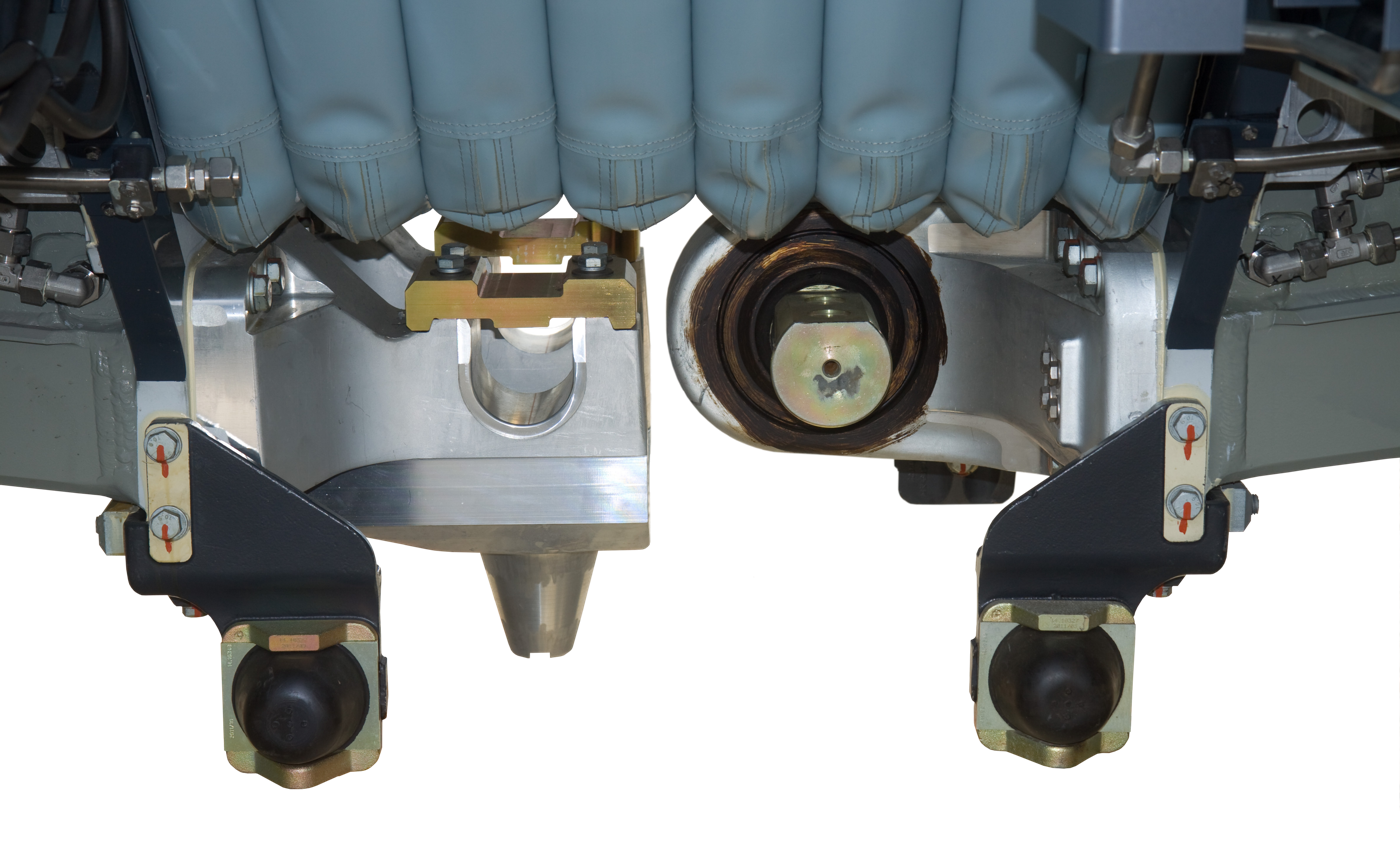
Disassembled joint of a Stadler FLIRT with the bogie removed

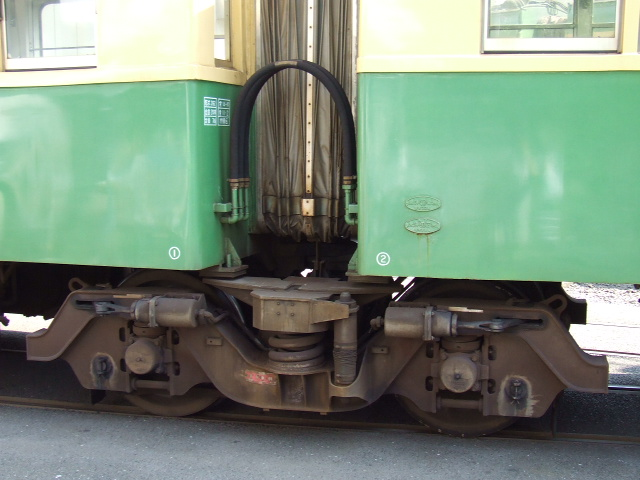
Jacobs bogie on an Enoshima Electric Railway train

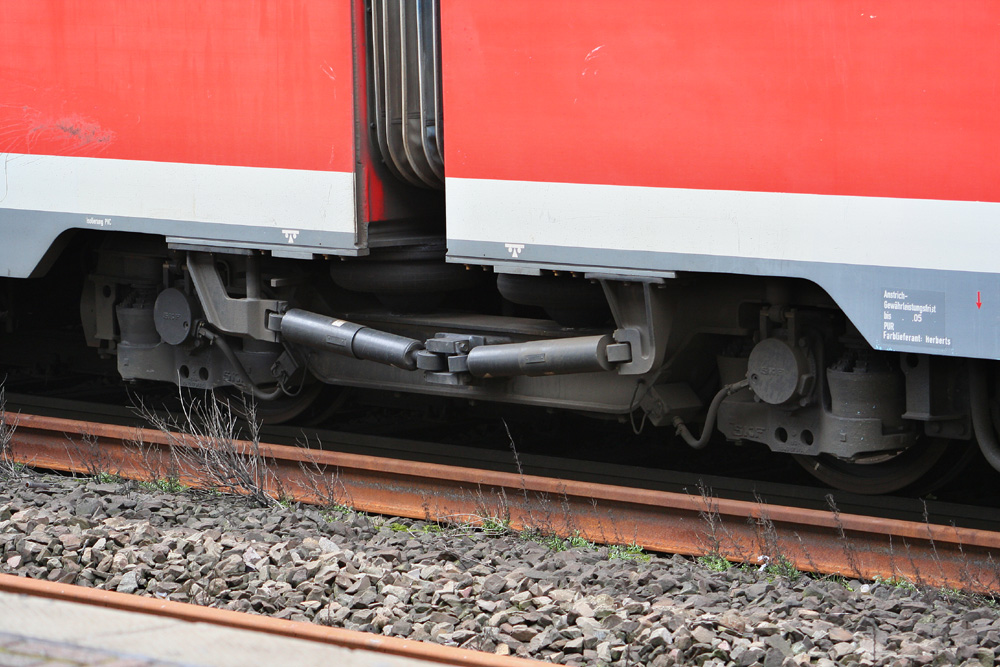
Jacobs bogie on a DBAG Class 425 train

Schema of a Jacobs bogie, shown on the upper half

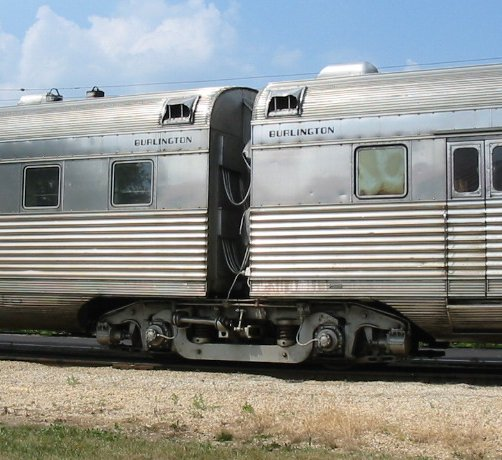
A closeup of a Jacobs bogie on the preserved Nebraska Zephyr trainset

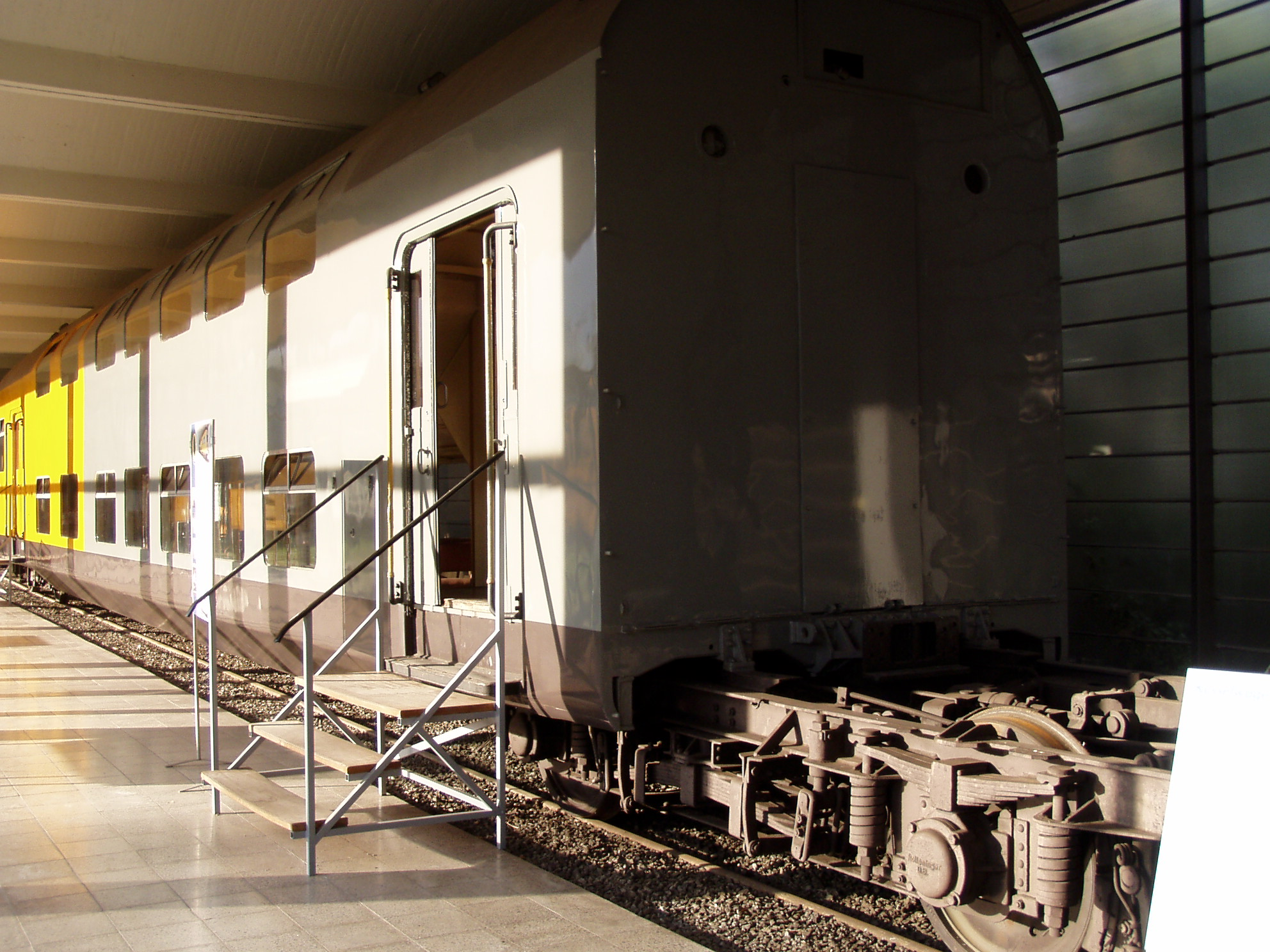
Jakobs bogie on the Doppelstock-Stromlinien-Wendezug of the Lübeck-Büchen Railway Company in 1936
