= Ingenheim derailment =

2020 railway incident in France

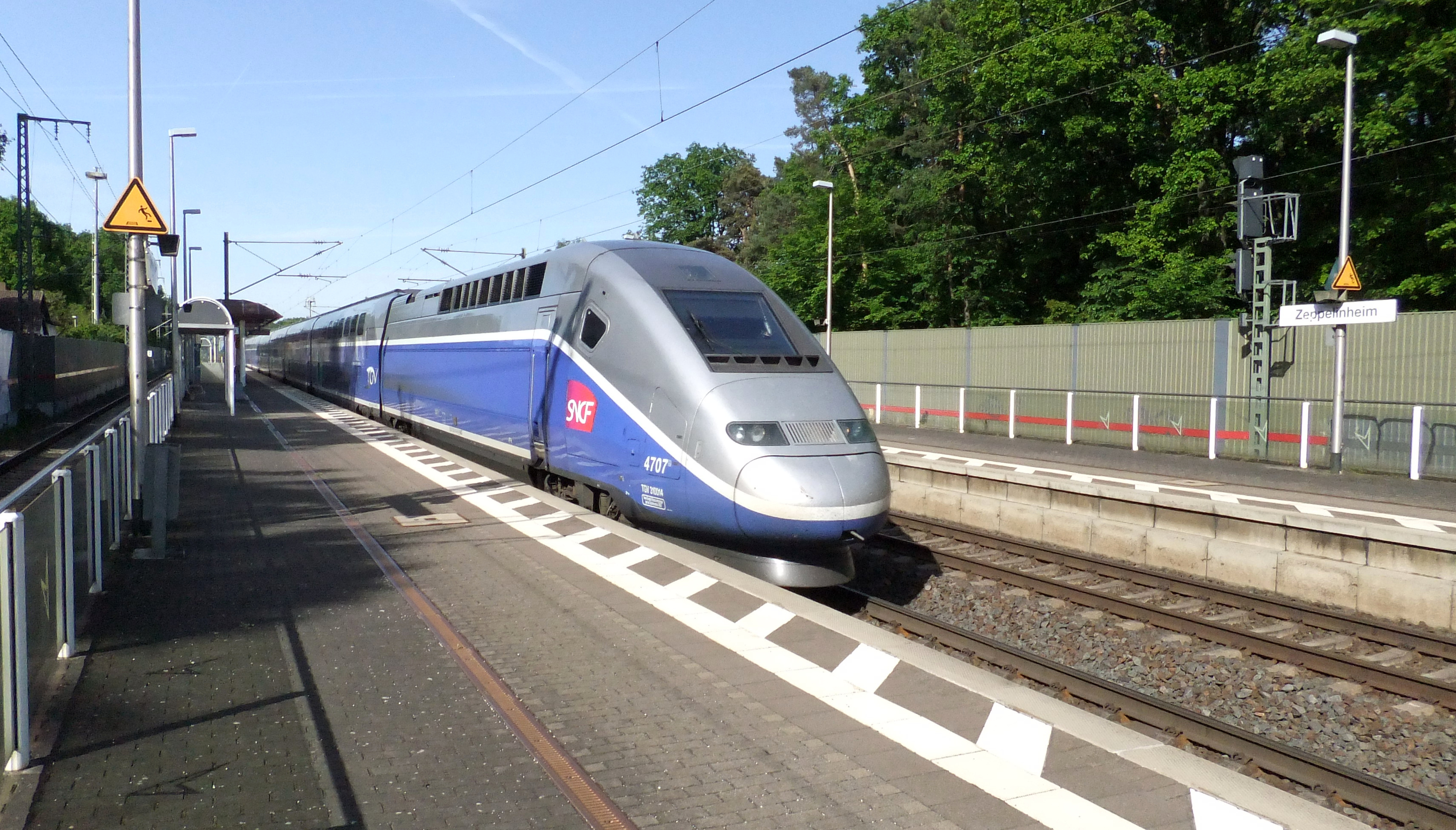
- Euroduplex unit 4707 was the train involved.

Details
- Date: 5 March 2020
- Location: Ingenheim, Bas-Rhin
- Country: France
- Line: LGV Est
- Operator: SNCF
- Service: Colmar-Paris TGV
- Incident type: Derailment
- Cause: Landslip

Statistics
- Trains: 1
- Passengers: 348
- Injured: 22

The Ingenheim derailment occurred on 5 March 2020 when a TGV train derailed near Ingenheim, Bas-Rhin, Grand Est, France, on the LGV Est rail line due to a landslip. Twenty-one of the 348 passengers on board were injured, along with the driver.

== Derailment ==
At 07:45 CET (06:45 UTC), a Colmar-Paris TGV train derailed between Ingenheim and Saessolsheim, Bas-Rhin, France. Euroduplex unit 4707 formed the train involved in the accident. At the time of the derailment, the train was travelling at 270 kilometres per hour (170 mph). The first five vehicles of the train were derailed. The train was carrying 348 passengers. Twenty-two people were injured, including the driver of the train, who was severely injured. He was airlifted to the Haute-Pierre Hospital in Strasbourg. Emergency service response included 102 gendarmes, 99 firefighters and 10 SAMU agents. Passengers were evacuated from the area by bus. The derailment was caused by a landslip in a cutting affecting the track.

The line was closed following the crash and service was diverted. No cancellations of services were made as a result of the crash.

== Investigation ==
The Strasbourg Public Prosecutor's Office opened an investigation into the accident. The Bureau d'Enquêtes sur les Accidents de Transport Terrestre (BEA-TT) is responsible for investigation of railway accidents in France.

== See also ==
- Eckwersheim derailment – 2015 TGV derailment in Bas-Rhin
