= Wilhelm Jakobs =

German railway engineer (1858–1942)

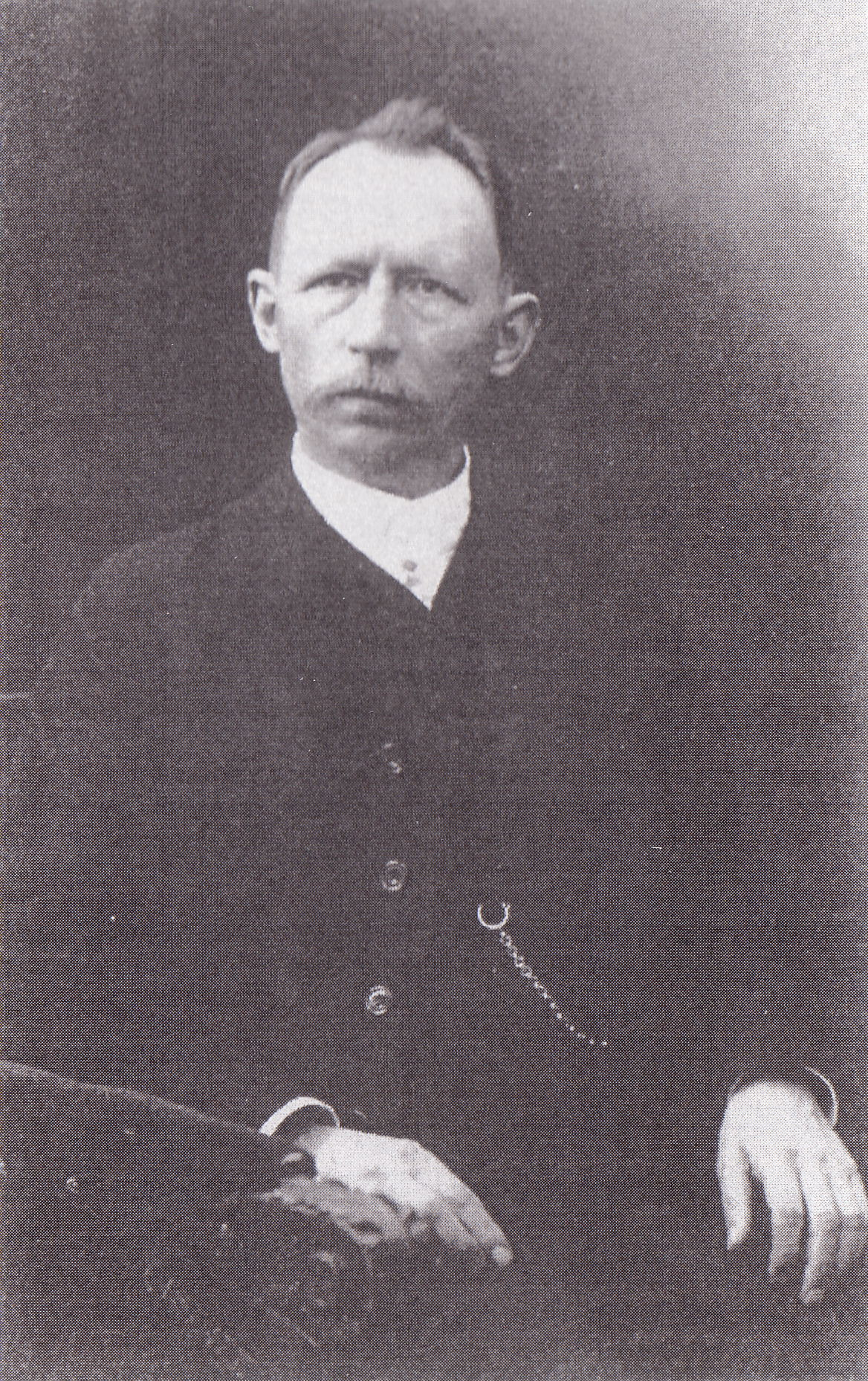
- Wilhelm Jakobs around 1900
- Born: February 10, 1858; Diezenkausen, Germany
- Died: February 3, 1942 (aged 83); Bonn, Nazi Germany

Wilhelm Jakobs (February 10, 1858 – February 3, 1942) was a German railway engineer and construction advisor.

== Life ==
=== Early years and education ===
Wilhelm Jakobs was born on 10 February 1858 in Diezenkausen as the eldest child of Wilhelm Jakobs (1832–1913) and Luise, born Luise Simon. His father, a respected farmer and blacksmith, held public office and was known for his poetic inclinations, earning him the nickname "poet behind the plow" among the foresters.

Wilhelm attended elementary school in Waldbröl and secondary school at the Friedrich-Wilhelm Gymnasium in Cologne, graduating on 17 July 1877. He then enrolled in mechanical engineering at the Berlin Gewerbeakademie (later Technical University) on 9 October 1877. On 22 November 1882, he passed the first state examination for mechanical engineering.

Following his graduation, Wilhelm worked in railroad workshops and completed military service as a one-year volunteer at the railroad regiment. He then focused on locomotive construction in Hanover and passed the locomotive examination between 1886 and 1888. From 16 July 1888 onwards, he worked as a railroad official at the railway directorate in Cologne.

On 28 August 1895, Wilhelm married Else Luyken and established his first household in St. Johann. Together, they had five sons born between 1896 and 1905. In 1896, Wilhelm was called back to Cologne but retired from civil service in 1900 to become the head of the Rastatt wagon factory. On 10 April 1901, the Imperial Patent Office granted him a patent for a "passenger car consisting of several articulated sections, two of which each rest on a common bogie with the ends facing each other." This bogie, known as the Jakobs bogie, was since adopted by numerous railcars and multiple units worldwide. In this construction, two adjacent car body ends of railway vehicles are based on a common bogie from which effort and weight can be saved.

In the spring of 1914, Wilhelm became one of the two managing directors of the Association of German Wagon Factories, which was established in Berlin, and relocated with his family to Berlin-Dahlem.

=== First World War ===
During the onset of the First World War, Wilhelm Jakobs advanced as Captain of the Reserve and Company Leader of the Reserve Railroad Company 9 on the second day of mobilization. In August, he and his company were deployed to Belgium, where they restored the train station in Libramont.

Between September and November 1914, Wilhelm Jakobs oversaw the construction of war railway bridges over the Mesh at Charleville Mezieres, the Scheldt at Ename, and Audenarde. He also restored and put into operation the Sodeghem Kortrijk railway. The train ran from Roeselare to Moorslede and Ypres. By the turn of 1915, the railways between Torhout and Ostend, as well as Thourout and Ypres, were taken over and expanded. At Ostend, heavy guns were positioned in the dunes, and the lighthouse was prepared for blasting. In April 1915, Wilhelm Jakobs led the railway operations during the attack on Ypres and subsequent battles. In July 1915, he was transferred to the 5th Army (Crown Prince Army) and appointed as the chief of the Baudirektion of this army. On 30 November 1915, he was promoted to the rank of major in the reserve.

In the winter of 1915–1916, Wilhelm Jakobs, along with the subordinate tram companies and temporarily assigned troop departments, prepared and maintained supply and attack routes for the attack on Verdun in the area of the 5th Army. He also participated in the repair of locks and the Maas canal after Verdun, which became operational again in the autumn of 1916. During this time, Wilhelm Jakobs received the Iron Cross II and I Class, as well as the Knight's Cross I. However, he was called back from the field to resume his leadership role in the Association of German Wagon Factories due to the increasing need for new railway wagons for the war effort. He participated in the vehicle committee until its dissolution.

The progression of the war filled Wilhelm Jakobs with growing bitterness and anxiety towards the All-German Association and its far-reaching war aims. He supported the emergence of the so-called 1917–18 Fatherland Party. On 28 October 1918, shortly before the monarchy ended, he was awarded the honorific title of "Royal Building Council." After his death, he remained in the memory of the people in Waldbröler as the "Jakob's Building Council."

The lost war, the revolution, and the Versailles Treaty deeply shook Wilhelm Jakobs. In December 1918, he participated in the founding of the German National People's Party and ran for office in parliamentary elections but did not gain a seat. In March 1921, the Association of German Wagon Factories was dissolved and replaced by the Association of German Wagon Factories, which was also later dissolved in October 1923. Wilhelm Jakobs was forced to retire at the age of 65, but took some solace in the 1920s production based on his invention, the Jakob joint car.

=== Death ===
In October 1926, Wilhelm Jakobs sold his house in Berlin-Dahlen and relocated with his wife to Bensheim an der Bergstraße. The two subsequently moved back to his hometown of Diezenkausen in 1931. In 1939, at the age of 80, Wilhelm Jakobs sold his house in Diezenkausen and moved with his wife to a pension in Bonn. He died of a stroke on 3 February 1942.
