= Henry Wolf (engraver) =

American wood engraver (1852–1916)

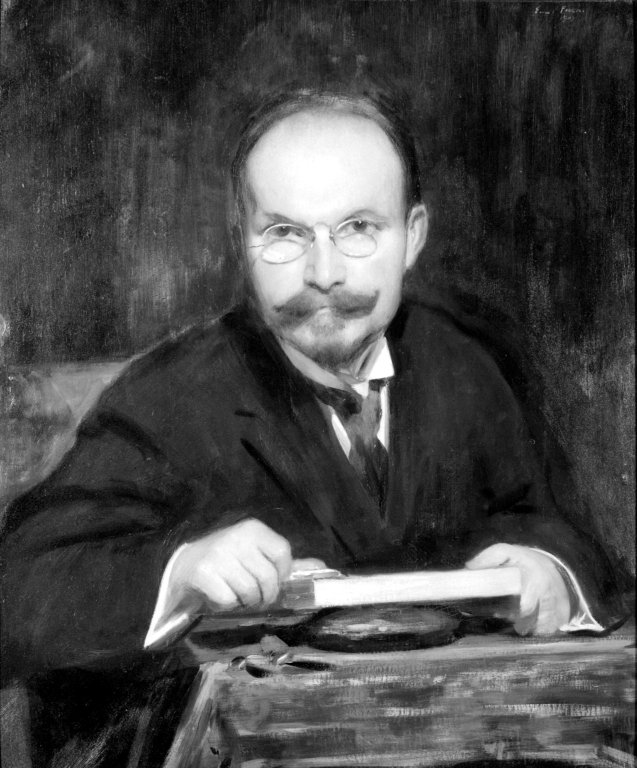
- Henry Wolf, circa 1907, portrait by Emil Fuchs.
- Born: Henry Wolf; 1852; Eckwersheim, Alsace, France
- Died: 1916 (aged 63–64); New York, New York, United States
- Education: Jacques Levy (Strasbourg, France)
- Known for: Wood engraving
- Notable work: Canal in Artois (1896), Miss Frances Cadwalader (Lady Erskine) (1897), Louis Stern (1905), By the River (1910), Boy with the Torn Hat (1915).
- Awards: Panama–Pacific International Exposition Grand Prize in Printmaking, San Francisco, 1915.
- Patrons: Harper's Monthly, The Century Magazine, Lippincott's Monthly Magazine, Scribner's Magazine, St. Nicholas Magazine.

Henry Wolf (1852–1916) was a French-born wood engraver who lived and worked in the United States during his most influential work period and until his death.

Henry Wolf was born on August 3, 1852, in Eckwersheim, France. He lived in Strasbourg and studied under Jacques Levy and exhibited in Paris. Henry Wolf moved to New York City in 1871, where he created wood engravings of works by Gilbert Stuart, Enric Serra Auqué, Frank Weston Benson, Howard Pyle, Henry Salem Hubbell, John Singer Sargent, A. B. Frost, Jan Vermeer, Jean-Léon Gérôme, Aimé Morot and Édouard Manet. Many of his engravings were published in Scribner's Magazine,, Harper's Monthly, and Century Magazine. In 1896 he started engraving his own artwork. He exhibited 144 wood engravings at the 1915 Panama-Pacific International Exposition in San Francisco. He was awarded the Exposition's Grand Prize in printmaking that year. He died in home in New York City on March 18, 1916. His works are held in the collection of the Smithsonian American Art Museum, the Metropolitan Museum of Art, and the Canton Museum of Art.
