= Baudrecourt, Moselle =

Baudrecourt
- Commune
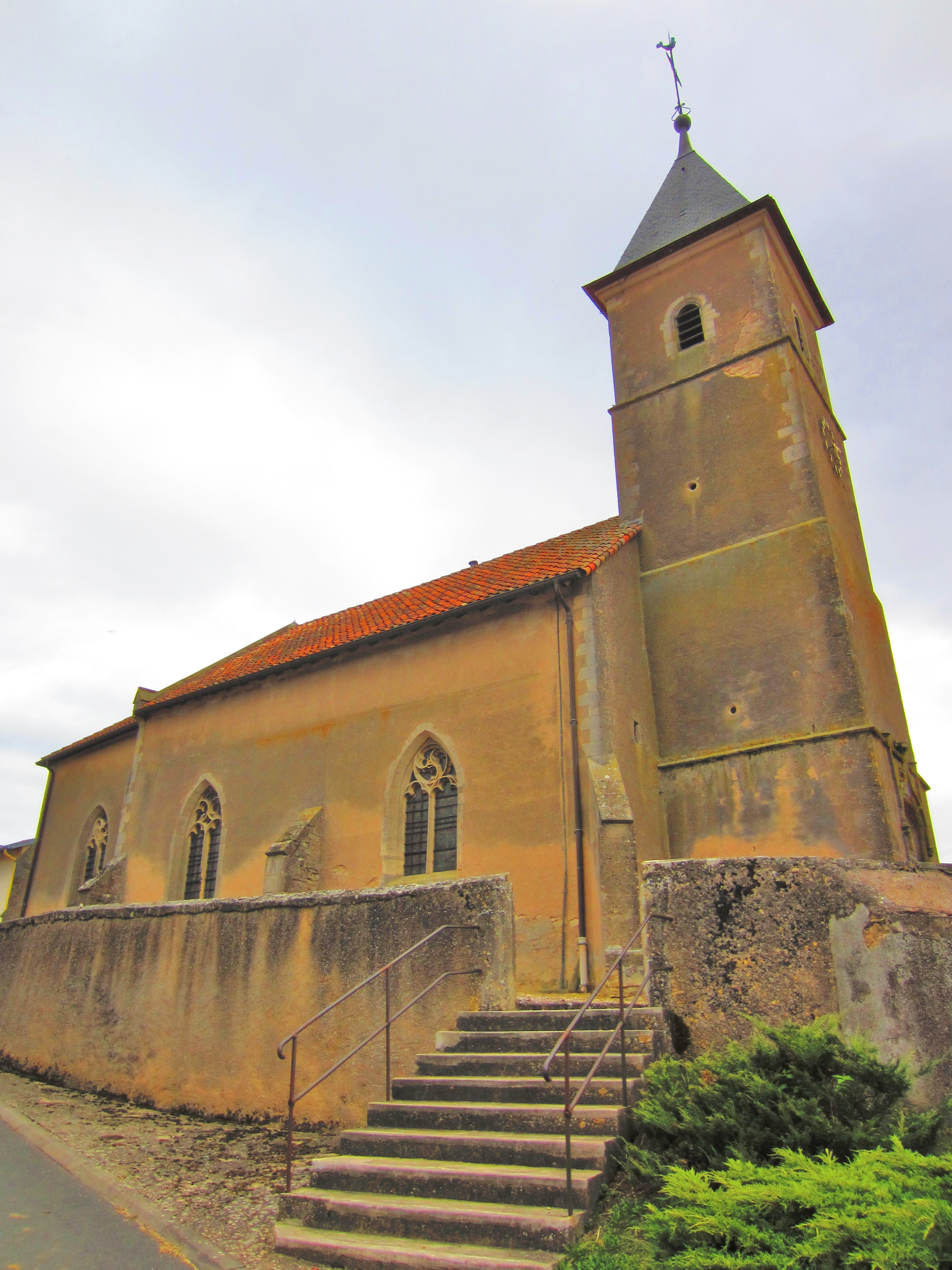
- The church in Baudrecourt

- Coat of arms
- Location of Baudrecourt
- Location within France Location within Grand Est
- Coordinates: 48°57′50″N 6°27′09″E
- Country: France
- Region: Grand Est
- Department: Moselle
- Arrondissement: Sarrebourg-Château-Salins
- Canton: Le Saulnois
- Intercommunality: CC Saulnois

Government
  - Mayor (2020–2026): Martine Bize
- Area^{1}: 5.07 km^{2} (1.96 sq mi)
- Elevation: 270 m (890 ft)
- Highest elevation: 271 m (889 ft)
- Lowest elevation: 224 m (735 ft)
- Population (2023): 173
  - Density: 34.1/km^{2} (88.4/sq mi)
- Time zone: UTC+01:00 (CET)
  - Summer (DST): UTC+02:00 (CEST)
- INSEE/Postal code: 57054 /57580
- ^{1} French Land Register data, which excludes lakes, ponds, glaciers > 1 km^{2} (0.386 sq mi or 247 acres) and river estuaries.

Baudrecourt (French pronunciation: [bodʁəkuʁ]; German: Baldershofen from 1915 to 1918, before Baudrecourt) is a commune in the Moselle department in Grand Est in northeastern France.

Situated between Nancy and Metz, it is the terminus of the first phase of the LGV Est train line connecting Paris to Strasbourg.

== Population ==
Historical population
Year	Pop.	±% p.a.
1968	151	—
1975	143	−0.77%
1982	157	+1.34%
1990	164	+0.55%
1999	172	+0.53%
2007	178	+0.43%
2012	187	+0.99%
2017	186	−0.11%
2023	173	−1.20%
Source: INSEE

== See also ==
- Communes of the Moselle department
