= Denguin rail crash =

2014 public transit disaster near Denguin, Pyrénées-Atlantiques, France

Details
- Date: 17 July 2014; 17:38 CEST (15:38 UTC)
- Location: Denguin, Pyrénées-Atlantiques
- Country: France
- Line: Pau–Bayonne
- Operator: SNCF and TER
- Incident type: Rear-end collision
- Cause: Under investigation, suspected SPAD

Statistics
- Trains: 2
- Passengers: 238
- Injured: 40 (4 seriously)

The Denguin rail crash occurred on 17 July 2014 when a TER passenger train collided with a SNCF TGV express train near Denguin, Pyrénées-Atlantiques, France. Forty people were injured, four seriously.

== Accident ==
A high-speed TGV train on the Pau–Bayonne line was transporting 178 people when a regional TER train carrying 60 passengers crashed into it near the town of Denguin. Nine people have been reported to be seriously injured.

The TGV was travelling from Tarbes, Hautes-Pyrénées to Paris. The TGV was reported to have come to a halt at a red signal near Denguin before proceeding under caution. At 17:38 CEST (15:38 UTC), the TER train ran into the TGV, which was then travelling at 30 kilometres per hour (19 mph). The TER train was travelling at 90 kilometres per hour (56 mph) at the time of the collision. Forty people were injured, four seriously. The driver of the TER train was amongst those seriously injured. There were 170 passengers on the TGV and 70 on the TER train. Three of the injured were evacuated from the crash site by helicopter. By the afternoon of 18 July, two people remained in hospital with injuries described as "not life threatening".

Secretary of State for Transport, Marine and Fisheries Frédéric Cuvillier stated that signals were under maintenance at the time. Whether or not this was a causal factor in the accident would be part of the investigation. SNCF refuted suggestions that high temperatures had caused the TGV to suddenly slow. It is thought that the TER train received a green signal and had no warning of the TGV ahead until it came in sight. The TER train had been travelling at 120 kilometres per hour (75 mph) before the collision.

== Investigation ==
The French Land Transport Accident Investigation Bureau (BEA-TT) have opened an investigation into the accident. A separate criminal investigation was also opened, as was an internal investigation by SNCF.
