= Vendenheim =

- Commune
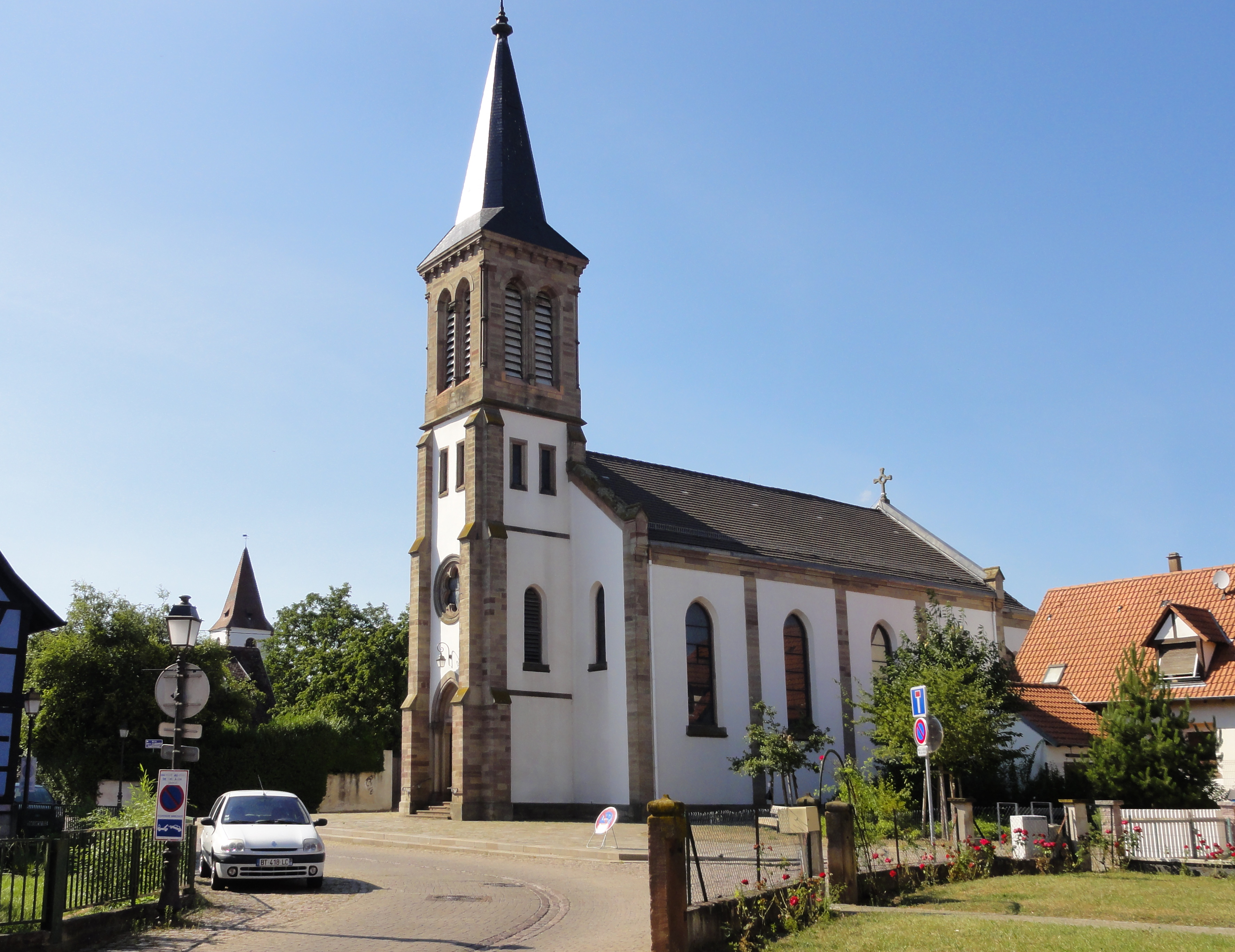
- The church in Vendenheim

- Coat of arms
- Location of Vendenheim
- Location within France Location within Grand Est
- Coordinates: 48°40′06″N 7°42′50″E
- Country: France
- Region: Grand Est
- Department: Bas-Rhin
- Arrondissement: Strasbourg
- Canton: Brumath
- Intercommunality: Strasbourg Eurométropole

Government
  - Mayor (2020–2026): Philippe Pfrimmer
- Area^{1}: 15.89 km^{2} (6.14 sq mi)
- Elevation: 150 m (490 ft)
- Highest elevation: 181 m (594 ft)
- Lowest elevation: 131 m (430 ft)
- Population (2023): 6,137
  - Density: 386.2/km^{2} (1,000/sq mi)
- Time zone: UTC+01:00 (CET)
  - Summer (DST): UTC+02:00 (CEST)
- INSEE/Postal code: 67506 /67550
- ^{1} French Land Register data, which excludes lakes, ponds, glaciers > 1 km^{2} (0.386 sq mi or 247 acres) and river estuaries.

Vendenheim (French pronunciation: [vɛndənaim]; Alemannic: Vangene, Alsatian: Fangene) is a commune in the Bas-Rhin department, Alsace, administrative region of Grand Est, northeastern France. It has been the eastern terminus of the LGV Est high-speed rail from Paris to Strasbourg since 2016.

== Population ==
Historical population
Year	Pop.	±% p.a.
1968	2,772	—
1975	3,457	+3.21%
1982	3,520	+0.26%
1990	5,193	+4.98%
1999	5,597	+0.84%
2007	5,646	+0.11%
2012	5,548	−0.35%
2017	5,664	+0.41%
2023	6,137	+1.35%
Source: INSEE

== See also ==
- Communes of the Bas-Rhin department
