= Eckwersheim =

- Commune
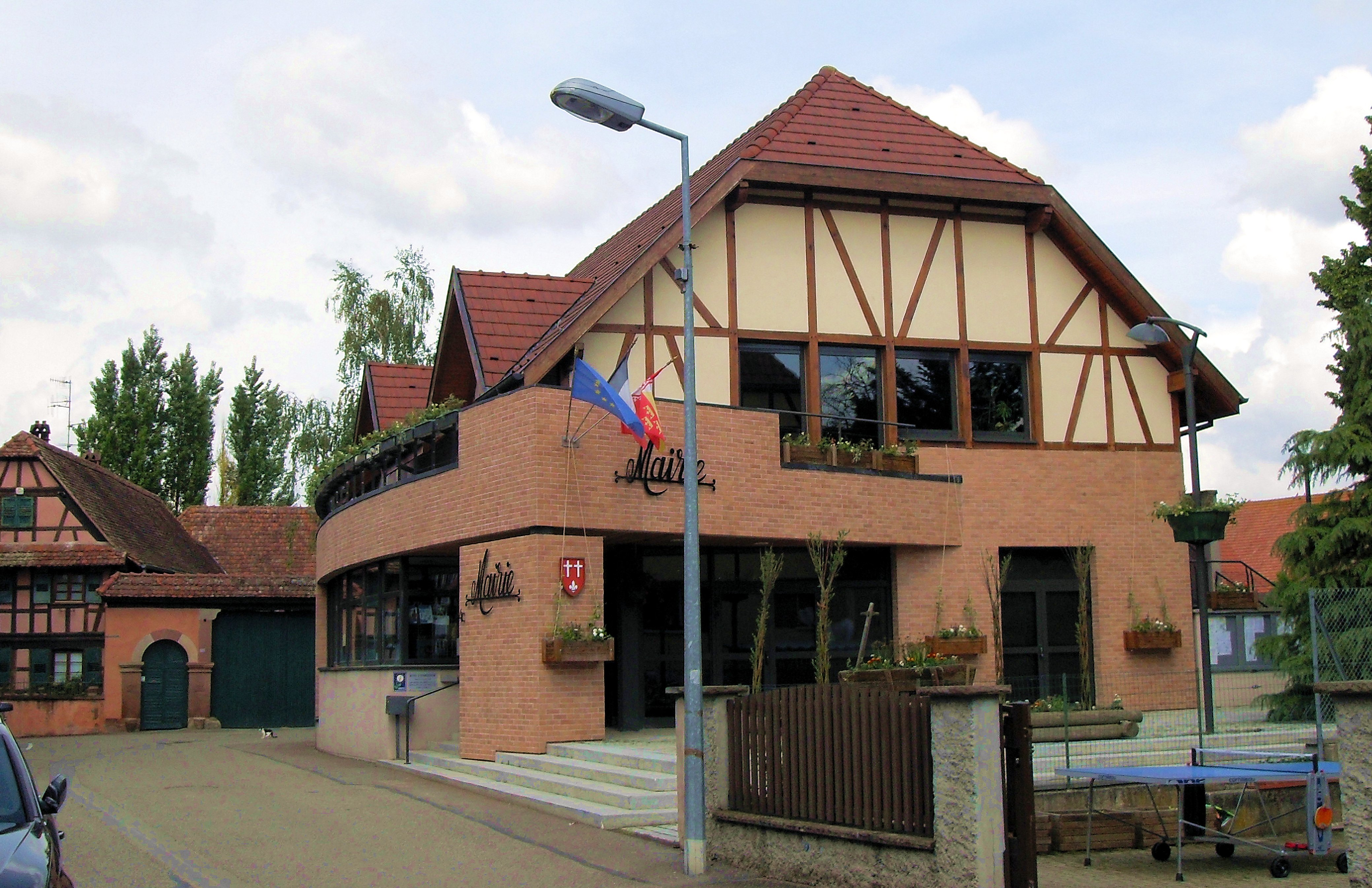
- The town hall in Eckwersheim

- Coat of arms
- Location of Eckwersheim
- Location within France Location within Grand Est
- Coordinates: 48°40′55″N 7°41′42″E
- Country: France
- Region: Grand Est
- Department: Bas-Rhin
- Arrondissement: Strasbourg
- Canton: Brumath
- Intercommunality: Strasbourg Eurométropole

Government
  - Mayor (2020–2026): Camille Bader
- Area^{1}: 7.46 km^{2} (2.88 sq mi)
- Highest elevation: 183 m (600 ft)
- Lowest elevation: 139 m (456 ft)
- Population (2023): 1,419
  - Density: 190/km^{2} (493/sq mi)
- Time zone: UTC+01:00 (CET)
  - Summer (DST): UTC+02:00 (CEST)
- INSEE/Postal code: 67119 /67550
- ^{1} French Land Register data, which excludes lakes, ponds, glaciers > 1 km^{2} (0.386 sq mi or 247 acres) and river estuaries.

Eckwersheim is a commune, in the Bas-Rhin department in Grand Est in north-eastern France. It is around 11 km (7 mi) north of Strasbourg.

On 14 November 2015 the commune was the location of a derailment during testing of a TGV train along the LGV Est high-speed rail line. Eleven people were killed and 42 others were injured after the train caught fire and plunged into the Marne–Rhine Canal.

== Notable people ==
Engraver Henry Wolf was born in Eckwersheim, only to eventually live and die in New York City.

== See also ==
- Communes of the Bas-Rhin department
