= Denguin =

- Commune
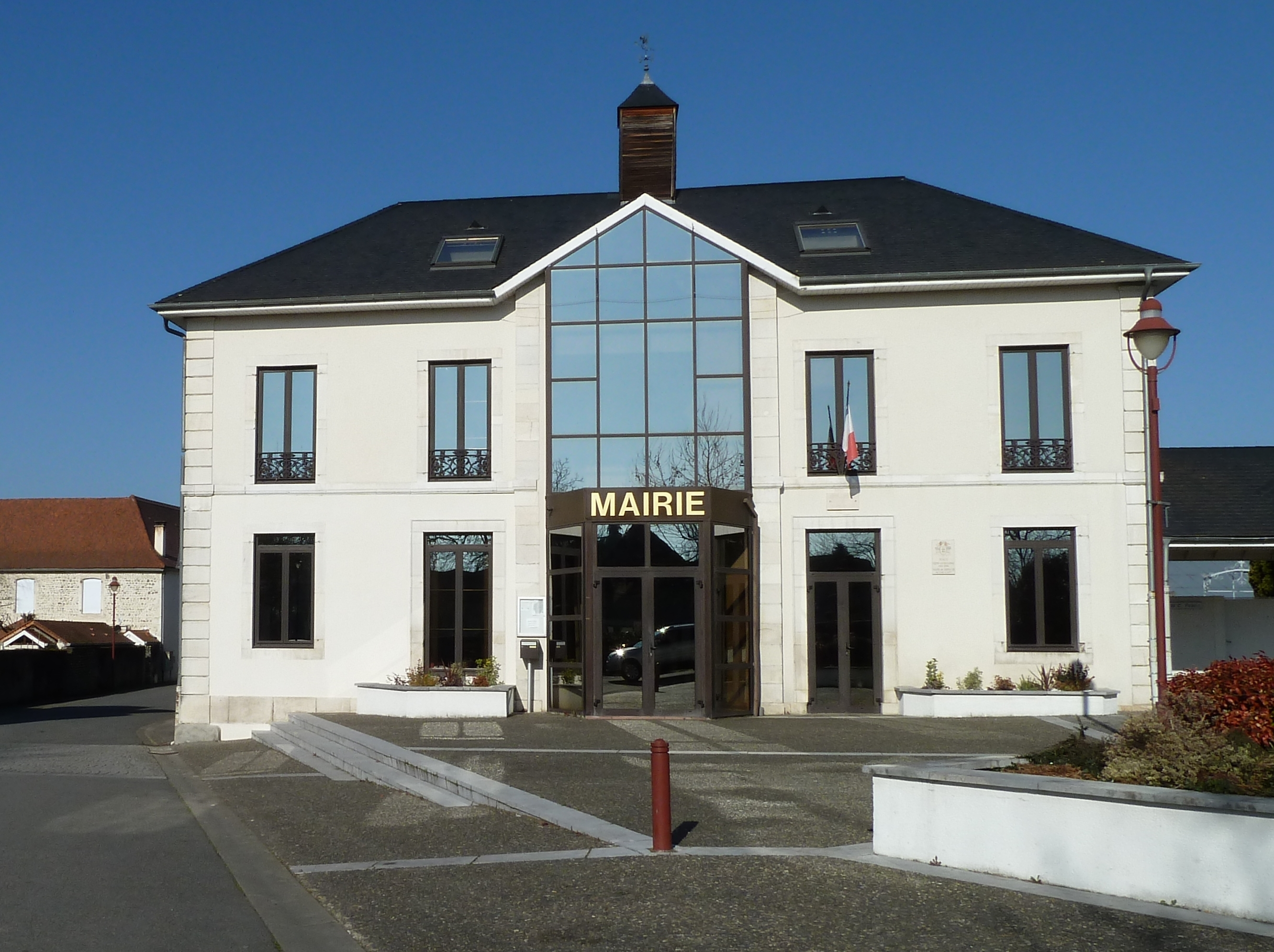
- The town hall

- Coat of arms
- Location of Denguin
- Location within France Location within Nouvelle-Aquitaine
- Coordinates: 43°21′47″N 0°30′25″W
- Country: France
- Region: Nouvelle-Aquitaine
- Department: Pyrénées-Atlantiques
- Arrondissement: Pau
- Canton: Artix et Pays de Soubestre
- Intercommunality: CA Pau Béarn Pyrénées

Government
  - Mayor (2020–2026): Gilles Tesson
- Area^{1}: 12.29 km^{2} (4.75 sq mi)
- Elevation: 141 m (463 ft)
- Highest elevation: 271 m (889 ft)
- Lowest elevation: 120 m (390 ft)
- Population (2023): 1,765
  - Density: 143.6/km^{2} (372.0/sq mi)
- Time zone: UTC+01:00 (CET)
  - Summer (DST): UTC+02:00 (CEST)
- INSEE/Postal code: 64198 /64230
- ^{1} French Land Register data, which excludes lakes, ponds, glaciers > 1 km^{2} (0.386 sq mi or 247 acres) and river estuaries.

Denguin (French pronunciation: [dɑ̃ɡɛ̃]) is a commune in the Pyrénées-Atlantiques department, southwestern France. It is located 14 km from Pau, Pyrenees-Atlantiques, the prefecture of the department. It is part of the historical province of Béarn.

== See also ==
- Communes of the Pyrénées-Atlantiques department
