= LGV Est =

French high-speed railway

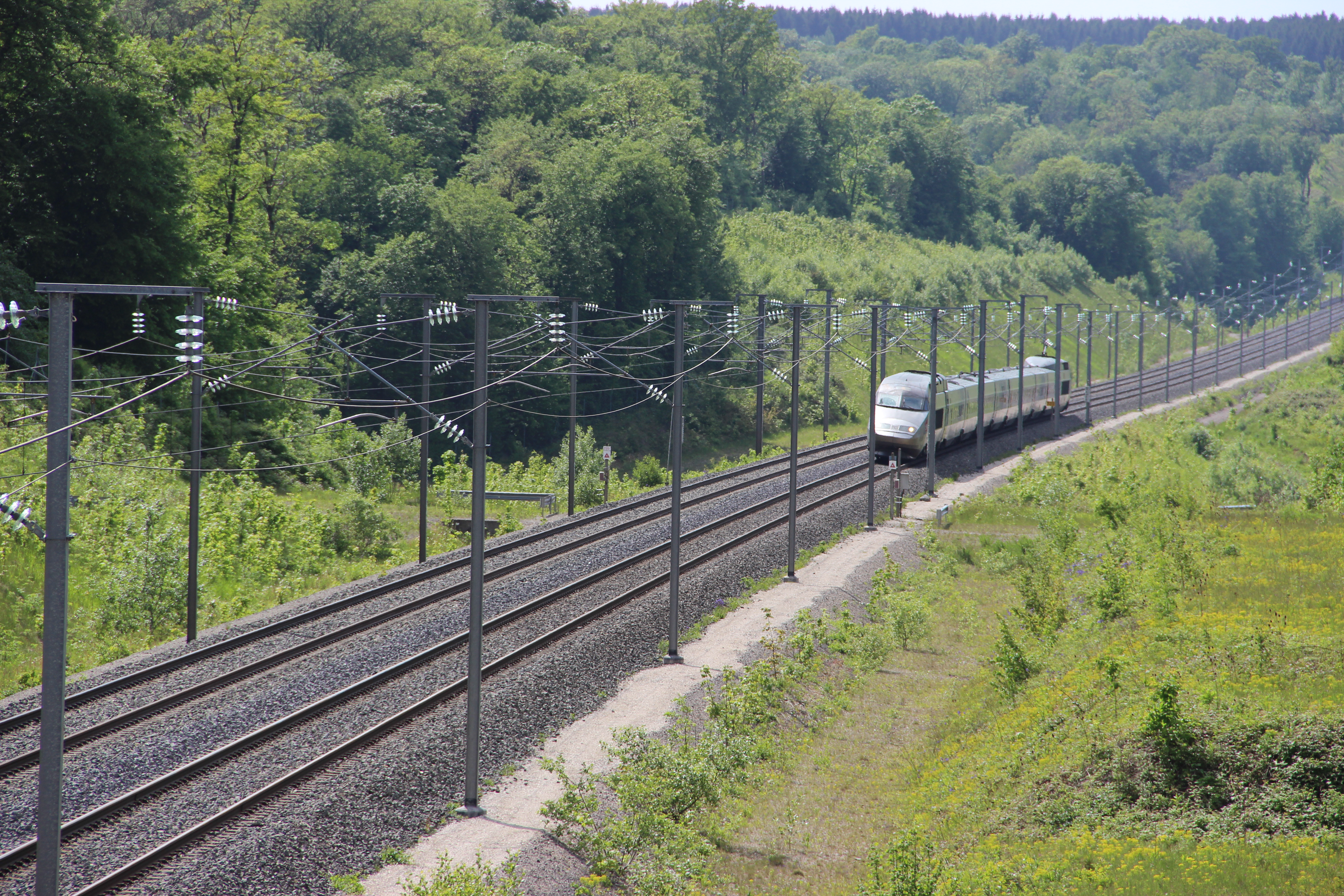
- The line in Rambluzin-et-Benoite-Vaux, Meuse

Overview
- Status: Operational
- Owner: SNCF Réseau
- Locale: Île-de-France and Grand Est, France
- Termini: Vaires-sur-Marne, Île-de-France; Vendenheim, Grand Est
- Stations: 3

Service
- Type: High-speed rail
- System: SNCF
- Operator: SNCF

History
- Opened: Phase 1: 10 June 2007; Phase 2: 3 July 2016

Technical
- Line length: 406 km (252 mi)
- Num of tracks: Double track
- Track gauge: 1,435 mm (4 ft 8 1/2 in) standard gauge
- Electrification: 25 kV 50 Hz
- Operating speed: 320 km/h (200 mph)
- Signalling: TVM-430, ETCS Level 2

The Ligne à Grande Vitesse Est européenne (East European High Speed Line), typically shortened to LGV Est, is a French high-speed rail line that connects Vaires-sur-Marne (near Paris) and Vendenheim (near Strasbourg). The line halved the travel time between Paris and Strasbourg and provides fast services between Paris and the principal cities of Eastern France as well as Luxembourg and Germany. The LGV Est is a segment of the Main Line for Europe project to connect Paris with Budapest with high-speed rail service.

The line was built in two phases. Construction on the 300 km (190 mi) from Vaires-sur-Marne to Baudrecourt (near Metz and Nancy) began in 2004; the first phase entered into service in June 2007. Construction on the 106 km (66 mi) second phase from Baudrecourt to Vendenheim began in June 2010; the second phase opened to commercial service on 3 July 2016. Opening of the second phase was delayed after a train derailed near Eckwersheim on 14 November 2015 during commissioning trials, resulting in 11 deaths.

A specially modified train performed a series of high-speed tests on the first phase of the LGV Est prior to its opening. In April 2007, it reached a top speed of 574.8 km/h (159.6 m/s, 357.2 mph), becoming the world's fastest conventional rail vehicle and fastest passenger train on a main line (as opposed to dedicated test track).

== Route ==
The line passes through the French regions of Île-de-France and Grand Est. The first 300 km (190 mi) section of this new route, linking Vaires-sur-Marne near Paris to Baudrecourt in the Moselle, opened on 10 June 2007. Constructed for speeds up to 350 km/h (220 mph), for commercial service it is initially operating at a maximum speed of 320 km/h (200 mph), and was the fastest service in the world at average speed of 279.3 km/h (173.5 mph) between Lorraine and Champagne until the Wuhan–Guangzhou High-Speed Railway opened in 2009. It is the first line in France to travel at this maximum speed in commercial service, the first in France to use ERTMS, the new European rail signalling system and the first line also served by German ICE trains. The second phase includes the 4,200-metre (13,800 ft) Saverne Tunnel. The signalling centre for the line is at Pagny-sur-Moselle.

== History ==
=== Early proposals and planning ===
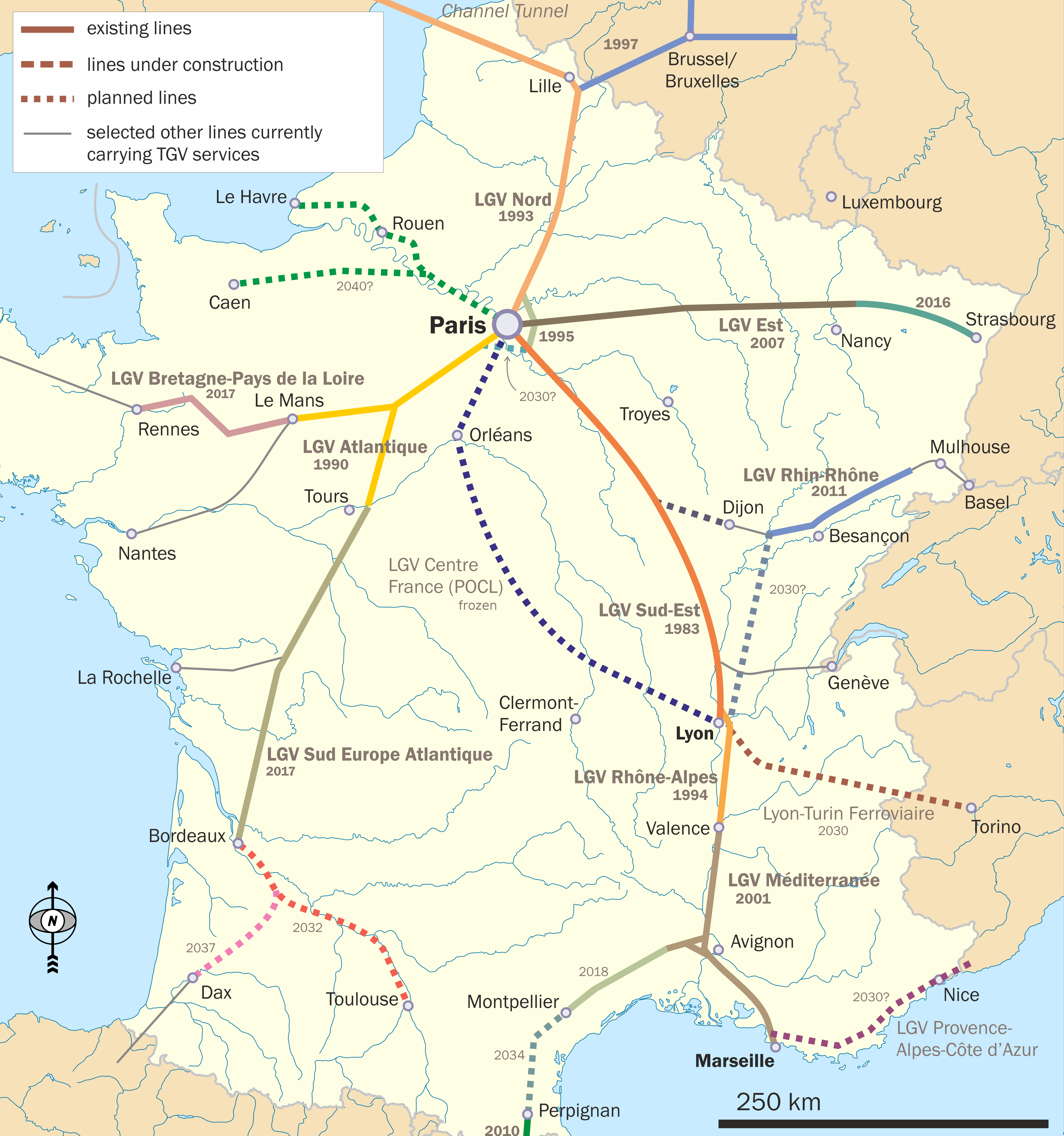
French TGV network, with the LGV Est in brown running east from Paris

In 1969, Metz politician Raymond Mondon requested a study of a fast train from Paris to Strasbourg along the route of the planned A4 autoroute. In 1970–71, the International Union of Railways (UIC, based on its French acronym) developed a master plan of fast intercity connections in continental Europe. Its connection between Paris and Strasbourg was very similar to the route of the LGV Est. The UIC master plan called for this line to be constructed shortly after Paris-Lyon and Paris-Brussels lines. In 1974, the director of SNCF confirmed that the company wanted to follow the UIC master plan.

Germany, which was developing the Transrapid maglev system, was long reserved about the TGV system being developed by France. A 1975 study concluded that the passenger traffic to only Alsace and Lorraine would not be enough for the financial feasibility of the line. In 1982, recognizing German reluctance to extend the line into Germany, SNCF president André Chadeau announced that the company would not build the LGV Est without government subsidies. The following year, Saverne engineer Charles Maetz convinced MPs Adrien Zeller and François Grussenmeyer to establish the East European TGV Association (French: l'Association TGV Est-Européen), which managed to bring together local authorities to support the project.

The LGV Est is a direct result of a project begun in 1985 with the establishment of a working group chaired by Claude Rattier and later by Philippe Essig. Their report provided the basis for preliminary design studies conducted in 1992–93. The initial 1980s plan extended along a corridor from Paris to Munich. However, the expected passenger traffic along this corridor was quite low, unlike Paris-Lyon and Paris-Brussels/London corridors, and a direct route crossed a region of eastern France far from any major urban area.

In 1986, MP Marc Reymann submitted to the government a route that shared a common trunk line between the LGV Nord and LGV Est from Paris, through Charles de Gaulle Airport, to Soissons before forking into lines to Brussels (LGV Nord) and Strasbourg (LGV Est). In 1988, the German government agreed to a rail line from Paris to Frankfurt via Saarbrücken.

The following year, Philippe Essig presented the route that would later be built and at the same time addressed the other problem: financing. This route, further north than previous proposals, served Reims and Strasbourg.

Financing of this proposal called for contributions from local governments—a first in France for construction of a high-speed line—and the Grand Duchy of Luxembourg. This was a favorable financial arrangement for SNCF due to low ridership projections and because the population of the towns served were below a threshold for building a high-speed line. The complexity of financing resulted in the long delay of the project. Under the government of Pierre Bérégovoy (French Prime Minister from 1992 to 1993), the government refused to contribute more than 25 billion francs to the project, and limited the route to Baudrecourt, to which the Alsace region threatened to withdraw its financial contribution to the project. After long delays under the successive governments, all wanting to limit the cost of the project, a two-phase project was finally accepted by all parties, provided that commitments were made for the quick completion of the second phase.

=== Approval and launch of the project ===
On 1 April 1992, the project was added to the master plan of high-speed lines, in which it was classified as a priority project. On 22 May 1992, France and Germany agreed to a Franco-German high-speed line consisting of a northern branch through Saarbrücken and Mannheim and a southern branch through Strasbourg and Karlsruhe. The same year a similar memorandum of understanding was signed between the transport ministers of France and Luxembourg. At the European Council meeting in Essen in 1994, the LGV Est project was reaffirmed as a priority trans-European transport project.

The expected socio-economic benefits of the LGV project was lower than other ongoing high-speed rail projects: LGV Bretagne-Pays de la Loire and LGV Bordeaux–Toulouse. The line is redundant to three existing rail lines: Paris to Strasbourg, Paris to Mulhouse, and the combined Ligne de Trilport à Bazoches and Reims-Metz lines. Additionally, the international potential of the planned line seemed low, as Germany had little interest in the development of high-speed lines, favored domestic north–south axes, and due to the competition between SNCF and Deutsche Bahn.

The decision to build the line is politically motivated by fostering European integration, serving the European institutions in Strasbourg, and geographical balance of French high-speed rail lines, following the construction of high-speed lines from Paris to the southeast (LGV Sud-Est, LGV Rhône-Alpes, & LGV Méditerranée), the southwest (LGV Atlantique), and north (LGV Nord).

A public inquiry was conducted in 1994. The following year, a report conducted at the request of the Transport Minister advocated a complete redesign of the project, with an endpoint of the line at Épernay and from there onwards the adaptation of the existing Paris-Strasbourg line to accommodate high-speed tilting trains. In Nancy, which this route favored, this route was championed locally by Gérard Lignac, director of the L'Est Républicain newspaper. Although a budget was not completed and the planned phasing of the project was opposed by Lorraine and Alsace, the déclaration d'utilité publique was signed on 14 May 1996, two days before the deadline after which a new public inquiry would have been required.

A protocol for the construction and financing of the LGV Est was signed between the national government, RFF, SNCF, and local governments. The financing agreement for the first phase of the line from Vaires-sur-Marne to Baudrecourt was signed on 7 December 2000 between the numerous partners in the project, including 17 local governments. On 18 December 2003, the Jean-Pierre Raffarin government announced that it would proceed with several TGV projects, including construction of the second phase of the LGV Est, which would begin in 2010. On 24 January 2007, the financial arrangements for studies and preparatory work for the second phase of the line from Baudrecourt to Strasbourg was signed.

=== Construction ===
Construction of the line was divided into two phases. The first phase traverses 300 km (190 mi) of relatively flat land from Vaires-sur-Marne (20 km (12 mi) east of Paris) to Baudrecourt (between Metz and Nancy), where it intersects the Metz–Saarbrücken and Paris-Strasbourg rail lines. Construction on the first phase began in 2002 and it entered into service on 10 June 2007. Until the completion of the second phase, TGV trains continued from here towards Strasbourg on the older (lower-speed) existing Paris-Strasbourg track. The second phase traversed 106 km (66 mi) of rougher terrain from Baudrecourt to Vendenheim, on the northern edge of the Strasbourg metropolitan area. Construction on the second phase began in August 2010 and it opened on 3 July 2016.

Between the opening of the first and second phases, trains from Strasbourg, Colmar, and southern Germany travelled along the classic Paris-Strasbourg line until Réding, then the Réding–Metz railway to join the LGV Est at Baudrecourt. However, trains from Nancy and Sarrebourg traveled along the Paris-Strasbourg line until Frouard, then took the Frouard–Novéant railway to join the LGV Est at Vandières.

Besides the construction of the LGV, the project includes:

- construction of three TGV stations:
  - Champagne-Ardenne TGV near Reims (Bezannes)
  - Meuse TGV (Trois-Domaines)
  - Lorraine TGV (in Louvigny, near Metz-Nancy-Lorraine Airport)
- upgrades and improvements to terminal lines and facilities, especially between the Gare de l'Est station in Paris and Vaires-sur-Marne and on the Strasbourg–Kehl main line.
- modernisation of city centre stations
- electrification of lines through the Vosges valleys to permit seamless TGV running

Journey times have decreased as follows:

From	To	Original Time	First Phase	Second Phase
Paris	Strasbourg	4h 00	2h 20	1h 45
Paris	Reims	1h 35	0h 45	-
Paris	Sedan	2h 50	2h 00	-
Paris	Charleville-Mézières	2h 30	1h 35	-
Paris	Nancy	2h 45	1h 30	-
Paris	Metz	2h 45	1h 25	-
Paris	Luxembourg	3h 55	2h 05	-
Luxembourg	Strasbourg	2h 17	-	1h 35
Paris	Basel	4h 55	3h 20	-
Paris	Zürich	5h 50	4h 35	-
Paris	Frankfurt	6h 15	3h 50	3h 40
Paris	Stuttgart	6h 10	3h 40	3h 10
Paris	Saarbrücken	4h 00	1h 50	-

==== Phase one ====
Earthworks for the first phase between Vaires-sur-Marne and Baudrecourt started in spring 2002. The contractors took three years to complete the earthworks and some 327 pieces of structural work as well as re-establishing communications for people and wildlife. Tracklaying and building the new stations started in 2004.

As the first infrastructure project of its kind to be declared a public utility by the Ministry of the Environment, the LGV Est is also the first railway to be financed largely by the French regions and the European Union (EU).

Civil engineering works were distributed in eight contracts which were awarded after bidding by five companies: SNCF, ISL, Tractebel, Scétauroute and Setec. This is the first time there has been competition for the construction of a TGV line since reform of the rail system in 1997 and the involvement of RFF. SNCF Engineering, in partnership with EEG Simecsol succeeded in obtaining four of the contracts (including one for the second phase), this being 50% of the civil engineering project.

Illustration of the alignment of the second phase of the LGV Est.

On 9 June 2007, the TGV Est made its inaugural voyage, leaving from the Gare de l'Est at 7:36am. Notable passengers included: François Fillon, the French Prime Minister, Alain Juppé, the Minister of Sustainable Development, and the Argentinian Ambassador to France. The Prime Minister hailed this event as "a beautiful symbol of the capacity of our country to innovate when it is united, a symbol of European France, of the knowledge of French businesses, and a symbol that gives confidence in the future." He hailed this achievement as "a union by train between France and its German, Luxembourgish, and Swiss partners, between the European institutions and the [French] capital."

==== Phase two ====
On 2 September 2009, infrastructure manager RFF announced the tendering for the second phase. Financing was finalized on 1 September 2009, with a mix of sources ranging from the French and Luxembourgish governments, regional governments, the EU, and RFF. The full line was planned to open on 3 April 2016, but that opening was delayed to 3 July by a major accident during testing of the line. Until then, TGV ran between these two cities via the existing Metz-Strasbourg line at the 160 km/h (99 mph) normal speed for the line.

The final weld of rails on the second phase took place on 31 March 2015 and was accompanied by a ceremony marking the end of construction of Phase 2, although work on signaling continued. The opening of the second phase had been scheduled for 3 April 2016, but was delayed after a train derailed near Eckwersheim during commissioning trials, resulting in 11 deaths and damage to a bridge on the line. The line opened on 3 July 2016. A landslide in March 2020 caused a derailment, with 22 minor injuries, and one serious.

== World speed record ==
A series of high speed trials, named Operation V150, were conducted on the LGV Est prior to its June 2007 opening using a specially modified train. The trials were conducted jointly by SNCF, TGV builder Alstom, and LGV Est owner Réseau Ferré de France between 15 January 2007 and 15 April 2007. Following a series of increasingly high speed runs, the official speed record attempt took place on 3 April 2007. The top speed of 574.8 km/h (159.7 m/s, 357.2 mph) was reached at kilometre point 193 near the village of Le Chemin, between the Meuse and Champagne-Ardenne TGV stations, where the most favourable profile exists.

The 515.3 km/h (320.2 mph) speed record of 1990 was unofficially broken multiple times during the test campaign that preceded and followed the certified record attempt, the first time on 13 February 2007 with a speed of 554.3 km/h (344.4 mph), and the last time on 15 April 2007 with a speed of 542.9 km/h (337.3 mph).

== Construction financing ==
The total cost was about €4 billion, apportioned as follows:

- 61% public funds
  - French government
  - 17 local authorities
  - European Union
  - Luxembourg
- 17% RFF
- 22% SNCF (including €800 million for TGV rolling stock)

== Timeline ==
- 22 May 1992: French-German La Rochelle summit; commitment by France and Germany to create a high-speed rail line linking the two countries, comprising a northern branch via Saarbrücken-Mannheim and a southern branch via Strasbourg-Karlsruhe
- 14 May 1996: declaration of public utility
- 2001: refurbishment of a number of stations in Germany (for example Kaiserslautern) and launch of infrastructure work in Germany (line upgrading for 200 km/h (120 mph) on sections of the conventional line between Saarbrücken and Mannheim)
- 28 January 2002: official beginning of works for first phase between Vaires-sur-Marne and Baudrecourt
- 18 December 2003: government of Jean-Pierre Raffarin announces approximately 50 improvement projects, of which eight are for the TGV, including second phase works due to begin about 2010; additionally, connection of TGV Est with ICE to occur between 2007 and 2010
- 19 October 2004: laying of the first LGV Est rail at Saint-Hilaire-au-Temple (Marne) by the transport minister, Gilles de Robien; earthworks are 80% complete and of the 338 structural projects, 290 (of which 14 are viaducts) are complete
- June 2006: the catenary between Marne and Meuse is powered
- 31 October 2006: the catenary for the entire length of the line is powered to enable testing
- 13 November 2006: beginning of technical testing of the central 210 km of the line using specialized trains to check correct track geometry, etc., at speeds up to 320 km/h (199 mph)
- 25 January 2007: An initial budget of €94 million is allocated to the second phase of the line between Baudrecourt and Strasbourg
- 30 January 2007: The power is on over the whole length of 300 km.
- 1 February 2007: The control centre at Pagny-sur-Moselle is opened.
- 13 February 2007: A new world record for train speed is unofficially set by a TGV during tests on the LGV Est.
- 3 April 2007: An official new world speed record for conventional trains of 574.8 km/h (357.2 mph) is set by a TGV on the LGV Est.
- 9 June 2007: The inaugural voyage of the LGV Est is completed (see below).
- 10 June 2007: The LGV Est opens for commercial service.
- 16 May 2008: First Stop of ICE-MF due to a transformer fire on this route.
- 29 October 2009: the European Commission announced that LGV Est's second phase has been awarded €76M, out of total costs of €633.3M. The Commission stated the funding had been brought forward to accelerate construction due to the economic crisis.
- June 2010: Construction begins on phase 2
- 10 November 2011 – 19 June 2012: First bore of the Saverne Tunnel bored.
- 26 September 2012 – 25 February 2013: Second bore of the Saverne Tunnel bored.
- 31 March 2015: Final weld of rails on second phase marking the end of construction of the second phase.
- 14 November 2015: A TGV derailed in the commune of Eckwersheim during testing on the then-unopened second phase, killing at least ten people
- 3 July 2016: Opening of the second phase, delayed by 3 months by the accident.

== Accidents ==
- On 16 May 2008, a car of an ICE 3MF at Annet-sur-Marne caught fire. The train, with around 300 passengers, had to be evacuated after a transformer had caught fire. The cause is suspected to be a defective drive motor, from which parts had come loose and damaged the transformer.

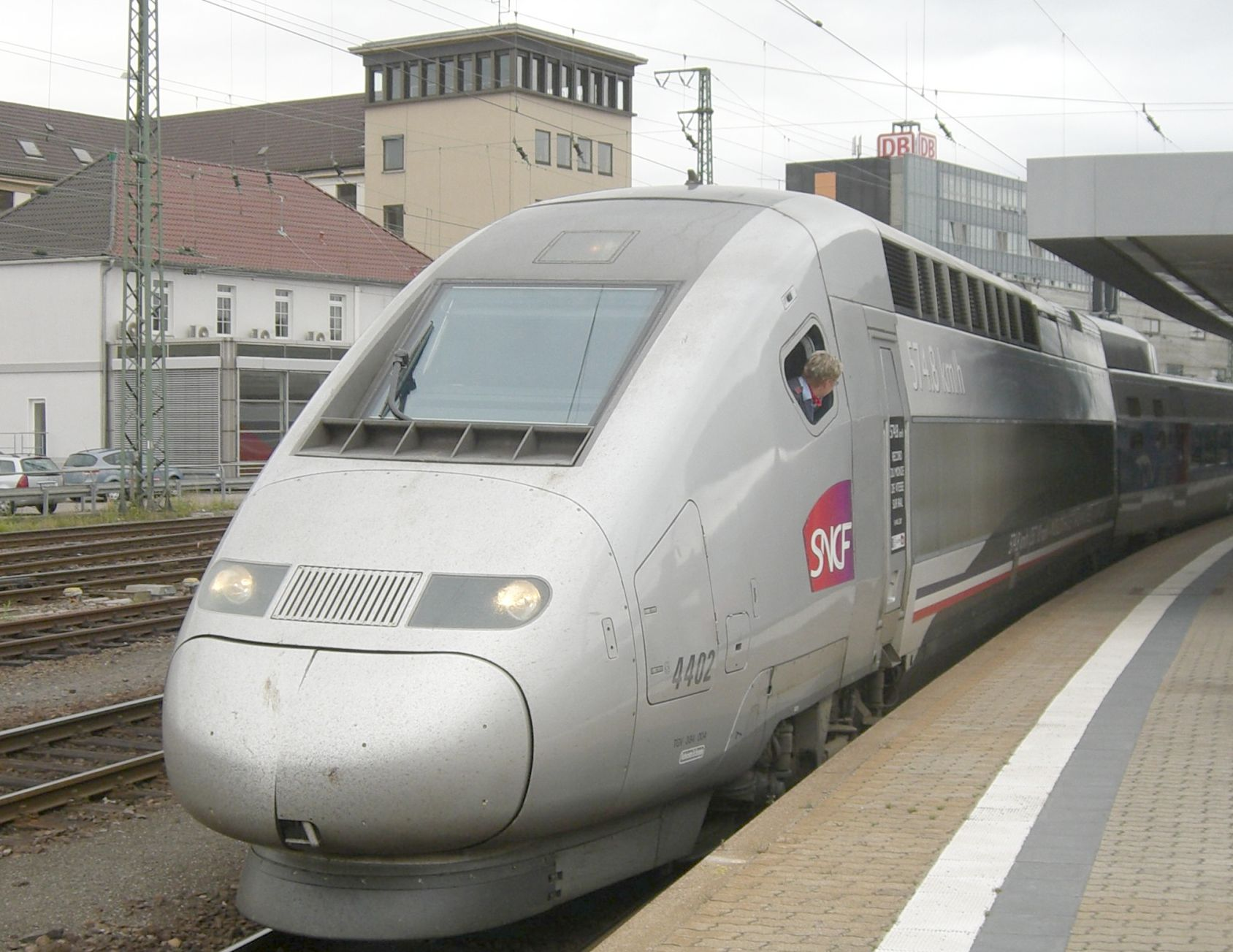
TGV with world record power unit (V150) as ICE replacement Paris-Frankfurt in Saarbrücken Hbf in June 2008 (with German engine driver)

- On 12 June 2008, a "short turnaround" of an ICE coming from Paris, which was to return from the St. Ingbert in Saarland to Paris, resulted in several slightly injured travelers. All passengers should change at this small station into a substitute IC arrived from Frankfurt; its passengers, on the other hand, should transfer to the turning ICE. As a result of several faulty ICE units, some intermittent ICE journeys completely failed or were replaced by TGV trains in the same week; On 13 June 2008, the DB then restricted the continuous traffic on the POS Northeast for the time being from five to three connections. The remaining rides were broken: TGV operated Paris-Saarbrücken and back; IC Saarbrücken-Frankfurt and back. Only two of the six existing ICE trainsets were needed. From 19 June 2008, the trains went through again, but some courses were still served by TGV. These can not turn in Mannheim and must drive over Käfertal, which leads to small delays.
- On the afternoon of 8 July 2008, ICE 9555 Paris-Frankfurt collided in the area of the Kennelgarten station near Kaiserslautern with a truck that had been stuck in the gravel while turning in a construction site. The approximately 400 passengers of the ICE remained unhurt, but six of the eight cars of the ICE were damaged. The train could later continue with its own strength to Kaiserslautern, where the passengers had to change to a replacement train.
- In July 2008, there were again numerous ICE failures; from 21 July – 23 August 2008, TGV units regularly helped with one full-round journey. Nevertheless, passengers often had to change trains in or from Saarbrücken, Homburg / Saar or Forbach (F) to or from TGV trains, or in some cases were not carried as a result of a lack of vehicles. Also in the course of autumn and in the winter of 2008/2009 the ICE disturbances continued; there were always TGV replacement services and / or breaking the connection in Saarbrücken Hbf.
- On 14 November 2015, the TGV accident in Eckwersheim caused the most severe accident with a TGV. During a test drive a train derailed due to excessive speed in a curve and partially crashed into the Rhine-Marne Canal. 11 people died, 42 others were injured, 12 of them seriously.

== See also ==
- TGV
- High-speed rail in France
- Intercity Express
