= Grohe (surname) =

Grohe, Grohé, or Gröhe is a German surname. It is the surname of:

- Friedrich Grohe, founder of sanitary fittings company Grohe, son of Hans
- Gabrielle Grohe, owner of the Black Star of Queensland star sapphire
- Hagen Grohe, vocalist for The Joe Perry Project
- Hans Grohe (born 1871), founder of sanitary fittings company Hansgrohe, father of Friedrich
- Hermann Gröhe (born 1961), German politician
- Josef Grohé (1902–1987), German Nazi Party official
- Marcelo Grohe (born 1987), Brazilian footballer
- Martin Grohe (born 1967), German mathematician and computer scientist
