= Crane Plumbing Corporation =

Canadian manufacturer of plumbing fixtures

- Founded: 1906 in Winnipeg, Manitoba
- Fate: Merged
- Subsidiaries: Crane company

Crane Plumbing Corporation was a Canadian manufacturer of plumbing fixtures, established in Winnipeg, Manitoba, in 1906, as a subsidiary of the U.S. firm Crane Company (founded 1855 in Chicago by Richard T. Crane).

== History ==
Crane Company merged in February 2008 with American Standard Americas and Eljer to create American Standard Brands.

Over the course of its history, Crane Plumbing Corporation had moved to Montreal, Quebec, and as of 2012, it was based in Stratford, Ontario, largely in a customer support role.

Currently, American Standard Canada operates out of Mississauga, Ontario. Crane Plumbing also in the 1980's acquired Universal Rundle.

== Products ==
Crane products include:

- Bathtubs
- Showers
- Bidets
- Sinks
- Toilets
- Washstands

== See also ==
- Sterling Plumbing
- Sloan Valve Company
