= Schiltach =

- Town
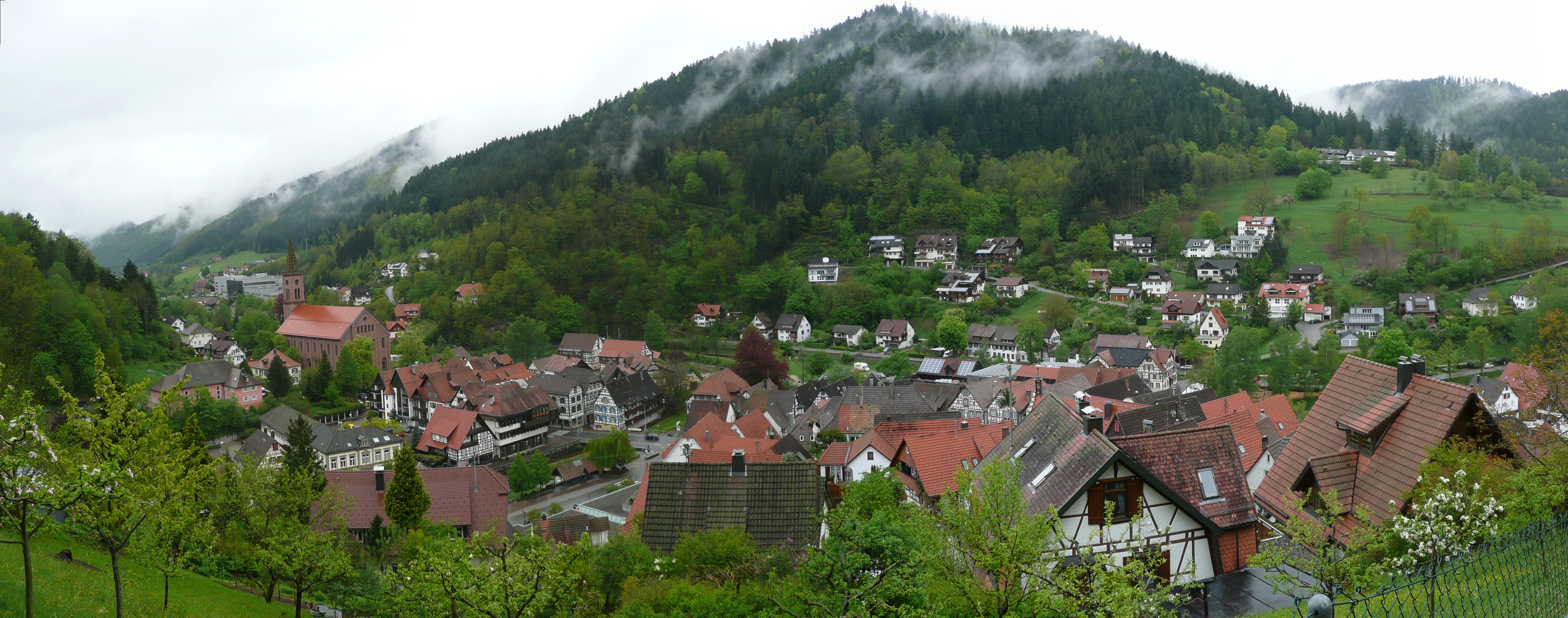
- General view of Schiltach

- Coat of arms

- Location of Schiltach within Rottweil district
- Interactive map of Schiltach
- Location within Germany Location within Baden-Württemberg
- Coordinates: 48°17′26″N 08°20′41″E
- Country: Germany
- State: Baden-Württemberg
- Admin. region: Freiburg
- District: Rottweil
- Subdivisions: 2 Ortsteile

Government
  - Mayor (2018–26): Thomas Haas

Area
  - Total: 34.21 km^{2} (13.21 sq mi)
- Elevation: 330 m (1,080 ft)

Population (2025-12-31)
  - Total: 3,495
  - Density: 102.2/km^{2} (264.6/sq mi)
- Time zone: UTC+01:00 (CET)
  - Summer (DST): UTC+02:00 (CEST)
- Postal codes: 77757–77761
- Dialling codes: 07836
- Vehicle registration: RW
- Website: www.schiltach.de

Schiltach (German pronunciation: [ˈʃɪltax]) is a town in the district of Rottweil, in Baden-Württemberg, Germany. It is situated in the eastern Black Forest, on the river Kinzig, 20 km south of Freudenstadt.

== Geography ==
Schiltach lies on the eastern side of the Black Forest, at the confluence of the Schiltach and Kinzig rivers. It lies at an altitude of 330 metres (1,083 ft).

=== Climate ===
Like most of Germany, Schiltach has an oceanic climate (Köppen climate classification Cfb).

=== Town subdivisions ===
The borough of Schiltach consists of the parishes of Schiltach and Lehengericht. The two districts are geographically identical to the previously independent municipalities of the same name.

The district Schiltach includes the town of Schiltach, the villages of Grumpenbächle and Vorderheubach and the settlements of Auf der Staig, Blattenhäuserwiese, Grumpen and Kuhbacherhof (Vor Kuhbach). The ruined castle of Willenburg is also located within the borough of Schiltach.

The village of Lehengericht has its own council, a mayor as its chairman and its own village administration. The district of Lehengericht also consists of the settlements and hamlets of Herdweg, Auf dem Hof, Schmelzle, Vor dem unteren Erdlinsbach, Vor Reichenbächle, Welschdorf, Höllgraben, Im Eulersbach, Im hinteren Erdlinsbach, Kienbronn, Rohrbach, Rubstock, Deisenbauernhof and several isolated farms.

== History ==
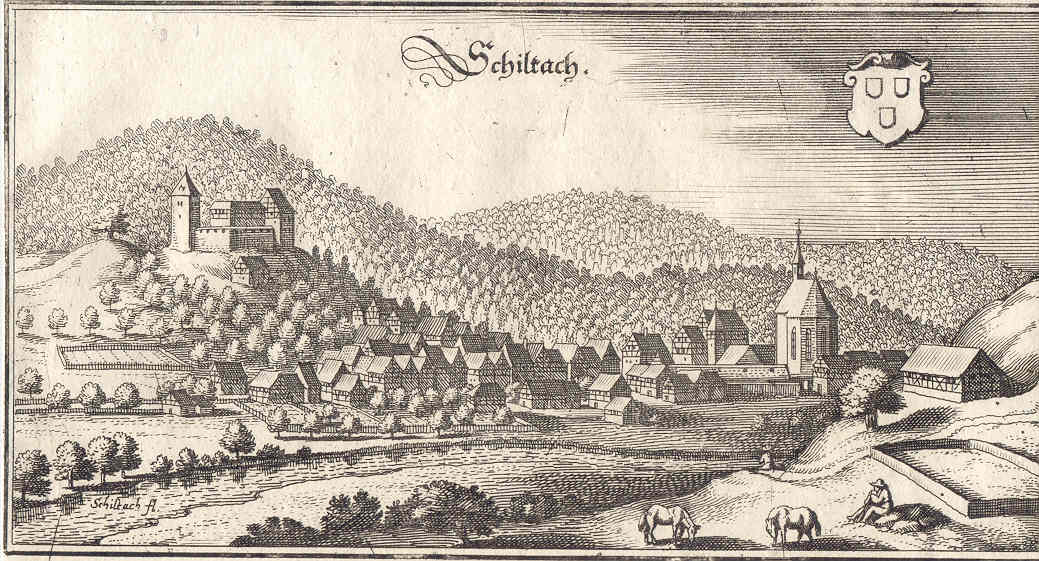
1643 townscape by Swiss engraver, Matthäus Merian, showing the castle above the town of Schiltach

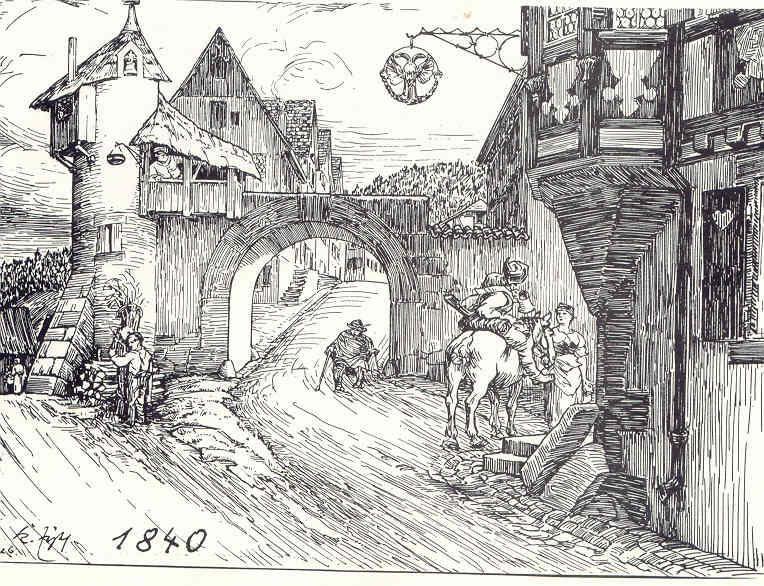
Lower gate by the Gasthaus Adler until 1840

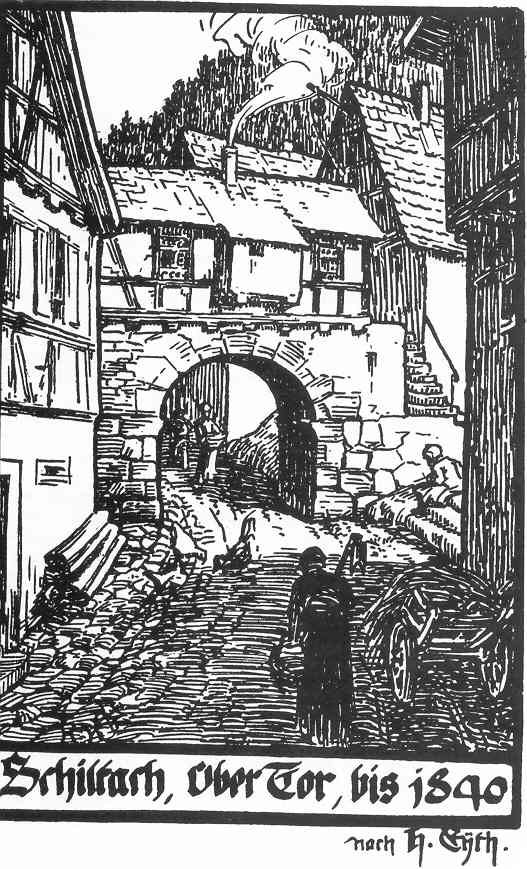
Upper gate by H. Eyth (until 1840)

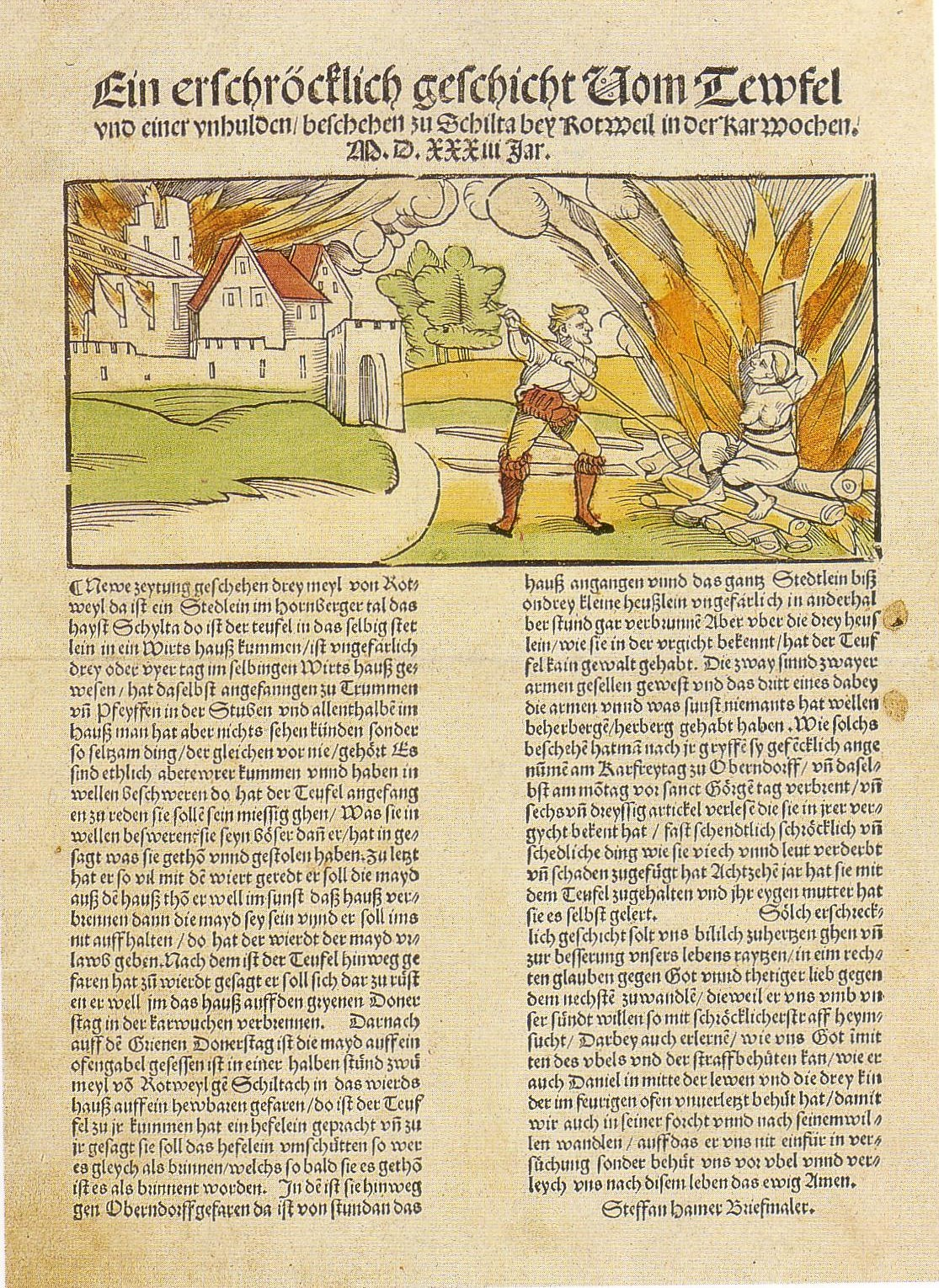
1533 account of the execution of a witch charged with burning the town of Schiltach in 1531

Even in Roman times the road through the Kinzig valley was already part of a link through the Black Forest from the Strasbourg area towards Rottweil.

Schiltach was founded in the 11th century as a parish for the surrounding farms, which are older than Schiltach. Around the town church, which today stands in the town district Vorstädtle and is evangelic, rose a settlement named after the River Schiltach. The Dukes of Teck probably founded the town of Schiltach in the middle of the 13th century to secure their territories. They built a surrounding town wall with gates and a castle above the town. They did not build a church because Schiltach already had one.

The town was intended to act as a stop for travellers and as a trading post before the road descended to Rottweil. From about 1250, the castle and town took over the function of the Willenburg, which had guarded the road before the founding of Schiltach.

In 1371 Schiltach was transferred to the Dukes of Urslingen. After ten years, the impoverished dukes of Urslingen sold the castle and town to the Dukes of Württemberg. Württemberg retained Schiltach until 1810 except the years from 1519 to 1534, when Schiltach was occupied by the free imperial city of Rottweil and later (like the whole Duchy of Württemberg) by Further Austria.

In the "Gränzvertrag zwischen dem Königreich Württemberg und dem Großherzogthum Baden" (border treaty between the Kingdom of Württemberg and Grand Duchy of Baden), which was negotiated in Paris on October 2, 1810, several areas of the Oberamt Hornberg, besides Schiltach also the town of Hornberg and the communities Gutach and Kirnbach, got to the Grand Duchy of Baden. Wolfach became the new Amststadt of Schiltach and later the county town. The surrounding farm became as Lehengericht, an own community.

In 1952, Schiltach went to the state Baden-Württemberg. The county of Wolfach was dissolved in 1973 and Schiltach was allocated to Rottweil. The community of Lehengericht was reincorporated into the town of Schiltach in 1974. In 1979 the exclave of Sulzbächle/Fischbach went to the town of Wolfach, in return the area of Vor Heubach went to Schiltach.

=== Religions ===
During the Protestant Reformation, Schiltach was a part of Württemberg so it was Protestant, like the territorial lords. It did not change until the 19th century when, because of industrialisation, more and more Catholics moved in. Today in Schiltach there are Protestant and Catholic communities as well as a New Apostolic community and various minor religious communities.

- The Evangelical (Protestant) town church (Stadtkirche) was built in neo-Byzantine style after the old Gothic church burned down.
- The Catholic Church St. Johannes der Täufer was blessed in 1966 as successor of the old catholic church from 1899, which had to be replaced because of its small size.
- The New Apostolic Church at the Hauptstraße comes from the 1980s. The old New Apostolic church in Schenkenzeller Straße still has the characteristic cross on the roof but, despite its size, is used as a residential house.

=== Incorporations ===
- 1934: Area of former Habershof
- 1936: Area Kuhbacher Hof
- 1 April 1974: Community Lehengericht
- 1979: Area Vor Heubach

=== Emblem ===

Today's town emblem was adopted of the Dukes of Urslingen. The emblem became free to use as the last Urlinger, Duke Reinhold IV. of Urslingen died in 1442. Probably it was conveyed by the Count Ludwig of Württemberg, which was a patron of the town.

The emblem shows three red shields in a white field. Almost the same emblem can be found in Alsace at the house of the Rappolstein, which castle stands above Ribeauvillé. A member of the Ursling family married into Rappolstein family.

== Politics ==
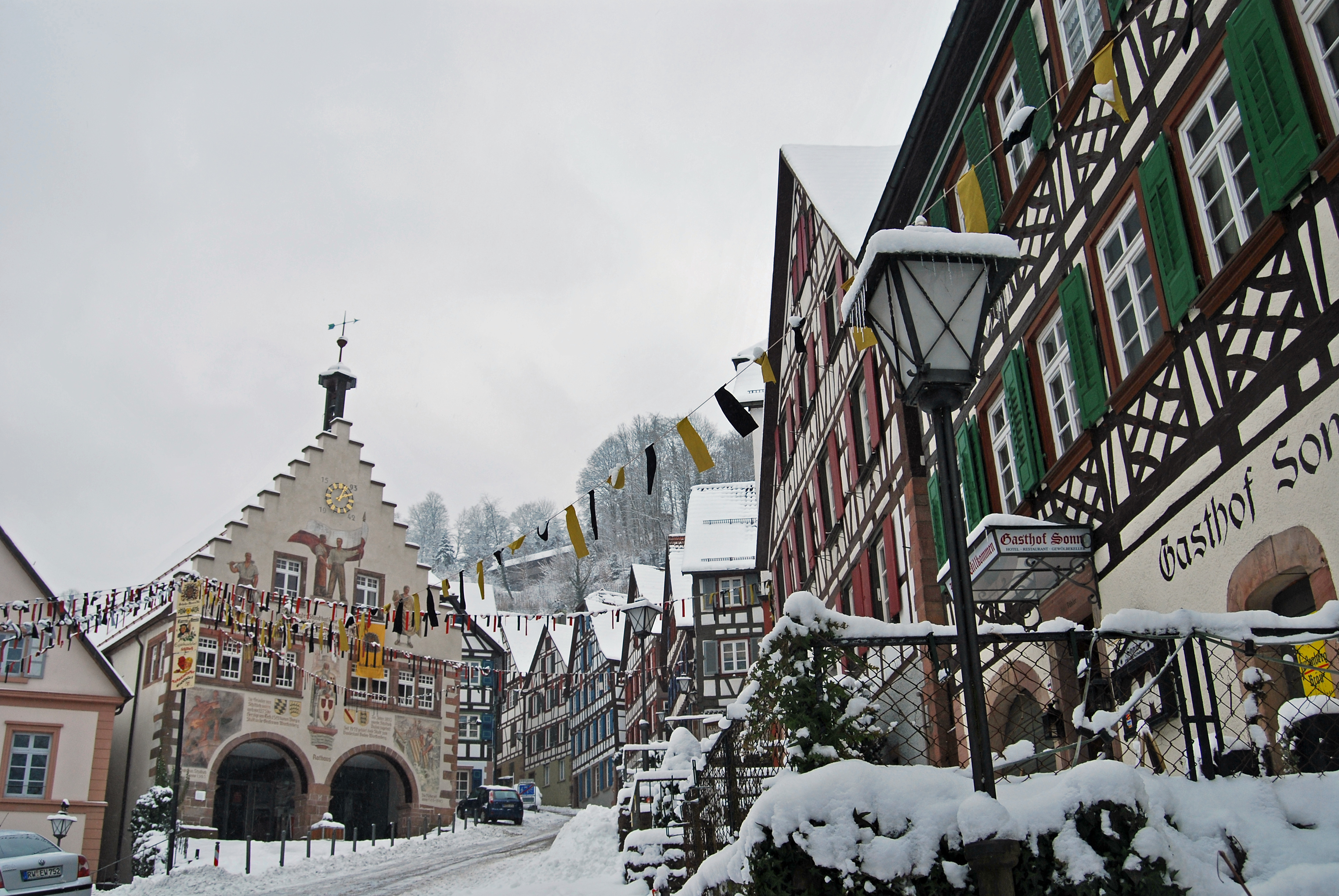
Town hall

=== Local council ===
The local council has besides the mayor 14 members, including three women. The local election took place on 7 June 2009 and had following results:

Bund unabhängiger Wähler	41,7% (+1,5)	6 Seats (=)
CDU	25,8% (+1,3)	4 Seats (=)
Freie Wählervereinigung Schiltach	20,9% (+0,7)	3 Seats (=)
SPD	11,6% (-3,4)	1 Seat (-1)

The town district Lehengericht has a Ortsschaftsrat with eight members.

=== Twin town ===
Schiltach holds a partnership with Geising in Saxony.

== Economy and infrastructure ==
=== Industry ===
Despite its rural location the town possesses an industrial base with several internationally known companies. Already in the time of Industrialization there were industrial areas. Schiltach had several textile mills, which took advantage of the soft water from the two rivers; also there were multiple saw mills and tanneries for the same reason. Until the Kinzig Valley Railway was built there was a timber rafting, which had to close because of the railway. The wood from Schiltach and surroundings was partly shipped to the Netherlands on the Rhine, where it was used for ship building. Today these branches of industries have vanished except for the famous tannery Trautwein and some small saw mills. The earlier privileged timber rafting is kept alive by an active rafter group to keep the once important industry of Schiltach in mind.

There are still some companies which were established at the turn of the twentieth century like Hansgrohe (1901), and (BBS; VEGA Grieshaber KG etc.) was established later.

The industry of Schiltach provides approximately 3350 jobs, which is extraordinary because Schiltach has only roughly 4000 citizens. Also, Schiltach is topographically disadvantaged because it is in the narrowest place in the Kinzig valley and the Autobahn 81 and Autobahn 5 motorways are far away. Schiltach's local political leaders are willing to support the companies in order to encourage them to stay in the town.

=== Education ===
The town of Schiltach has one elementary school and had a Hauptschule (Nachbarschaftsschule Schiltach/Schenkenzell) with Werkrealschule. Secondary Schools are in the surrounding towns, e.g. in Schramberg, Wolfach, Alpirsbach and Hausach. There also is an evangelic and catholic kindergarten, a Waldorfkindergarten and a private day care centre. The Folk High School Schiltach/Schenkenzell is an outpost of the Folk High School Schramberg.

=== Transport ===
Schiltach is connected with the B 294 and B 462 federal highways, which close the gap between Rhine and Neckar, thus also the gap between the motorways A 81 and A 5. Traffic through Schiltach has been relieved by a bypass. The Bundesstraße 294 runs through the 1,830-metre-long Kirchberg Tunnel and the 830-metre-long Schloßberg Tunnel through which the B 462 also runs.

The town has two railway stations, Schiltach and Schiltach Mitte. Both have hourly service to Offenburg and Freudenstadt. The Schiltach-Schramberg railway opened in 1892 was closed in 1959 for passenger trains and 1989 for cargo trains, too. Since that time, the tracks have been removed. The route is now a cycle route from Schiltach to Schramberg. Furthermore, there is a cycle route through the Kinzig valley from Haslach to Alpirsbach and bus connections in direction of Offenburg and Freudenstadt as well as a connection via bus to the county town Rottweil. There is also a handicapped accessible bus which drives almost to all town districts at regular intervals.

== Notable places ==
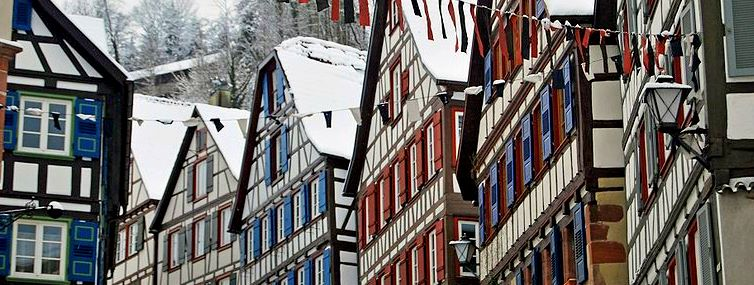
The medieval inner city

The whole medieval inner city is under monument protection. The marketplace includes the town hall, which was designed by architect Heinrich Schickhardt and built during the Kingdom of Württemberg. There are many half-timber houses scattered throughout the town that date back to anywhere between the 16th and 19th centuries. Schiltach is part of the German Half-Timbered House Road tourist route.

A long-distance walking trail known as the Mittelweg spans the Black Forest from north to south (between Pforzheim and Waldshut), and passes through Schiltach as one stage of the trail.

The Silvesterzug is a procession that takes place in Schiltach on New Year's Eve. As part of an old tradition, the citizens walk through the streets with lanterns from the marketplace to the town church and sing hymms of Pietistic origins. During the procession, the street lights of the city are turned off and replaced with pitch torches; the only electric lights to be seen are those of Christmas trees shone through the windows of private households. The local pastor gives a speech from the window of the town rectory, accompanied by the performance of a choir and trombone ensemble. Afterwards, the citizens gather at the town hall, where the mayor also gives a speech.

=== Museums ===
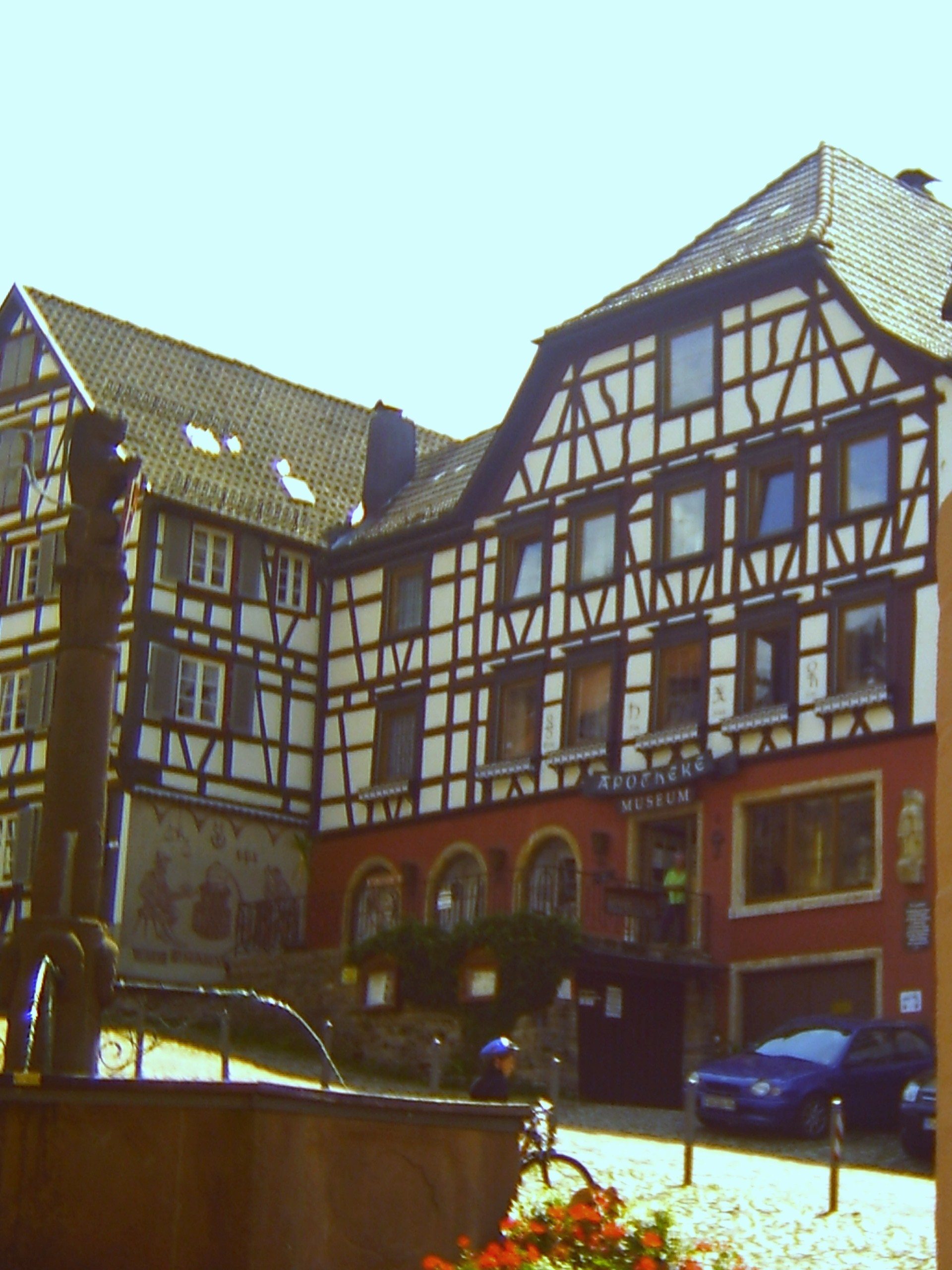
On the right the Chemists Museum (Apothekenmuseum)

- Chemists' Museum (Apothekenmuseum) (former Biedermeier-pharmacy at the market place)
- Museum am Markt (Museum on the Market, town history, industrialization, handicraft)
- Schüttesage Museum (Lumbering and forestry, rafter, old saw with undershot waterwheel and transmittance, tannery
- Museum Wasser - Bad - Design (The evolution of bath and bathing)

=== Buildings ===
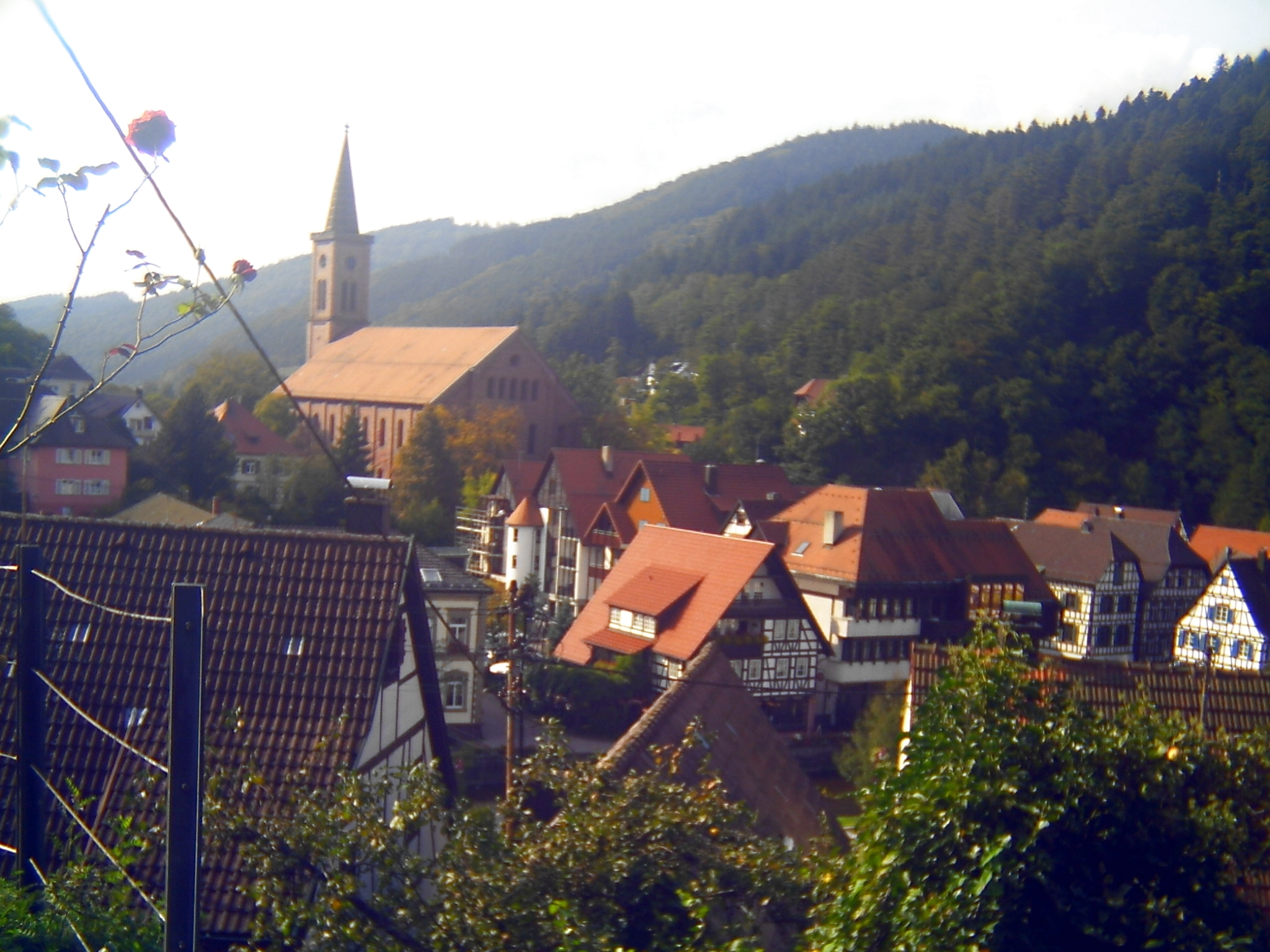
View of the Protestant town church

- Town hall featuring Crow-stepped gable from 1593
- Gasthaus zum Adler ("The Eagle Hotel") from 1604
- Market place
- Lutheran town church from 1839–1843
- Gerbergase (tannery alley) with Äußere Mühle (outer mill) from 1557
- Schloßbergstraße (Road to Schloßberg)
- Städtlebrunnen ("little town well") on the market place
- Jägerhäusle ("huntsman's house") from 1590

=== Ruined castles ===
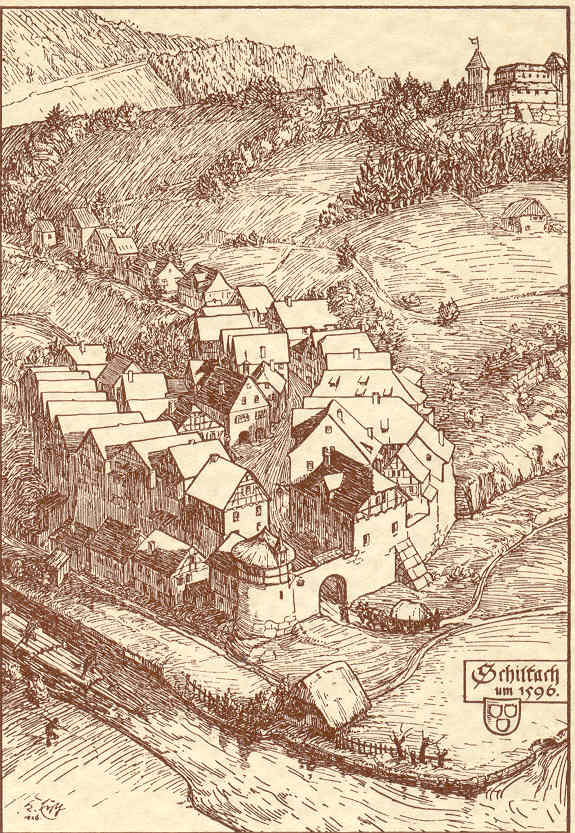
Schiltach and the bottom gate and the castle in 1596

- Schiltach ruin on the Schloßberg
- Willenburg, ruin above the Staighöfe on the Schlössleberg (Little castle mountain)
- Klingenburg, ruin in Hinterlehengericht on the Burbachfelsen (Burbachrock)

=== Regular events ===
Schiltach holds several markets over the year, e.g. a farmer's market on the third Sunday in October or an artisans' market on the last Sunday in April. Besides the Schiltacher Advent and the Silvesterzug every year Fastnacht is celebrated at the time of Fasching.

== Personalities ==
=== Honorary citizens ===
- Heinrich Baumgartner, businessman, born in 1936, honorary citizen since 1 March 2002, founder of BBS
- Bruno Grieshaber, businessman, 1919–2005, honorary citizen since 1 March 2002, founder of VEGA Grieshaber KG
- Friedrich Grohe, businessman, 1904–1983, honorary citizen since 1 March 2002, founder of Friedrich Grohe Armaturenfabrik
- Klaus Grohe, businessman, born 1937, honorary citizen since 1 March 2002, son of Hans Grohe

=== Sons and daughters of the town ===
- Horst Neugart, born 1940 in Schiltach, since 2002 president of the synod of the Evangelical-Lutheran Church in Württemberg
- Carl Frei (1884-1967), mechanical organ builder, composer and music arranger
