= Cornelius Vanderbilt Crane =

American explorer and philanthropist

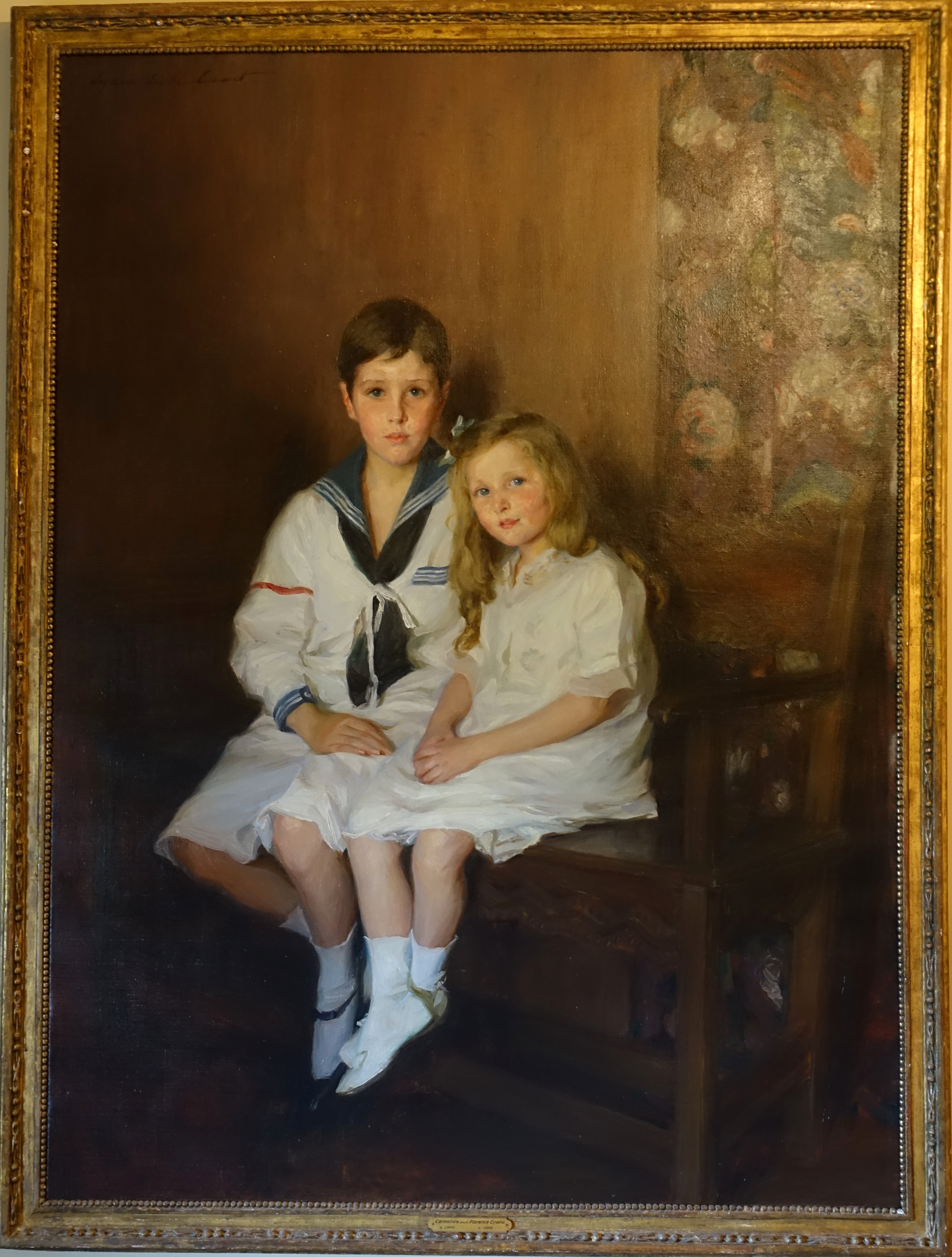
- Cornelius Vanderbilt Crane and his sister Florence, by Lydia Field Emmet, 1914
- Born: June 29, 1905
- Died: July 9, 1962 (aged 57)
- Relatives: Richard T. Crane (grandfather)

Cornelius Vanderbilt Crane (June 29, 1905 - July 9, 1962) was an American explorer and philanthropist.

== Early life ==
Crane was the son of Florence (née Higinbotham) and Richard Teller Crane Jr., and grandson of Richard T. Crane, founder of Crane Co. His maternal grandfather was Harlow Niles Higinbotham.

== Career ==
He is best known for the Crane Pacific Expedition of 1928–1929, which he funded, and which took place aboard his yacht Illyria. The expedition was sponsored by the Chicago Museum of Natural History and staffed by a number of scientists and specialists. It left Boston Harbor on November 16, 1928, stopped at Port-au-Prince, Haiti, and then at the Panama Canal. It departed the canal on December 30, 1928, for stops at the Cocos Islands and Galapagos Islands, where it made extensive collections of local fish and birds. It then continued to the Marquesas group, the Tuamotu Archipelago, Tahiti, Bora Bora, Fiji, New Hebrides, Solomon Islands, New Guinea, Borneo, and onwards, in what was ultimately a circumnavigation of the globe.

== Personal life ==
On the expedition, Crane met Cathalene Isabella Parker Browning (1904–1987), step-daughter of the marine superintendent of the Panama Canal. They married in 1929, at which time he adopted his wife's daughter, Cathalene Parker Browning (1923–2005), from her previous marriage. After the couple divorced in 1940, he disinherited his daughter (she later gave birth to American actor and comedian Chevy Chase), and his ex-wife subsequently married the Austrian painter Rudolf Anton Bernatschke.

Crane remarried in 1955 to Minescule "Miné" Sawahara in a Shinto ceremony in Japan; she later established the Mrs. Cornelius Crane Scholarship at the Juilliard School.

Crane died in July 1962.

== Legacy ==
Cornelius Crane is commemorated in the scientific name of a species of lizard, Sphenomorphus cranei.
