= Lixil Group =

Japanese building materials and housing equipment manufacturer

Lixil Corporation

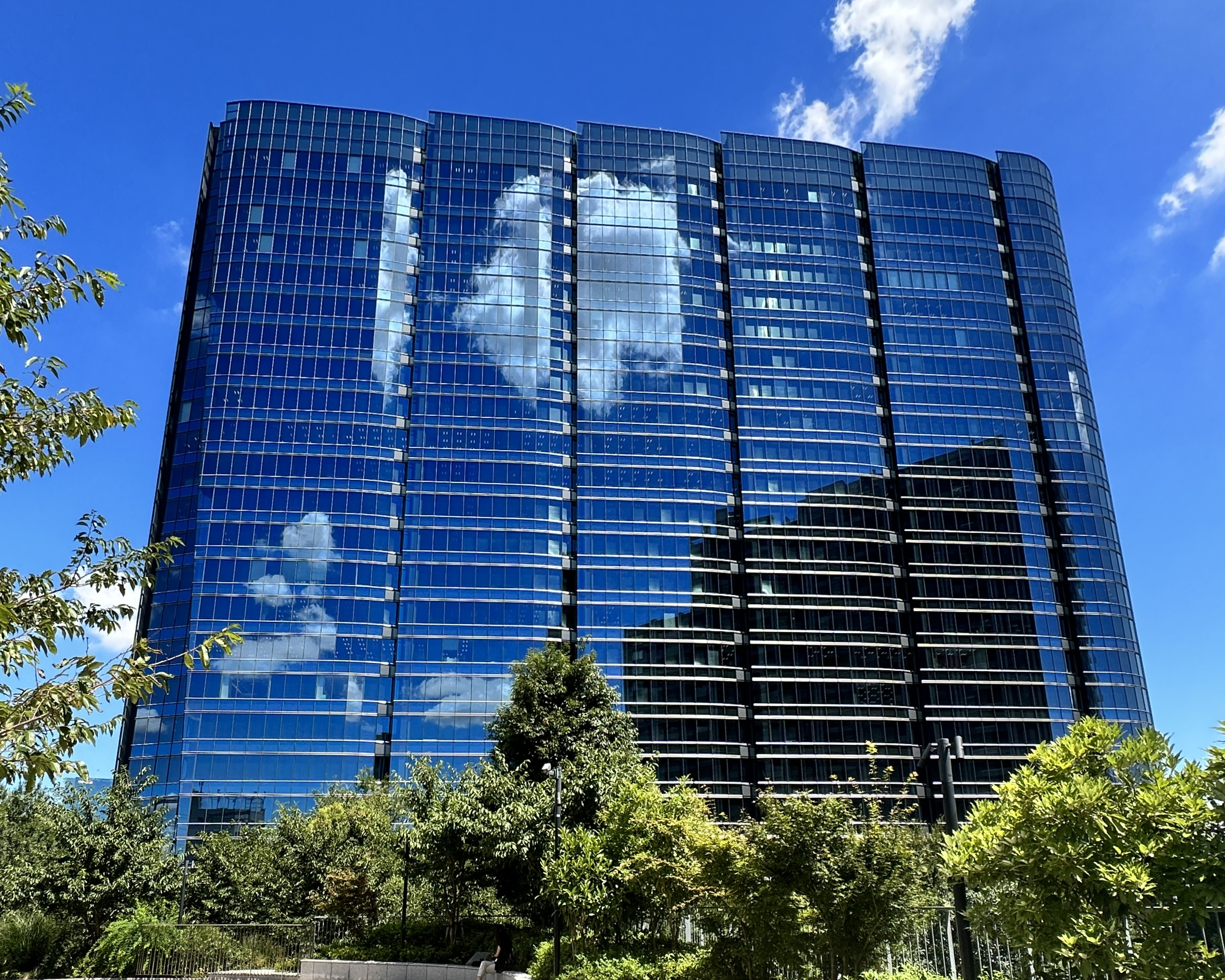
- Headquarters at Osaki Garden Tower, in Shinagawa, Tokyo
- Native name: LIXIL株式会社
- Romanized name: Lixil kabushiki-kaisha
- Formerly: Nihon Tategu Kogyo Co., Ltd. (1949–1971); Toyo Sash Co., Ltd. (1971–1992); Tostem Corporation (1992–2001); Inax Tostem Holdings Corporation (2001–2004); JS Group Corporation (2004–2012); Lixil Group Corporation (2012–2020)
- Type: Public
- Traded as: TYO: 5938; NAG: 5938
- ISIN: JP3626800001
- Industry: Construction materials
- Founded: 19 September 1949; 77 years ago
- Headquarters: Osaki Garden Tower, 1-1-1, Nishi-Shinagawa, Shinagawa, Tokyo, Japan
- Area served: Worldwide
- Key people: Kinya Seto (president and CEO)
- Products: Metal building materials; Plumbing fixtures; Interior furnishing materials
- Revenue: ▲JPY 1,890 billion (FY 2015) (US$ 16.79 billion) (FY 2015)
- Net income: ▼JPY -7.1 billion (FY 2015) (US$63.08 million) (FY 2015)
- Number of employees: 58,889 (as of 31 March 2016)
- Website: www.lixil.com

Lixil Corporation (LIXIL株式会社, Rikushiru kabushiki gaisha) is a Japanese manufacturer of building materials and housing equipment, headquartered in Shinagawa, Tokyo.

The company originated in 1949 as Nippon Tategu Kogyo, a wooden fixture manufacturer that was later renamed Tostem and became Japan's largest producer of aluminum sashes. In 2001, Tostem integrated its management with Inax, a major manufacturer of sanitary ware, to enter the plumbing equipment market. The resulting holding company was renamed JS Group Corporation in 2004. In 2011, the group merged five of its subsidiaries—Tostem, Inax, Shin Nikkei, Sunwave, and TOEX—to establish Lixil Corporation.

Lixil expanded internationally by acquiring the North American operations of American Standard Brands and the German sanitary fittings manufacturer Grohe in 2013. The company's business primarily consists of water technology, including plumbing and sanitary ware, and housing technology, which encompasses windows, doors, and exterior building materials.

== History ==
The primary corporate lineage of Lixil began in September 1949, when Kenjiro Ushioda established Nihon Tategu Kogyo Co., Ltd. (日本建具工業株式会社, Nihon Tategu Kōgyō Kabushiki Gaisha) in Tokyo to manufacture and sell wooden architectural fixtures. To transition from wooden fixtures to aluminum building materials, the company established Toyo Sash Co., Ltd. in 1967 and built an integrated manufacturing plant for aluminum sashes. In 1971, the company officially changed its name to Toyo Sash Co., Ltd. (トーヨーサッシ, Tōyō Sasshi) and absorbed several affiliated companies to consolidate its manufacturing and sales operations.

Toyo Sash expanded its market share against early industry leaders by establishing a dense distribution network and expediting product estimates and deliveries for local builders. The company gradually diversified its business beyond residential sashes. It established Toyo Exterior (TOEX) in 1974 to enter the exterior materials market, and Viva Home in 1977 for the home center retail business.

During the 1980s, Toyo Sash utilized acquisitions to enter the commercial building materials sector. In 1985, the company took over the commercial sash operations of Mitsui Light Metal and acquired shares in companies manufacturing high-rise curtain walls and commercial kitchens. In the same year, Toyo Sash listed its shares on the Tokyo Stock Exchange. In July 1992, the company was renamed Tostem Corporation (トステム株式会社, Tosutemu Kabushiki Gaisha) to reflect its broader focus on comprehensive housing materials.

While Tostem held a dominant market share in residential aluminum sashes and exterior materials, it lacked a presence in plumbing and sanitary ware. To fill this gap and establish a comprehensive housing equipment business, Tostem integrated its management with Inax Corporation (株式会社INAX, Kabushiki Gaisha Inakkusu) in October 2001. Inax, founded in 1924 by Chozaburo Ina, was Japan's second-largest manufacturer of sanitary ware and a major producer of tiles. The two companies established a pure holding company named Inax Tostem Holdings Corporation.

In October 2004, the holding company was renamed JS Group Corporation (株式会社住生活グループ, Kabushiki Gaisha Jū Seikatsu Gurūpu). Under this holding structure, the group continued to expand its product portfolio through corporate acquisitions, bringing the kitchen manufacturer Sunwave and the aluminum building materials maker Shin Nikkei into the group in 2010.

In April 2011, Tostem Corporation, acting as the surviving entity, absorbed its fellow subsidiaries—Inax, Shin Nikkei, TOEX (Toyo Exterior), and a sales subsidiary—and officially changed its operating name to Lixil Corporation. Although the kitchen manufacturer Sunwave was positioned as one of Lixil's five founding brands during this integration, it operated as a separate subsidiary until it was legally absorbed into Lixil Corporation in April 2015. This integration was implemented to reduce costs by consolidating sales and administrative operations, and to enable the company to offer comprehensive proposals to customers by breaking down the divisions between architectural metals and plumbing equipment. Following the merger, the original predecessor company names were retained as product brands.

Subsequently, in July 2012, the parent holding company, JS Group Corporation, was renamed Lixil Group Corporation (LIXILグループ) to align with the newly integrated operating subsidiary and improve overall corporate brand recognition.

Following the domestic consolidation, Lixil initiated a series of large-scale international acquisitions to expand its global presence. In December 2011, the company acquired the Italian high-rise curtain wall manufacturer Permasteelisa. This was followed by the acquisition of the North American plumbing manufacturer American Standard Brands (via ASD Americas Holding Corp.) in August 2013, and the German sanitary fittings manufacturer Grohe in April 2015. Domestically, Lixil continued to integrate its operations, formally absorbing the kitchen manufacturer Sunwave into the main Lixil Corporation in April 2015.

In the late 2010s, Lixil shifted its corporate strategy to concentrate on its core water and housing technology businesses, resulting in the divestment of several subsidiaries. The company sold the professional building materials retailer Ken Depo and Lixil Suzuki Shutter in 2019. In 2020, Lixil sold its shares in Permasteelisa in September, followed by the sale of its home center retail business, Lixil Viva, in November. The interior fabrics manufacturer Kawashima Selkon Textiles, acquired in 2011, was subsequently sold in January 2021.

In December 2020, Lixil Group Corporation absorbed its primary operating subsidiary, Lixil Corporation, dissolving its pure holding company structure to become a direct operating company. The surviving entity was renamed Lixil Corporation.

In April 2022, Lixil transitioned to the Prime Market of the Tokyo Stock Exchange. Later that year, in November 2022, the company relocated its headquarters to Nishi-Shinagawa, Tokyo.

== SaTo ==
Lixil markets water-saving toilets and related products under the brand "SaTo", short for "Safe Toilet". These products are marketed in various countries with plumbing infrastructure deficiencies, including Bangladesh, Uganda, Kenya, Haiti and India as of 2018.

== Sponsorships ==
Lixil is the sponsor of the Lixil Cup, awarded from 2014 to 2016 to the champion team from the finals of Japan's Top League, which the nation's highest level rugby union competition.

The company also sponsors tennis player Kei Nishikori, and was a sponsor of the 2020 Olympic Games.

Following their predecessor company Tostem Corp's longstanding shirt sponsorship of the J.League football club, the Kashima Antlers, Lixil has continued this shirt sponsorship since 2011, when the merger with Tostem occurred.

== Foundation ==
The Lixil JS Foundation sponsors an annual architecture competition at universities (Lixil International University Competition) to promote sustainable building technology. The student architecture prize is endowed with a total of $21,000. All houses are located in Taiki, Hokkaido.

	title	university	architect	students	site management	structural engineer	general contractor
2017		The Universita Indonesia	Mikhael Johanes	Lissa Christie, Lopez Surya, Nadia Amira, Kevin Romario			
2016	infinite field	Royal Danish Academy of Fine Arts	Anders Brix	Kazumasa Takada, Bas Spaanderman, Scarlett Emma Hessian, Jesse Thomas, Benjamin Hock Yuu Tan, Konstantinos Fetsis	Kengo Kuma and Associates	Oak Structural Design	Takahashi Construction Company
2015	inverted house	Oslo School of Architecture and Design	Raphael Zuber, Neven Fuchs, Thomas McQuillan	Laura Cristea, Mari Hellum, Stefan Hurrell, Niklas Lenander	Kengo Kuma and Associates	Oak Structural Design	
2014	Nest We Grow	University of California		Hsiu-Wei Chang, Fanzheng Dong, Hsin-Yu Chen, Yan Xin Huang, Baxter Smith, Max Edwards	Kengo Kuma and Associates		
2013	Horizon House	Harvard University Graduate School of Design	Mark Mulligan, Thomas Sherman, Ana Garcia Puyol, Carlos Cerezo Davila	Carlos Cerezo Davila, Matthew Conway, Robert Daurio, Ana Garcia Puyol, Mariano Gomez Luque, Natsuma Imai, Takuya Iwamura, and Thomas Sherman	Kengo Kuma and Associates		
2012	Même						
2011	barn house	Keio University Japan	Saikawa Takumi, Sano Satoshi, Eureka Architects und Co+Labo	Millica Muminović, Hashida Wataru, Shinohara Masato, Kato Yoshiaki, Sasamura Yoshihiro mit Darko und Vuk Radović, Komatsu Katsuhito, Kobayashi Kosuke, Kanemaru Mayumi	Kengo Kuma Architecture Associates, Komatsu Katsuhito		
