= William Lorenzo Moss =

American physician and professor of medicine

William Lorenzo Moss (23 August 1876 – August 12, 1957) was an American physician and professor of medicine. He developed the Moss System of blood groups in 1910 which was used to ensure safe blood transfusions before more detailed classifications based on refinements of Landsteiner's work came into practice.

Moss was born in Athens, Georgia and was educated at the University of Georgia. After receiving a bachelor's degree in 1897 in civil engineering before he joined Johns Hopkins University to study medicine and graduated MD in 1905. He worked as an instructor at the Phipps Tuberculosis Dispensary in 1910. Landsteiner had identified three blood groups in 1901 and added a fourth in 1902 (AB). Jan Jansky also developed a classification in 1907 in Prague. Moss used Roman numbers for his groups and identified compatibility of the groups to avoid agglutination during blood transfers. He also contributed to anesthetic management. He later taught at Yale, Harvard and the Georgia School of Medicine where he served as dean. Moss travelled around the world, taking part in expeditions such as the Crane Pacific Expedition and studied immunization for diphtheria, tuberculosis and influenza.

Moss married Elizabeth Wilde and they had three children.
