= Cornelius Crane Pacific Expedition =

Zoological expedition, 1928 to 1929

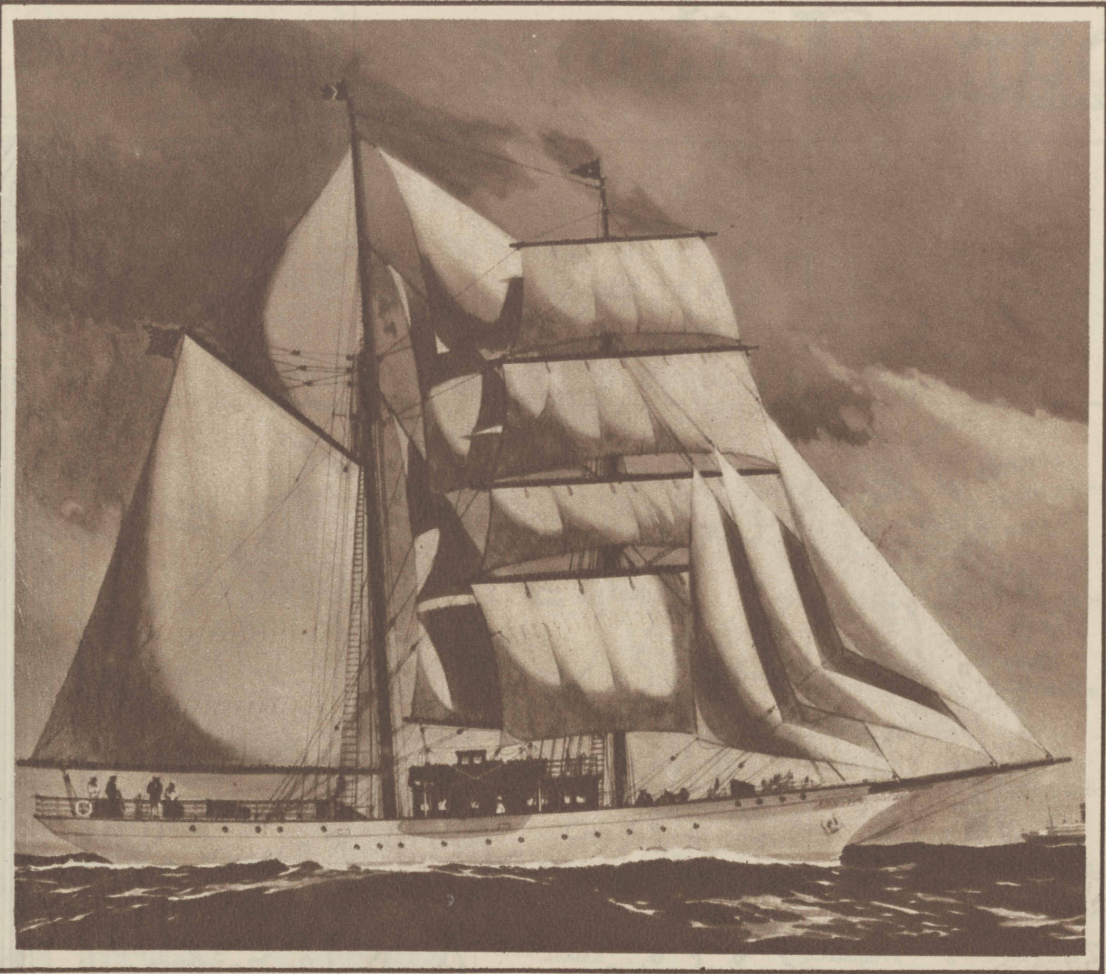
The Illyria yacht, property of Cornelius Crane

The Cornelius Crane Pacific Expedition was privately sponsored by Cornelius Vanderbilt Crane, and the Field Museum of Natural History institutionally sponsored the expedition. Beginning November 1928, the expedition, led by Cornelius Crane in the Illyria yacht, covered over 30,000 miles along the South Pacific, coasts along Asia, North Pacific, and west coasts of Canada. The expedition was funded primarily with the intent of making an accurate record of specimens and obtaining particular specimens such as sea serpents, cassowaries, cormorants, as well as an array of different reptiles and amphibians. When their expedition ended in late September 1929, they brought back with them over 16,000 specimens.

== Funding ==
Cornelius Vanderbilt Crane was a benefactor of the Field Museum of Natural History and known philanthropist with an interest in exploring the world. The expedition was initially planned to be a trip for pleasure, but Cornelius Crane offered to fund it for the Field Museum. The expedition was institutionally sponsored by the Field Museum.

== Crew ==
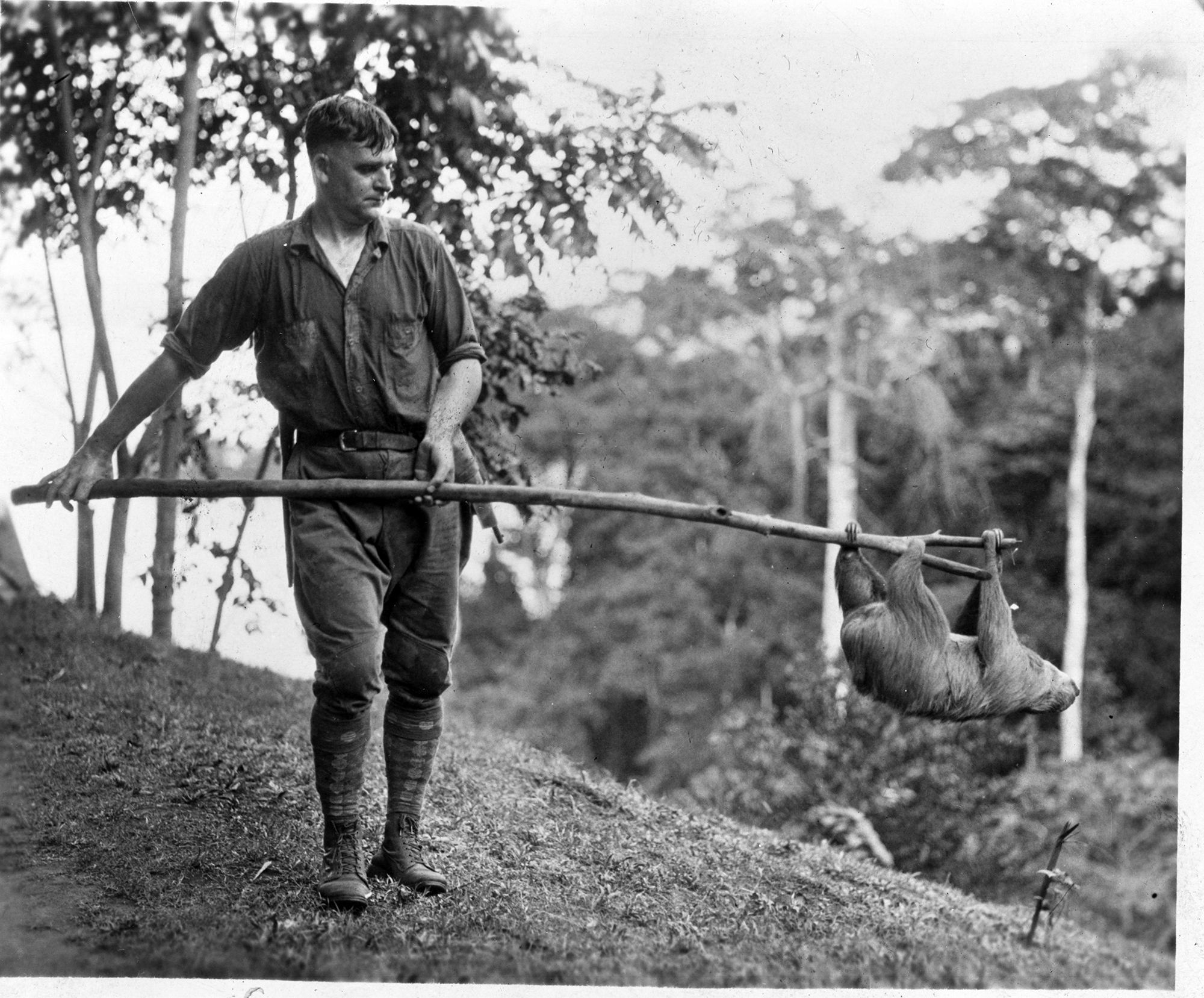
KP Schmidt carries a sloth on a pole

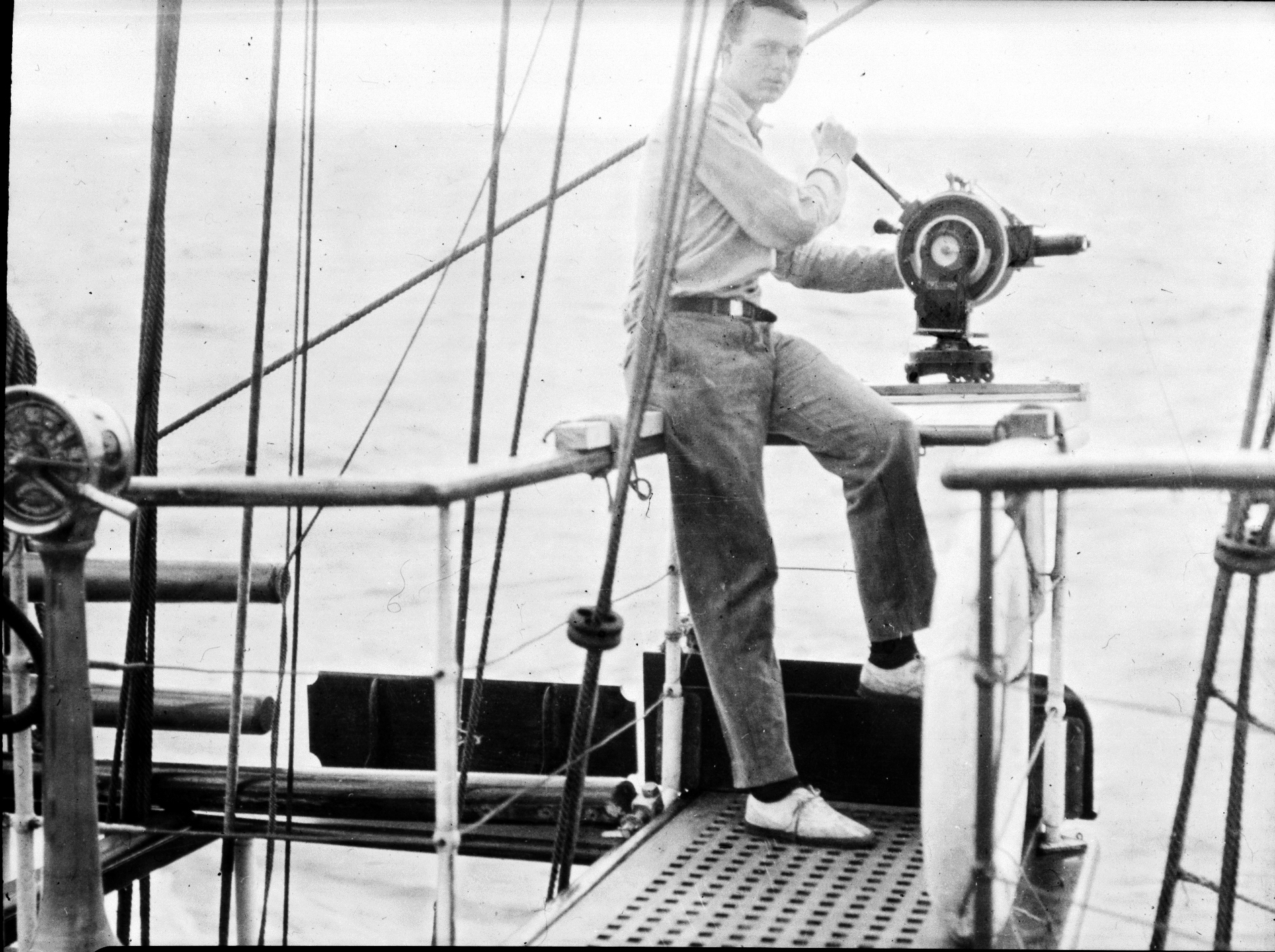
Photographer Sidney Shurcliff with Akeley Camera aboard the Illyria

Cornelius Crane was the leader of this expedition. The captain and navigator was Seldon B. Boutilier, a man who had 30 years of experience at sea. Field Museum staff made up the core of the scientific team with herpetologist Karl P. Schmidt was appointed Head of Scientific Staff; Walter A. Weber, ornithologist and illustrator; and Frank C. Wonder, taxidermist and preparator. Also joining the crew was Harvard bacteriologist and immunologist William L. Moss, who served as a physician and wanted to study tropical diseases and blood types while on the expedition. Dr Albert W Herre, ichthyologist and professor at Stanford University, also joined the expedition. Sidney N. Shurcliff, a friend of Cornelius Crane, photographed and filmed much of the expedition. He was credited as being one of the first photographers to successfully film underwater coral, which he did during the expedition at some reefs at the Tropics of Capricorn. While only Shurcliff was documented as official photographer, five men are known to have taken over 500 photographs of people, art, architecture, and everyday life in New Guinea. Murry N. Fairbank and Charles R. Peavy, friends of Cornelius Crane, also accompanied the expedition.

== Expedition journey ==
=== Illyria construction and departure ===
The yacht Illyria was built with the expedition in mind. Cornelius Crane Sr. gifted its construction to his son. The yacht was built to accommodate the space required for the scientific expedition. On September 14, 1928, the Illyria was brought from Italy to New York. The yacht set sail the next month, after it had been stocked with the necessary supplies, on November 16. The route of this expedition recalls that followed by Darwin as recorded in his Voyage of the Beagle.

=== Route ===
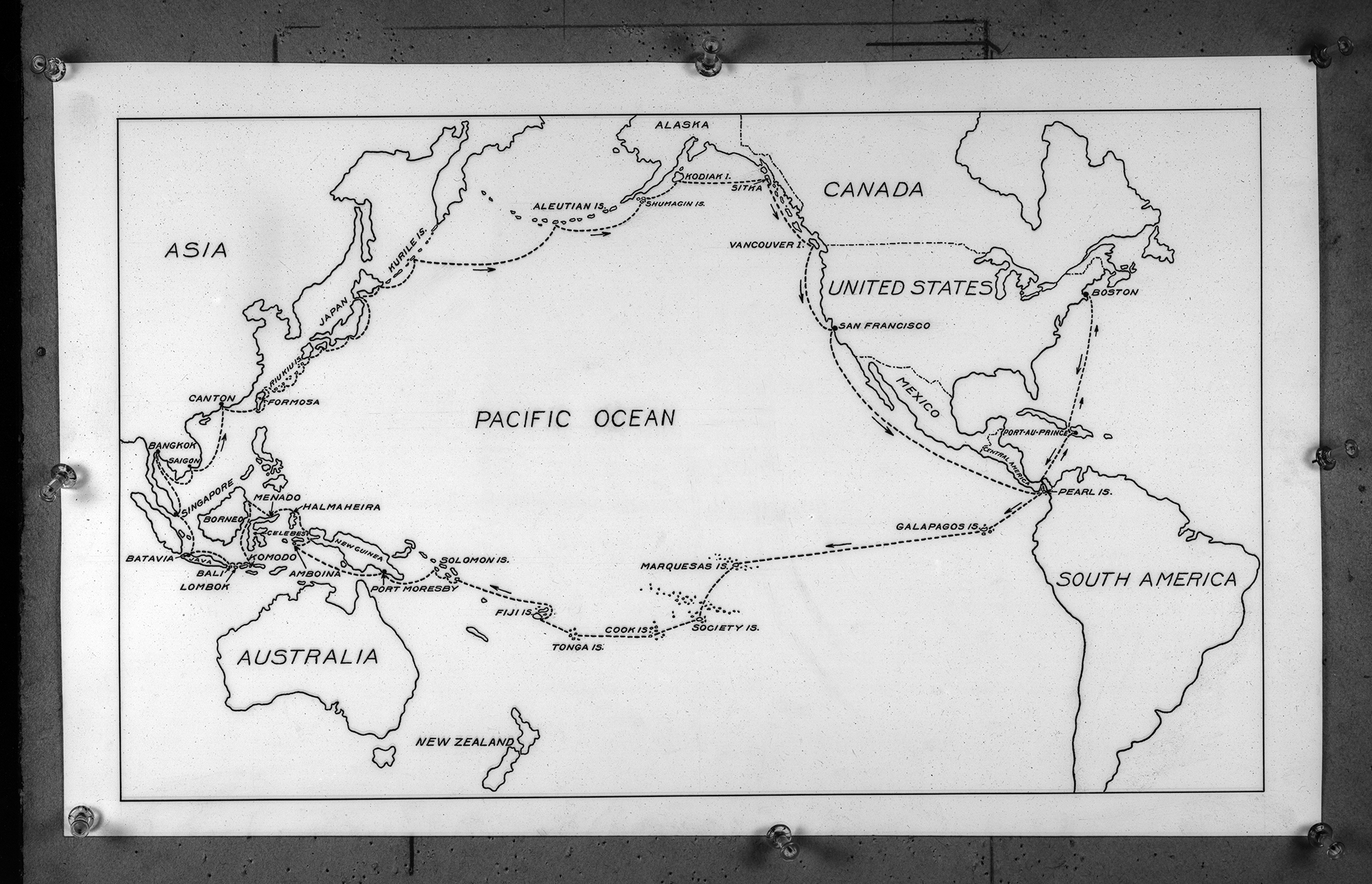
Line drawing Map of Pacific Ocean islands itinerary of Crane Expedition. Field Museum of Natural History. CSZ59360

Throughout the route, the Illyria experienced trouble with radio messages.

- Bermuda
- Cuba
- Haiti
- Panama
- Cocos
- Galapagos Islands
- Polynesia: islands visited included the Marquesas Islands, Low Archipelago, Tahiti, Moorea, Society Island
- Fiji Islands
- New Hebrides
- Solomon Island
- New Guinea: islands visited includes New Britain
- Celebes
- Borneo: After Borneo all the scientists except Dr. Moss went home to America by steamer
- Bali
- Java

=== Illyria return ===
After 11 months, the Illyria arrived at Boston on October 16, 1929. It was a total of 32,000 nautical miles.

== Notable collections ==
The specimens collected during this expedition were then given to the Field Museum of Natural History upon their return. On the expedition there was a total of 881 mammals, 1,200 birds, 12,000 fishes, 1,075 insects, 500 crustaceans, 300 mollusks, 100 worms, 50 echinoderms, and 2,008 reptiles and amphibians collected.

=== Birds ===
At the time of the expedition the cassowary was still a fairly new "discovery" for the Field Museum of Natural History. More information and research was desired to be collected on cassowaries. The Crane Pacific Expedition collected some specimen of cassowaries. Those on board the Illyria talked about consuming the cassowary meat during the expedition.

=== Fish ===
There was one new family, seven new genera, one new subgenus, and 51 new species collected.

=== Mammals ===
Frank C. Wonder, collector and taxidermist on the expedition, collected all four of the only specimens recorded of the Darwin's Galápagos mouse on the Galapagos Islands from the 12–16 January 1929.

=== Reptiles and amphibians ===
The New Guinea Crocodile (Crocodylus novaeguineae) was announced to be a new species discovered by the Field Museum of Natural History.
