= Richard T. Crane =

American industrialist (1832–1912)

- Born: May 15, 1832; Paterson, New Jersey, U.S.
- Died: January 8, 1912 (aged 79); Chicago, Illinois, U.S.
- Resting place: Oak Hill Cemetery, Lake Geneva, Wisconsin

Richard Teller Crane I (May 15, 1832 – January 8, 1912) was the founder of R.T. Crane & Bro., a Chicago-based brass-goods and plumbing supply manufacturer, later Crane Co.

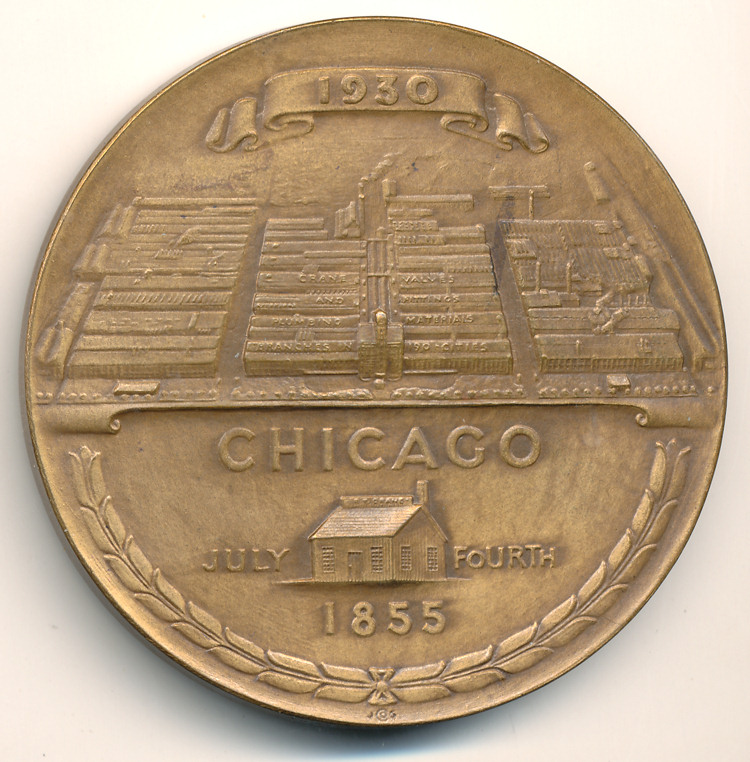
Views factories RT Crane in Chicago in 1855 and 1930

== Early life ==
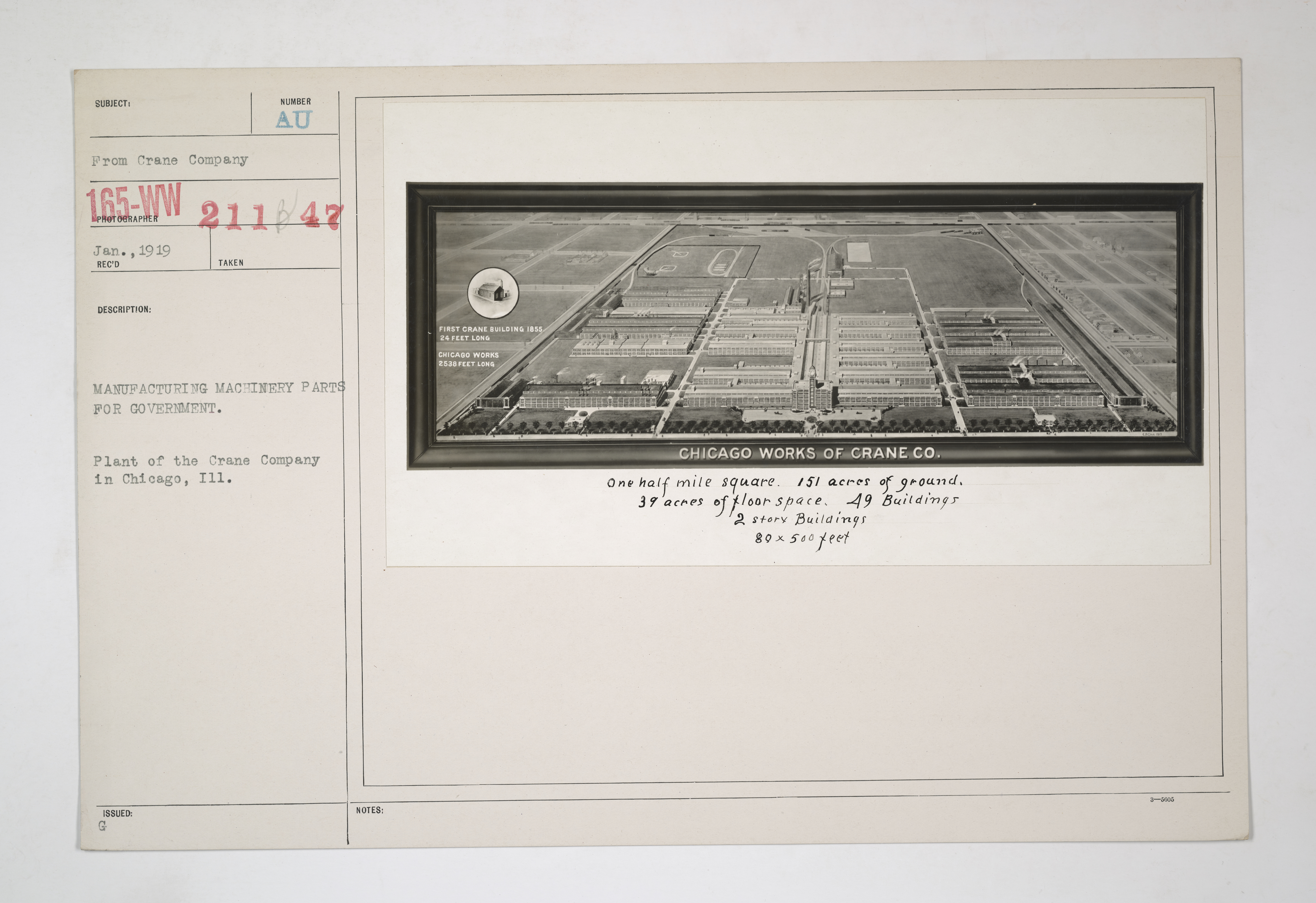
Crane factory on Kedzie Avenue in Chicago circa 1917

Richard T. Crane was born on May 15, 1832, in Paterson, New Jersey, on Tottoway Road, near Passaic Falls to Timothy Botchford Crane and Maria Ryerson. His father was a builder-architect. Crane only had two or three years of formal schooling before embarking on a series of factory jobs, first in Patterson, and then New York City. He lost his job in the Panic of 1854, and moved to Chicago in 1855 at the suggestion of his uncle, lumber dealer Martin Ryerson.

== R.T. Crane & Bro. ==
Richard and his brother Charles soon formed R.T. Crane & Bro., which manufactured and sold brass goods and plumbing supplies. The new company soon won contracts to supply pipe and steam-heating equipment in large public buildings such as the Cook County courthouse and the state prison at Joliet. In 1865, R. T. Crane and Brother was incorporated and the name of the company was changed to the Northwestern Manufacturing Company. It began to manufacture a full line of industrial valves and fittings in cast iron, malleable iron and brass. By 1870, when it employed about 160 people, it was making elevators as well. After the Chicago Fire of 1871, the company decided to expand its operations. Just after the firm became Crane Bros. Manufacturing Co. in 1872, it employed as many as 700 men and boys and manufactured over $1 million worth of products per year.

In 1890, when it had sales branches in Omaha, Kansas City, Los Angeles and Philadelphia, the company changed its name to Crane Co. By this time, Crane was supplying much of the pipe used for the large central heating systems in Chicago's new skyscrapers, and it was also selling the enameled cast-iron products that were soon found in bathrooms in residences across the country.

In 1910, when Crane had begun to manufacture in a plant at Bridgeport, Connecticut, its Chicago plants employed more than 5,000 people. A large new Chicago plant on South Kedzie Avenue was built in the 1910s. During the 1920s, when Crane expanded overseas, the company was the world's leading manufacturer of valves and fittings. During the next few decades, Crane continued to employ thousands of Chicago-area residents at its Kedzie Avenue plant, and the company's annual sales rose to over US$300 million by the mid-1950s.

=== Contraction in Chicago ===
In 1959, however, the company was acquired by Thomas Mellon Evans, its first owner who was not a member of the Crane family. Evans proceeded to turn Crane into a global conglomerate that made aerospace equipment as well as plumbing supplies; the headquarters eventually moved from Chicago to Bridgeport. By the mid-1970s, Crane employed only about 1,000 people in the Chicago area. By the end of the century, Crane was doing annual sales of about $2 billion, but it was no longer a leading company in the city in which it was born. The Crane Plumbing unit was sold off in 1990 and it became a unit of American Standard Brands.

== Innovations in education ==
Crane was an advocate of new ways of educating children. In 1886, he was the vice president of the Chicago Manual Training School, which provided one of the first vocational education programs in the city. This was a private school serving high school students. By 1891, the Chicago public school system was offering vocational training at English High School. In that year, Crane sponsored demonstration programs in one of the city's public grade schools. One of these extended vocational training to the sixth, seventh, and eighth grades. The other demonstration added a kindergarten program.

However, he did not support all forms of learning. In the final decade of his life, he was a vocal opponent of college, and higher learning in general. His views appeared in a series of pamphlets he published, as well as articles in the trade publication he owned, The Valve. He strongly criticized fellow industrialists, for example Andrew Carnegie, who were donating millions of dollars to support higher education.

The Chicago Board of Education eventually named its manual training high school after Crane, in recognition of Crane's support of the public schools. Ironically, that high school has since changed to a college preparatory program.

== Personal life ==
Crane was married three times, the last at age 73 to 35-year-old Emily Hutchison. His children were: philanthropist and diplomat Charles Richard (b. 1858); Herbert Prentice (b. 1861); Katharine H. (Gartz) (b. 1865); May Ryerson (Russell) (b. 1866); Frances Williams (Lillie) (b. 1869); Emily Rockwell (Chadbourne) (b. 1871); Richard Teller Crane Jr. (b. 1873), who built the Castle Hill estate in Ipswich, Massachusetts. His grandson, Cornelius Vanderbilt Crane, was an explorer and philanthropist. His grandson, Richard Teller Crane II (b. 1882) was the first United States diplomat accredited to Czechoslovakia, under the Woodrow Wilson administration.

Crane was a member of the famous Jekyll Island Club (aka The Millionaires Club) on Jekyll Island, Georgia. Crane lost two nieces, Barbara and Mary Gartz, at the Iroquois Theatre fire in Chicago in 1903. He hired fire insurance expert, engineer John Ripley Freeman to conduct a study to determine the various causes of the fire.

The mother of actor/comedian Chevy Chase's mother, Cathalene, was the step-daughter of Cornelius Vanderbilt Crane, grandson of Richard T. Crane. Chase was never related in any way to the Crane family, as Cornelius divorced Chevy's grandmother and disinherited his mother.

Crane died on January 8, 1912, in Chicago, at the age of 89. He was buried in Oak Hill Cemetery in Lake Geneva, Wisconsin.
