= Willenburg =

- Schlössle
- Schiltach
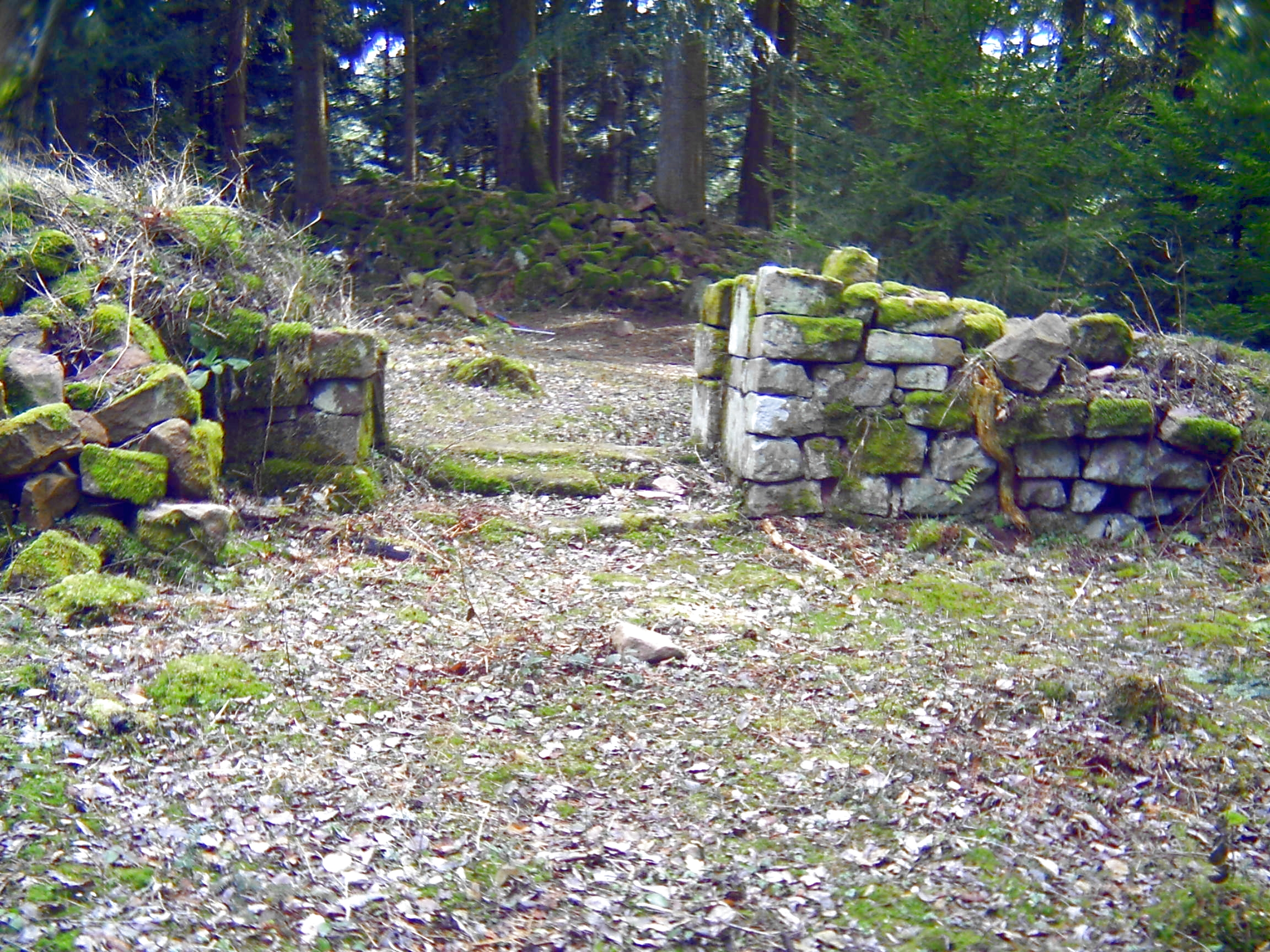

Site information
- Type: hill castle
- Code: DE-BW
- Condition: ruin

Location
- Coordinates: 48.285580°N 8.372061°E
- Area: 36 m × 20 m (118 ft × 66 ft)
- Height: 656.1 m above sea level (NN)

Site history
- Built: around 1100

The Willenburg, also called the Schlössle, is a ruined hill castle near Schiltach in the county of Rottweil in the German state of Baden-Württemberg.

== Location ==
The castle lies around 2 kilometres outside Schiltach at 656.1 m above sea level (NN) above the old pass road to Rottweil, the so-called Schiltacher Steige, in the direction of Aichhalden in the Black Forest.

== History ==
The ruin is the remnant of a high medieval castle that had been forgotten, but was rediscovered in 1959 by the Friends of Nature from Schiltach following speculation of its existence. It was probably built around 1100, its owners initially being either the first dukes of Teck, who were a side line of the House of Zähringen, or even the dukes of Zähringen, themselves.

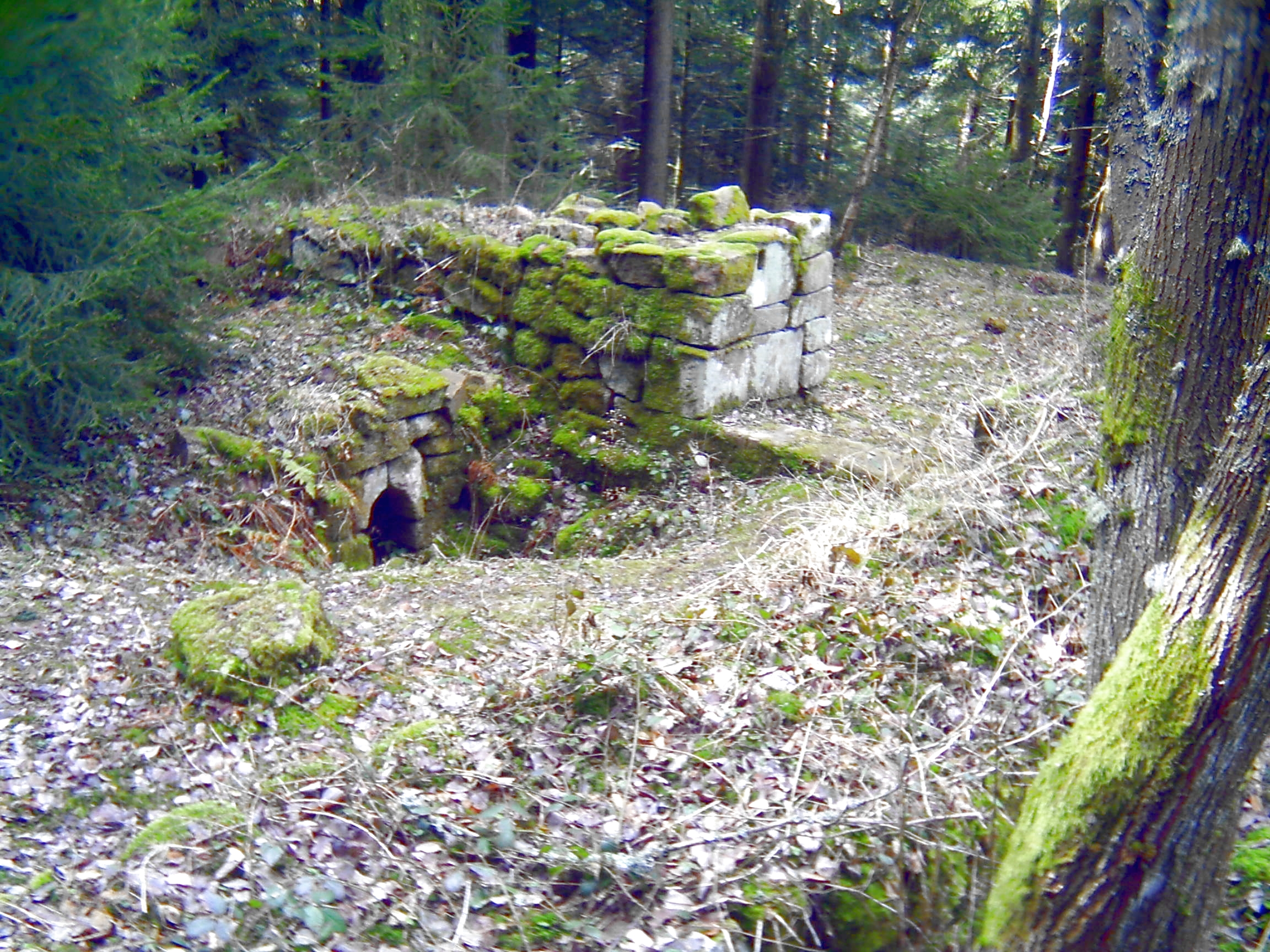
Stone baking oven at the Willenburg

The Willenburg was built to cater for travellers. Road tolls were raised here as the old transport route over to Rottweil was monitored here.

So the Willenburg may also be seen as the predecessor to the castle and town of Schiltach, which took on these functions in 1250. A town with its associated castle was able to carry out these tasks more effectively.

From that time the Willenburg fell into decay.

So in the Late Middle Ages it was already being referred to as the Willenburg Burgstall, which indicates a lost or levelled castle.

== Description ==
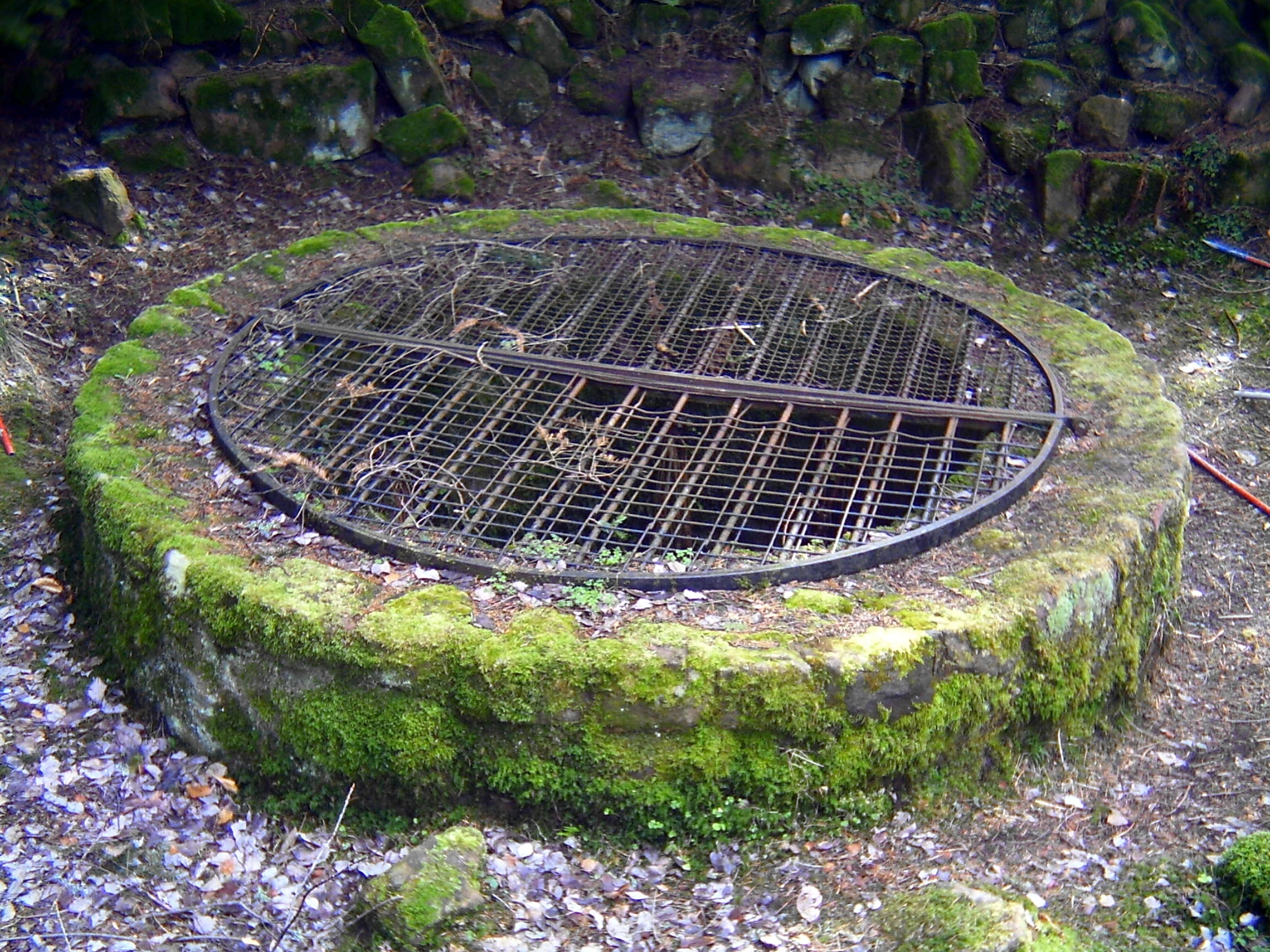
The 30.3-metre-deep castle well

During excavations between 1959 and 1970 the foundations and wall sections of a castle were uncovered whose dimensions were 36 by 20 metres. Pieces of pottery were also found that enabled the castle to be dated. Today the wall remains, ramparts and a 30.3-metre-deep castle well are visible.

The Museum am Markt in Schiltach has an exhibition about the excavations on the Willenburg.

== Literature ==
- Friedrich-Wilhelm Krahe: Burgen des deutschen Mittelalters – Grundriss-Lexikon. Sonderausgabe, Flechsig Verlag, Würzburg 2000, ISBN 3-88189-360-1, p. 670;
