= Sphenomorphus cranei =

Conservation status
- Least Concern (IUCN 3.1)

Scientific classification
- Kingdom: Animalia
- Phylum: Chordata
- Class: Reptilia
- Order: Squamata
- Family: Scincidae
- Genus: Sphenomorphus
- Species: S. cranei

Binomial name
- Sphenomorphus cranei Schmidt, 1932

Species of lizard

Sphenomorphus cranei, also known commonly as Crane's skink and Crane's forest skink, is a species of lizard in the family Scincidae. The species is endemic to the Solomon Islands.

== Etymology ==
The specific name, cranei, is in honor of American philanthropist Cornelius Vanderbilt Crane.

== Habitat ==
The preferred natural habitat of S. cranei is forest, at altitudes of 100–1,000 m (330–3,280 ft).

== Reproduction ==
S. cranei is oviparous.
