= Hansgrohe =

German sanitary fittings manufacturer

Hansgrohe SE
- Company type: Societas Europaea
- Industry: Manufacturing
- Founded: 1901
- Founder: Hans Grohe
- Headquarters: Schiltach, Baden-Württemberg, Germany
- Key people: Hans Jürgen Kalmbach (Chairman of the executive board); Klaus F. Jaenecke (Chairman of the supervisory board); Richard O'Reagan (Deputy chairman of the supervisory board)
- Products: Plumbing materials
- Brands: Axor; Hansgrohe
- Revenue: €1.077 billion (2017)
- Number of employees: 4,962, about 40% outside of Germany (2017)
- Parent: Masco Corporation
- Website: www.hansgrohe-group.com

Hansgrohe SE is a German plumbing materials and sanitary fittings manufacturer. It was founded by Hans Grohe in 1901, in Schiltach, Baden-Württemberg, Germany. Hansgrohe is one of the world's largest shower head, hand shower and tap suppliers, next to competitors such as Grohe and Kohler.

Hansgrohe is not to be confused with the Grohe AG, another German sanitary fittings manufacturer, which was founded by Hans Grohe's son Friedrich.

== Background ==
Hansgrohe has two major shareholders: The family of Klaus Grohe, the founders' youngest son, holds 32%, Masco Corporation 68%. Hans Jürgen Kalmbach became chairman of Hansgrohe in 2018. The company sells its products under two brand names: Axor and hansgrohe.

In 2017, Hansgrohe reported sales of 1.077 billion Euro (2016: 1.029 billion Euro). The company employs about 4,962 people, 40% outside of Germany. Hansgrohe manufactures its products in factories in the United States, Germany, France and China. With 34 subsidiaries and 21 sales offices the company is present all over the world. Hansgrohe exports its products into more than 140 countries.

== Foundation and history ==
In 1901, Hans Grohe, born in Luckenwalde near Berlin on May 14, 1871, founded the company in Schiltach, in the German Black Forest region. As a three-man operation, the company began producing metal pressing products, e.g. parts of watches, brass pans and sheet metal showers, but soon concentrated on sanitary metal ware. Export started with the first delivery to Amsterdam, Netherlands in January 1907. By 1919, 3 office clerks and 48 production employees worked for the company.

Hans Grohe started to use a new brass pressing procedure in 1929 and began to chromium-plate his products in 1930. Four years later, his son Friedrich Grohe left the company and took over a company in Hemer, North Rhine-Westphalia, in 1936. While his father Hans concentrated on showers and draining technology, Friedrich Grohe focused on fittings. The company today is known as Grohe AG.

In 1968, Klaus Grohe, the youngest son of Hans Grohe, joined the father's company and took over its management in 1975. In 1977, he introduced the word and figurative mark Hansgrohe. Under his company leadership, Hansgrohe started to work with external designers in the late 1960s, including Hartmut Esslinger (frog design) and later on Phoenix Design and Philippe Starck. Klaus Grohe also reached out to explore new market segments: In 1981 Hansgrohe began producing faucets and introduced a greywater recycling system in 2001.

In 1984, the Friedrich Grohe family, one of the three shareholders at the time, together with the Hans Grohe Junior family, and the Klaus Grohe family, sold their third of shares to the US investment company Masco Corporation from Taylor, Michigan. In 1999, the Hans Grohe Junior family equally sold their shares to the Masco Corporation, making them majority shareholder, and leaving the Klaus Grohe family as the only family shareholder of the company with today 32% of the shares. In 2012, Hansgrohe became a European stock corporation (Societas Europaea SE), which is not listed on the stock exchange.

After having been member of the management board for 33 years, Klaus Grohe took over the position as director of the supervisory board in 2008. Since 2015, he has been honorary chairman of the board. In August 2018, Hans Jürgen Kalmbach became chairman of Hansgrohe, following Thorsten Klapproth. Two grandsons of company founder Hans Grohe, Richard and Philippe Grohe, were active in the operative business until October 2016. Since then, the founding family supports the company exclusively from a shareholder position, through their representation in the supervisory board of Hansgrohe SE.

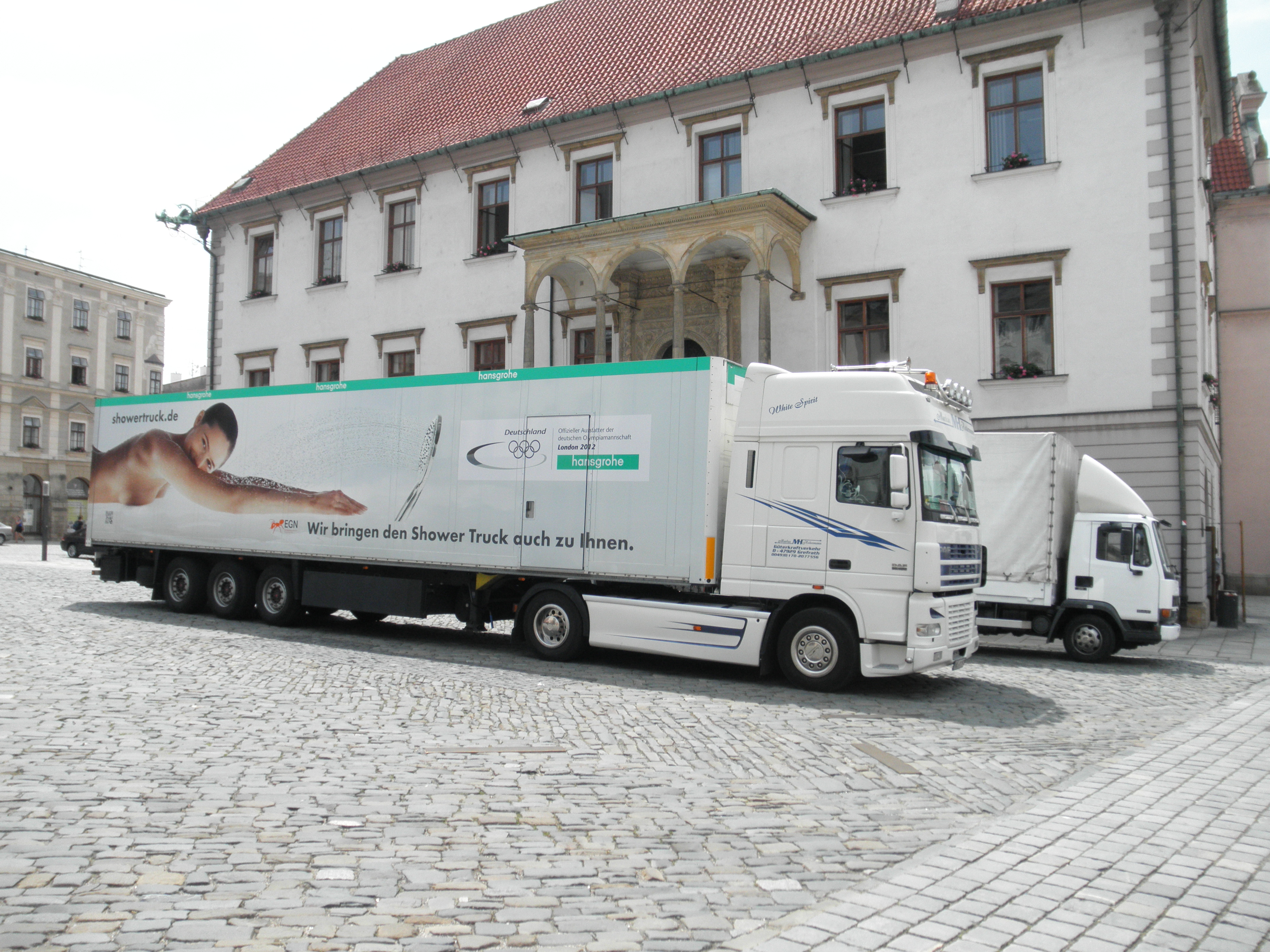
DAF truck with showers by Hansgrohe

== Products ==
The product range of Hansgrohe includes:

- Fittings
- Showers and Shower heads
- Kitchen and Bathroom Faucets
- Bathroom accessories

Hansgrohe products have been awarded several design awards, including the prestigious iF Design Award 2016, the red dot design award: product design 2016 and the Design Award of the Federal Republic of Germany 2012.

Hansgrohe has registered about 2500 patents until the end of 2015. Among the most important inventions are: automatical drainage systems (1934), the wallbar (1953), the hand shower with an adjustable water jet (1968), the kitchen faucet with pull-out handspray (1984) as well as technologies to reduce the waterflow through air addition (2004) and activating / deactivating the water flow with a push-button (2011). In 2015, Hansgrohe held 24 patents, 180 designs and 93 brands.

== Designer ==
- Antonio Citterio
- Jean-Marie Massaud
- Philippe Starck
- Patricia Urquiola
- Phoenix Design
- Ronan and Erwan Bouroullec
- Nendo Design
- Front Design
- Barber & Osgerby

== Museum and Aquademie ==
Hansgrohe established a museum for water, bathrooms and design in 1997, at its German headquarters in Schiltach. It displays the evolution of private bathrooms over the past 100 years and shows the company's development in the course of historical events.

At its US headquarters in Alpharetta, Georgia, Hansgrohe runs a training and interactive product center, the Aquademie.

== Sponsoring ==
Together with extractor manufacturer Bora, Hansgrohe supports the cycling worldtour team Bora-Hansgrohe as one of the main sponsors beginning in 2017.

== See also ==
- Grohe, another German plumbing manufacturer, founded by Hans Grohe's son Friedrich
