= Crane Co. =

American industrial manufacturer

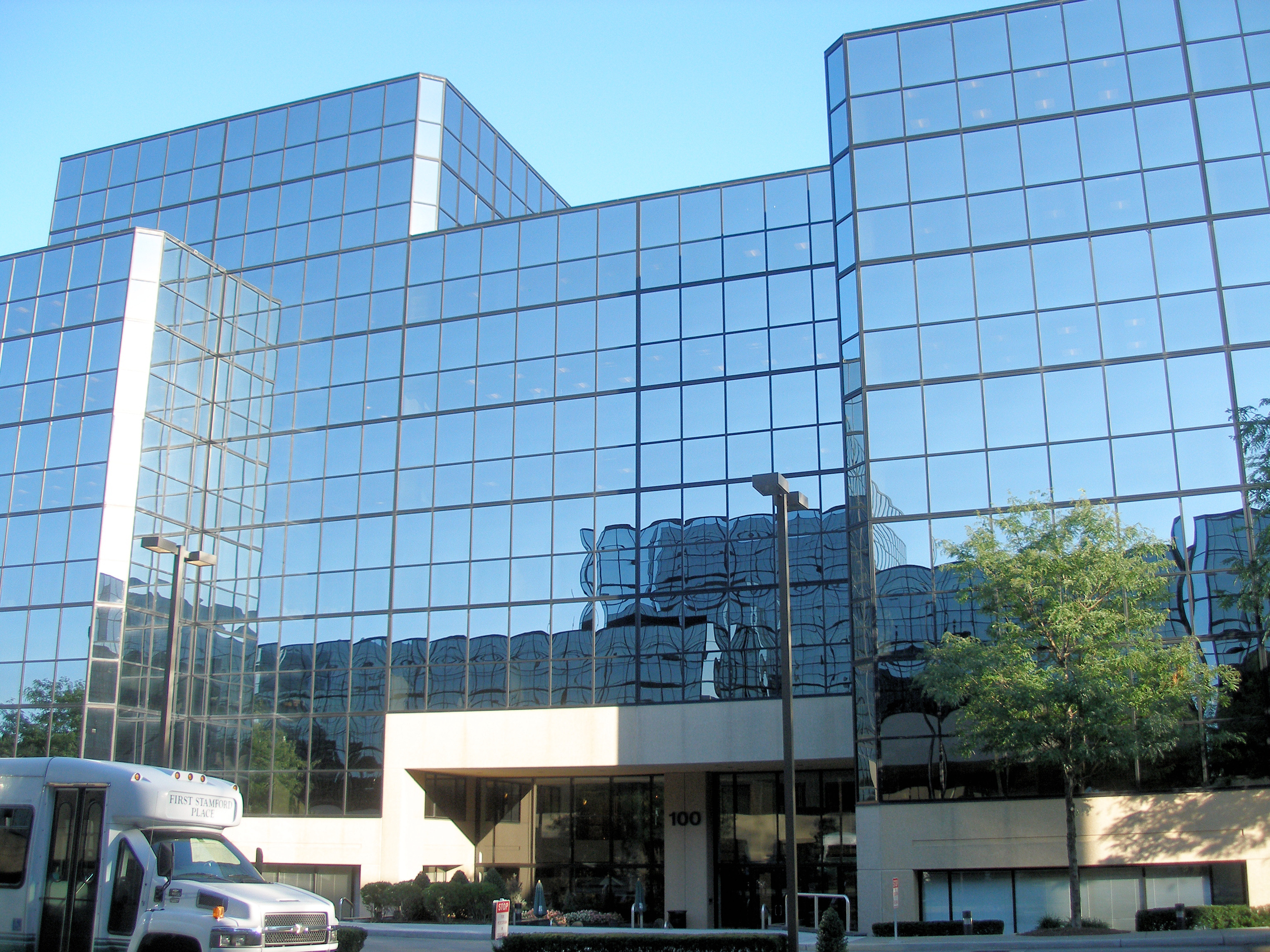
- Crane Holdings headquarters in Stamford
- Formerly: Crane Co.
- Type: Public company
- Traded as: NYSE: CR; S&P 400 component
- Industry: Industrial conglomerate
- Founded: 1855; 171 years ago in Chicago, Illinois, U.S.
- Founder: Richard T. Crane
- Headquarters: Stamford, Connecticut, U.S.,
- Key people: Robert S. Evans, Chairman; Max Mitchell, President & CEO
- Products: Aerospace & Electronics, Engineered Materials, Payment and Merchandising Technologies, Fluid Handling, Sensing & Control Systems
- Revenue: US$3.0 billion (2021)
- Number of employees: 11,000
- Website: craneco.com

Crane Co. is an American industrial products company based in Stamford, Connecticut. Founded by Richard Teller Crane in 1855, it became one of the leading manufacturers of bathroom fixtures in the United States, until 1990, when that division was sold off. In 1960 it began the process of becoming a holding company with a diverse portfolio. Its business segments are Aerospace & Electronics, Engineered Materials (fiberglass paneling and telecom equipment), Fluid Handling, and Controls (sensing and control systems). Industries served by these segments include chemical industries, commercial construction, food and beverage, general and commercial aviation, and power generation.

The company was best known to the consumer public for its bathroom fixtures, and more recently, its vending machines. However, it has divested itself of both of these public-facing businesses.

== History ==
In 1855, brothers Richard and Charles Crane formed R. T. Crane & Bro., which manufactured and sold brass goods and plumbing supplies in Chicago, Illinois. The new company soon won contracts to supply pipe and steam-heating equipment in large public buildings such as the Cook County courthouse and the state prison at Joliet. In 1865, R. T. Crane and Brother was incorporated, and the name of the company was changed to the Northwestern Manufacturing Company. It began to manufacture a full line of industrial valves and fittings in cast iron, malleable iron and brass. By 1870, when it employed about 160 people, it was making elevators as well. After the Chicago Fire of 1871, the company decided to expand its operations. Just after the firm became Crane Bros. Manufacturing Co. in 1872, it employed as many as 700 men and boys and manufactured over $1 million worth of products per year.

In 1890, when it had sales branches in Omaha, Kansas City, Los Angeles and Philadelphia, the company changed its name to Crane Co. By this time, Crane was supplying much of the pipe used for the large central heating systems in Chicago's new skyscrapers, and it was also selling the enameled cast-iron products that were soon found in bathrooms in residences across the country.

In 1910, Crane had begun to manufacture at a plant in Bridgeport, Connecticut. A large new Chicago plant on South Kedzie Avenue was built in the 'teens which employed more than 5,000 people. During the 1920s, when Crane expanded overseas, the company was the world's leading manufacturer of valves and fittings. Company sales rose to over US$300 million per annum by the mid-1950s.

In 1959, the Crane family sold their control of the company, and the new owners began to turn Crane into a global conglomerate that made aerospace equipment in addition to their traditional place in the plumbing industry. Headquarters eventually moved from Chicago to Bridgeport. The Crane Plumbing unit was sold off in 1990. Crane Plumbing is now a division of American Standard.

In 2017, Crane Co acquired the similarly named but unrelated company Crane Currency. In 2023, Crane Co spun off its Crane Currency and Crane Payment Innovations subsidiaries, forming a new company, Crane NXT.

== Products ==
- Controls (diagnostic, measurement, and control devices)
- Industrial
  - Aerospace components (sensing and control systems)
  - Engineered materials (Fiberglass Reinforced Plastic Wall & Ceiling Systems, Exteriors of RV sidewalls, Transportation Interiors)
  - Fluid handling equipment (valves and pumps)

== Subsidiaries ==
- Crane Aerospace & Electronics
  - Aerospace Group (Lynnwood, Washington)
    - Burbank, California (Hydro-Aire and P. L. Porter)
    - Elyria, Ohio (Lear Romec)
    - Lynnwood, Washington (ELDEC)
    - Lyon, France (ELDEC France)
  - Electronics Group (Redmond, Washington)
    - Beverly, Massachusetts (Signal Technology)
    - Chandler, Arizona (Signal Technology)
    - Fort Walton Beach, Florida (Keltec)
    - West Caldwell, New Jersey (Merrimac Industries)
- Crane Composites
  - Florence, Kentucky (Lasco)
  - Goshen, Indiana (Noble & Fabwel)
  - Joliet, Illinois (Kemlite)
  - Jonesboro (Kemlite)
- Crane Electronics (headquarters located in Redmond, Washington)
  - Albuquerque, New Mexico (General Technology Corporation)
  - Beverly, Massachusetts (Signal Technology)
  - Chandler, Arizona (Signal Technology)
  - Fort Walton Beach, Florida (Keltec)
  - Lynnwood, Washington (ELDEC)
  - Lyon, France (ELDEC France)
  - Redmond, Washington (Interpoint)
  - Taiwan (Interpoint)
- Fluid Handling
  - Crane ChemPharma Flow Solutions
  - Crane Energy Flow Solutions
  - Crane Australia
  - Crane Stockham Valve Ltd. (Belfast)
  - Crane Limited
  - Crane Process Flow Technologies (CPFT)
  - Crane Pumps and Systems (CP&S)
  - Crane Supply
  - Crane Valves North America (CVNA)
  - Pacific Valves
  - Resistoflex Industrial
  - Valve Services
  - Xomox
  - Crane Nuclear, Inc.
  - Friedrich Krombach GmbH Armaturenwerke
  - Armature d.o.o. (Slovenia)
  - Croning Livarna d.o.o.(Slovenia)
  - W.T. Armatur GmbH
  - Controls
    - Azonix
    - Barksdale
    - Crane Environmental (with brands Cochrane, Chicago Heater and Environmental Products) - since divested to Newterra
    - Fort Lauderdale, Florida (Dynalco)
    - WMS

== Litigation ==
- In a 1917 U.S. Supreme Court case Looney v. Crane Co., the company was involved against the state of Texas.

The Court held "that the franchise and permit taxes both violated the due process clause of the Fourteenth Amendment and directly burdened interstate commerce. A suit to enjoin state officials from enforcing an unconstitutional tax is not a suit against the state." The meaning of this ruling is that States are not allowed to add burdens to corporations if it impacts interstate commerce. This case has been cited in over 20 further Supreme Court rulings.

== Asbestos Liabilities ==
As of December 31, 2007, Crane Co. faced 80,999 asbestos liability claims. In 2007, the company set aside $390 million for predicted asbestos liability costs through 2017.

== See also ==
- List of S&P 400 companies
