= Grohe =

German plumbing fixtures manufacturer

- Type: Subsidiary
- Industry: Manufacturing
- Founded: 1936; 90 years ago
- Founder: Friedrich Grohe
- Headquarters: Düsseldorf, Germany
- Area served: Worldwide
- Key people: Thomas Fuhr (CEO)
- Products: Plumbing fixture
- Revenue: €1.35 billion (2017)
- Number of employees: 5,831 (2017)
- Parent: Lixil Group
- Website: grohe.com

Grohe is a German plumbing fixtures manufacturer with its registered office in Hemer and headquarters in Düsseldorf. In 2014 Grohe became part of the Japanese Lixil Group. The company generated consolidated sales revenues of €1.35 billion in 2017.

Grohe is distinct from Hansgrohe, another German sanitary fittings manufacturer.

== History ==
=== 1911 until 1990: family-owned ===
The company started as a ferric hardware factory in 1911 under the name Berkenhoff & Paschedag, located in Hemer, Germany; it was taken over by Friedrich Grohe in 1936, who focused on sanitary faucets only. Before that, Friedrich used to work for his father's company Hansgrohe, founded in 1901. The first order from outside of Germany came in 1938. In 1948, the company was renamed to Friedrich Grohe Armaturenfabrik. In 1956, Grohe purchased Carl Nestler Armaturenfabrik, with a factory in Lahr/Schwarzwald. In the same year, the company launched the Skalatherm, an automatic mixing valve with integrated thermostat. In 1961, the company set up its first subsidiary abroad, in France. The following year Grohe acquired exclusive rights to produce the Moen Mixing Faucet, which mixes hot and cold water with a single lever. In 1965, the company expanded into Austria and founded its third subsidiary abroad in Italy in 1967.

In 1968, Friedrich Grohe sold a 51% stake, there were some additions to the Lahr production site, and a new logistics department was opened at Hemer-Edelburg.

In 1983, the company's products were exclusively distributed in the Middle East, the East Mediterranean as well as North and West Africa by Grome Marketing. Later in 1993, Grohe acquired 50% of Grome, resulting in a joint venture between Mesma Holdings Ltd. and Grohe AG.

=== 1990s and 2000s: involvement of investors ===
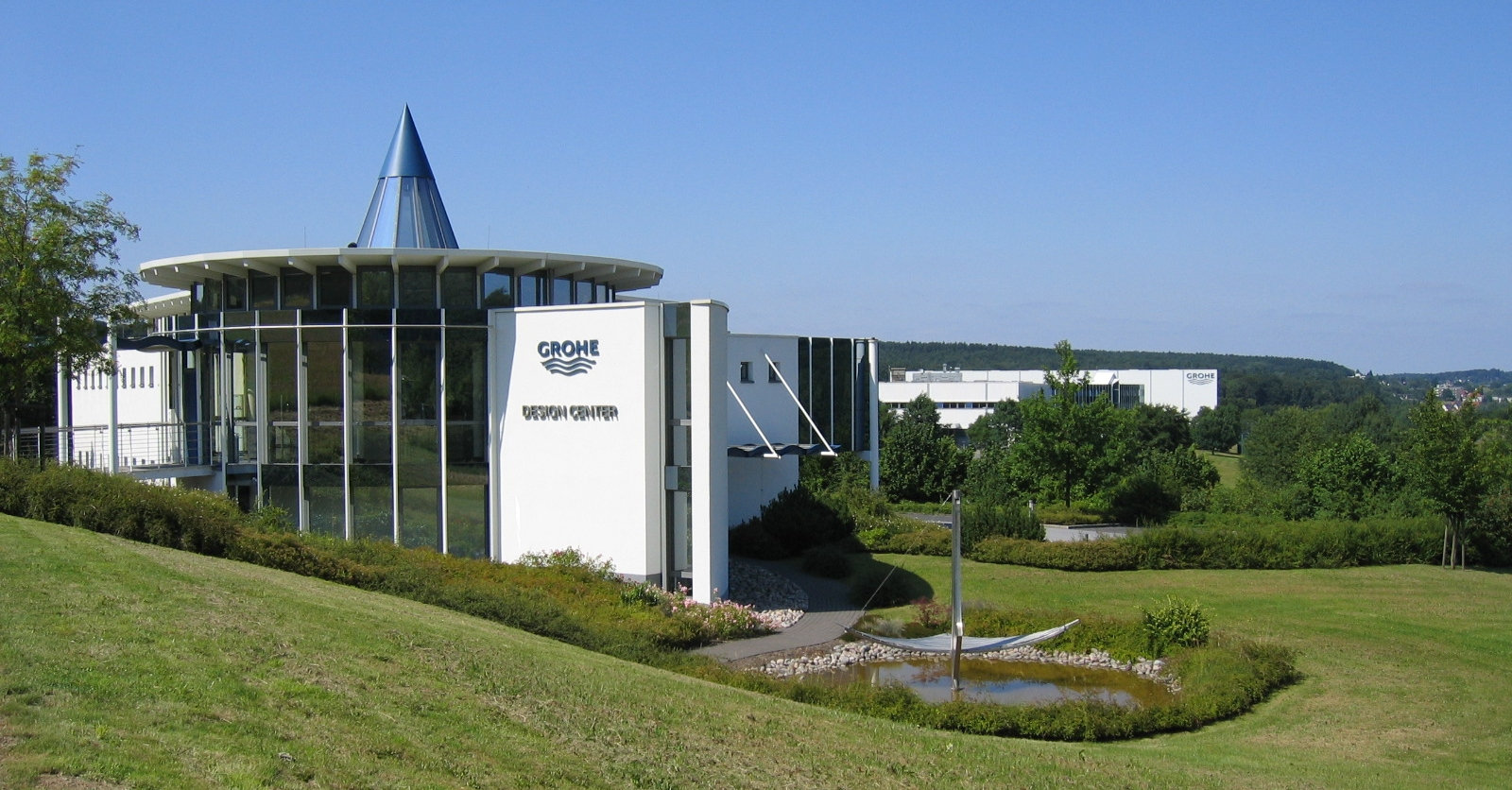
Grohe Technology Center in Hemer-Edelburg

In 1991, the company bought two other producers of faucets: Herzberger Armaturen GmbH from the Brandenburg region and Armaturenfabrik H. D. Eichelberg & Co. GmbH at Iserlohn in Westphalia. Grohe was also restructured as a public limited company. By taking over the DAL Group in 1994, the company acquired a production site in Porta Westfalica, Westphalia; at the same time, the company also acquired Tempress Ltd. of Mississauga in Ontario (Canada). At the Hemer site, new technology and factory control facilities were opened. 1996 saw the company expand to Portugal and Thailand. A new design centre followed at the Hemer site in 1997.

In 1998, a group of investors working with BC Partners bought all available Grohe shares and delisted the company in the following year, making the Grohe Holding GmbH company, owned by BC partners, into the majority owner of Grohe AG in 1999. BC partners sold the company to a consortium of investors from the Texas Pacific Group and CSFB Private Equity (a subsidiary of the Swiss Credit Suisse banking group) five years later in 2004.

In 2005, Franz Müntefering, chairman of the then ruling Social Democratic Party of Germany (SPD), sparked a debate on capitalism by designating foreign private equity firms as "locusts", with TPG-owned Grohe as his main example. The "locust" metaphor remained popular in German politics and media for years. In contrast, a report commissioned by the German government's finance ministry in 2008 cited Grohe as an example for a successful turnaround.

The company's sales and profit figures had been stagnating for years, leading to a programme of savings in 2007. Around 950 production jobs were announced to be cut at sites in Germany, and the Herzberg factory was closed; the sites in Thailand and Portugal were expanded considerably and around 500 new jobs created. Through 2008, investments totaling €200 million, of which around two thirds was invested in Germany in the areas of production technology and logistics.

=== Since 2010 ===
In 2010, Grohe stated that it was Europe's biggest manufacturer of sanitary fittings and had 8% of the worldwide market. The German market made up roughly 15% of overall sales. Grohe AG was owned almost 100% by Grohe Holding GmbH (there were still some minority shareholders from the period in which Grohe AG was listed on the stock market). Grohe Holding GmbH is owned by investors.

In June 2010, the European Commission ruled that European manufacturers of sanitary fittings had operated a cartel between 1992 and 2002, and imposed a collective fine of €622m, of which Grohe's share was €54.8m. The Grohe board of directors, which took up business after the period under investigation, introduced awareness programmes about competition law and a zero-tolerance policy towards price-fixing.

In early 2011, Grohe acquired a majority stake (72%) in the leading Chinese sanitary fittings producer Joyou, making a successful public takeover bid. In 2012, Grohe held a 72% stake in Joyou.

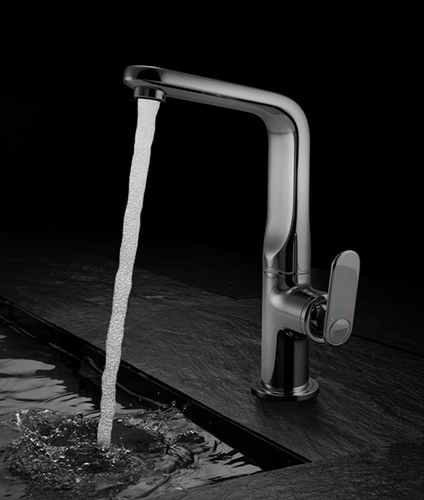
Grohe Kitchen Faucet Veris 1

In 2012, Grohe AG's revenues increased by 21% to €1,405m; operating profits improved by 18% to reach €273m, representing a return on revenue of 19.4%.

In May 2013, David Haines, chairman of Grohe, confirmed that, although the company was examining all options for ending investor involvement, no concrete plans had been made. Capital market experts estimated that Grohe would be valued at up to four billion euros if it were to return to the stock market.

In September 2013, it was announced that Grohe had received the largest ever investment from a Japanese company in Germany, becoming almost entirely owned by the Japanese building materials company Lixil Group and the Development Bank of Japan, after a €3 billion deal for 87.5% of the firm. Grohe was taken over by Lixil and the Development Bank of Japan in January 2014.

In February 2017, the company's revenues accounted €965m during the first nine months of the fiscal year. Grohe said that their solid growth was based on their international market share and increasing sales in Germany, with Grohe products available in 150 countries.

In May 2017, Grohe announced the takeover of the former joint venture Grome.

In September 2017, Grohe was listed in the Change the World ranking of the business magazine Fortune as one of 50 international companies whose strategy had a positive impact on society.

== Controversies ==
Grohe has faced criticism for continuing its operations in Russia despite the ongoing geopolitical tensions and sanctions imposed following the Russian invasion of Ukraine. According to the Leave Russia project, Grohe maintains a presence in Russia, which has raised concerns regarding the company's ethical practices and alignment with international standards.

== Corporate structure ==
The registered office of Grohe AG is in Hemer, and the head office in Düsseldorf, Germany. Grohe AG is a subsidiary of Grohe Holding GmbH. Grohe Holding GmbH is wholly owned by Grohe Group S.à.r.l., which gets consolidated by its parent company Lixil Group.

In 2019, the company's management board consisted of four members, led by Thomas Fuhr as chairman of the board. Other members were Jonas Brennwald as Deputy CEO, Stefan Gesing as Chief Financial Officer, and Michael Mager as Executive Director Human Resources & Organization.

The Supervisory Board of Grohe AG is composed of an equal numbers of six employee representatives and six shareholder representatives. The chairman of the supervisory board in 2018 was Kinya Seto, chief executive officer of the LIXIL Group.

== International outreach ==
=== Grohe in the United States ===
In 1975, Grohe opened a small office just outside Chicago, and its representative, Urell, Inc. in Massachusetts, began supplying European-style kitchen and bathroom fixtures to American tradesmen and retailers. The new venture was incorporated a year later as Grohe America, Inc. and moved into a small warehouse-office complex. In order to keep pace with its rapid growth, the company regularly upsized its premises: a section of a larger warehouse facility in 1978, a whole warehouse in Wood Dale in 1986, and settled into a custom-built 90,000 square-foot facility in Bloomingdale, Illinois, in 1993.

Sales figures doubled year after year as Grohe introduced a series of products such as pull-out spray kitchen faucets Ladylux of 1983 and Europlus of 1989. In the early 1990s, Grohe introduced a white finish. Introduction of clear powder-coating in the 1980s provided superior adhesion for polished finishes, replaced in the late 1990s by stainless steel versions. In 1979, the Grohmix thermostat line was launched, and water-temperature regulation technology in 1980. Grohe America then started advertising directly to consumers.

Grohe introduced a new product line For commercial customers in 1989, and a showroom marketing program for wholesalers. In 1996, Grohe America launched its first television advertisement campaign and started offering a limited lifetime warranty in 1997. By the mid-1990s, Grohe America was selling fixtures with a value of US$38 million annually, with a market share of 1.7%. Grohe opened a 15,000 square-foot showroom for professional partners and visitors on Fifth Avenue in New York City in September 2011. In 2012, Grohe moved its US headquarters from Bloomingdale, Illinois to New York City.

=== Grohe in Pakistan ===
Grohe products are distributed in Pakistan through authorised retailers such as Sanitarium & Grohe Pakistan official showrooms in major cities such as Lahore, Karachi, and Islamabad. Grohe in Pakistan caters to the upper and middle premium segments.

=== Grohe in Bangladesh ===
Grohe products are distributed in Bangladesh through authorised retailers including Priotoma Bangla and Tilottoma Bangla Group. These companies offer collections such as Allure Brilliant, Europlus, and Cosmopolitan in showrooms located in Dhaka and Chattogram. The brand targets the premium segment of the bathroom fittings market, emphasising water-saving technology and minimalist design.

=== Grohe in Sri Lanka ===
Since 2017, Grohe products are distributed in Sri Lanka through the exclusive authorised distributor 'Gismo International', headquartered in Sri Jayawardenepura Kotte. The brand targets the premium segment of the bathroom fittings market, catering to hotels, resorts, apartments, houses, hospitals and numerous other institutions.
