= American Standard Brands =

Plumbing fixtures company

- Logo used since 2017 in Asia-Pacific and 2023 in North America
- Type: Private
- Industry: Manufacturing
- Predecessor: American Standard Companies
- Founded: 2008; 18 years ago
- Headquarters: Piscataway, New Jersey, U.S.
- Key people: Steven P. Delarge (CEO)
- Products: Plumbing fixtures
- Owners: Lixil Group
- Website: americanstandard-us.com

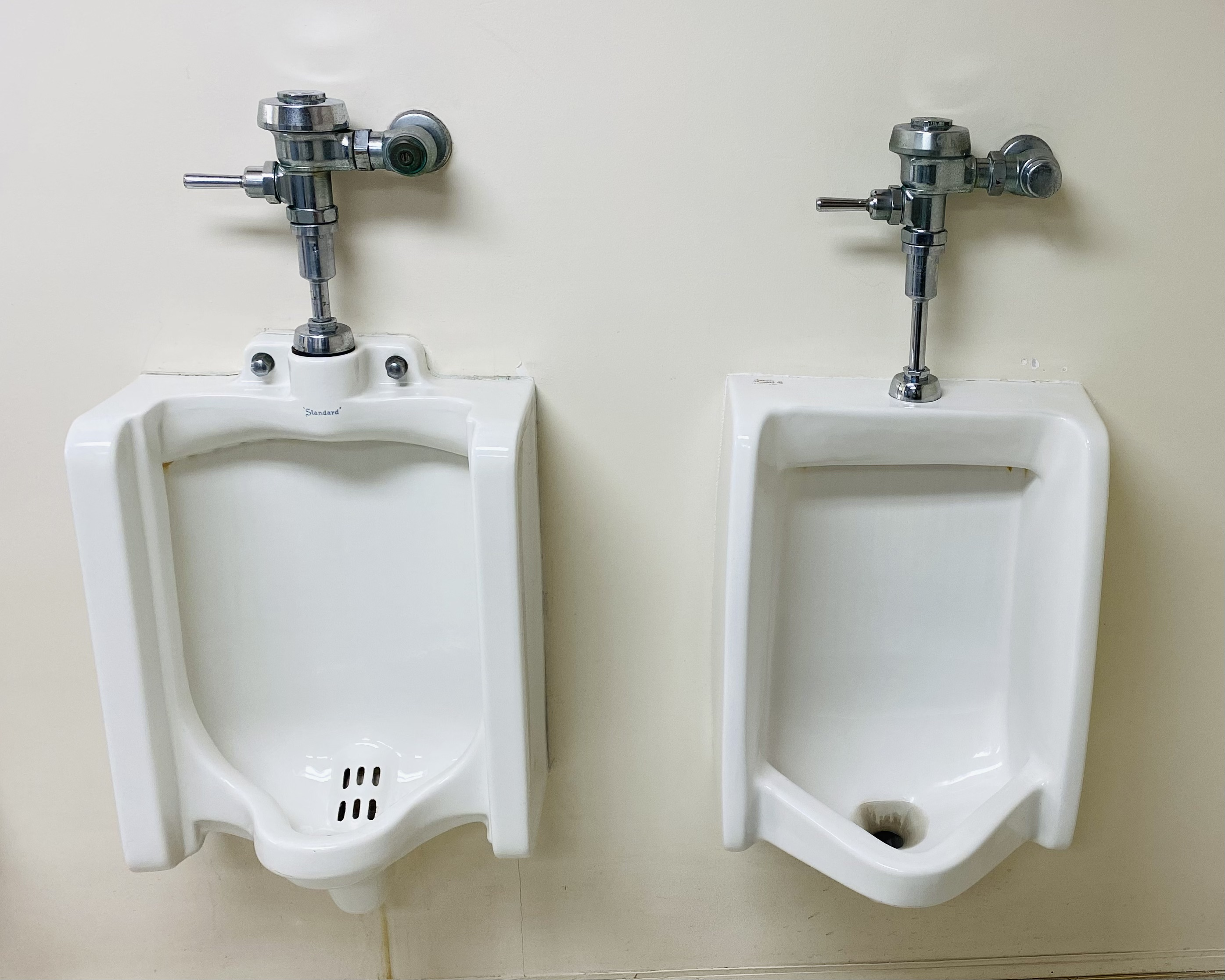
1965 Washal urinal, branded as "Standard", left, and newer Washbrook urinal, right

American Standard Brands is a North American manufacturer of plumbing fixtures, based in Piscataway, New Jersey, United States. Since 2013, it has been a subsidiary of the Lixil Group. The company was formed from American Standard Americas, the North American operations of the kitchen and bathroom division that were previously owned by American Standard Companies before its breakup in 2007. Crane Plumbing and Eljer were merged into the company in 2008, creating American Standard Brands.

In addition to its namesake American Standard brand, the company also produces products under the Crane, Eljer, Fiat, Sanymetal, and Showerite brands.

== History ==
=== Break up of American Standard Companies ===
On February 1, 2007, American Standard Companies announced it would break up its three divisions. The plan included the sale of its kitchen and bath division and the spin off of WABCO Holdings, American Standard's vehicle controls division, while retaining the Trane Company.

In July 2007, American Standard announced the sale of the kitchen and bath division to Bain Capital Partners, LLC for $1.76 billion. This included the sale of the American Standard name to Bain, though American Standard retained the rights to use the "American Standard" name for its HVAC products.

At the time of the deal, the kitchen and bath business generated $2.4 billion and had 26,000 workers across 54 production facilities in 23 countries. The deal closed on October 31, 2007. American Standard subsequently changed its name to Trane on November 28, 2007.

=== American Standard Brands ===
Previous logo, used from 2013 until 2023 in North America

Bain Capital created American Standard Americas from the North American units of the bath and kitchen business units acquired from American Standard Companies. Bain sold a majority stake in American Standard Americas to Sun Capital Partners on November 27, 2007 for $130 million. It later sold off the Asian business unit to JS Group and retained the European and Latin American operations as Ideal Standard.

In February 2008, American Standard Americas merged with two other plumbing fixture companies, Crane Plumbing and Eljer to create American Standard Brands. The Crane Plumbing unit includes the former Universal-Rundle product line which Crane acquired in 1995 and continues to support with repair parts. Crane also has a Canadian subsidiary Crane Plumbing Corporation.

The new company went on to experience financial difficulties soon after. American Standard saw a 3% decline in revenue in 2011, losing $20 million in the fourth quarter alone. In January 2012, Jay Gould was hired as CEO and president to help turn things around.

=== Sale to Lixil Group ===
In June 2013, the Japanese firm Lixil Group agreed to purchase American Standard Brands from Sun Capital Partners for $342 million. Under Gould and Lixil, the company significantly improved employee morale and increased revenue by $200 million by the beginning of 2014. American Standard also invested heavily in the company's Mexico facilities, where a vast majority of its employees are based.

Starting in January 2014, Ferguson Enterprises became an authorized American Standard wholesaler. In 2014, the company launched a DXV, a luxury bath and kitchen line celebrating the company's 15th decade.

Gould resigned in January 2015 and was replaced by CFO Steven Delarge.

In 2015, American Standard was recognized for the top spot for "Brand Familiarity" in Bathroom Accessories category by the Builder Magazine. The company's VorMax toilet line was also named a 2015 Good Design award recipient by the Chicago Athenaeum. For the 2018 Atlanta Braves season, American Standard opened branded bathrooms at SunTrust Park.

=== International outreach ===
American Standard operates as a global sanitary-ware leader present in about 150 countries with manufacturing, and research and development across Asia and international sales in over 20 countries.

At a global trade event held in Bangkok, Thailand, Lixil unveiled a new global brand identity for American Standard under the tagline "life, love, home" and hosted trade activities engaging designers and consumers across Asia Pacific.

Since 2013, American Standard is distributed in Sri Lanka through the exclusive authorised distributor 'Gismo International', and targets the premium segment of the bathroom fittings market, catering to five-star hotels and resorts, luxury residential apartments, homes, hospitals, and numerous other institutions.

== See also ==
- Ideal Standard, former European and Latin American operations of American Standard's predecessor.
- American Radiator Building
- John B. Pierce
- Primary competitors: Delta, Kohler, Moen, Pfister, Toto
