= Eschach (Neckar) =

River in Germany

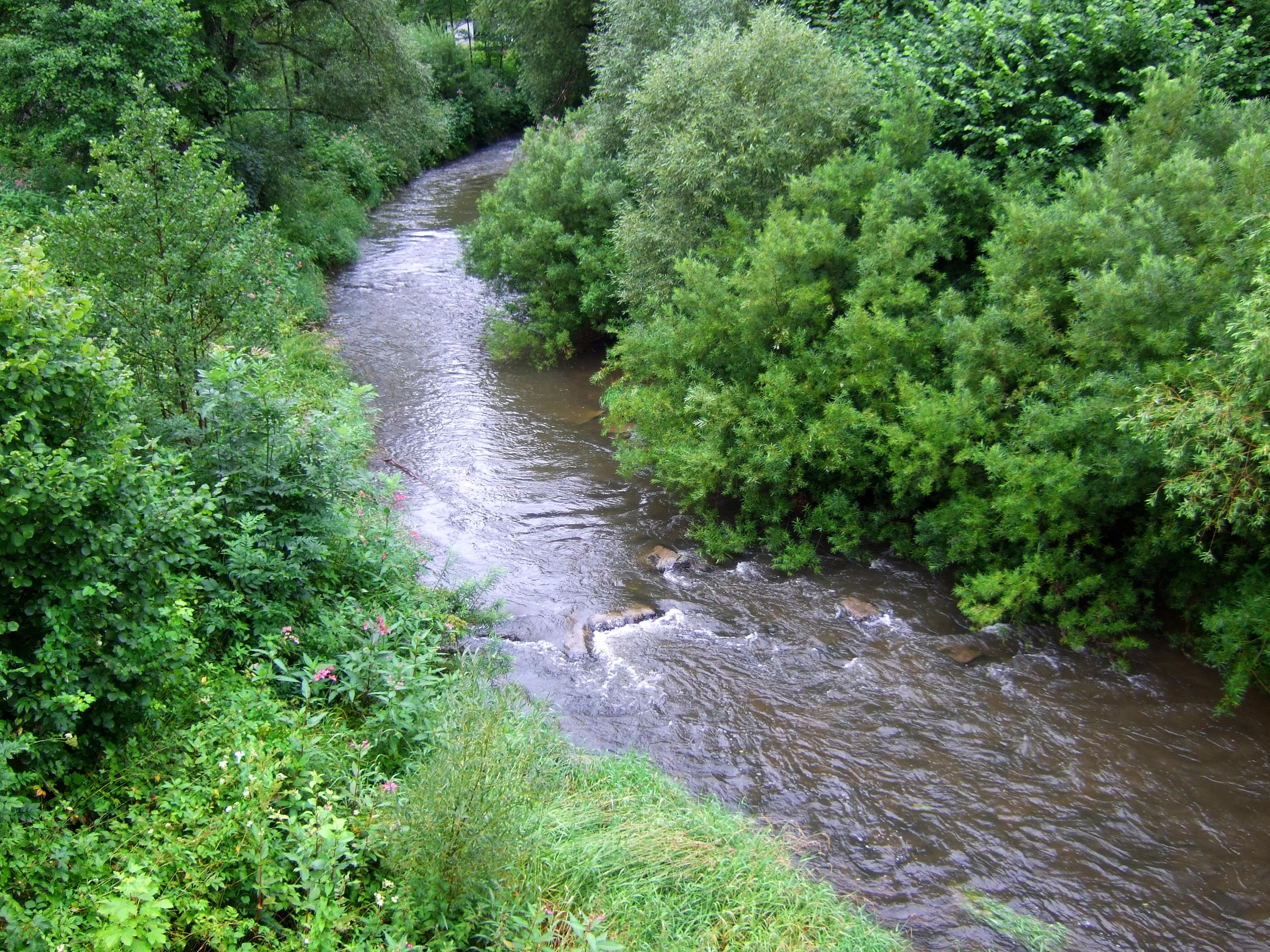

Location
- Country: Germany
- State: Baden-Württemberg

Physical characteristics
- Source
  - elevation: 699 m above Sea Level
- Mouth
  - location: Neckar
  - coordinates: 48.1399°N 8.6279°E
  - elevation: 571 m above Sea Level
- Length: 38.1 km (23.7 mi)
- Basin size: 218 km^{2} (84 sq mi)

Basin features
- Progression: Neckar→ Rhine→ North Sea

The Eschach (German pronunciation: [ˈɛʃax]; upstream from Horgen also: Württembergische Eschach) is a river of Baden-Württemberg, Germany. It flows into the Neckar south of Rottweil.

== Geography ==
=== Source flows ===
The Eschach arises from two spring waters. The longer one is hydrographically classified as its upper course, the much more water-rich one as its third important inflow.

=== Northern headwaters ===
The longest flow path begins today as Eschach (without name addition), after older name as Württembergische Eschach or also Horgener Eschach. It has its source at the homestead "Heimliswald" in the district Rötenberg of Aichhalden at an elevation of 699 m above sea level and flows first in southeast direction. After the Eschach has limited the Winzeln-Schramberg Airfield to the west - the municipal area of Fluorn-Winzeln borders there on the left bank - at km 3.258 of its course it is fed from the right side of the Bannmoosgraben. At km 4,7, the Seltenbach also comes from the right, before it runs along the northeastern edge of the Schramberg town of Heiligenbronn. The Mollenmoosgraben flows towards it at km 6,13. At km 8,1 it reaches the center of Seedorf in the community Dunningen at the turning point of a loop to the east, after which it continues south.

At km 11,47 the Eberbach, also called Aitenbach, flows from the right. Shortly afterwards it underruns the B 462 and reaches Dunningen itself, almost entirely on the left side of the river. After it has meandered around several hills, it flows on its 20th kilometre along Lackendorf. In the now formed valley it then passes the villages Stetten ob Rottweil and Flözlingen of the community Zimmern ob Rottweil. In their last valley village Horgen at km 26,57 from the right the Fischbach finally flows.

=== Eschbach and Fischbach ===
The most productive source is that of the Eschbach and the Glasbach, which merge with other waters to form the Fischbach.

The Eschbach is reached at km 1.85 by the 3.5 km long Birkenmoosgraben, in the village Eschbronn-Mariazell. At km 4,7 it connects with the Reutenbach coming from the right to the Hinterbach, this at km 5,46 with the Mittelbach to the Eschbach. At km 7,46 it meets in the village Fischbach the Glasbach coming from the right. Herewith the river section begins as Fischbach. At km 11,76 after the source of the Eschbach this Fischbach flows together with the Badische Eschach. Since this is the weaker and with 13,9 km km also opposite the main stream, which has measured 16,8 km km until here, the name Fischbach is maintained until the confluence with the Württembergische Eschach in Horgen.

In the valley slope north of the Fischbach are the ruins of a Roman estate and a Roman bath.

After the confluence of Eschach and Fischbach, according to the older interpretation of Württemberg and Badischer Eschach, the river flows through a partly narrow valley with Muschelkalk rock faces on the impact slopes, a popular hiking area.

At Rottweil-Bühlingen the Eschach merges with the Neckar. The confluence transforms the Neckar from a stream into a small river. At this point, the course of the Eschach is almost twice as long as that of the Neckar, and its catchment area, as well as its water flow, is about three times as large. Nevertheless, the Neckar, which maintains its flow direction, is considered the main river. However, the main hydrological source of the Neckar system can be considered the Glasbach, which has its source on the Brogen (Glasbach→Fischbach→Badische Eschach→Eschach).

=== Tributaries ===
Tributaries of the Württembergische Eschach

- Bannmoosgraben (right)
- Seltenbach (right)
- Weiherbach (right)
- Weilergraben (right)
- Zundelwäldlegraben (right)
- Eberbach (right), 4,7 km
- Steppe ditch (left)
- Kimmichgraben (right)
- Brook from the Miller Pond (right)
- Haselbach (right)
- Heckenweiherbach (right)
- Brook from the Bärenwiesen (left)
- Holderbrunnen (right)
- Sulzbach (left)

Tributaries of the Badische Eschach

- Crab Grave (right)
- Augenmoosbach (right)
- Moosbach (right)
- Bohlbächle (right)
- Schorenbächle (right)
- Light ditch (left)
- Ammelbach (right)
- Neuhauser Bächle (left)
- Schlierbach (left)
- Wannenbächle (right)
- Langentalbächle (right)
- Fischbach (left)
- Teufenbach (left)

Tributaries of the Eschach

- Sailersbach (right)
- Lausenhärdtles Graben (left)

== Conservation ==
Both the Badische and the Württembergische Eschach as well as the lower reaches of Teufenbach and Fischbach are part of the FFH-areas Baar, Eschach and south-east Black Forest. They are home to populations of European Protected Species. bullhead, brook lamprey, thick shelled river mussel, stone crayfish and beaver and are in parts themselves protected as "flowing waters with flooded aquatic vegetation". Also the high herb fields and strips of floodplain forest along the banks are protected as FFH-habitat type. In addition, numerous other habitat types can be found on the adjacent meadows and valley slopes.

== See also ==
- List of rivers of Baden-Württemberg
