= Tennenbronn =

Coordinates: 48°11′N 8°21′E

- Interactive map of Tennenbronn
- Country: Germany
- State: Baden-Württemberg
- District: Rottweil
- Town: Schramberg

Population (2024)
  - Total: 3,390

Tennenbronn is a district of Schramberg in the district of Rottweil, in Baden-Württemberg, Germany. As of 2024, it has 3,390 inhabitants.

Until 30 April 2006 the district was independent; its integration into Schramberg was decided in early 2006 by citizen voting. Tennenbronn as such is the first municipality since the administration reform in 1970 that surrendered its independence.

== Geography ==
=== Geographical Situation ===
Tennenbronn is placed in the Bernecktal southwest of Schramberg, sitting between 460 and 943 m above sea level. The highest point of Tennenbronn, as well as of the district of Rottweil is the Brunnhölzer Höhe (943 m above sea level). Integrated in 2006 into Schramberg, the urban district is located on the western tip of the district of Rottweil and borders to the south on the Schwarzwald-Baar-Kreis, as well as to the west on the Ortenaukreis.

=== Neighboring Municipalities ===
Tennebronn's neighboring municipalities are Lauterbach to the north, Hardt to the east, Königsfeld to the east in the Schwarzwald (District of Buchenberg), the city St. Georgen in the southwest (urban district of Langenschiltach) and the city of Hornberg to the west (urban district of Reichenbach).

== History ==
The first historic occurrence of the term "Tennenbronn mit Kirche" (Tennenbronn with church) is from a certificate of Pope Alexander III (1159–1181) for the monastic community of St. Georgen issued on 26 March 1179. In the Late Middle Ages, the ownership is also contributed to the Sirs of Falkenstein und Rechberg, by the 16th century the Falkensteiner and St. Georgener properties were then owned by the dukes of Württemberg. Tennenbronn at the time was divided into a Protestant and a Catholic part (Tennenbronner Vetrag 1558), with the Catholic part being aligned to the Herrschaft Schramberg (a small duchy in Baden-Württemberg) or Anterior Austria respectively. The late gothic church "Unsere Liebe Frau" (our dear Lady, meaning Mary, mother of Jesus) was built in 1453 and burned down to the ground in 1901. It became a Protestant church and its predecessor building has already been a parish since the 12th century. The Catholic village had its own parish since 1786, and in 1848 the church St. Johann Baptista was erected. Because of the Napoleonic changes the two places of Tennenbronn became part of Württemberg in 1805 and due to a barrier treaty between Württemberg and Baden in 1810 they became part of Baden. Napoleon did not want to cross the Kingdom of Württemberg with his army on the march/its campaign. Tennenbronn was conferred to the Grand Duchy Baden on Napoleon's order, because the military road of Offenburg on the Benzebene to Konstanz was touching on the district to Tennenbronn. On 1 October 1922 the Protestant and Catholic part of Tennenbronn were united politically to one municipality. Tennenbronn belonged to the superior office of Baden, which is called Hornberg, after that, from 1857 onwards, it was part of the superior office Triberg and since 1924 it is part of the district office or administrative district Villingen. Since the 19th century, population growth has been quite vigorous, also combined with fluctuations of 1571 people in 1834 up to almost 4000 people today. The district area amounts to 3501 ha incorporation to Schramberg.

== Incorporation into Schramberg ==
After the municipality found it increasingly difficult to finance the municipal infrastructure, from the summer of 2005 onwards, the decision was taken to give up municipal independence. On 15 January 2006, the citizens voted 61.61% in favour of incorporation into Schramberg, which was completed on 1 May 2006. There was considerable resistance to this from the municipality's conservative environment. This made Tennenbronn the first municipality in Baden-Württemberg to voluntarily relinquish its independence since 1977. Schramberg also had great interest in this as the city crossed the important threshold of 20,000 citizens.

=== First mention in papal charter ===
The contacts of the Benedictine monastery St. George's Abbey in the Black Forest, founded in 1084/1085, towards the papacy were highly positive. A number of papal privileges, beginning with the papal charter from Pope Urban II (1088–1099) from the 8.March 1095 confirm this. Even under the abbot of St. George's Abbey in the Black Forest, Manegold of Berg (1169- 1193/1194) many different papal privileges came in the Possession of the monastery. The privilege from the 26.03.1179 is without a doubt the most important one. In this Pope Alexander III attested every right and possession up until this point for the abbot and monks of St. George's Abbey. Besides the "Roman Freedom", which included the free election of abbot and bailiff, it especially regulated the countryside and the possession of churches and monasteries at different locations. The certificate also lists Tennenbronn, which was first mentioned in written sources here. Even back then Tennenbronn included a parish church, thus having a certain function a center for the surrounding area. This suggests that the village is way older than the first mentioning of 1179 would lead to believe.

== Politics ==
Tennenbron is a city district of the Große Kreisstadt Schramberg since the 01.05.2006. Besides a municipal council, which is doing politics for the Schramberg and its city districts, Tennenbronn also has a local council, consisting of 11 participants.

The chairperson of the local council is the head of the municipality. The local council election on May 25, 2014, resulted in the following outcome:

1. Freie Liste: 6 seats
2. CDU: 3 seats
3. BDU: 2 seats

== Heads of Municipality ==
Since the incorporation in 2006, up until his retirement on 1 January 2017, Klaus Köser had been the head of the municipality of Tennenbronn.

On October 19, 2016, Jürgen Heidemann was elected, for the position of head of the municipality of Tennenbronn and began in office January 1, 2017. He applied for release from civil service and left on August 31, 2017.

On 1 January 2018, Lutz Strobel began his time as head of the municipality. On 9 July 2019, the Tennenbronn local council withdrew its confidence from Lutz Strobel and voted him out of office with 2 votes in favor and 8 votes against, out of a total of 10 votes.

The local council and the municipal council made the decision to change the status of the head of the municipality in Tennenbronn from a full-time position to a voluntary position. In June 2020, Manfred Moosmann, the deputy head of the municipality (since 2019), was elected as the new head of the municipality of Tennenbronn and began in office in July 2020.

== Religion ==
See also: St. Johann Baptist (Tennenbronn)

== Culture and Leisure ==
=== Outdoor Swimming Pools ===
Tennenbronn operates a heated outdoor swimming pool in Affentäle.

=== Clubs ===
Tennenbronn has a club life with numerous sports clubs as well as several music and carnival clubs.

== Notable people ==
- Christian Günter (* 1993), soccer player
