= Zimmern ob Rottweil =

- Municipality
- Coat of arms

- Location of Zimmern ob Rottweil within Rottweil district
- Interactive map of Zimmern ob Rottweil
- Location within Germany Location within Baden-Württemberg
- Coordinates: 48°10′05″N 08°35′28″E
- Country: Germany
- State: Baden-Württemberg
- Admin. region: Freiburg
- District: Rottweil

Government
  - Mayor (2017–25): Carmen Merz

Area
  - Total: 33.76 km^{2} (13.03 sq mi)
- Elevation: 663 m (2,175 ft)

Population (2025-12-31)
  - Total: 6,239
  - Density: 184.8/km^{2} (478.6/sq mi)
- Time zone: UTC+01:00 (CET)
  - Summer (DST): UTC+02:00 (CEST)
- Postal codes: 78658
- Dialling codes: 0741
- Vehicle registration: RW
- Website: www.zimmern-or.de

Zimmern ob Rottweil (German pronunciation: [ˈtsɪmɐn ʔɔp ˈʁɔtvaɪl], lit. 'Zimmern above Rottweil') is a municipality in the district of Rottweil, in Baden-Württemberg, Germany. The municipality includes the former independent municipalities Zimmern ob Rottweil, Flözlingen, Horgen and Stetten ob Rottweil. Zimmern is located on a plateau over the upper Neckar valley, the villages Horgen, Stetten and Flözlingen are located in the Eschach valley.

== Nearby towns and municipalities ==
The following towns and municipalities border Zimmern ob Rottweil:

Rottweil, Deißlingen, Niedereschach, Königsfeld im Schwarzwald, Eschbronn, Dunningen, Villingendorf

== History ==
The first reference of Zimmern ob Rottweil dates back to 1275 AD, Flözlingen was mentioned for the first time in 779 AD, Horgen in 1306 AD, Setten ob Rottweil in 882 AD. There are archaeological proofs for Roman and Celtic settlements on the area of the contemporary municipality.

== Notable people ==
- Erwin Teufel (born 1939), German politician (CDU)
