= Bernd Richter =

German politician

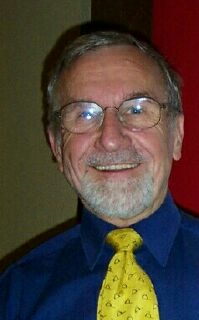
Bernd Richter

Bernhard "Bernd" Richter (born 3 April 1943 in Prague) is a German politician and retired Oberstudienrat.

From 1993 until 1995 Richter was the leader of the ödp, or Ecological Democratic Party.

Born in Prague, he currently lives in the Black Forest town Schramberg.
