= Kimmich =

Surname

Kimmich is a surname of German and Swiss-German origin. Notable people with the surname include:

- Christoph M. Kimmich (born 1939), German-American historian and eighth President of Brooklyn College
- Jon Kimmich, American businessman
- Joshua Kimmich (born 1995), German footballer
- Karl Kimmich (1880–1945), German banker
- Marc Kimmich (born 1983), Australian tennis player
- Max W. Kimmich (1893–1980), German film director and screenwriter
- Wilhelm Kimmich (1897–1986), German painter
