= Lauterbach, Baden-Württemberg =

Lauterbach
- Municipality
- The centre of Lauterbach with Catholic church St Michael

- Coat of arms

- Location of Lauterbach within Rottweil district
- Interactive map of Lauterbach
- Location within Germany Location within Baden-Württemberg
- Coordinates: 48°14′43″N 08°21′37″E
- Country: Germany
- State: Baden-Württemberg
- Admin. region: Freiburg
- District: Rottweil

Government
  - Mayor (2022–30): Jürgen Leichtle

Area
  - Total: 19.95 km^{2} (7.70 sq mi)
- Elevation: 579 m (1,900 ft)

Population (2025-12-31)
  - Total: 2,650
  - Density: 133/km^{2} (344/sq mi)
- Time zone: UTC+01:00 (CET)
  - Summer (DST): UTC+02:00 (CEST)
- Postal codes: 78730
- Dialling codes: 07422
- Vehicle registration: RW
- Website: www.lauterbach-schwarzwald.de

Lauterbach (German pronunciation: [ˈlaʊtɐbax]) is a village and municipality in the district of Rottweil in Baden-Württemberg. Lauterbach is located in the Black Forest near Schramberg, and is known as a tourist resort.

== Neighbouring towns and municipalities ==
The following towns and municipalities border on Lauterbach (clockwise, from N to W):
Wolfach, Schiltach, Schramberg and Hornberg

== Land use ==
Lauterbach's total area of 19.95 km^{2} is covered by forest (55%) and is agricultural fields (37%), the rest (8%) is built-up area and roads. Since Lauterbach is embedded into the narrow valley of the Lauterbach River there is not much space for erecting residential homes or industrial buildings. Residential expansion – although rather limited – is only possible in the outskirts.

== History and political development ==
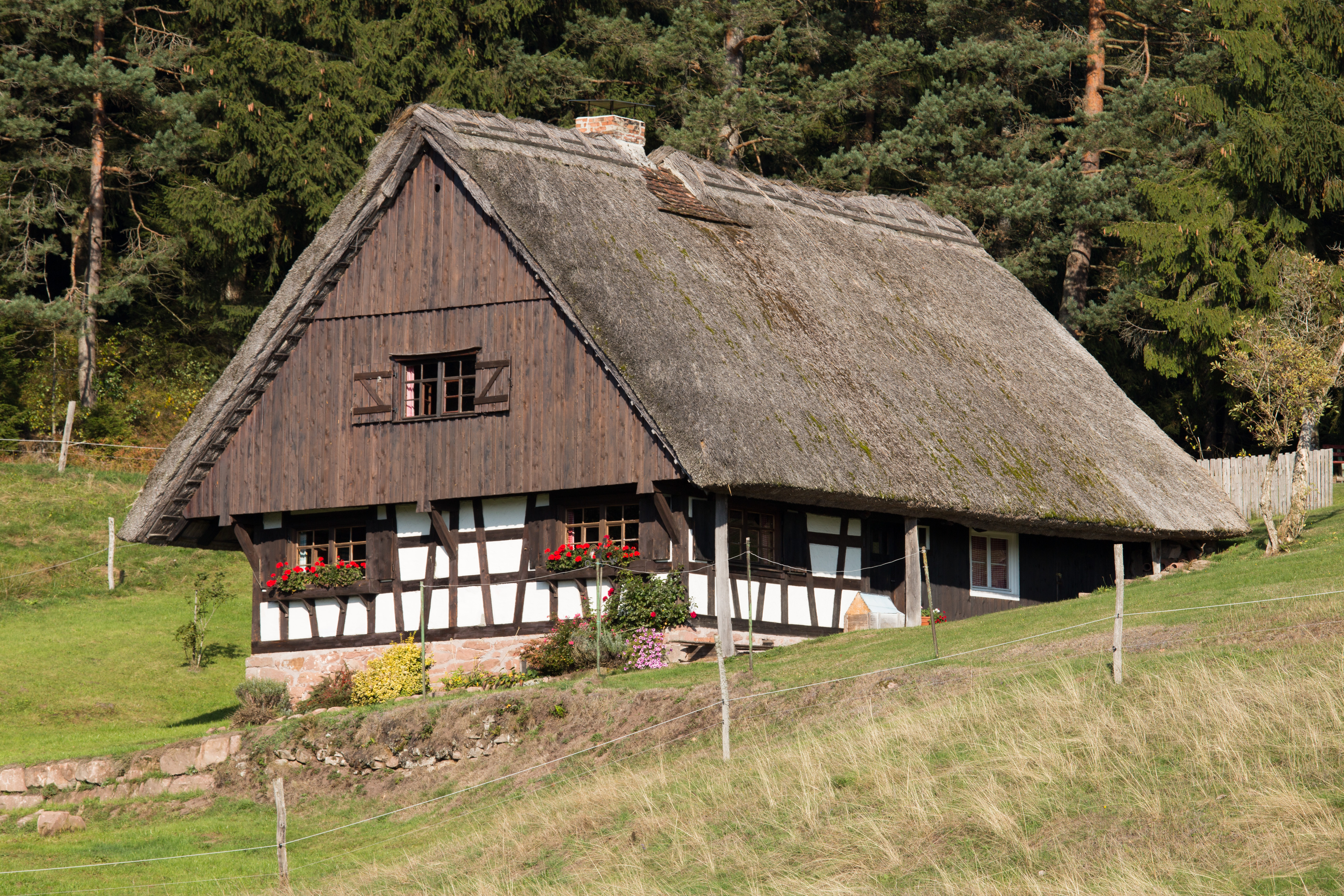
Kapfhäusle in the Sulzbach valley (German = Sulzbachtal)

The first documented mentioning of Lauterbach – although disputed – is in 1101 AD. The small village was part of the territory of Schramberg (Herrschaft Schramberg), which was sold to Habsburg in 1583. So for 222 years Lauterbach was Austrian. In 1805, as a result of Napoleon's defeat of the Austrian Emperor the area was passed on to the new Kingdom of Württemberg. Its district capital was Oberndorf am Neckar. In 1938 Schramberg and Lauterbach were incorporated into the Rottweil district, which changed from the Administrative Region of Tübingen to Freiburg in 1973.

An attempt, in 1997–98, to incorporate Lauterbach into the city of Schramberg, was turned down by the Lauterbach voters in a referendum on 1 March 1998. There is, however, co-operation with Schramberg and the neighbouring municipalities of Hardt and Aichhalden in a number of administrative fields, e.g. land utilization and zoning.

There is also regional co-operation in the field of tourism with Schramberg and the neighbouring towns in the Kinzig and Gutach valleys (Schiltach, Hornberg, Wolfach).

== Demographics ==
Population development:

Year	Inhabitants
1990	3,430
2001	3,228
2011	2,943
2021	2,834

== Economy ==
There has never been any large-scale industrial development in Lauterbach. Most of the inhabitants found jobs in the nearby clock and watch industry in Schramberg. Some small and medium-sized enterprises and the classical trades are typical of the small Black Forest village. A comb factory was founded in the late 19th century. The largest enterprise today is a plastic factory, which serves as a supplier to other German and European manufacturers.

At the end of the 19th century tourism was initiated and had a boom after World War II.

== Education and culture ==
Lauterbach has two kindergartens (one in Sulzbach and one in Lauterbach) and one elementary school, which comprises primary school, secondary school and – as of late – what is called Werkrealschule, which offers pupils additional lessons and allows them to qualify after ten years with a final exam which is equal to graduation from Realschule.

Any further secondary or vocational education is provided by the respective schools (Realschule, Gymnasium and various vocational schools in Schramberg.

Social and cultural life in Lauterbach is characterized by a large number of voluntary associations.

Initiated by and named after the painter Wilhelm Kimmich (see notable persons), there is a gallery which offers exhibitions and concerts attracting visitors from far and near.

== Notable persons born in Lauterbach ==
Jakob Heine (1800–1879)

The orthopedist Johann Georg Heine (1771–1838) and the discoverer of poliomyelitis

The Black Forest painter Wilhelm Kimmich (1897–1986)

== Honorary citizens ==
List of persons awarded honorary citizenship (in German) here.
