= Bösingen, Baden-Württemberg =

Bösingen
- Municipality
- Coat of arms

- Location of Bösingen within Rottweil district
- Interactive map of Bösingen
- Location within Germany Location within Baden-Württemberg
- Coordinates: 48°14′21″N 08°33′29″E
- Country: Germany
- State: Baden-Württemberg
- Admin. region: Freiburg
- District: Rottweil
- Subdivisions: 2 Ortsteile

Government
  - Mayor (2022–30): Peter Schuster

Area
  - Total: 22.45 km^{2} (8.67 sq mi)
- Elevation: 649 m (2,129 ft)

Population (2025-12-31)
  - Total: 3,388
  - Density: 150.9/km^{2} (390.9/sq mi)
- Time zone: UTC+01:00 (CET)
  - Summer (DST): UTC+02:00 (CEST)
- Postal codes: 78662
- Dialling codes: 07404
- Vehicle registration: RW
- Website: www.boesingen.de

Bösingen (German pronunciation: [ˈbøːzɪŋən]) is a municipality in the district of Rottweil, in Baden-Württemberg, Germany.

== Gallery ==
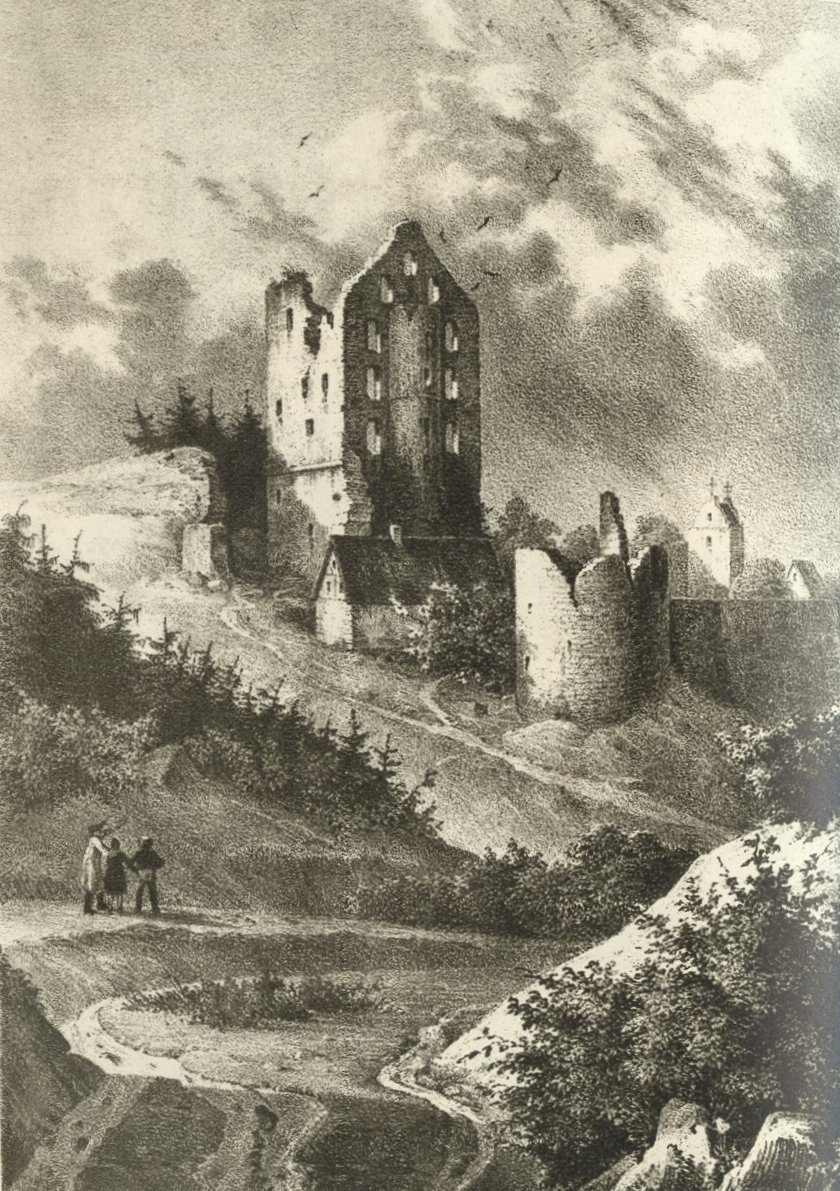
Lithography of the castle ruin of the noble family of Zimmern

== Geography ==
=== Geographical location ===
Bösingen is located in Upper Neckar valley between the Black Forest and the Swabian Jura.

=== Neighboring communities ===
The municipality is bordered to the south by Villingendorf and the Rottweil exclave Hochwald, on the west by Dunningen, north by Schramberg and Oberndorf am Neckar and on the east by Epfendorf.

=== Municipality arrangement ===
The municipality Bösingen belonged formerly to independent municipality Herrenzimmern. For former municipality Herrenzimmern includes the village Herrenzimmern and the homestead Stittholzhof. In the hamlet Herrenzimmern the Burgstall Lußburg/Nußburg and lying proofs of the abandoned village Hinterhofen can be found.

== History ==
Municipality Bösingen was newly formed on 1 October 1974 by the association of Bösingen and Herrenzimmern.

== Museums ==
Farmer museum in Bösingen

== Buildings ==
The ruins Herrenzimmern in the district Herrenzimmern is above the upper Neckar valley.

== Regular events ==
Swabian-Alemannic Fastnacht Large village festival (annually, alternately in Bösingen and Herrenzimmern)

== Economy and Infrastructure ==
The 81 connects Bösingen to the north with the state capital Stuttgart and to the south with the Lake Constance region and Switzerland. The exit Oberndorf am Neckar is located halfway between Stuttgart and Lake Constance. Both destinations can be reached within one hour. The railway line Stuttgart - Zürich - Milan leads through nearby Rottweil. There are hourly connections from there to Stuttgart or Singen.

== Personality ==
- Joshua Kimmich (born 1995), Football player for FC Bayern Munich and Germany national football team

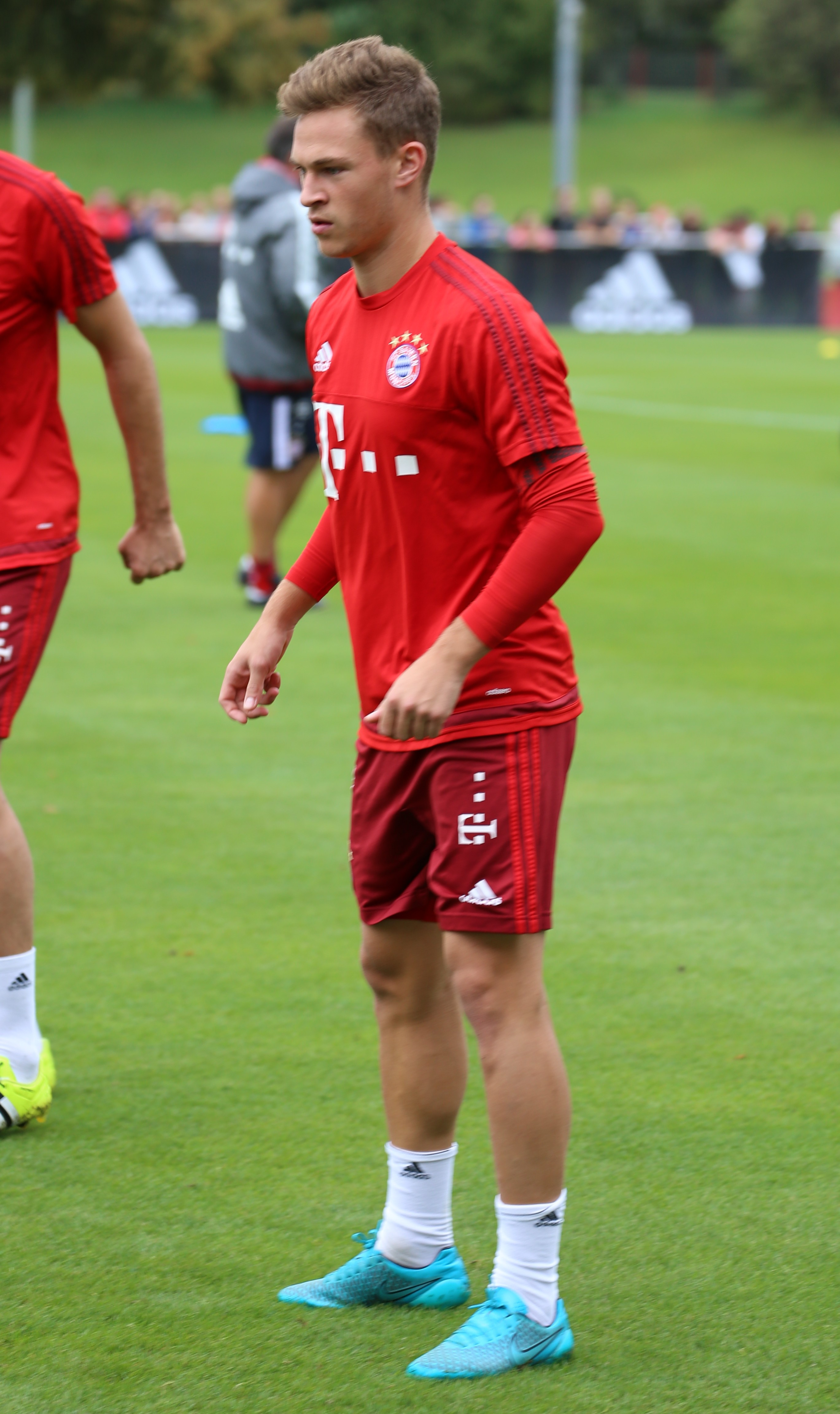
Joshua Kimmich training area FC Bayern München
