= Vöhringen =

Vöhringen can refer to several places:

- Vöhringen, Bavaria, a town in Germany
- Vöhringen, Baden-Württemberg, a municipality in Germany
