= Deißlingen =

German municipality

- Municipality
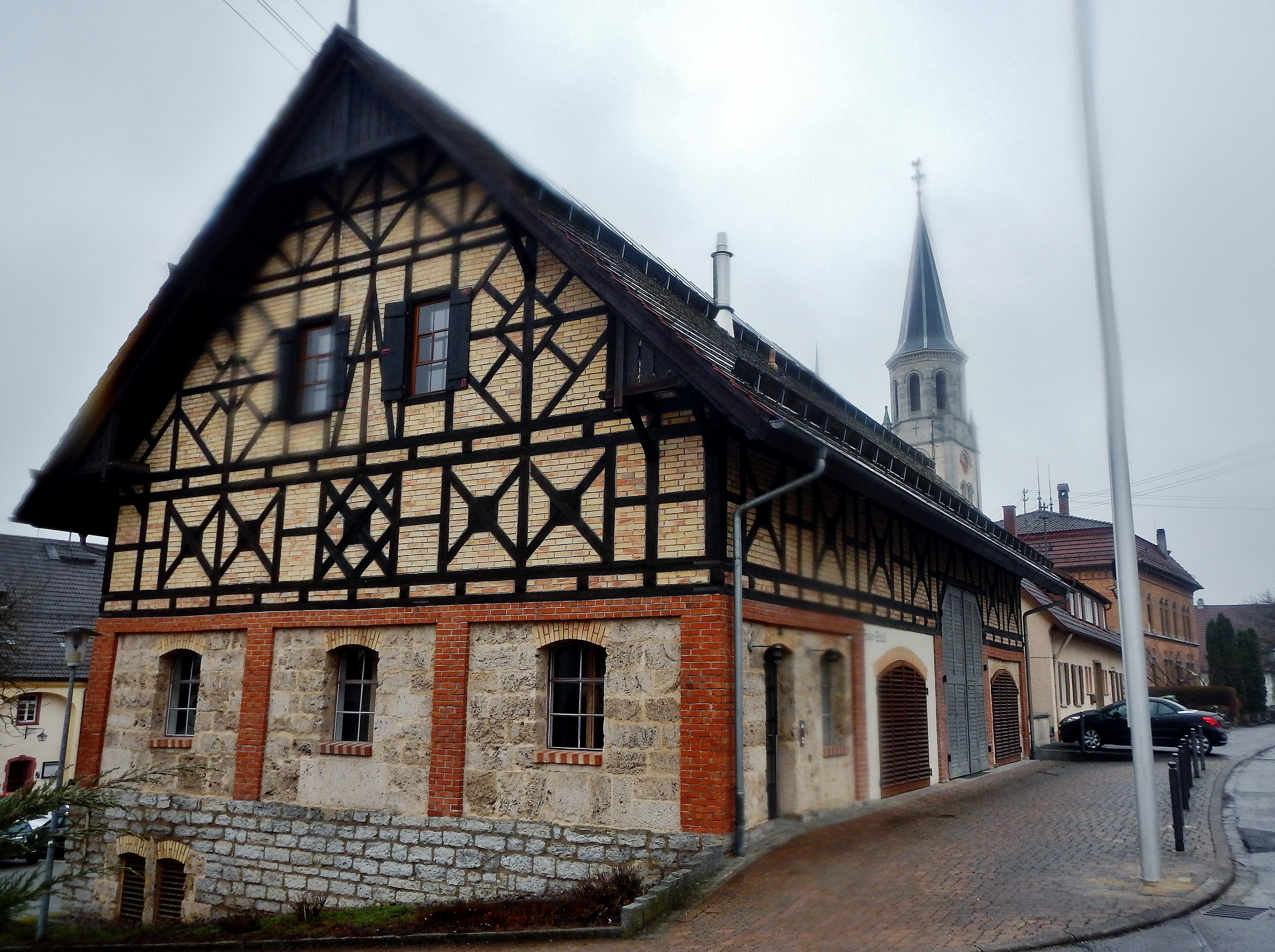
- The Deißlinger Hagenstall

- Coat of arms

- Location of Deißlingen within Rottweil district
- Interactive map of Deißlingen
- Location within Germany Location within Baden-Württemberg
- Coordinates: 48°06′48″N 08°36′22″E
- Country: Germany
- State: Baden-Württemberg
- Admin. region: Freiburg
- District: Rottweil

Area
  - Total: 32.15 km^{2} (12.41 sq mi)
- Elevation: 611 m (2,005 ft)

Population (2025-12-31)
  - Total: 6,191
  - Density: 192.6/km^{2} (498.7/sq mi)
- Time zone: UTC+01:00 (CET)
  - Summer (DST): UTC+02:00 (CEST)
- Postal codes: 78652
- Dialling codes: 07420
- Vehicle registration: RW
- Website: www.deisslingen.de

Deißlingen (German pronunciation: [ˈdaɪslɪŋən]; Swabian: Deißlinge) is a municipality of the district of Rottweil of Baden-Württemberg, Germany.

== History ==
In 1802–03, Deißlingen, a possession of the Free Imperial City of Rottweil, and Lauffen ob Rottweil, a property of Rottenmünster Abbey, were mediatized to the Electorate, later Kingdom, of Württemberg. Deißlingen was assigned to a newly organized Oberamt at Rottweil, and Lauffen to Oberamt Spaichingen. Lauffen joined Deißlingen in Rottweil's jurisdiction on 27 October 1810. The district was reorganized on 1 October 1938 as Landkreis Rottweil, to which the two towns were still assigned. On 1 January 1974, Lauffen was incorporated into Deißlingen and a new municipality formed.

== Geography ==
The municipality (Gemeinde) of Deißlingen covers 32.15 square kilometers (12.41 sq mi) of the Rottweil district of Baden-Württemberg, which assigns Deißlingen to the metropolitan area of Villingen-Schwenningen, Tuttlingen, and Rottweil. Deißlingen is physically located in a transitional landscape between the muschelkalk-keuper plateaus of the Upper Gäu to the north, the Swabian Jura to the east, and the Baar to the south. Elevation above sea level in the municipal area ranges from a high of 753 meters (2,470 ft) Normalnull (NN) at the border with Tuttlingen district to a low of 574 meters (1,883 ft) NN on the Neckar as it forms the border with Rottweil.

The forested slopes of the Neckar and Mückenbach river valleys were declared Federally-protected landscapes in 1953. They were joined in 1990 by the Eschach valley.

== Politics ==
Deißlingen has two boroughs (Ortsteile): Deißlingen and Lauffen.

=== Coat of arms ===
The municipal coat of arms for Deißlingen shows a blue wolfsangel upon a field of yellow, with a black bar at the top containing a yellow stag antler, a clear reference to Württemberg. The wall anchor is a motif associated with Lauffen ob Rottweil's as early as 1780. This coat of arms is a combination of those of the towns of Deißlingen and Lauffen, with a change made to the chief to comply with the rule of tincture. The Rottweil district office approved the official use of the coat of arms and issued a corresponding municipal flag on 10 December 1981.
