= Bösingen =

Bösingen may refer to:

- Bösingen, Baden-Württemberg, Germany
- Bösingen, a former municipality, now part of Pfalzgrafenweiler, Baden-Württemberg, Germany
- Bösingen, Switzerland, a town

== See also ==
- Büsingen am Hochrhein, a German municipality in the south of Baden-Württemberg, an exclave within Switzerland
