= Alicia Nitecki =

American writer and academic (1942–2021)

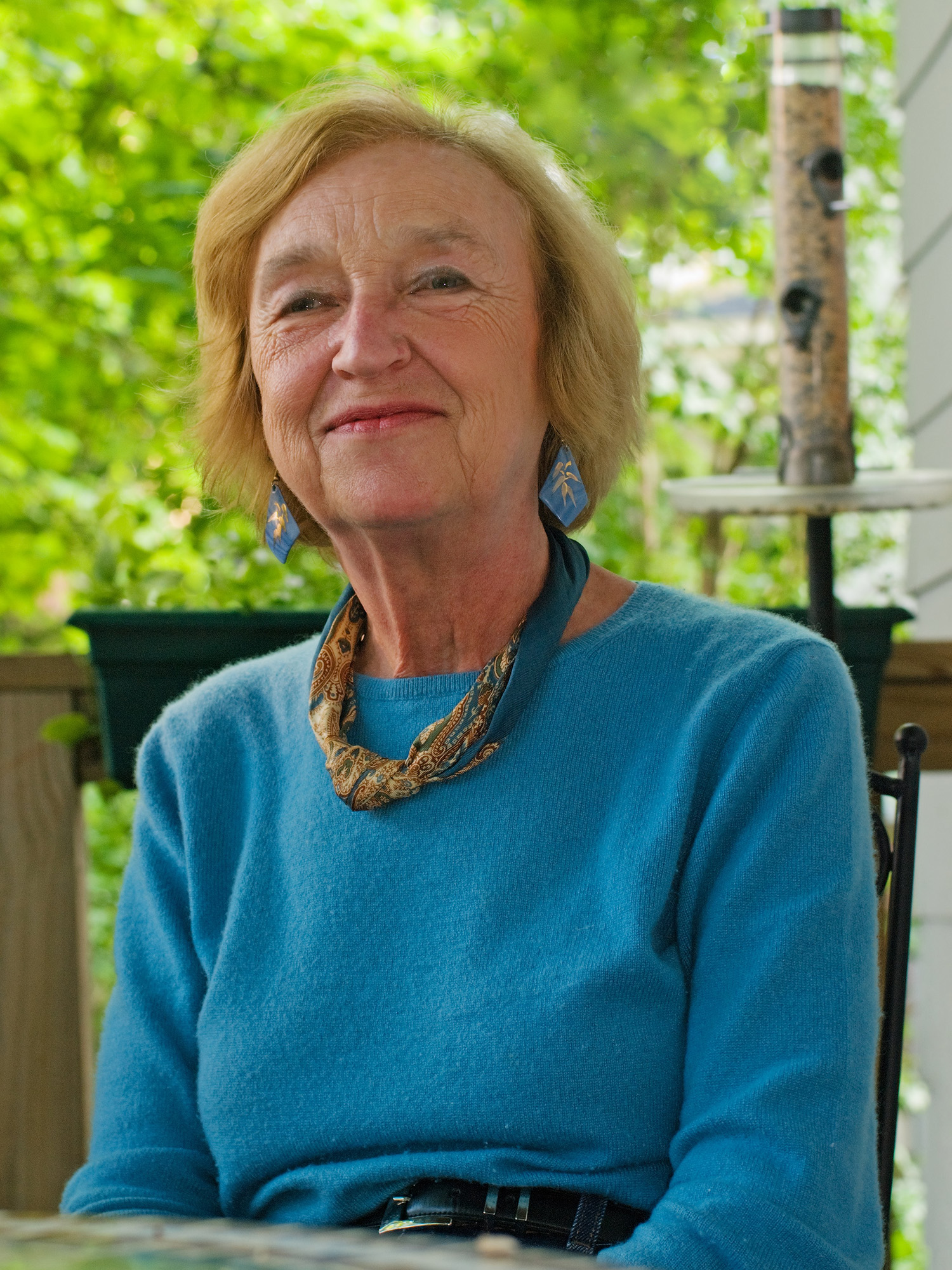
- Nitecki in 2009
- Born: January 2, 1942; Warsaw, Poland
- Died: September 5, 2021 (aged 79)
- Known for: Publications on Polish authors and holocaust literature, also essays on medieval literature and translations from Polish,
- Awards: Koret Jewish Book Award for Translation (2003)

Academic background
- Education: Sheffield University; University at Buffalo; Kent State University
- Doctoral advisor: J. L. Baird

Academic work
- Discipline: English literature
- Institutions: Bentley University

Alicia Nitecki /ni'tetski/, (January 2, 1942 – September 5, 2021) was an American author and professor of English literature at Bentley University, Waltham, Massachusetts.

== Early life in Europe ==
From 1942 to 1944 Alicia Nitecki lived in Nazi-occupied Warsaw with her upper-class family (House of Kurnatowski). After the crush of the Warsaw Uprising in August 1944 she and her family were deported by the Nazis to the west of Germany and finally lived in a labor camp in Lauterbach, Baden-Württemberg until 1945. After the war they were taken to a Polish displaced persons' camp in the Canton of La Courtine, France near Nantes and finally to Carqueiranne in southern France, where Alicia Nitecki went to a French elementary school until 1947.

In April 1948 the family came to England and frequently changed residences, which meant for Alicia frequent changes of educational institutions. She took her eleven plus exam at Scalford Church of England school, and, after another move to Derby, in the English midlands, she attended grammar school, and later a Catholic School, from which in 1960, she went to study English literature at Sheffield University, where William Empson was head of the English Department.

After graduation from Sheffield, Alicia Nitecki took a secretarial course at the City of London College, and worked as secretary and, additionally, as baby-sitter, in which capacity she was employed by the family of the American literary scholar Richard Ellmann. Ellmann suggested that she should do graduate work in English in America and wrote her a recommendation. She was accepted at the State University of New York in Buffalo in 1966.

== Academic career in the US ==
She got her M.A. in English literature from Buffalo, and then went on to a Ph.D. program at Kent State University in Ohio, where she wrote her doctoral thesis in 1976. Since 1980 she has been professor of English literature at Bentley.

Nitecki' scholarly interest was in medieval English literature, but soon she became interested in The Holocaust after her first trip to Germany, where she went to the Flossenbürg concentration camp where her grandfather had been incarcerated.

Her interest in holocaust literature focussed on Tadeusz Borowski and other Polish writers who had survived the holocaust. In 2000 she translated Borowski's We were in Auschwitz and in 2002 Henryk Grynberg's Drohobycz, Drohobycz. Other translations include:

- Halina Nelken: And Yet, I Am Here, trans. Nelken, Nitecki, University of Massachusetts Press, 1999 (Paperback 2001)
- Tadeusz Drewnowski: Postal Indiscretions: The Correspondence of Tadeusz Borowski, trans. A. Nitecki Northwestern U. Press, 2007
- Mieczyslaw Lurczynski: The Old Guard, trans. A. Nitecki SUNY Press, forthcoming 2009.

Nitecki has also published numerous essays in American and German periodicals and given lectures and presentations on both her scholarly interests, mediaeval English literature and the Holocaust, as reflected in Polish writings.

She is married to Zbigniew Nitecki and has one daughter.

== Major works ==
- Figures of Old Age in Fourteenth Century English Literature, in Aging and the Aged in Medieval Europe, edited by Michael M. Sheehan. Pontifical Institute Press, 1990.
- Recovered Land, The University of Massachusetts Press 1995 ISBN 0-87023-976-7
- Jakub's world : a boy's story of loss and survival in the holocaust (with Jack Terry), Albany : State University of New York Press, 2005. ISBN 0-7914-6407-5
