= Fischbach (Eschach) =

River in Germany

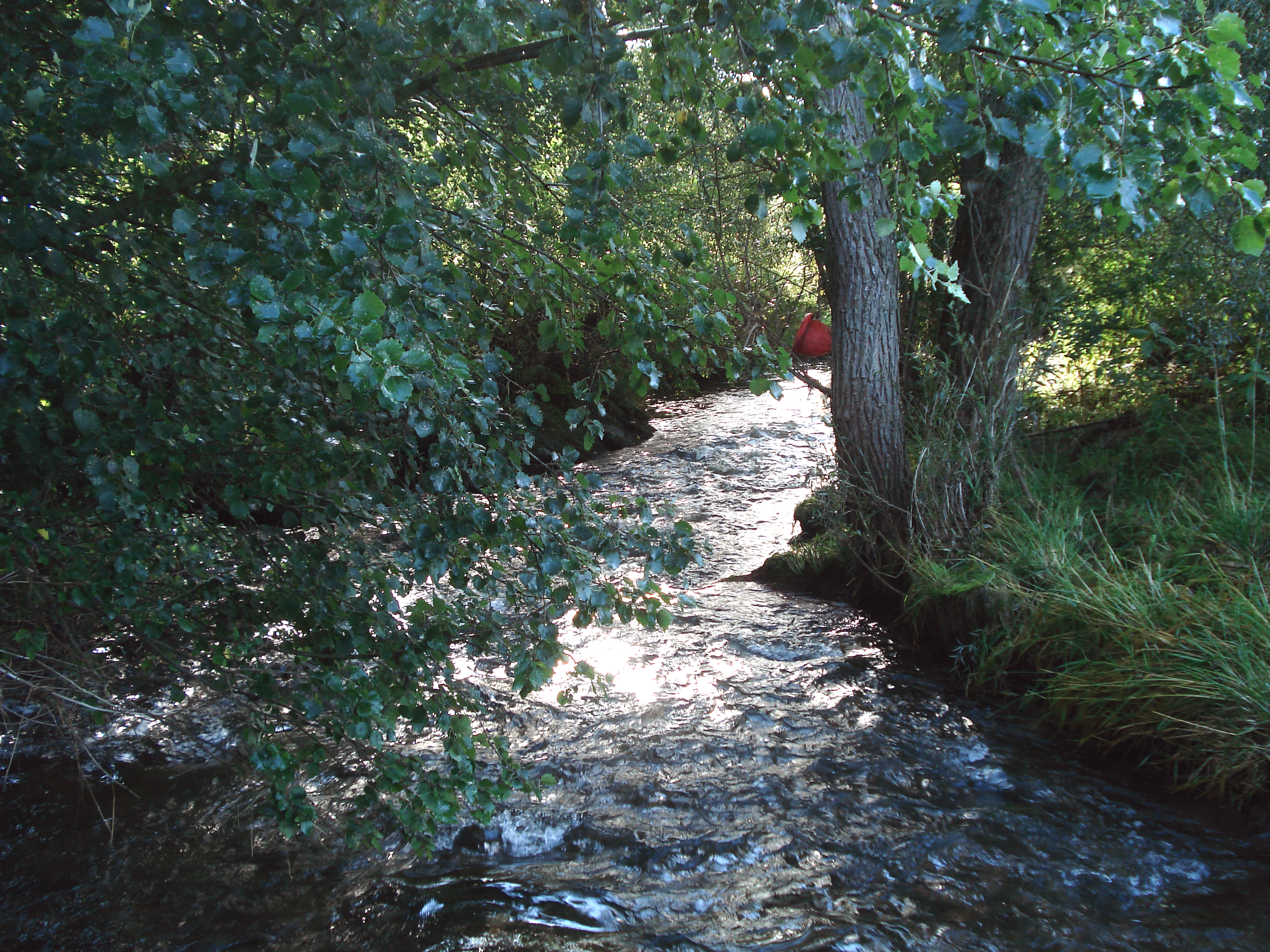

Location
- Country: Germany
- State: Baden-Württemberg
- District: Schwarzwald-Baar-Kreis
- Reference no.: DE: 2381126

Physical characteristics
- Source
  - location: Source: Confluence of the Glasbach and Eschbach in Fischbach, municipality of Niedereschach
  - coordinates: 48°09′10″N 8°29′34″E
- Mouth
  - location: in Horgen into the Eschach
  - coordinates: 48°08′46″N 8°32′58″E
- Length: 18.9 km (11.7 mi)

Basin features
- Progression: Eschach→ Neckar→ Rhine→ North Sea

The Fischbach (German pronunciation: [ˈfɪʃˌbax]) is a western and left tributary of the Baden Eschach (Badische Eschach). It flows along the eastern edge of the Black Forest in the German state of Baden-Württemberg (district of Schwarzwald-Baar). The river is 18.9 kilometres (11.7 mi) long, together with its headstream, the Glasbach.

== Course ==
The Fischbach begins at the confluence of the right-hand Glasbach, also called the Vorderbach, and the left-hand Eschbach which, in turn, is formed by the left-hand Hinterbach and right-hand Reutenbach and then collects the Mittelbach, in the village of Fischbach which belongs to the municipality of Niedereschach. The longer and bigger Glasbach is seen as the main headstream. Hydrographically this may even be considered the main source of the River Neckar, because the Fischbach has a higher streamflow than the Badische Eschach which, in turn, is the larger of the two headstreams, and the Badische Eschach is more powerful than and longer than the young Neckar at their confluence. The Fischbach flows in a southeasterly direction and merges with the Baden Eschach near Niedereschach. According to traditional sources the stream from here to Horgen is called the (Badische) Eschach, but current sources see the more powerful and longer Fischbach as continuing to Horgen where, as the bigger but shorter tributary, it empties into the longer Württemberg Eschach (Württembergische Eschach), which nowadays is just called the Eschach without any qualifier.

== See also ==
- List of rivers of Baden-Württemberg
