= Fluorn-Winzeln =

- Municipality
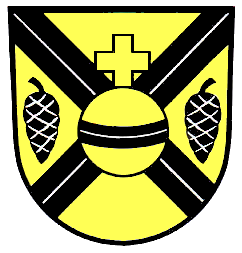
- Coat of arms

- Location of Fluorn-Winzeln within Rottweil district
- Interactive map of Fluorn-Winzeln
- Location within Germany Location within Baden-Württemberg
- Coordinates: 48°17′53″N 08°29′27″E
- Country: Germany
- State: Baden-Württemberg
- Admin. region: Freiburg
- District: Rottweil

Government
  - Mayor (2022–30): Rainer Betschner

Area
  - Total: 24.59 km^{2} (9.49 sq mi)
- Elevation: 649 m (2,129 ft)

Population (2025-12-31)
  - Total: 3,025
  - Density: 123.0/km^{2} (318.6/sq mi)
- Time zone: UTC+01:00 (CET)
  - Summer (DST): UTC+02:00 (CEST)
- Postal codes: 78737
- Dialling codes: 07402
- Vehicle registration: RW
- Website: www.fluorn-winzeln.de

Fluorn-Winzeln is a municipality in the district of Rottweil, in Baden-Württemberg, Germany.

== Geography ==
=== Geographical location ===
Fluorn-Winzeln is located on the eastern edge of the Black Forest on the Neckar Valley, about six kilometers west of Oberndorf am Neckar at an altitude of 649 m above sea level.

=== Neighboring communities ===
The municipality is bordering to the north to the Alpirsbach district Peterzell in the district of Freudenstadt, in the east to the Oberdorfer district Beffendorf, on the south to the Schramberg district Waldmössingen and in the west to Aichhalden.

Fluorn-Winzeln in Rottweil district

=== Municipality arrangement ===
The municipality Fluorn-Winzeln consists of the previously independent municipalities Fluorn and Winzeln.

== History ==
Archaeological findings suggest that in Roman times a brickyard was in Winzeln forest. In 1099 Fluorn is first mentioned in a document of the Alpirsbach Abbey. On November 1, 1972, the two villages Fluorn and Winzeln closed together and merged to Fluorn-Winzeln.

== Politics ==
The community belongs to the Agreed Management Board of the City Oberndorf am Neckar.

On 30 January 2022 Rainer Betschner was elected mayor. He succeeded Bernhard Tjaden, who had been in office since 2005.

=== Partnerships ===
Fluorn-Winzeln maintains partnerships with Schönau an der Triesting in Lower Austria and to the hamlet Obercarsdorf of the town Dippoldiswalde in Saxony.

== Sports ==
There are two football clubs, the VFL Fluorn and the SV Winzeln.

== Education ==
In the district Fluorn there is a primary school with Werkrealschule, the primary school in the district Winzeln was closed in the summer of 2015. All secondary schools are available in the nearby cities of Oberndorf am Neckar, Aichhalden, Schramberg, Dunningen and Rottweil.

== Sons and daughters of the city ==
- Reiner Trik (born 1963), ringer.
