= Rosalinde Haas =

Rosalinde Haas (born January 7, 1932, in Schramberg, Baden-Württemberg) is a German organist.

== Biography ==
Haas's father was the organist at a local church; she learned at age seven to play the pedal parts during services. At 16 she attended Stuttgart's Academy of Music, graduating to work with Maestro Fernando Germani at the Accademia Nazionale di Santa Cecilia in Rome. She studied with Helmut Walcha in Frankfurt am Main, and later at the Accademia Musicale Chigiana in Siena, Italy, at a time when Siena was crowded with aspiring musicians: Arturo Benedetti Michelangeli, George Enescu, Gaspar Cassado, Nathan Milstein, and Paul van Kempen among them. She studied music religiously, in a culture of religious music.

Haas's concert repertoire includes works by Johann Sebastian Bach, César Franck, Charles-Marie Widor, Max Reger, Marcel Dupré, Maurice Duruflé, Olivier Messiaen, and contemporary compositions by Paul Hindemith and Max Baumann. With the support of her husband, professor of musicology Peter Krams, she recorded all of Max Reger's organ works for the MD&G label between 1988 and 1990 including arrangements of Bach's Well-Tempered Clavier for organ. Haas has also taught, including as Professor of Organ at the Robert Schumann Academy in Düsseldorf, where she taught pupils to use their feet "as if they were Speedy Gonzales".

Much of her professional career was spent in Frankfurt am Main, where she was the organist at St. Leonhard's Church (1956-1980) and then in Niederrad (1980-1992).

Since retiring these posts Haas plays the organ and harpsichord at home, concentrating on Bach's Kunst der Fuge, Goldberg Variations, and Leipziger Chorale.
