= Otto Ernst Schweizer =

German architect

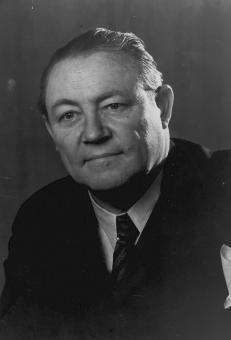
- Born: 27 April 1890; Schramberg, German Empire
- Died: 14 November 1965 (aged 75); Baden-Baden, West Germany
- Occupation: Architect

Otto Ernst Schweizer (27 April 1890 – 14 November 1965) was a German architect. His work was part of the architecture event in the art competition at the 1932 Summer Olympics.
