= Schramberg =

- Town
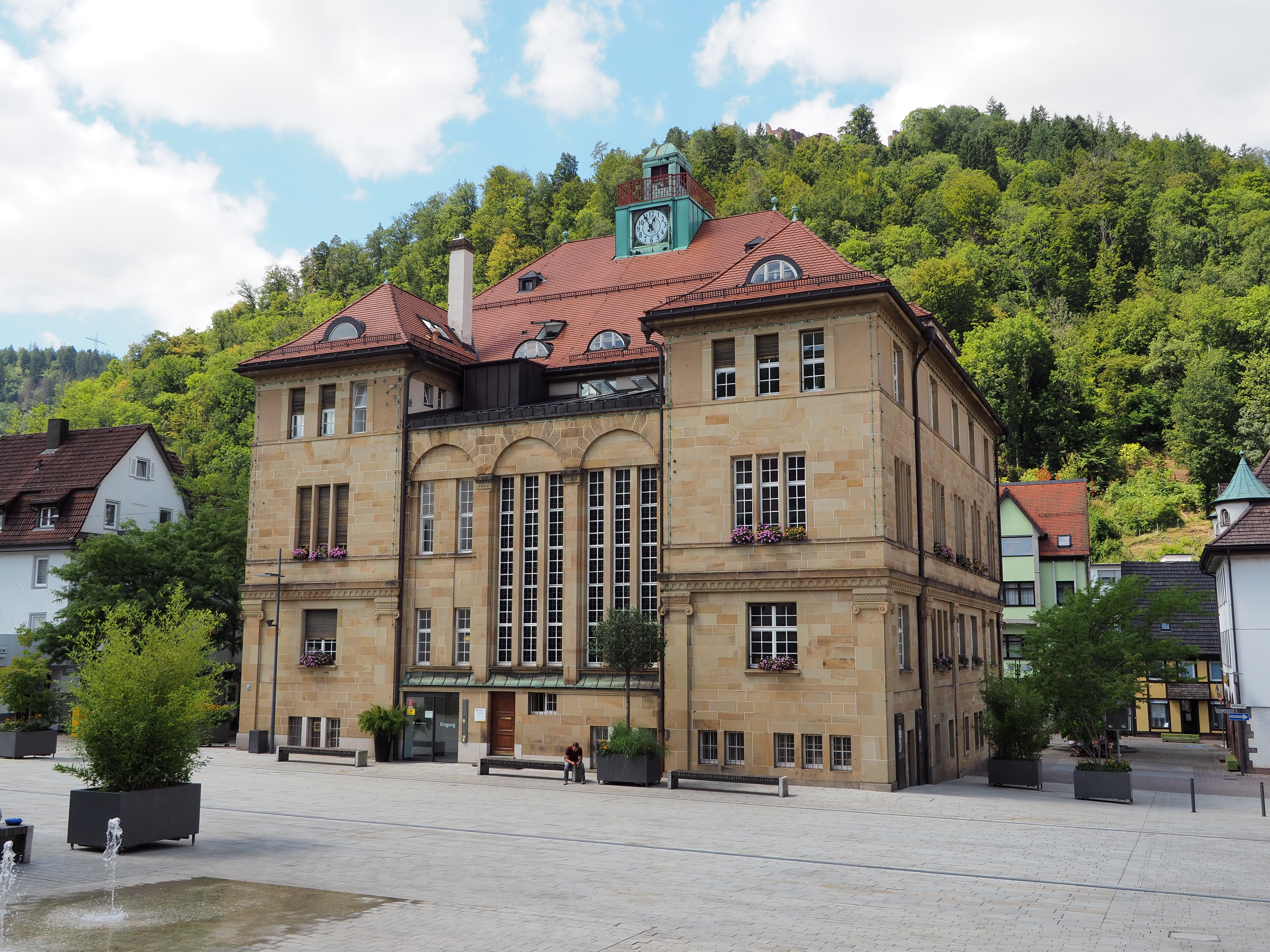
- Town hall

- Coat of arms

- Location of Schramberg within Rottweil district
- Interactive map of Schramberg
- Location within Germany Location within Baden-Württemberg
- Coordinates: 48°13′37″N 08°23′03″E
- Country: Germany
- State: Baden-Württemberg
- Admin. region: Freiburg
- District: Rottweil
- Subdivisions: Town centre plus three districts

Government
  - Mayor (2019–27): Dorothee Eisenlohr (Ind.)

Area
  - Total: 80.7 km^{2} (31.2 sq mi)
- Elevation: 424 m (1,391 ft)

Population (2025-12-31)
  - Total: 20,415
  - Density: 253/km^{2} (655/sq mi)
- Time zone: UTC+01:00 (CET)
  - Summer (DST): UTC+02:00 (CEST)
- Postal codes: 78142-44, 78701–13
- Dialling codes: 07422
- Vehicle registration: RW
- Website: schramberg.de

Schramberg (German pronunciation: [ˈʃʁambɛʁk]) is a town in the district of Rottweil, in Baden-Württemberg, Germany. It is situated in the eastern Black Forest, 25 km northwest of Rottweil. With all of its districts (Talstadt, Sulgen, Waldmössingen, Heiligenbronn, Schönbronn and Tennenbronn (since 2006)), it has about 22,000 inhabitants.

One of the streams flowing through the Schramberg valley is the Schiltach. The "Bach na Fahrt", a traditional raft race held on Carnival Monday, is known far and wide and attracts up to 30,000 spectators each year.

== Nearby towns and municipalities ==
The following towns and municipalities border Schramberg:

Lauterbach, Schiltach, Aichhalden, Fluorn-Winzeln, Oberndorf am Neckar, Bösingen, Dunningen, Eschbronn, Hardt, Königsfeld im Schwarzwald, Sankt Georgen im Schwarzwald, Triberg im Schwarzwald (Schwarzwald-Baar-Kreis) and Hornberg (Ortenaukreis).

== History ==
The origins of Schramberg date back to the year 1293, when the locality was first described as "Schrammenberg" ("wounded hill" or "scarred hill”). From 1643 Schramberg was the centre of the Herrschaft Schramberg, belonging to Further Austria until 1805. From 1805 Schramberg was part of the Kingdom of Württemberg.

== Economy ==
As with many other black forest communities, industrialisation began in Schramberg in the 19th century. The first manufacturers produced stoneware, straw goods and enamel.

In 1861 the Junghans clock factory was founded in Schramberg. At the beginning of the 20th century Junghans became the biggest clock factory worldwide with 3000 employees. Many suppliers, such as spring producers, established their companies in the surroundings of Junghans. Although Junghans is now much smaller, it continues to produce innovative clocks and watches today.

In recent years, companies such as "Kern-Liebers", "Trumpf" and the PCB producer "Schweizer" employ many of Schramberg's inhabitants and commuters from nearby communities.

== Transport ==
Schramberg was the terminus of the Schiltach-Schramberg railway, which was formerly an important railway line for freight traffic. The line existed in 1892–1990.

== Education ==
Schramberg has a Gymnasium, a Realschule, a special school, two elementary schools and three combinations of elementary school and Hauptschule. Additionally there are a vocational school with Berufskolleg, a nursing school, a school for intellectually disabled people and a school for the blind and disabled.

== Twin towns – sister cities ==
Schramberg is twinned with:

- Hirson, France (1958)
- Charleroi, Belgium (1964)
- Lachen, Switzerland (1965)
- Čakovec, Croatia (1989)
- Glashütte, Germany (1989)

== Notable people ==
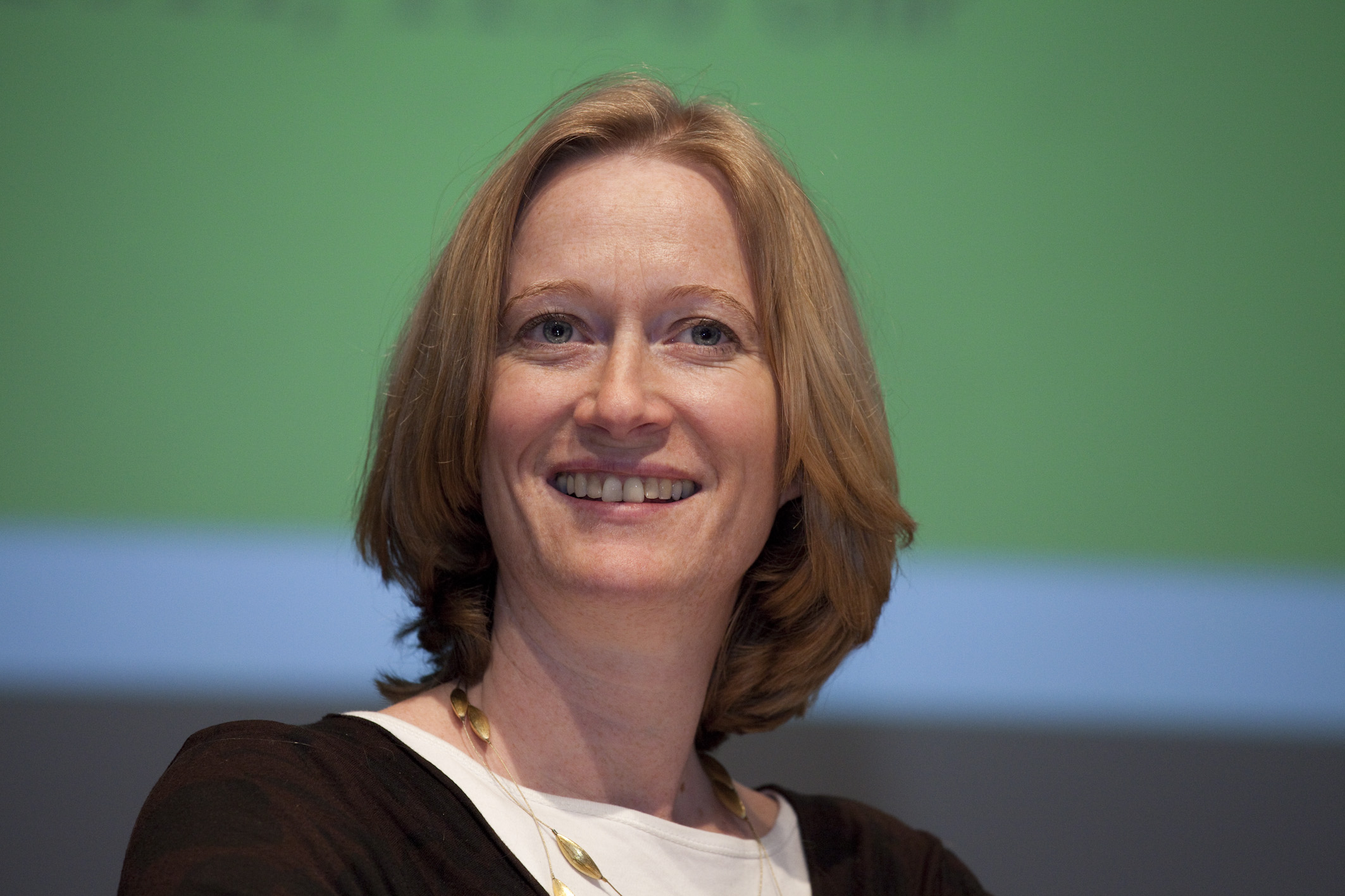
Kerstin Andreae, 2011

- Bernhard Heine (1800–1846), physician and bone expert, invented the osteotome
- Otto Ernst Schweizer (1890–1965), architect
- Eva Zeisel (1906–2011), industrial designer, worked on ceramics and was the designer at the local Maiolica factory
- Martin Grüner (1929–2018), politician (FDP), grew up here
- Rosalinde Haas (born 1932), organist
- Bernd Richter (born 1943), politician, founder of the Ecological Democratic Party, lives locally
- Franz Baumann (born 1953), a former Under-Secretary-General of the United Nations
- Uta-Maria Heim (born 1963), freelance writer of radio plays, poems, plays and crime novels
- Christophe Neff (born 1964), Franco-German geographer, grew up here and did scientific research locally
- Kerstin Andreae (born 1968), politician (Alliance 90/The Greens)
- Ruja Ignatova (born 1980), fugitive, founder of a fraudulent cryptocurrency scheme; brought up locally

=== Sport ===
- Georg Knöpfle (1904–1987), footballer, played 23 games for Germany
- Martin Weppler (born 1958), 400 m, sprinter; team gold medallist at the 1978 European Athletics Championships
- Jonathan Maier (born 1992), basketball player

== Bibliography ==
- Franz Fehrenbacher und Gisela Lixfeld: Stadt im Bild.Schramberg. Sutton, Erfurt 1999. ISBN 3-89702-150-1
- Erich Keyser (Hrsg.): Württembergisches Städtebuch. Band IV Teilband Baden-Württemberg Band 2 aus "Deutsches Städtebuch. Handbuch städtischer Geschichte". Kohlhammer Verlag, Stuttgart 1962.
- Gisela Lixfeld: Momentaufnahmen Schramberg. Ein Lesebuch. Straub, Schramberg 1992.
- Grosse Kreisstadt Schramberg (Hrsg.): Schramberg. Ein Bildband mit Texten. Mit Texten von Franz Fehrenbacher und Rolf Linkenheil. Eigenverlag, Schramberg 1981.
- Museums- und Geschichtsverein Schramberg e.V. und Große Kreisstadt Schramberg (Hrsg.): Schramberg. Adelsherrschaft, Marktflecken, Industriestadt. Straub, Schramberg 2004. ISBN 3-9807406-3-3
- C. Neff, S. Bassing, A. Scheid, C. Jentsch, S. Franger: Emploi du brûlage dirigé pour la protection de l’environnement et l’entretien du paysage – observations sur quelques examples français (Pyrénées Orientales & Gard) et allemands (Raumschaft Schramberg Forêt Noire /Allemagne). In: Alexander Scheid, Christophe Neff, Christoph Jentsch (Hrsg.): Flächenextensivierung im Mittleren Schwarzwald. Ergebnisse und Diskussion der in der Raumschaft Schramberg durchgeführten geographischen und landschafts – feuerökologischen Untersuchungen. (Materialien zur Geographie, Bd. 34). Geographisches Institut der Universität Mannheim, Mannheim 2004. ISBN 3-923750-92-7
