= Jonathan Maier =

German basketball player (born 1992)

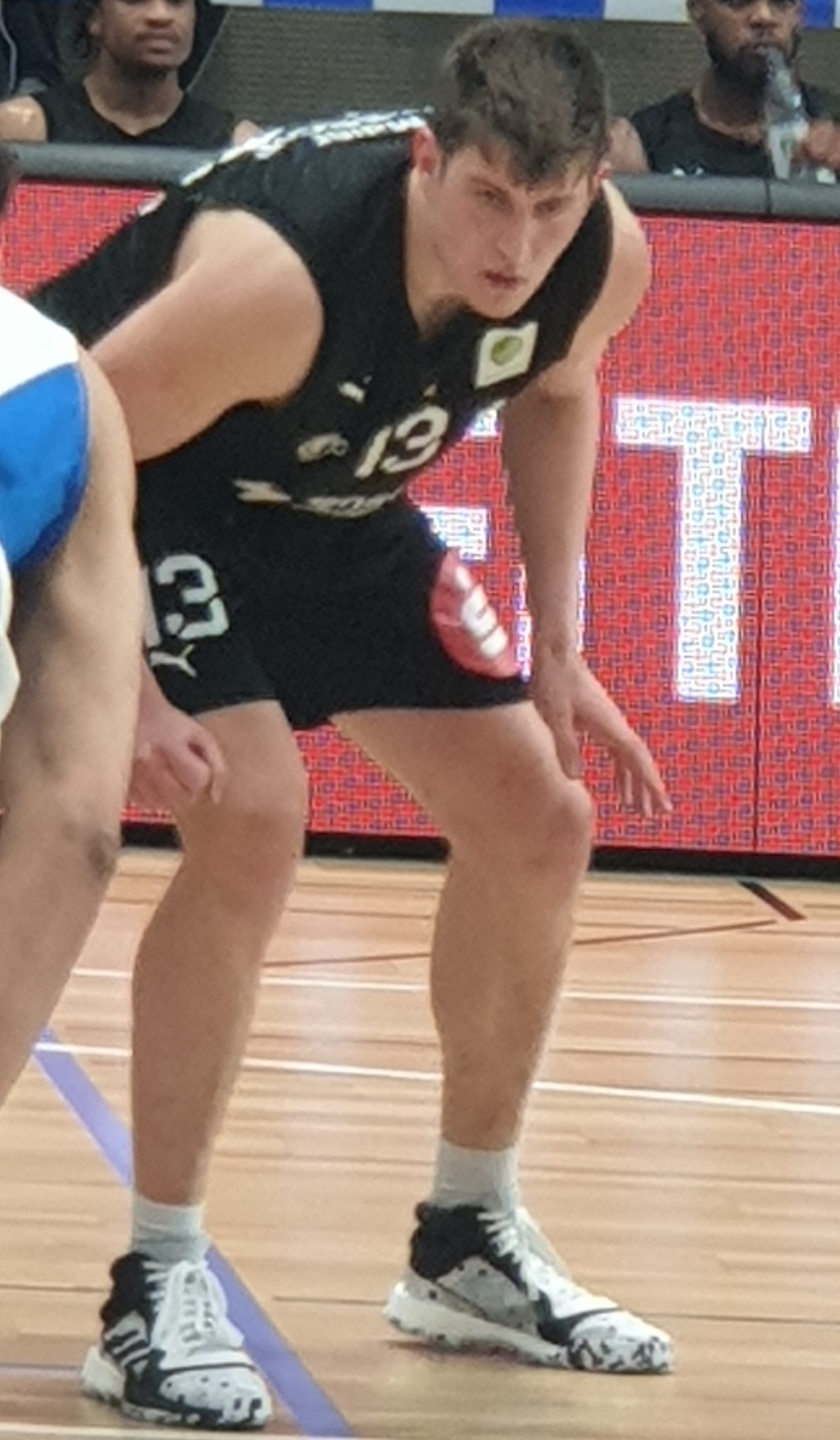
- Maier with Nürnberg Falcons in March 2022

Personal information
- Born: 9 December 1992 (age 33) Schramberg, Germany
- Listed height: 2.12 m (6 ft 11 in)

Career information
- NBA draft: 2012: undrafted
- Playing career: 2009–2026
- Position: Center
- Number: 13

Career history
- 2011–2013: VfL Kirchheim Knights
- 2011–2012: →Ludwigsburg
- 2013–2015: Ulm
- 2013–2015: →Weißenhorn Youngstars
- 2015–2016: →Mitteldeutscher BC
- 2016–2017: VfL Kirchheim Knights
- 2017–2023: Nürnberg Falcons
- 2023–2026: Giessen 46ers

Jonathan Maier (born 9 December 1992) is a former German professional basketball player. He last played for the Nürnberg Falcons and Giessen 46ers of the ProA, and was also a member of Germany's A2 national team in the past.

== Early life ==
Maier started playing basketball at age 12 when his parents moved to Bollschweil.

== Career ==
Before the 2017–18 ProA season, he signed a 3-year contract with Nürnberg Falcons BC.

After the 2025–26 ProA season he ended his career as a professional basketball player.
