= Oberstudienrat =

Teachers in the Higher Service (Höherer Dienst)
Title	Salary grade
Oberstudiendirektor (OStD)	A 16
Studiendirektor (StD)	A 15
Oberstudienrat (OStR)	A 14
Studienrat (StR)	A 13

Oberstudienrat [oːbɐˈʃtuːdi̯ənˌʁaːt] (male) or Oberstudienrätin [oːbɐˈʃtuːdi̯ənˌʁɛːtɪn] (abbreviated with OStR, female with OStR'in; literally "senior councillor of studies" or "senior educational councillor") is an official title for a certain rank of teacher in Germany, mostly employed in state-run grammar schools. An Oberstudienrat is a civil servant who belongs to the höherer Dienst (higher service), a category which is senior to the gehobener (elevated), the mittlerer (middle) and the einfacher (ordinary) Dienstgrad (service rank) in the civil service. An Oberstudienrat is remunerated according to category "A 14", which means a salary of at least some 50 000 € per year, exactly as much as the lower-half Lieutenant Colonels, and after at least two but no more than eight years of service is roughly as much as the lowest rank of judges and state prosecutors. The equivalent title of an official in civil administration is Oberregierungsrat (senior councillor in government administration).

The Oberstudienrat is the position immediately superior to the Studienrat (Educational Councillor). Until the 1980s, this promotion was regularly achieved after a certain period of service. Today, promotion usually requires additional functions and duties; teachers in this rank are usually heads of a subject area, deputy department heads, or commissioners for a specialist field.

About 20 percent of civil servants at educational institutions in Germany are Oberstudienräte (2014).

The following higher ranks are Studiendirektor ("director of studies" or "educational director") and Oberstudiendirektor ("senior director of studies" or "senior educational director").

In the former German Democratic Republic, Oberstudienrat was not used as denominating a rank but solely as an honorary title of high reputation.

== Books ==
- Henrik Bispinck: Bildungsbürger in Demokratie und Diktatur: Lehrer an höheren Schulen in Mecklenburg. 2012. ISBN 9783486705164
- Torsten Gass-Bolm: Das Gymnasium 1945-1980: Bildungsreform und gesellschaftlicher Wandel in Westdeutschland. Wallstein Verlag, 2005
