= Wilhelm Kimmich =

German painter

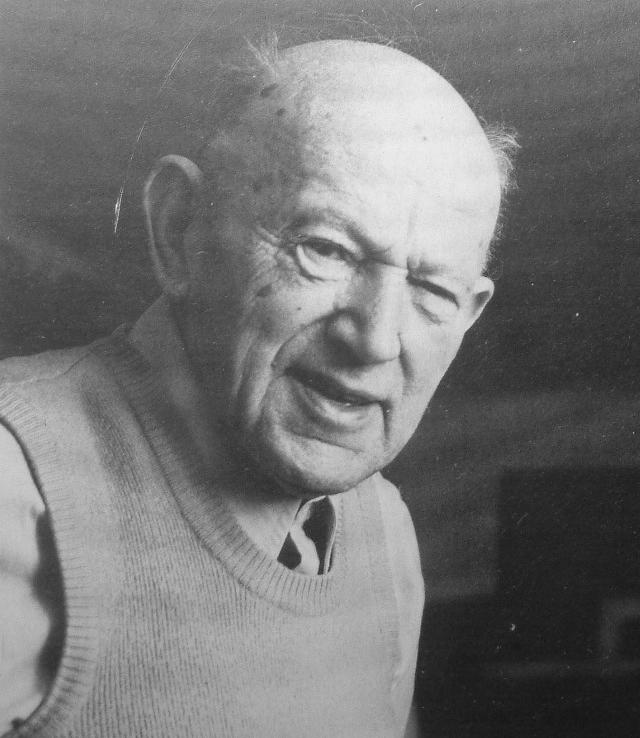
- The painter Wilhelm Kimmich in 1980
- Born: 20 May 1886; Lauterbach, German Empire
- Died: 18 September 1986 (aged 89); Lauterbach, Baden-Württemberg, West Germany

Wilhelm Kimmich (20 May 1897 in Lauterbach, Baden-Württemberg – 18 September 1986 in Lauterbach), was a German painter and is considered one of the most important Black Forest painters of the 20th century.

== Biography ==
=== The early years ===
From 1904 to 1911 Wilhelm Kimmich attended primary school in Lauterbach and made first attempts in drawing as early as 1909. He had a business training and was a soldier in World War I from 1916 to 1918 and returned from a POW camp in 1920. From 1926 till his retirement in 1960 he worked for the Lauterbach Volksbank, since 1929 as a member of the executive board.
He took also part in World War II since 1943 and was released from French captivity in 1946.
Since 1916 Kimmich had been active as a draughtsman and painter and he took drawing lessons with Hans Lembke in Freiburg in the 1920s and with Hermann Gehri in the 1930s, although he later referred to himself as a "self-taught" painter. Since 1934 Kimmich took part in group exhibitions and had his first individual exhibition in 1937.

=== The years of artistic maturity ===
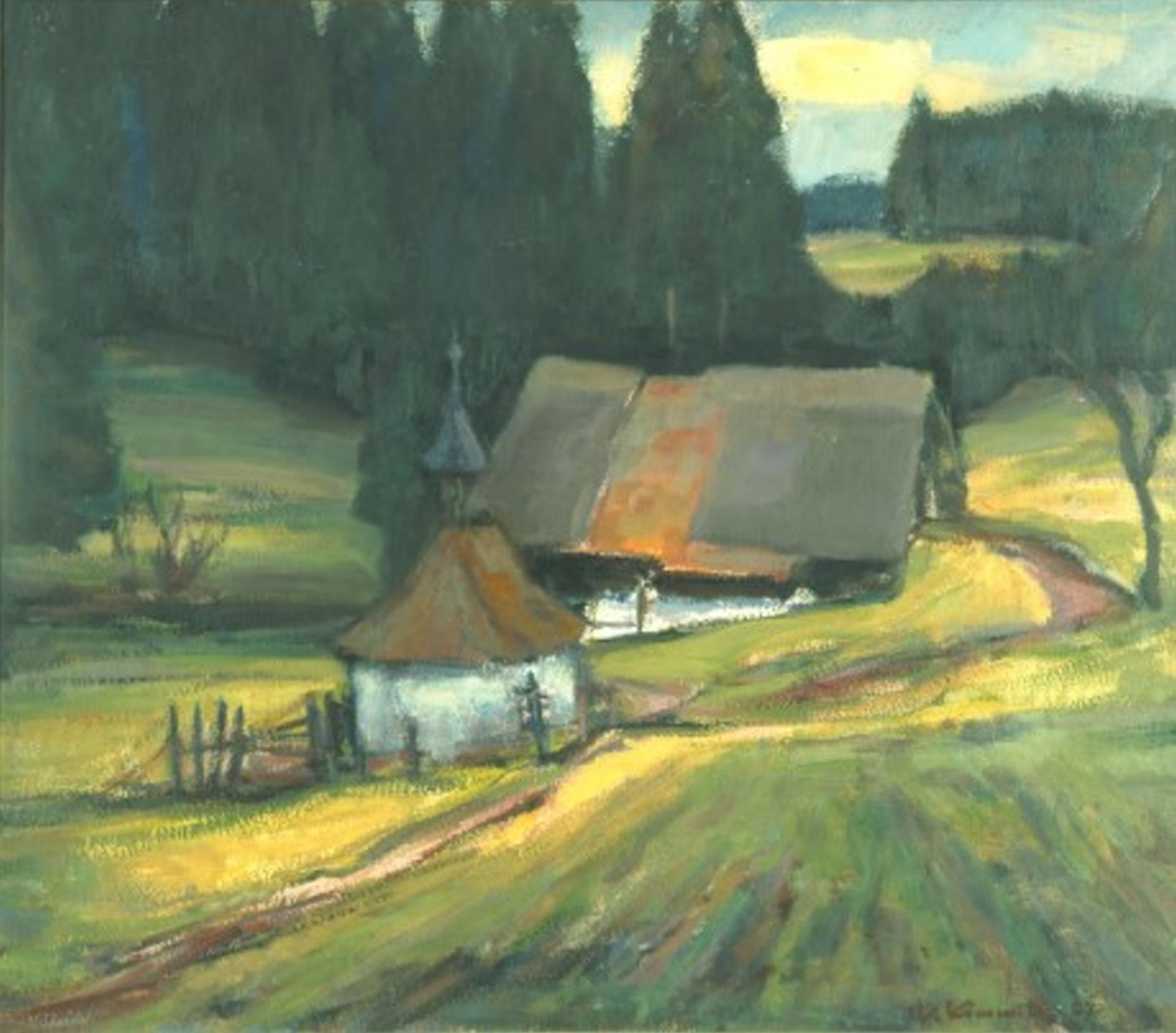
Käppelehof in the summer (1967)

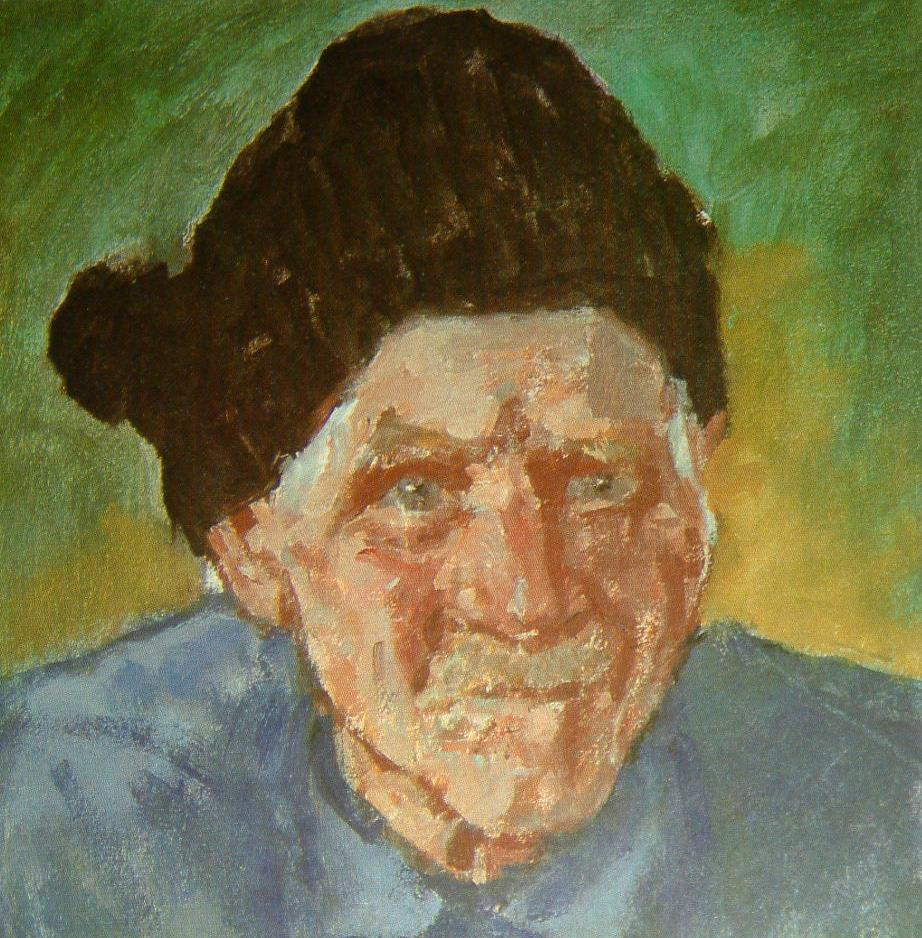
Der Oberbauer David (1972)

Since 1956 Wilhelm Kimmich, together with his painter friend Professor Hermann Anselment (1905-1981), had travelled to Ticino and to Italy.
Although, as a result of these trips, he created landscapes depicting those southern areas Kimmich soon returned to his proper motifs, i. e. the Black Forest and its people. Since the middle of the 1950s he "completely refurbished" Black Forest painting from a stylistic point of view. This accomplishment determines Kimmich's standing in the history of art in the southwest of Germany.
As for his stylistic influences, Kimmich stuck to traditional values. He admitted to influences of Impressionism as well as Expressionism and in his works the influence of Claude Monet and Paul Cézanne are visible as well as that of Henri Matisse and Emil Nolde.

In 1970 Kimmich moved to his new house on Lauterbach's Fohrenbühl, where he had his own studio. He was awarded an honorary citizenship of his birthplace Lauterbach in 1977 His wife Hildegard Lutz from Munderkingen, whom he had married in 1949, died in 1980. For the last four years of his life Wilhelm Kimmich lived together with Elisabeth Sandfort.

=== The last years ===
Kimmich's friend and biographer Egon Rieble comments on Kimmich's last period of artistic creativity: "In his late period of artistic production Kimmich gives up the art of beautiful appearance, to render individual impression to his imagination. In Kimmich's last paintings the fragility of the traditional Black Forest myth is felt in a menacing way."(see Kimmich's last painting)
Until his death on 18 September 1986 the painter had created about 2,000 paintings, in addition to numerous drawings and sketches. What works were still his own were bequeathed to the municipality of Lauterbach along with the condition to present them to the public in a foundation.

== Kimmich's standing as a German painter ==
The emphasis on Kimmich's role as a painter of the Black Forest has often led to neglecting other aspects of his work. There are a number of paintings and drawings of other areas in the South West of Germany and − as mentioned before − of the Ticino and Northern Italy. He was impressed by the people in his neighbourhood and portrayed them very accurately, e. g. his neighbour Oberbauer David in 1972.

== Kimmich's Legacy ==
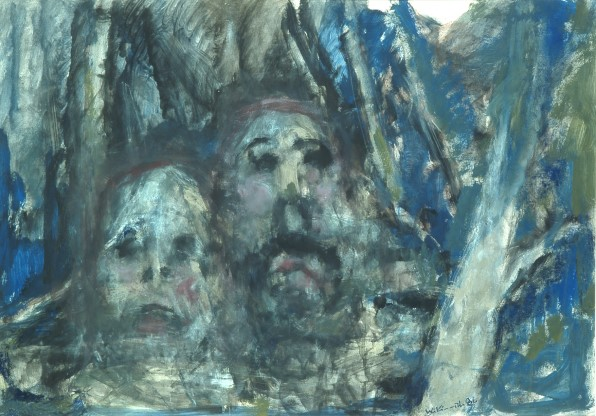
Kimmich's last painting (1986)

Two years after Kimmich's death, Lauterbach established a gallery in the old town hall, where many of Kimmich's paintings, but also works of other, in particular regional, artists are shown. Initiated by Manfred Schlayer (1934 − 2005), the longstanding mayor of Lauterbach, the Kunstverein Wilhelm Kimmich (see external links) was founded in 1997. This voluntary association is instrumental in preserving and presenting Kimmich's work in the gallery, and in publishing a complete register of his legacy. The first part of volume I was published in 1999 and comprises the paintings in private possession. The second part of volume I, comprising the paintings in private possession, was published in 2007.
