= Hardt, Baden-Württemberg =

German municipality

Hardt
- Municipality
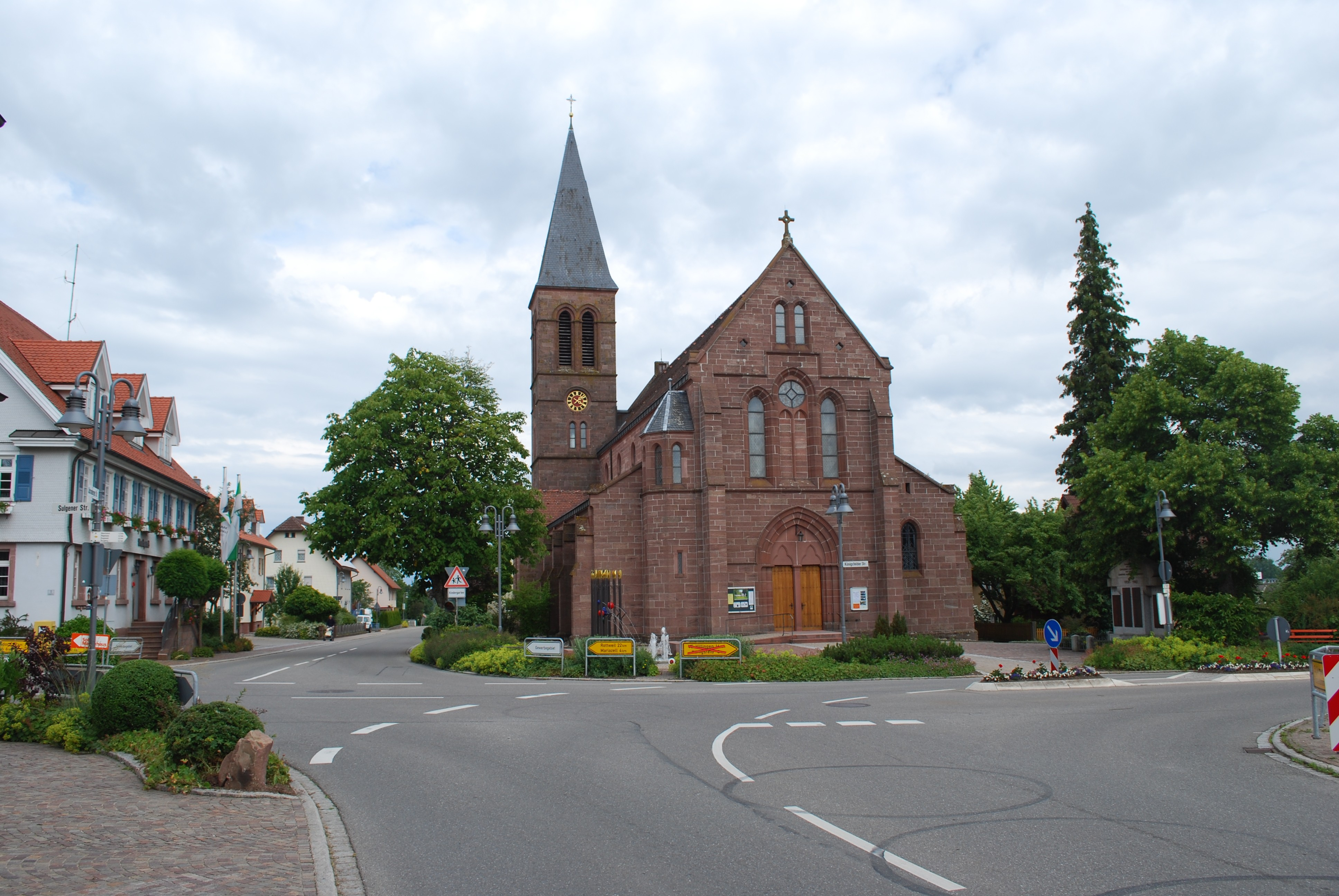
- St. George's Church, Hardt

- Coat of arms

- Location of Hardt within Rottweil district
- Interactive map of Hardt
- Location within Germany Location within Baden-Württemberg
- Coordinates: 48°11′02″N 08°24′41″E
- Country: Germany
- State: Baden-Württemberg
- Admin. region: Freiburg
- District: Rottweil

Area
  - Total: 10.6 km^{2} (4.1 sq mi)
- Elevation: 785 m (2,575 ft)

Population (2025-12-31)
  - Total: 2,459
  - Density: 232/km^{2} (601/sq mi)
- Time zone: UTC+01:00 (CET)
  - Summer (DST): UTC+02:00 (CEST)
- Postal codes: 78739
- Dialling codes: 07422
- Vehicle registration: RW
- Website: www.hardt-online.de

Hardt (German pronunciation: [haʁt]) is a municipality in the district of Rottweil, in Baden-Württemberg, Germany.

== History ==
Hardt was first mentioned in 1416 as "Hard", a property in the township of Mariazell and of the House of Falkenstein, who governed from Schramberg. Schramberg was dissolved by the process of German mediatization in 1806 and its territories were awarded to the Kingdom of Württemberg. Hardt was assigned to Oberamt Hornberg, which was dissolved on 2 October 1810 by a border treaty with the Grand Duchy of Baden. Hardt was subsequently assigned to a new Oberamt, Oberamt Oderndorf. In 1839, Hardt became an independent municipality. The district of Oberndorf was dissolved on 1 October 1938, and Hardt returned to the jurisdiction of Rottweil.

== Geography ==
The municipality (Gemeinde) of Hardt covers 10.17 square kilometers (3.93 sq mi) of the district of Rottweil, in the German state of Baden-Württemberg. Hardt is physically located in the Central Black Forest. Elevation above sea level in the municipal area ranges from a high of 834 meters (2,736 ft) Normalnull (NN) at the Hochwald to a low of 597 meters (1,959 ft) NN on the Kirnbach at the border with Schramberg.

== Coat of arms ==
Hardt's coat of arms depicts, in green, a field with two fir trees upon a field of white. Between the trees is a smaller blazon with a stag upon a trimount, both in yellow, upon a field of blue. This pattern was devised in 1953 from a Schultheiß's seal that featured the firs, but was distinguished from similar coats of arms by the addition of the arms of the House of Falkenstein. The arms of the 17th century Falkenstein zu Rimsingen line are erroneously used on Hardt's coat of arms.
