= Eschbronn =

German municipality

- Municipality
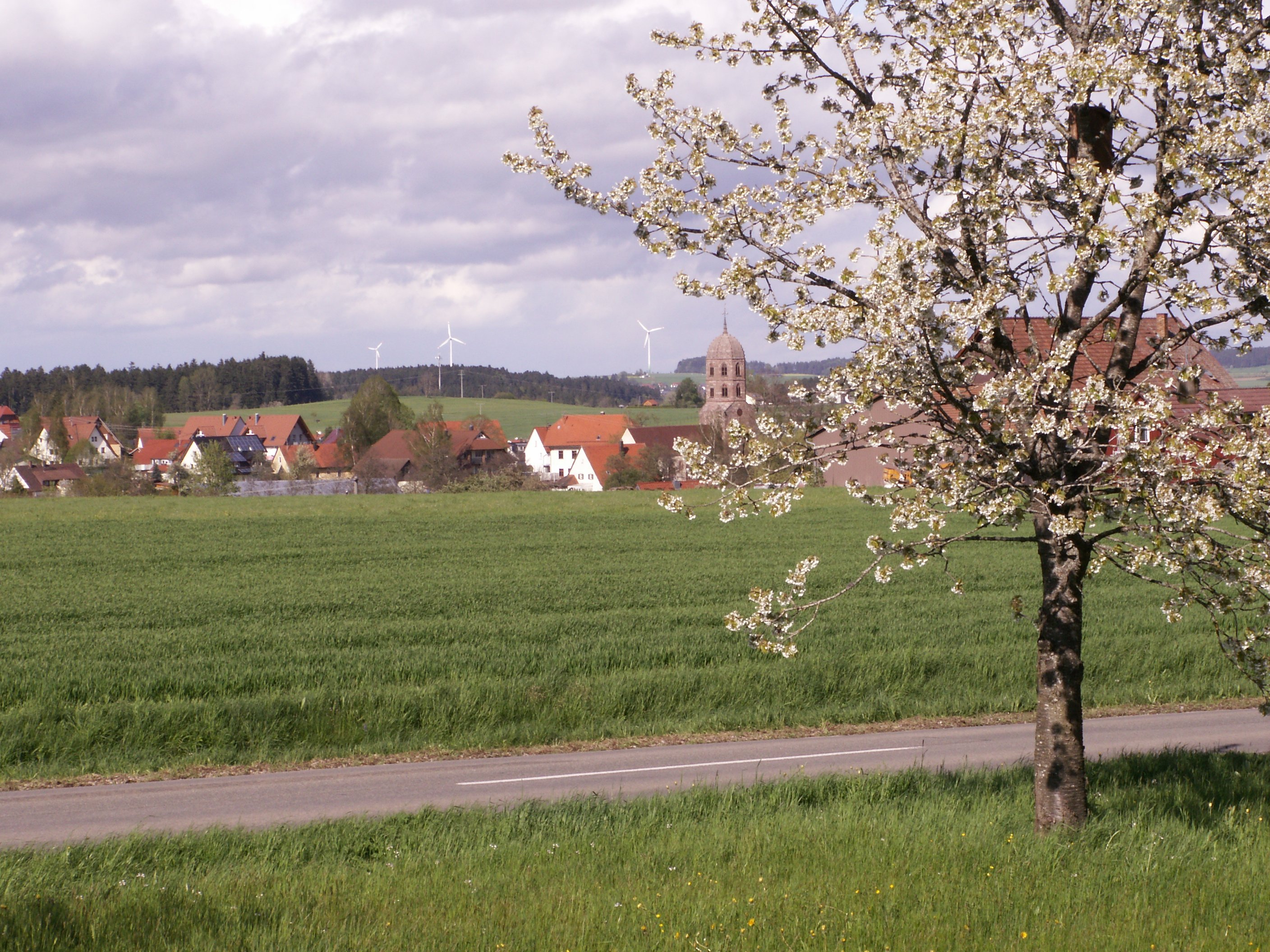
- View of Mariazell, Eschbronn

- Coat of arms

- Location of Eschbronn within Rottweil district
- Interactive map of Eschbronn
- Location within Germany Location within Baden-Württemberg
- Coordinates: 48°11′06″N 08°27′28″E
- Country: Germany
- State: Baden-Württemberg
- Admin. region: Freiburg
- District: Rottweil

Area
  - Total: 11.41 km^{2} (4.41 sq mi)
- Elevation: 700 m (2,300 ft)

Population (2025-12-31)
  - Total: 2,059
  - Density: 180.5/km^{2} (467.4/sq mi)
- Time zone: UTC+01:00 (CET)
  - Summer (DST): UTC+02:00 (CEST)
- Postal codes: 78664
- Dialling codes: 07403
- Vehicle registration: RW
- Website: www.eschbronn.de

Eschbronn is a municipality in the district of Rottweil, in Baden-Württemberg, Germany.

== History and name ==
The municipality of Eschbronn was created on 1 January 1972 by the merging of the towns of Locherhof and Mariazell as part of the 1968-75 Baden-Württemberg municipal reforms. A previous, unsuccessful attempt at a merger was attempted by the townships in 1939. For the 1972 merger, the equality of the townships was emphasized by the choosing of a new name, Eschbronn.

=== Locherhof ===
Locherhof was first mentioned in 1326 as "Affolterunbach", an apple orchard owned by the Imperial Abbey of Rottenmünster, in a legal dispute with another Rottenmünster's properties. The township was conferred in 1483 Hans Christlin von Büdingen, a local nobleman, but remained a property of the abbey. This document was the first to use the name "Locherhof" in reference to the town. Locherhof was divided into two properties, Upper and Lower Locherhof, in the mid-16th century. Both expanded dramatically in the 18th century, though the separation caused much commercial headache. In 1802-03, as a result of German mediatization, Rottenmünster was secularized and all its properties were awarded to the Electorate, later Kingdom, of Württemberg. Locherhof was assigned first to a local district based at Rottenmünster, but in 1806 became an independent municipality. On 26 April 1808, it was assigned to Oberamt Rottweil.

=== Mariazell ===
Mariazell was established by Reichenau Abbey around 1000, but was first mentioned in historical documents in the 1275 Cella Mariae tithe book. The town was devastated by local warfare in 1444 and that time was a possession of the Lordship of Schramberg, itself part of the Habsburg realm of Further Austria.

Mariazell also became a possession of the Kingdom of Württemberg in 1806. It was assigned on 27 October 1810 to Oberamt Oberndorf. Until 1839, the present-day municipality of Hardt was a borough of Mariazell.

== Geography ==
The municipality (Gemeinde) of Eschbronn covers 11.41 square kilometers (4.41 sq mi) of the district of Rottweil, of the German state of Baden-Württemberg. Eschonbronn is physically located at the edge of the Central Black Forest and the Upper Gäu. Elevation above sea level in the municipal area has a range of about 100 meters (330 ft), with a high of 772 meters (2,533 ft) Normalnull (NN) near Mariazell and a low of 670 meters (2,200 ft) NN at the Teufenbach on the border with Dunningen.

== Politics ==
Eschbronn has two boroughs (Ortsteile): Locherhof and Marizell.

=== Coat of arms ===
Eschbronn's municipal coat of arms displays ash tree branch with seven leaves, in green above a blue, invected line, and upon a field of white. This pattern mainly refers to the etymology of "Eschbronn". It was awarded with a municipal flag by the Rottweil district office in 1990.
