= Oberamt (Württemberg) =

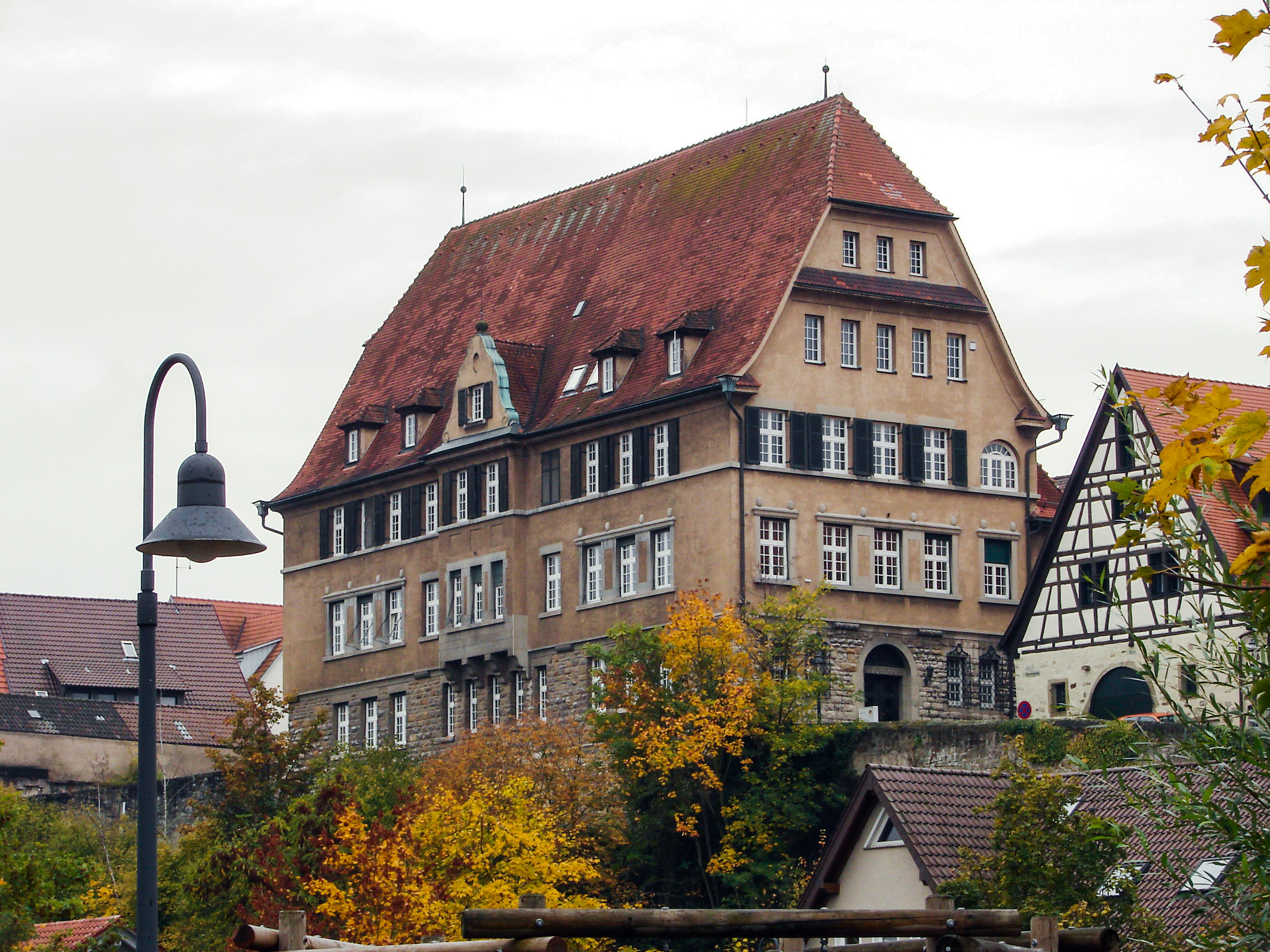
Former head office building from 1908 in Besigheim

Oberamt (German: [ˈoːbɐʔamt], plural Oberämter) was the designation of an administrative unit in the German state of Württemberg, introduced in 1758 instead of Amt. Literally translated, the term means Upper, Senior, Higher or Superior Office. It was in use until 1934, after the Nazi seizure of power, when the Oberämter were renamed Kreise with the Kreisordnung of Württemberg and their number was considerably reduced by mergers in 1938.

== History ==
=== Duchy ===
The subdivision of the Duchy of Württemberg (until 1495 county) into public administration called Ämter reflected in its diversity the gradual growth of the territory. In addition to the secular offices, which made up the largest part of the state, there were monastic, rentier and chamber offices. Usually, a secular office consisted of the eponymous town and the surrounding villages as Amtsorte or Amtsflecken, but the districts differed considerably in area and population, and complicated borderlines with many exclaves marked the map. Some larger offices, such as the Amt Urach, were divided into several Unterämter (“sub-offices”). For clarification, the offices themselves were called Oberamt from 1758 on, without structural reforms being connected with this renaming. The ducal civil servant, who was traditionally called Vogt (about equal to “bailiff”) and who managed the administrative affairs at the official level, held the title Oberamtmann from 1759. From that day on, “all and every secondary title with the bailiff's word was to cease immediately and only the Oberamtmann′s name was to be valid.” He was responsible for the implementation of government measures in his bailiwick, for example by publishing new laws, receiving complaints from subjects and forwarding them to the appropriate higher authorities. He also warned persons who only slightly violated laws. In the Amtsversammlung, representatives of the official town and places of office discussed common matters. For example, it was decided here how the road construction in the district was to be financed. The official assembly also elected its representatives for the so-called "Landschaft".

=== Kingdom ===
After the areas that had been assigned to the House of Württemberg as a result of the upheavals of the Napoleonic era since 1803 were initially administered separately as "Neuwürttemberg", the organisational edict of 1806 - Württemberg had in the meantime risen to become the Kingdom of Württemberg - initiated the creation of uniform structures. In the following years the declaration of intent "An expedient division and merger of the senior and staff offices will be made gradually. and the whole country, regardless of historical and denominational circumstances, will be newly divided into approximately equal senior offices, the number of which was reduced to 64 by 1810 and to 63 by 1819 with the abolition of the Albeck senior office. A special role was played by the Residence City Stuttgart, where the Stadtdirektion fulfilled the corresponding tasks.

The higher offices were subordinate to the Ministry of the Interior and were responsible for all essential areas of state administration, only the financial system was in the hands of the Kameralämter since 1806. Since 1814 every senior office received a public health officer under the title Oberamtsarzt (senior physician). According to the understanding of the state at that time, administration and jurisdiction were not separate, rather the senior civil servant presided over the High Court in personal union. Municipal self-governance and the right to a say of the estates, which had already been temporarily restricted under Duke Carl Eugen, was suspended by King Friedrich.

King Wilhelm I. took over the government in 1816 and immediately began comprehensive reforms, which led to the constitution of 1819 and thus changed Württemberg from an absolute to a constitutional Monarchy. The edicts issued on 31 December 1818 regulated various aspects of the restored local self-government:

- The sheriff's offices became Selbstverwaltungskörper.
- The municipalities of an Oberamt together formed the Amtskörperschaft, a territorial authority with its own parliament (Amtsversammlung) and its own assets (Amtspflege).
- This resulted in a double function of the senior civil servant, who was not only a civil servant as before, but also functioned as organ of the official authority.
- Administration and justice were separated from each other at the Oberamt level.

Chapter V of the Constitution contained detailed information on the administrative structure and rights of municipalities and official bodies. In particular, § 64 provided that Oberämter limits could only be changed by law, i.e. with the consent of parliament. This possibility was only used very sparingly; only in 1842 were major changes made, affecting around thirty municipalities. A bill introduced by the government in 1911 to simplify administration in the sense of cost savings provided for only 42 Oberämter, but was rejected by the Chamber of Deputies.

=== People's state ===
In 1919, renewed consideration was given to reducing the number of Oberämter and restoring the uniformity lost due to the different population trends. After the Landtag had agreed to the abolition of the Cannstatt Oberamt on 1 October 1923, the government attempted to dissolve the Oberämter of Blaubeuren, Brackenheim, Neresheim, Spaichingen, Sulz, Weinsberg and Welzheim on 1 April 1924 by emergency decree, covered by an enabling act. The protests caused by this led to the resignation of the government, the emergency decree was withdrawn and subsequently only the Weinsberg Oberamt was abolished (on 1 April 1926).

=== Nazi dictatorship ===
In 1933, the organs of local self-government were dissolved. After the Oberamtmann had already been titled Landrat since 1928, following the Prussian style, the Kreisordnung of 1934 replaced the names Oberamt by Kreis and Amtskörperschaft by Kreisverband, but did not yet include a change of boundaries. Only with the administrative district reform of 1938 were 27 of the remaining 61 districts abolished.

== Descriptions of the local authorities ==
From 1824 to 1886, all the Oberämter were statistically processed and their history, communities, population figures and the characteristics of their inhabitants were elaborately described in print.

The mainly catholic “new Württemberg” areas, e.g. in Oberschwaben, as described from the point of view of the Württemberg bureaucracy in evangelically influenced Stuttgart, often bear certain characteristics. Quote from the description of Oberamt Ravensburg, p. 29: “The character of the inhabitants is generally praised more than in other neighbouring districts, it is described as simple and trusting”.

The Oberamt descriptions have become sought-after and expensively paid collector's items; therefore all volumes were reprinted in the 1970s. Most of these reprints meanwhile are out of print again. All of them are now available in digital form, see Wikisource.

== Today's traces of the Oberamt boundaries ==
In the former Württemberg region of contemporary Baden-Württemberg, often the Amtsgericht courts are located in the former Oberamt cities.

The ecclesiastical administrative structures of the Evangelical-Lutheran Church in Württemberg also largely reflect the former higher offices. In most of the former cities of the Oberamt cities there is still the seat of a deanery, whose area of responsibility is the same as the former Oberamt. Deviations from this mainly occur in the predominantly Catholic areas and wherever new deaneries were established due to an increase in church members, such as in Ditzingen or Bernhausen.

== List of the Württemberg Oberämter (1811 to 1934) ==
Map of the Württemberg senior offices, status 1926

	Oberamt	since 1973 in Landkreis
1	Aalen	Ostalbkreis
2	Albeck	Alb-Donau-Kreis
3	Backnang	Rems-Murr-Kreis
4	Balingen	Zollernalbkreis
5	Besigheim	Ludwigsburg, Heilbronn
6	Biberach	Biberach, Alb-Donau-Kreis
7	Blaubeuren	Alb-Donau-Kreis
8	Böblingen	Böblingen
9	Brackenheim	Heilbronn
10	Calw	Calw, Böblingen
11	Cannstatt	Stadtkreis Stuttgart, Rems-Murr-Kreis, Esslingen
12	Crailsheim	Schwäbisch Hall
13	Ehingen	Alb-Donau-Kreis, Biberach
14	Ellwangen	Ostalbkreis, Schwäbisch Hall
15	Esslingen	Esslingen
16	Freudenstadt	Freudenstadt
17	Gaildorf	Schwäbisch Hall, Ostalbkreis, Rems-Murr-Kreis
18	Geislingen	Göppingen, Alb-Donau-Kreis
19	Gerabronn	Schwäbisch Hall
20	Gmünd	Ostalbkreis, Göppingen
21	Göppingen	Göppingen, Esslingen
22	Hall	Schwäbisch Hall
23	Heidenheim	Heidenheim
24	Heilbronn	Heilbronn
25	Herrenberg	Böblingen, Tübingen
26	Horb	Freudenstadt, Tübingen, Calw
27	Kirchheim	Esslingen, Göppingen
28	Künzelsau	Hohenlohekreis, Schwäbisch Hall
29	Laupheim	Biberach, Alb-Donau-Kreis, Stadtkreis Ulm
30	Leonberg	Böblingen, Ludwigsburg, Enzkreis
31	Leutkirch	Ravensburg, Biberach
32	Lorch	Rems-Murr-Kreis, Ostalbkreis, Göppingen
33	Ludwigsburg	Ludwigsburg, Stadtkreis Stuttgart
34	Marbach	Ludwigsburg, Rems-Murr-Kreis
35	Maulbronn	Enzkreis, Ludwigsburg, Karlsruhe
36	Mergentheim	Main-Tauber-Kreis
37	Münsingen	Reutlingen, Alb-Donau-Kreis
38	Nagold	Calw, Freudenstadt
39	Neckarsulm	Heilbronn
40	Neresheim	Ostalbkreis, Heidenheim
41	Neuenbürg	Calw, Enzkreis, Rastatt
42	Nürtingen	Esslingen, Reutlingen
43	Oberndorf	Rottweil, Freudenstadt
44	Öhringen	Hohenlohekreis, Heilbronn, Schwäbisch Hall
45	Ravensburg	Ravensburg
46	Reutlingen	Reutlingen, Sigmaringen
47	Riedlingen	Biberach, Sigmaringen, Reutlingen, Alb-Donau-Kreis
48	Rottenburg	Tübingen
49	Rottweil	Rottweil, Zollernalbkreis, Schwarzwald-Baar-Kreis
50	Saulgau	Sigmaringen, Ravensburg, Biberach
51	Schorndorf	Rems-Murr-Kreis, Esslingen, Göppingen
52	Spaichingen	Tuttlingen, Zollernalbkreis
53	Stuttgart Amt	Stadtkreis Stuttgart, Esslingen, Böblingen
54	Stuttgart Stadt	Stadtkreis Stuttgart
55	Sulz	Rottweil, Zollernalbkreis, Freudenstadt
56	Tettnang	Bodenseekreis, Ravensburg
57	Tübingen	Tübingen, Reutlingen, Esslingen
58	Tuttlingen	Tuttlingen, Schwarzwald-Baar-Kreis
59	Ulm	Alb-Donau-Kreis, Stadtkreis Ulm, Heidenheim
60	Urach	Reutlingen, Esslingen
61	Vaihingen	Ludwigsburg, Böblingen, Enzkreis
62	Waiblingen	Rems-Murr-Kreis, Ludwigsburg
63	Waldsee	Ravensburg, Biberach
64	Wangen	Ravensburg
65	Weinsberg	Heilbronn, Schwäbisch Hall, Hohenlohekreis
66	Wiblingen	Biberach, Alb-Donau-Kreis, Stadtkreis Ulm
67	Welzheim	Rems-Murr-Kreis, Ostalbkreis, Göppingen

== Literature ==
- Walter Grube: Vogteien, Ämter, Landkreise in Baden-Württemberg. Stuttgart 1975, ISBN 3-17-002445-0
- Historischer Atlas von Baden-Württemberg, Karten VII,4 und VII,5 mit Beiwort. Stuttgart 1976
