= Vöhringen, Baden-Württemberg =

Vöhringen
- Municipality
- Coat of arms

- Location of Vöhringen within Rottweil district
- Interactive map of Vöhringen
- Location within Germany Location within Baden-Württemberg
- Coordinates: 48°20′03″N 08°39′50″E
- Country: Germany
- State: Baden-Württemberg
- Admin. region: Freiburg
- District: Rottweil

Government
  - Mayor (2022–30): Stefan Hammer

Area
  - Total: 24.71 km^{2} (9.54 sq mi)
- Elevation: 506 m (1,660 ft)

Population (2025-12-31)
  - Total: 4,467
  - Density: 180.8/km^{2} (468.2/sq mi)
- Time zone: UTC+01:00 (CET)
  - Summer (DST): UTC+02:00 (CEST)
- Postal codes: 72189
- Dialling codes: 07454
- Vehicle registration: RW
- Website: www.voehringen-bw.de

Vöhringen (German pronunciation: [ˈføːʁɪŋən]) is a municipality in the district of Rottweil, in Baden-Württemberg, Germany.
