= Villingendorf =

- Municipality
- Coat of arms

- Location of Villingendorf within Rottweil district
- Interactive map of Villingendorf
- Location within Germany Location within Baden-Württemberg
- Coordinates: 48°12′07″N 08°35′20″E
- Country: Germany
- State: Baden-Württemberg
- Admin. region: Freiburg
- District: Rottweil

Government
  - Mayor (2018–26): Marcus Türk

Area
  - Total: 9.33 km^{2} (3.60 sq mi)
- Elevation: 621 m (2,037 ft)

Population (2025-12-31)
  - Total: 3,416
  - Density: 366/km^{2} (948/sq mi)
- Time zone: UTC+01:00 (CET)
  - Summer (DST): UTC+02:00 (CEST)
- Postal codes: 78667
- Dialling codes: 0741
- Vehicle registration: RW
- Website: www.villingendorf.de

Villingendorf (German pronunciation: [ˈfɪlɪŋəndɔʁf]; Swabian: Villingedorf) is a town in the district of Rottweil, in Baden-Württemberg, Germany.

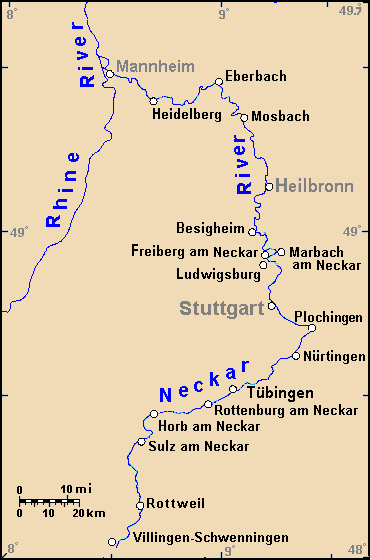
Villingendorf on Neckar River
