= Rottenmünster Abbey =

Coordinates: 48°9′3″N 8°38′6″E

Imperial Abbey of Rottenmünster Reichskloster Rottenmünster
- Status: Imperial Abbey
- Government: Elective principality
- Historical era: Middle Ages
  - Founded: 1221; 804 years ago
  - Refounded as a Cistercian Monastery: 1224; 801 years ago
  - Granted Imperial immediacy: 1237; 788 years ago
  - Looted in Thirty Years' War: first third of the 17th century
  - Burnt to the ground by Württemberg soldiers: 1643; 382 years ago
  - Secularised to Württemberg: 1802; 223 years ago
- Today part of: Germany

Rottenmünster Abbey, also the Imperial Nunnery of Rottenmünster (German: Kloster Rottenmünster), was a Cistercian abbey located near Rottweil in Baden-Württemberg. The self-ruling Imperial Abbey was secularized in the course of the German mediatization of 1802–1803 and its territory annexed to the Duchy of Württemberg. The monastery was closed in 1850. The buildings of the former abbey now house a hospital.

== History ==
In 1221, a branch of a sister community was formed at Hochmauern, south of Rottweil, thus founding the future monastery. On 9 May 1224, Pope Honorius III inducted the monastery into the General Chapter of the Cistercians. The Abbot of Salem, Eberhard von Rohrdorf, appointed the first Abbess, Williburgis. In 1237, Emperor Frederick II raised Rottenmünster to imperial immediacy and commended the protection of the monastery to the imperial city of Rottweil. Through donations and dowries, the monastery collected land between the Black Forest and Swabian Alb. The lands contained about 3,000 inhabitants and produced an annual income of about 30,000 guilders (in 1803). The Abbess was a member of the Imperial Diet and the Swabian Imperial Circle.

After the peak of 100 nuns at the end of the 14th century, the general population settled to between 20 and 30 nuns. During the Thirty Years' War, the monastery was looted by roving troops, and in 1643 the monastery was burned down by troops of the Duke of Württemberg. In 1662, only 14 women under a vow and three lay nuns lived in the monastery. In the 18th century, the number of sisters rose to above 30. As a result of the Final Recess of 1803, the territory of the monastery was secularized and taken over on 23 November 1802 by Württemberg. Some 24 women under vow, four novices, and 14 lay sisters remained in the monastery. In 1826, the last Abbess Juliana Mayer died. In 1850, the last living sister, Franziska Gaupp, left the monastery. This ended its use as a Cistercian abbey.

=== Hospital ===
In 1898, a mental health institution was set up in the convent rooms, from which today's Vinzenz von Paul Hospital developed.

== Abbesses ==
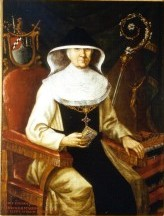
The last abbess of Rottenmünster, Maria Juliana Mayer

- 1237 Ida
- 1290 Adelheid von Grieningen
- 1328 Katharina von Triberg
- 1343 Adelheid Diepolt
- 1351 Anna Boller
- 1388 Katharina Gieringer
- 1419 Brigitta Kopp
- 1436 Elisabeth von Rothenstein
- to 1475 Beatrix von Enzberg
- 1657-87 Ursula Scherlin
- 1687-1725 Maria Williburg Frey
- 1796-1803 Maria Juliana Maier
