= Aichhalden =

- Municipality
- Coat of arms

- Location of Aichhalden within Rottweil district
- Interactive map of Aichhalden
- Location within Germany Location within Baden-Württemberg
- Coordinates: 48°16′N 08°24′E
- Country: Germany
- State: Baden-Württemberg
- Admin. region: Freiburg
- District: Rottweil

Government
  - Mayor (2017–25): Michael Lehrer

Area
  - Total: 25.74 km^{2} (9.94 sq mi)
- Elevation: 716 m (2,349 ft)

Population (2025-12-31)
  - Total: 4,269
  - Density: 165.9/km^{2} (429.6/sq mi)
- Time zone: UTC+01:00 (CET)
  - Summer (DST): UTC+02:00 (CEST)
- Postal codes: 78733
- Dialling codes: 07422, 07444, 07836
- Vehicle registration: RW
- Website: www.aichhalden.de

Aichhalden is a municipality in the district of Rottweil, in Baden-Württemberg, Germany.

== Geography ==
=== Geographical location ===
Aichhalden is located in the east of the Black Forest. It's around 640 to 720 meters above sea level. It borders on Schiltach, Fluorn-Winzeln, Alpirsbach, Schramberg and Schenkenzell.

=== Structure ===
The municipality consists of 2 villages: Aichhalden and Rötenberg.

== History ==
Aichhalden was first mentioned in 1223. Spiritual and secular rulers alternated until the place as part of the Schramberg rule came to the Swabian foothills of the Habsburgs in 1579 and, apart from a Württemberg interlude in 1633/34, remained ante-Austrian until 1805. In 1806 Aichhalden finally came to the Kingdom of Württemberg and in 1810 was assigned to the Oberamt Oberndorf. During the district reform during the Nazi era in Württemberg, Aichhalden came to the newly founded district of Rottweil in 1938.

Before 1933, the current suburb of Aichhalden consisted of the two municipalities of Vorder- and Hinteraichhalden, which were almost independent and made important decisions and decisions separately.

In 1945 Aichhalden became part of the French zone of occupation and thus came to the newly founded state of Württemberg-Hohenzollern, which merged with the state of Baden-Württemberg in 1952.

In the course of the municipal reform, the previously independent municipality of Bach and Altenberg was incorporated into Rötenberg on January 1, 1969. The incorporation from Rötenberg to Aichhalden took place on July 1, 1974. On January 1, 1975, the residential areas Lienberg and Brambach belonging to Aichhalden with 250 inhabitants and 330 hectares were reclassified to Schramberg.
