= Rottweil (district) =

Coordinates: 48.17°N 8.63°E

- District
- Flag Coat of arms
- Country: Germany
- State: Baden-Württemberg
- Adm. region: Freiburg
- Capital: Rottweil

Government
  - District admin.: Wolf-Rüdiger Michel (CDU)

Area
  - Total: 769.48 km^{2} (297.10 sq mi)

Population (31 December 2022)
  - Total: 142,593
  - Density: 190/km^{2} (480/sq mi)
- Time zone: UTC+01:00 (CET)
  - Summer (DST): UTC+02:00 (CEST)
- Vehicle registration: RW
- Website: http://www.landkreis-rottweil.de

Rottweil is a Landkreis (district) in the middle of Baden-Württemberg, Germany. It is part of the Schwarzwald-Baar-Heuberg region in the Breisgau-Hochschwarzwald regional district. Neighboring districts are (from north clockwise) Freudenstadt, Zollernalbkreis, Tuttlingen, Schwarzwald-Baar and Ortenaukreis.

== History ==
The district dates back to the Oberamt Rottweil, which was created in 1806/08 when the previously free imperial city Rottweil became part of Württemberg. In 1934 it was renamed to Landkreis (district). 1938 the two neighboring districts Sulz and Oberndorf were dissolved, and most of the district Oberndorf and a small part of Sulz was added to the district Rottweil. During World War II, a series of Nazi concentration camps, collectively known as KZ Schörzingen-Rottweil-Zepfenhan, were located in the area. In 1973 in another communal reform several municipalities from the districts Horb, Wolfach, Hechingen and Villingendorf were added.

== Geography ==
The district covers part of the mountains of the Black Forest and the Swabian Alb. The Neckar River bisects the district from south to north as it flows towards the Rhine River.

== Economy ==
Today, the economy of Rottweil is predominantly medium-sized. The town of Rottweil, the oldest town in Baden-Württemberg, used to be a flourishing imperial city during the Middle Ages.

The annual average unemployment rate in Rottweil was 3.4 Percent in 2019.

== Coat of arms ==
The imperial eagle in the coat of arms derives from the coat of arms of the free imperial city Rottweil. Below the eagle is a deer antler, the symbol of Württemberg, as part of the district belonged to the kingdom Württemberg well before Rottweil itself became part of it. The shield on the breast of the eagle show the colors of Austria, symbolizing the area around the city of Oberndorf which was acquired by Austria in 1381.

== Towns and municipalities ==
Clickable map of towns and municipalities in the district

Towns
1. Dornhan
2. Oberndorf am Neckar
3. Rottweil
4. Schiltach
5. Schramberg
6. Sulz am Neckar
Administrative districts
1. Dunningen
2. Oberndorf
3. Rottweil
4. Schiltach
5. Schramberg
6. Sulz
7. Villingendorf
Municipalities
1. Aichhalden
2. Bösingen
3. Deißlingen
4. Dietingen
5. Dunningen
6. Epfendorf
7. Eschbronn
8. Fluorn-Winzeln

9. Hardt
10. Lauterbach
11. Schenkenzell
12. Villingendorf
13. Vöhringen
14. Wellendingen
15. Zimmern ob Rottweil
