= Dunningen =

- Municipality
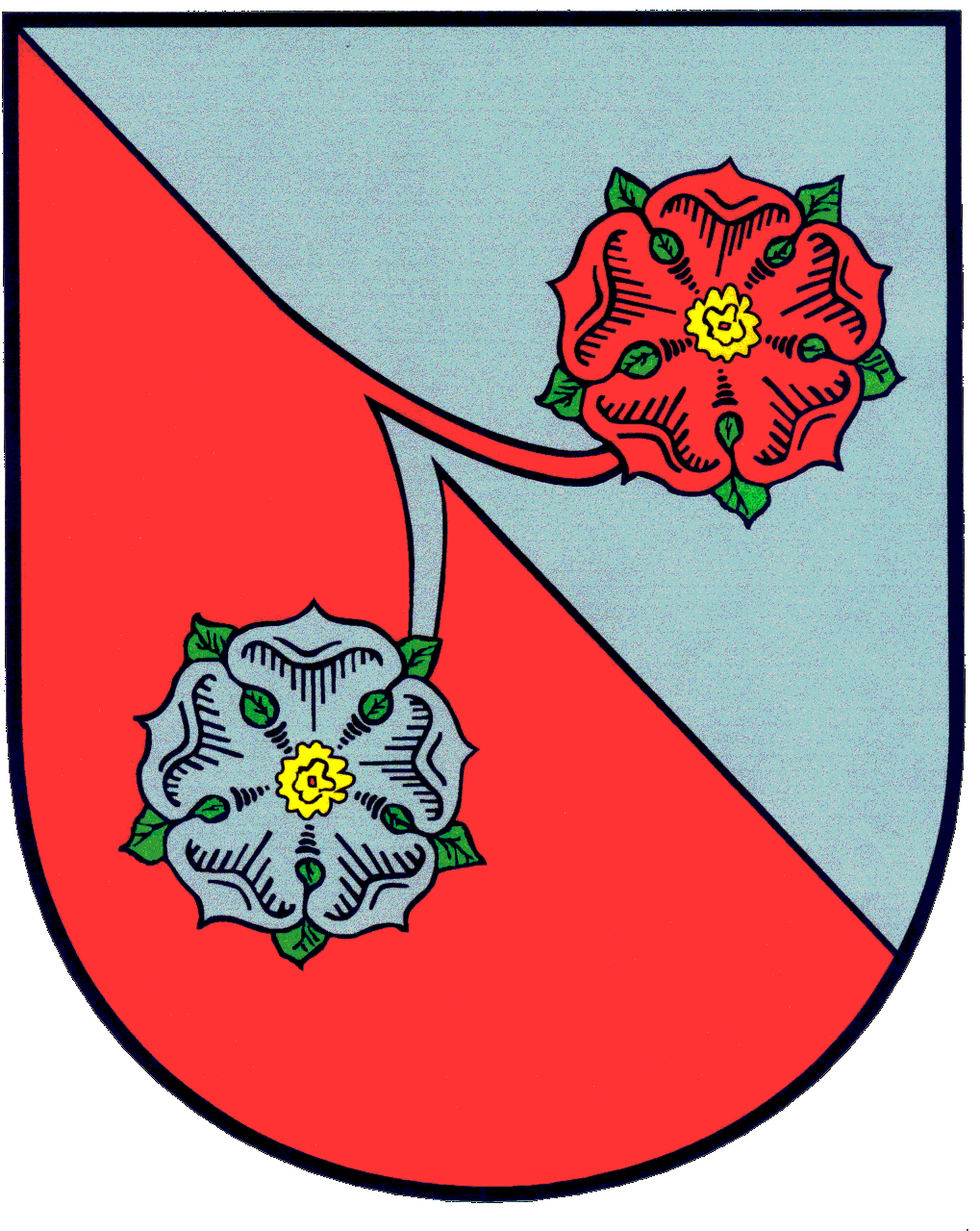
- Coat of arms

- Location of Dunningen within Rottweil district
- Interactive map of Dunningen
- Location within Germany Location within Baden-Württemberg
- Coordinates: 48°12′41″N 08°30′26″E
- Country: Germany
- State: Baden-Württemberg
- Admin. region: Freiburg
- District: Rottweil

Government
  - Mayor (2017–25): Peter Schumacher

Area
  - Total: 48.45 km^{2} (18.71 sq mi)
- Elevation: 677 m (2,221 ft)

Population (2025-12-31)
  - Total: 6,456
  - Density: 133.3/km^{2} (345.1/sq mi)
- Time zone: UTC+01:00 (CET)
  - Summer (DST): UTC+02:00 (CEST)
- Postal codes: 78655
- Dialling codes: 07403, 07402
- Vehicle registration: RW
- Website: www.dunningen.de

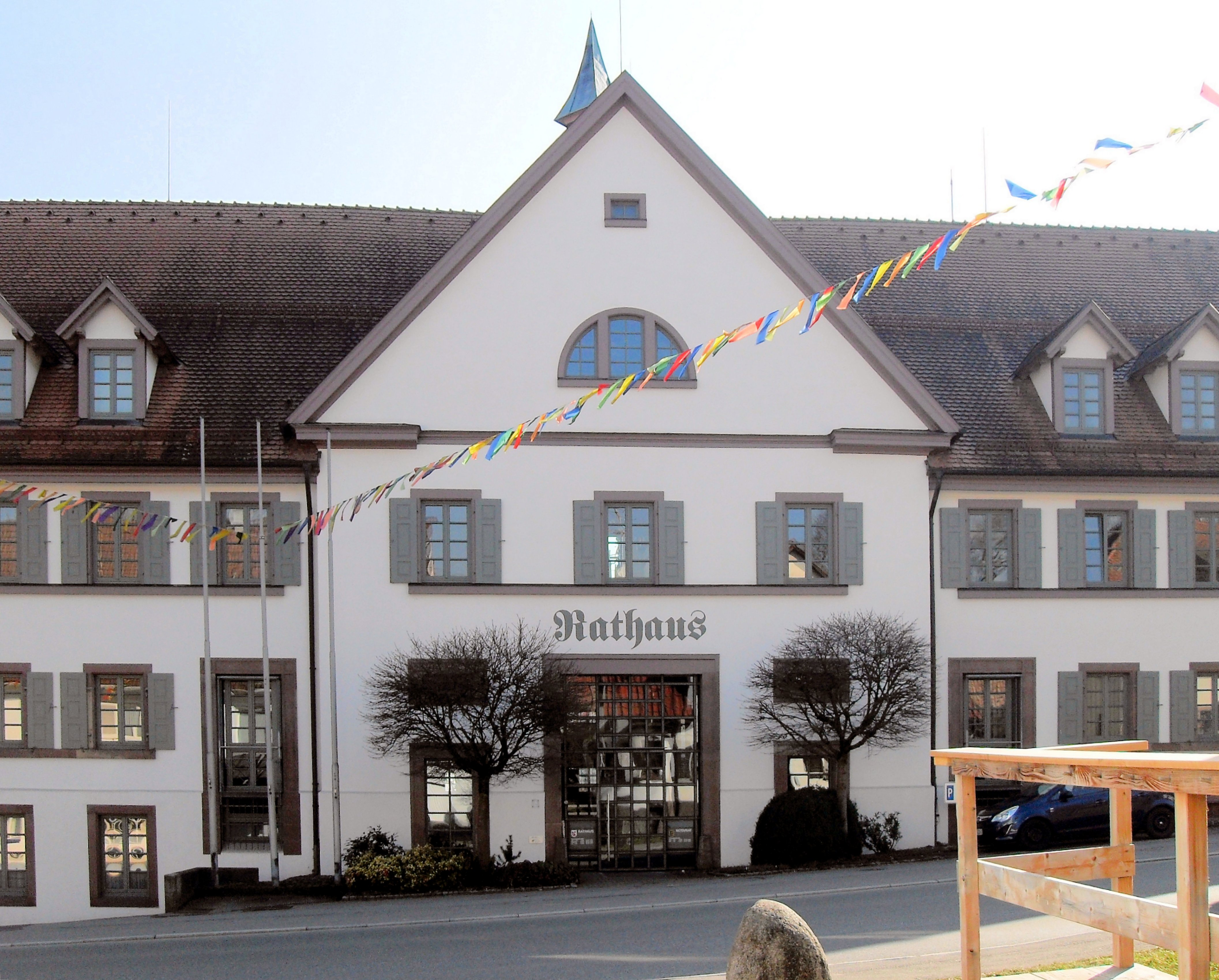
Dunningen Town Hall

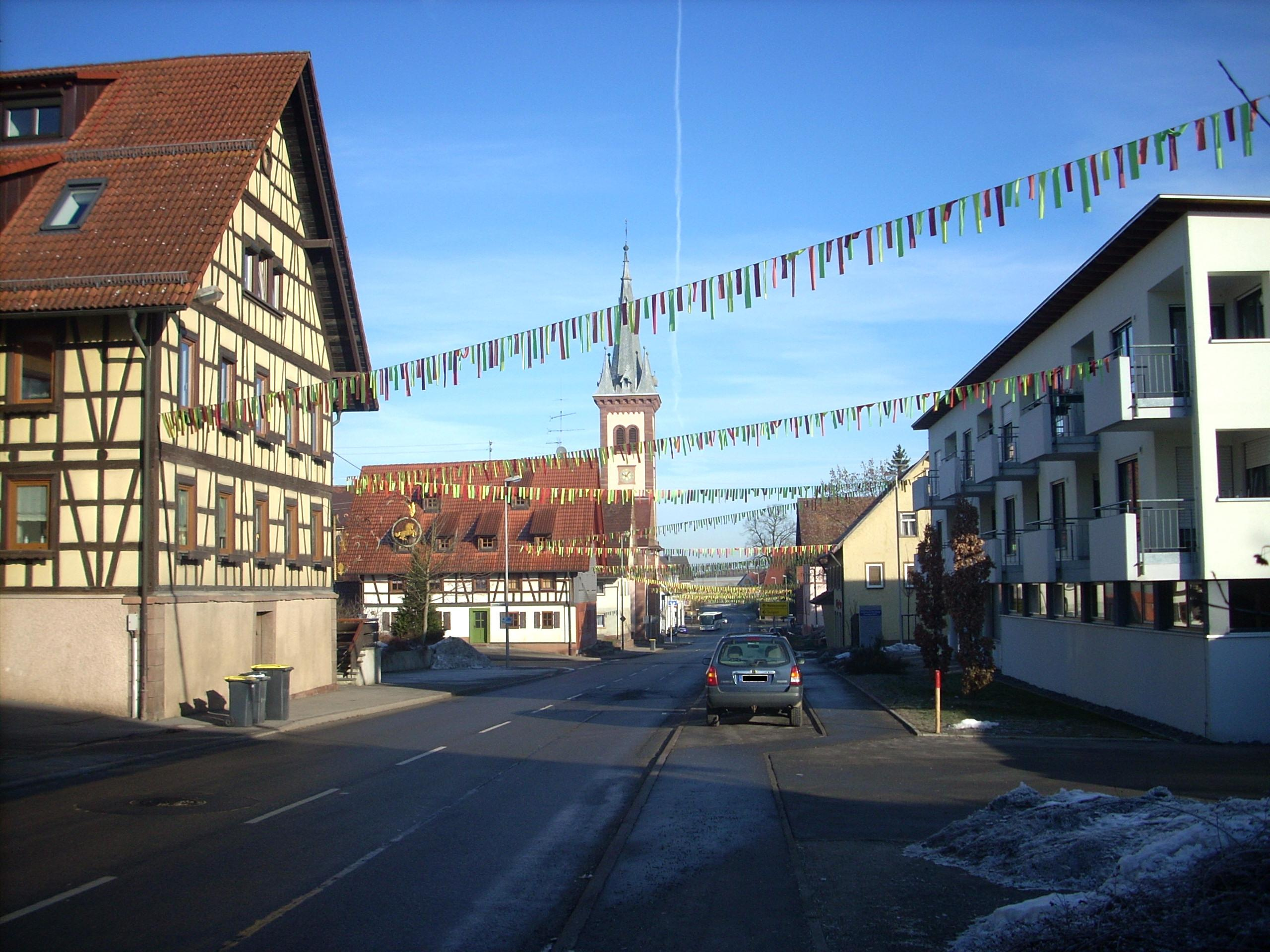
Seedorf Ortsmitte

Dunningen (German pronunciation: [ˈdʊnɪŋən]; Swabian: Dunninga) is a town in the district of Rottweil, in Baden-Württemberg, Germany.

== Dunningen ==
=== Geography ===
Dunningen is located at the centre of the administrative district of Rottweil in the south western part of Baden-Wuerttemberg, Germany. The village is located in the shell limestone area between the Black Forest and the Swabian Alps on a strip of open country that crosses the district from north to south and that is mainly used for agriculture.

It is located on the eastern slope of the central part of the Black Forest, which borders on the Oberen Gäuen in the west.

From an infrastructural perspective, Dunningen is located advantageously on the B462, which is the main road between Schramberg and Rottweil.

Switzerland, as well as Lake Constance, can be reached in one hour, Austria in two hours by car. The French region of Alsace lies to the east and is also within easy reach.

The Eschach, which is a tributary of the Neckar, passes through Seedorf, Lackendorf and Dunningen.

=== Neighbouring communities and districts ===
Dunningen shares the municipal boundaries with Waldmössingen, Beffendorf, Bösingen, Villingendorf, Hochwald, Zimmern ob Rottweil, Eschbronn and Sulgen.

Administratively, Waldmössingen and Sulgen, which are located in northern and western direction, are part of the city of Schramberg, whereas Hochwald in southern and Beffendorf in northern direction, belong respectively to the towns of Rottweil and Oberndorf.

The municipality consists of three districts which are Dunningen, Seedorf and Lackendorf. The district of Dunningen includes the village itself, the villers Auf der Stampfe and Frohnhof, the farms Eichhof, Gifizenmoos, Stittholz, Staudenrain and Beckenwäldle and the dwelling place Hindenburg. The districts of Lackendorf and Seedorf include, in each case, the two villages themselves.

=== History ===
The foundation of the village dates back to the Romans, as a Roman road and a Villa Rustica - a Roman farm - were found in the area. Moreover, there is proof of a Roman fort in the neighbouring village of Waldmössingen. Dunningen was first mentioned in a deed of gift from Count Gerold (+799) to the monastery of St. Gallen in 786. The village was independent until it became part of the imperial city of Rottweil in 1435.

After the Principal Decree of the Imperial Deputation in 1803, the village became part of Württemberg and was integrated into the newly created city district of Rottweil.

Dunningen Castle, which was built in the 11th century, has disappeared completely.

In the course of the administrative reform that took place in Baden-Wurttemberg in the seventies, the municipalities of Lackendorf and Seedorf were incorporated into Dunningen, on 1 August 1972 and 1 January 1974 respectively.

In earlier times, Seedorf was administrated by the imperial city of Rottweil and was handed over to the city of Oberndorf after mediation in the course of the Principal Decree of the Imperial Deputation. After the latter was resolved in 1938, the village was passed over to the district of Rottweil.

=== Religion ===
Even after the Reformation, Dunningen remained Roman Catholic. Up to today, only the church congregation of St. Martin possesses a catholic pastorate. The few Protestant inhabitants are incorporated into the Protestant church parish of the neighbouring village of Eschbronn.

=== Educational institutions ===
Dunningen offers several types of secondary school (Realschule) and a primary school located in Seedorf. Grammar schools (Gymnasium) can be attended in Schramberg and Rottweil, while each of the three municipalities has its own kindergarten. The so-called "Dunninger Forum" is an adult education institution that also operates in the area.

Furthermore, there is a music school and an art school for children and teenagers in Dunningen.

=== Sports ===
The sports clubs of Dunningen and its municipalities are FC Dunningen (Football), TSV Dunningen (handball and gymnastics), TC Dunningen (tennis), TTV Dunningen (table tennis), Shooting Club Dunningen, SpVgg Stetten-Lackendorf 1963, SV Seedorf (football, skiing, handball) and TTC Seedorf (table tennis). The SV Seedorf has the most members of all the clubs in the municipality of Dunningen. Apart from the more classical sporting activities like football, gymnastics and handball, the clubs offer various leisure sport activities including volleyball, rhythmic gymnastics, badminton and dancing. The Skiclub Seedorf e. V. that has its own ski hut, "the SCS- Alpenhaus", in Braz/Austria for friends of skiing.

=== Culture and sights ===
The Museum of local history
The museum of local history, which is located in Dunningen town hall, illustrates the lives of famous sons and daughters of the village, for example Emil Maier, Landolin Ohnmachtand Jacob Maier. Maier was a politician of the Social Democratic Party of Germany, during the times of the German Empire and the Weimar Republic, and became the Home Secretary of Baden some years later. At the level of local politics, he was particularly active in Mannheim and Heidelberg.

Another part of the museum is dedicated to the classical artist Landolin Ohmacht (1760-1834). From 1803, he lived and worked primarily in Strasbourg where he created important monuments of popular personalities of the city and the region. His most famous work shows Susette Gontard, the wife of a Frankfurt banker, who is known in literary history as Hölderlin's Diotima. The third exhibition portrays the life and work of Jakob Mayer, who invented a technique to cast steel in moulds in the 1840s. Apart from bells, he produced iron rails and wheels. In cooperation with Eduard Kühne, Mayer founded the Bochum Association of Mining and Cast Steel Production. Their greatest competitor was the Krupp company in Essen. Mayer was born in Dunningen in 1813 and died in Bochum in 1875 where he has an honorary grave in Kortum Park. The museum is open on the first Sunday of the month from 2 pm to 5 pm.

== Notable residents ==
Notable people born in Dunningen

- William Sohmer (1852-1929), assurance man and politician in New York City
- Hugo Sohmer (1854–1913), manufacturer of pianos, founded in 1872 Sohmer & Co. in New York City
- Landolin Ohnmacht (1760-1834), sculptor who worked mostly in Straßburg gewirkt hat, made the bust of Diotima, love of Hölderlin
- Jakob Mayer
- Walther Straub (1925-1986), a circus artist, the tallest European at the time (2.38 metres tall).

== Regular events ==
During Advent a Christmas concert is performed by the Musical Society Dunningen. In turn with the district of Seedorf, a big village fair is held yearly in the last weekend of June.
