= Herrschaft Schramberg =

Herrschaft Schramberg was the territory of the Ducs (Reichgrafen von Bissingen – Nippenburg) in the Black Forest. It was part of Further Austria until 1804/05. The political center was the town of Schramberg. Herrschaft Schramberg is a toponym of German historical geography.
