= December 1903 =

Month of 1903

<<	December 1903					>>
Su	Mo	Tu	We	Th	Fr	Sa
		1	2	3	4	5
6	7	8	9	10	11	12
13	14	15	16	17	18	19
20	21	22	23	24	25	26
27	28	29	30	31

The following events occurred in December 1903:

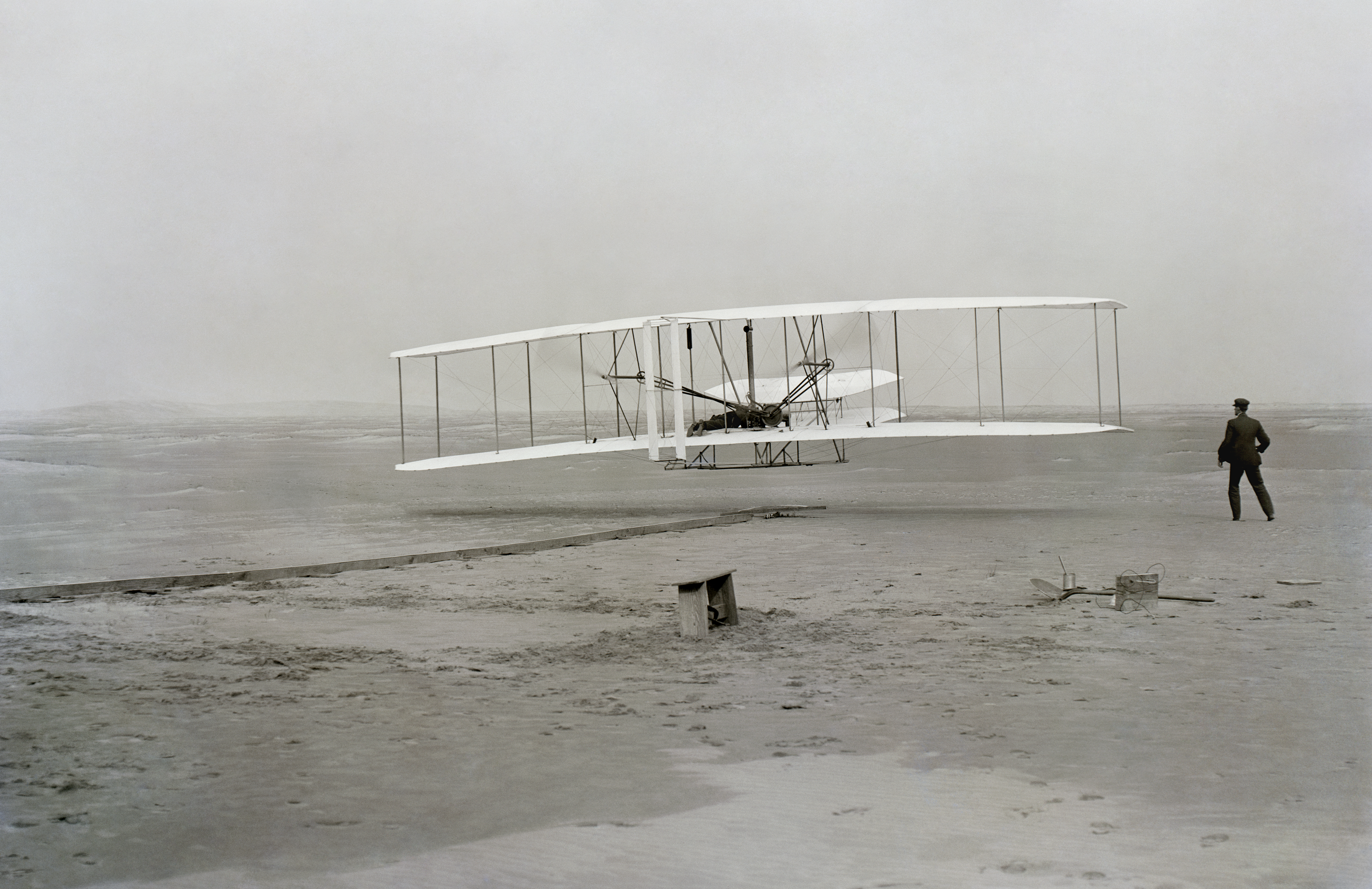
December 17, 1903: An American triumph

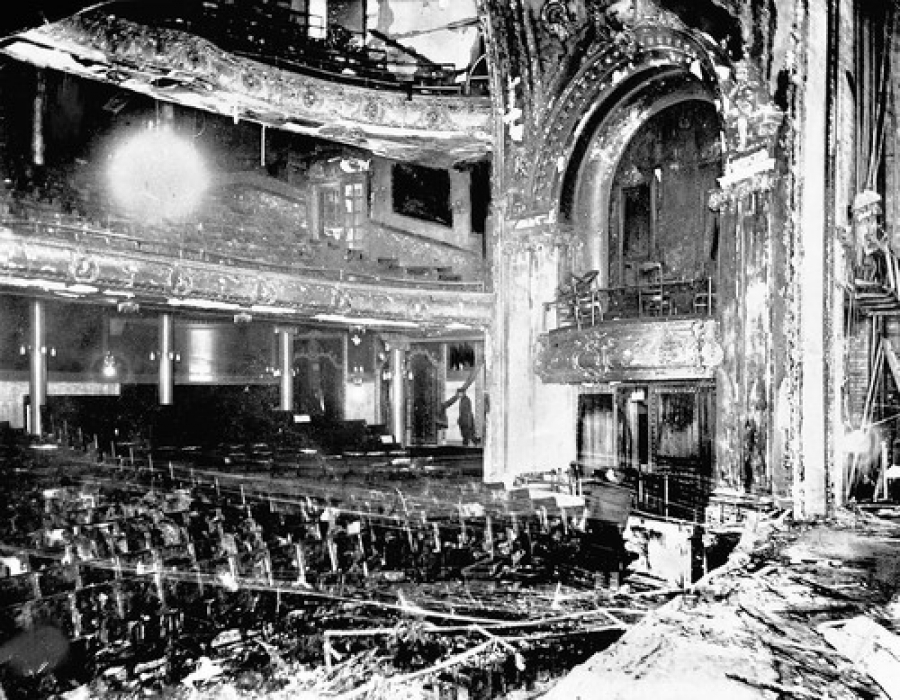
December 30, 1903: An American tragedy

== December 1, 1903 (Tuesday) ==
- Thirty American soldiers who had died in the Philippine–American War were buried with honors at Arlington National Cemetery.
- A United States federal court took possession of all property controlled by evangelist and faith healer John Alexander Dowie in the city of Zion, Illinois.
- At a quartz mine in Nevada, David Crisman, a miner in his late sixties, was killed by a premature blast. 8 years earlier Crisman had survived being trapped in a mine by a cave-in for 46 days.
- Born:
  - Sherman Kent, American history professor and CIA intelligence analyst; in Chicago, Illinois (d. 1986)
  - Nikolai Voznesensky, Soviet politician and economic planner; in Tula Governorate, Russian Empire (d. 1950, executed by shooting)

== December 2, 1903 (Wednesday) ==
- The corvette ARA Uruguay arrived safely in Buenos Aires, Argentina with the rescued members of the Swedish Antarctic Expedition.
- The University of Ottawa building was completely destroyed by a fire that started at 7 a.m., with property loss estimated at $500,000. The fire was believed to have been started by a burning cigarette.
- Born: Jim Sullivan, Welsh rugby league player and coach; in Cardiff, Wales (d. 1977)
- Died:
  - Louis Abrahams, 50–51, British-born Australian tobacconist and art patron, shot himself to death in a basement lavatory at his factory.
  - Victor Roger, 50, French composer

== December 3, 1903 (Thursday) ==
- At about 7 a.m. in Hanley, Staffordshire, England, tallow chandler Thomas Holland was walking to work along St John Street when the pavement opened beneath him and he fell to his death into an old mine shaft filled with poisonous gas. There was no safe way to recover Holland's body from the shaft, which was 121 feet (37 m) deep. After the town council closed the pit, Holland's funeral was held in the middle of the street on December 5. According to a witness, Holland was singing the Christian hymn "When The Roll Is Called Up Yonder" by James Milton Black prior to his death, and reached the line "when the roll is called up yonder I'll be there" just before he fell.
- In Fishkill Landing, New York, 12-year-old Hugh Schofield died after becoming paralyzed during a football game.
- Born:
  - Mary Bell, Australian aviator; in Launceston, Tasmania, Australia (d. 1979)
  - Eva Gräfin Finck von Finckenstein (born Eva Schubring), German politician; in Berlin, Germany (d. 1994)
  - Sydney Goldstein, British mathematician; in Kingston upon Hull, East Riding of Yorkshire, England (d. 1989)
  - Yashpal, Indian revolutionary and Hindi-language author; in Kangra Hills, Punjab Province, British India (d. 1976)
- Died:
  - Abiel Leonard, S.T.D., 55, bishop of the Episcopal Diocese of Utah, died of typhoid fever.
  - John Dalrymple, 10th Earl of Stair KT, 84, Scottish peer and politician

== December 4, 1903 (Friday) ==
- At the Gasson-La Quimsenene coal mine in Montegno, Belgium, the rope of a lift cage broke. 11 miners plunged to their deaths.
- At a tea party in Ingrave, Essex, England, arranged for him to meet local singers, composer Ralph Vaughan Williams collected 19 English folk songs, including "Bushes and Briars", beginning his intensive activity in folk song collecting.
- In Salina, Kansas, the 5-story building of the H. D. Lee Wholesale Grocery company was destroyed by a fire that damaged several other buildings and briefly threatened the city's entire business district. The total loss was estimated to be over $500,000.
- Southern California experienced a sandstorm and multiple wildfires, causing extensive damage.
- Colorado Governor James Hamilton Peabody placed the Cripple Creek region under martial law and suspended the writ of habeas corpus due to the miners' strike.
- A midnight storm wrecked the Danish schooner Sigfried Peterson on Feryland Head, near Cape Race in Newfoundland, killing all 5 crewmembers. Their bodies would wash ashore on December 7.
- Born:
  - Lazar Lagin (born Lazar Iosifovich Ginzburg), Soviet and Russian writer of children's literature and science fiction; in Vitebsk, Russian Empire (d. 1979)
  - Frank Merrill, United States Army general; in Hopkinton, Massachusetts (d. 1955)
  - A. L. Rowse, English historian; in Tregonissey, St Austell, Cornwall (d. 1997)
  - Aaron Siskind, American photographer; in New York City (d. 1991)
  - Anna van der Vegt, Dutch Olympic champion gymnast; in The Hague, Netherlands (d. 1983)
  - Walter Weiler, Swiss Olympic and professional footballer; in Winterthur, Switzerland (d. 1945, heart attack)
  - Cornell Woolrich (born Cornell George Hopley-Woolrich), American author; in New York City (d. 1968, stroke)
- Died: William McKendree Springer, 67, United States Representative from Illinois, died of pneumonia.

== December 5, 1903 (Saturday) ==
- Antonio Maura took office as Prime Minister of Spain, succeeding Raimundo Fernández-Villaverde.

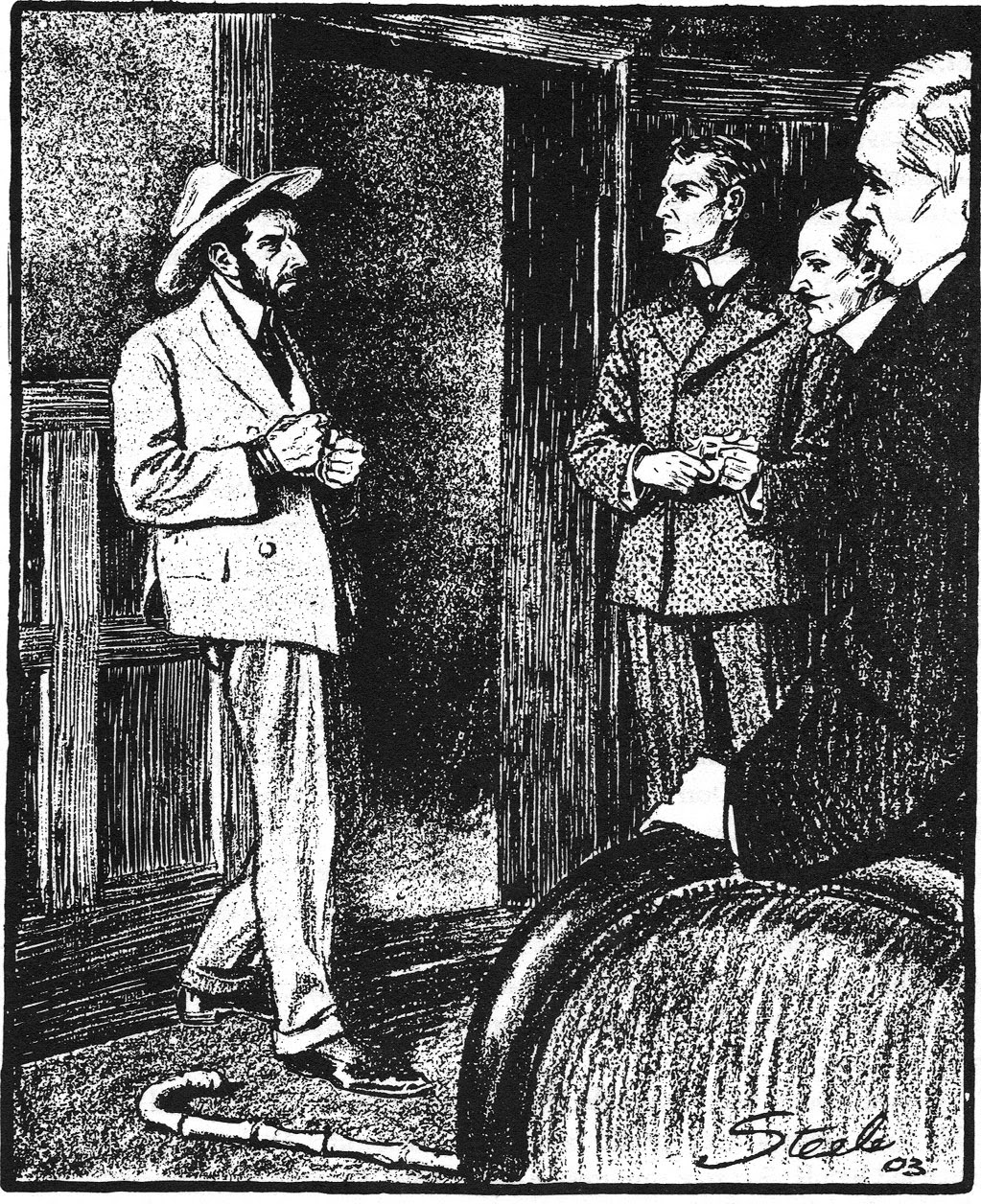
Sherlock Holmes confronts the criminal in "The Adventure of the Dancing Men"

- The Sherlock Holmes short story "The Adventure of the Dancing Men" by Sir Arthur Conan Doyle was published for the first time in the United States in Collier's. It was first published in the United Kingdom the same month in The Strand Magazine.
- Born:
  - María Luisa Escobar (born María Luisa González Gragirena), Venezuelan musicologist, pianist and composer; in Valencia, Carabobo, Venezuela (d. 1985)
  - Arnold Gingrich, American magazine editor and publisher; in Grand Rapids, Michigan (d. 1976, cancer)
  - Johannes Heesters, Dutch singer and actor; in Amersfoort, Netherlands (d. 2011, stroke)
  - Cyril Jackson, South African astronomer; in Ossett, Yorkshire, England (d. 1988)
  - C. F. Powell, British physicist, recipient of the Nobel Prize in Physics; in Tonbridge, Kent, England (d. 1969, heart attack)
- Died: Henry Burk, 53, United States Representative from Pennsylvania

== December 6, 1903 (Sunday) ==
- Born:
  - Carlo Belli, Italian art critic, theorist and writer; in Rovereto, Italy (d. 1991)
  - Gaito Gazdanov, Russian writer; in Saint Petersburg, Russian Empire (d. 1971)
  - E. D. Jones, Librarian of the National Library of Wales; in Llangeitho, Ceredigion, Wales (d. 1987)
  - Mykola Kolessa, Ukrainian composer and conductor; in Sambir, Austria-Hungary (d. 2006)
  - Tony Lazzeri, American Major League Baseball second baseman; in San Francisco, California (d. 1946, fall)
  - Kathryn McGuire, American dancer and actress; in Peoria, Illinois (d. 1978)
  - Will Paynter, Welsh miners' leader; in Whitchurch, Cardiff, Wales (d. 1984)
  - Symplicjusz Zwierzewski, Polish footballer (d. 1986)

== December 7, 1903 (Monday) ==
- Horace Edgar Buckridge, a 27-year-old veteran of the Second Boer War and former member of the Discovery Expedition, died at sea aboard his yacht Kia Ora. Buckridge had intended to sail the yacht around the world from New Zealand to London, but sustained an injury aboard the yacht near the Chatham Islands. His sailing companion, Sowden, who had no prior sailing experience and had failed to help the injured Buckridge, would return to New Zealand alone.
- Despite official denials, newspapers ran detailed stories about the alleged murder of Czech actress Clara Zeigler by Archduchess Elisabeth Marie of Austria, granddaughter of both Franz Joseph I of Austria and Leopold II of Belgium, who had supposedly discovered Zeigler to be the mistress of her husband, Prince Otto of Windisch-Graetz. Reports stated that the archduchess shot and seriously wounded a valet who attempted to bar her entry to a room where Prince Otto was entertaining Zeigler, and then shot and mortally wounded Zeigler with a revolver which Prince Otto had given her. Archduchess Elisabeth's father, Rudolf, Crown Prince of Austria, had died in an apparent murder-suicide with his mistress, Baroness Mary Vetsera, in 1889.
- In Dessau, Germany, Frau Fischer, a lion tamer, was fatally attacked by four lions with which she was performing. Her death was witnessed by a large crowd, including her own children, and many spectators were injured in the ensuing panic.
- The opera Muirgheis, composed by Thomas O'Brien Butler, received its world premiere at the Theatre Royal, Dublin. It was the first opera with a libretto in the Irish language (written by Thadgh O'Donoghue).
- During the six-day bicycle race at Madison Square Garden in New York City, a spectator nearly caused a human crush by lighting paper underneath another spectator's chair and shouting "Fire". Several hundred people fled from their seats, but calm returned after a few minutes. The team of American cyclist Robert Walthour and Australian cyclist Ben Munroe would eventually win the race.
- The Wyanoke Hotel, a 5-story building at Ninth Avenue and 53rd Street in Manhattan, New York City, was destroyed by fire. No deaths were reported.
- U.S. President Theodore Roosevelt submitted his third Annual Message to the United States Congress. Concerning immigration to the United States, Roosevelt commented, "We can not have too much immigration of the right kind, and we should have none at all of the wrong kind." Discussing the problem of public corruption, Roosevelt wrote, "There can be no crime more serious than bribery. Other offenses violate one law while corruption strikes at the foundation of all law." Roosevelt described the October resolution of the Alaska boundary dispute as "satisfactory in every way." Roosevelt also stated, "I recommend that an appropriation be made for building light-houses in Hawaii, and taking possession of those already built. The Territory should be reimbursed for whatever amounts it has already expended for light-houses." In the final part of the message, Roosevelt discussed at length the November separation of Panama from Colombia and the importance of building a Panama Canal, stating, "At last the right to begin this great undertaking is made available. Panama has done her part. All that remains is for the American Congress to do its part, and forthwith this Republic will enter upon the execution of a project colossal in its size and of well-nigh incalculable possibilities for the good of this country and the nations of mankind."
- Born:
  - Danilo Blanuša, Croatian Yugoslav mathematician, physicist and engineer; in Osijek, Austria-Hungary (d. 1987)
  - Aleksandr Leipunskii, Polish-born Soviet physicist; in Dragli, Sokolsky District, Grodno Province, Russian Poland (d. 1972)
  - Brian Lewis, 2nd Baron Essendon, British racing driver, baronet and peer; in Edmonton, Middlesex, England (d. 1978)
  - Shūzō Takiguchi, Japanese poet, art critic and artist; in Toyama Prefecture, Japan (d. 1979)
  - Alexander van Geen, Dutch Olympic modern pentathlete and Royal Netherlands Navy artillery officer; in The Hague, Netherlands (d. 1942, killed in action at the Battle of the Java Sea)
  - Roosevelt Williams, American blues pianist; in Bastrop, Texas (d. 1996)
- Died:
  - James Addison Ingle, 36, Episcopal bishop of the Missionary District of Hankou, China, died of a fever.
  - Arthur Milchhöfer, 51, German archaeologist

== December 8, 1903 (Tuesday) ==
- The New York Times reported that there was no truth to the story that Archduchess Elisabeth Marie of Austria had murdered an actress. However, later rumors suggested that the story was in fact true. Archduchess Elisabeth Marie would give birth to a son on March 22, 1904.

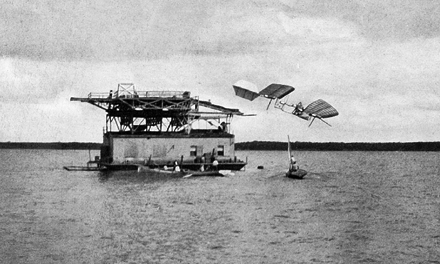
1903: Unsuccessful test flight of Langley Aerodrome

- The Aerodrome A, a piloted aircraft designed by Secretary of the Smithsonian Institution Samuel Langley, which had failed to fly on October 7, made its second unsuccessful test flight from a houseboat on the Potomac River in Washington, D.C. The aircraft, piloted by Langley's assistant, Charles M. Manly, collapsed on itself and plunged into the river after takeoff, briefly trapping Manly under the wreckage. Manly was unharmed, but this second failure ended Langley's research into heavier-than-air flight.
- Canadian professional boxer Sam Langford defeated American boxer Joe Gans, the World Lightweight Champion, in a 15-round fight. Langford was not eligible to take over Gans' championship because he was over the 135-pound (61 kg) weight limit.
- In Norfolk, Virginia, white Democrats stormed the Berkeley Improvement Board office in a racially motivated attack against African American officials. The bell of the Berkeley Avenue Baptist Church sounded the signal for the attack.
- Born:
  - Zelma Watson George (born Zelma Watson), American opera singer and philanthropist; in Hearne, Texas (d. 1994)
  - Louis-Marie Régis, Canadian philosopher and Dominican priest; in Hébertville, Quebec, Canada (d. 1988)
  - Zoltán Székely, Hungarian violinist and composer; in Kocs, Austria-Hungary (d. 2001)
- Died:
  - Herbert Spencer, 83, English philosopher
  - Henry Clay Trumbull, 73, American clergyman and author

== December 9, 1903 (Wednesday) ==
- The Glasgow East End Industrial Exhibition opened in Duke Street, Glasgow, Scotland. It would run until April 9, 1904, attracting 908,897 visitors. The opening ceremony, led by Alexander Bruce, 6th Lord Balfour of Burleigh, was followed by a choral concert given by the Royal Marines.
- Born:
  - Konrad Friedrich Bauer, German type designer; in Hamburg, Germany (d. 1970)
  - Angelo Dell'Acqua, Italian Roman Catholic cardinal; in Milan, Italy (d. 1972, heart attack)
  - Elisabeth Charlotte Gloeden (born Elisabeth Charlotte Kuznitzky), member of the German Resistance (d. 1944, executed by guillotine)
  - Adolf Maislinger, German politician, German Resistance member and survivor of Dachau concentration camp; in Munich, Germany (d. 1985)
- Died:
  - August Hjalmar Edgren, 63, Swedish American linguist and professor
  - Sebastián Herrero y Espinosa de los Monteros C.O., 81, Spanish Roman Catholic cardinal

== December 10, 1903 (Thursday) ==
- Queen Alexandra of the United Kingdom was saved from a fire in the bedrooms at Sandringham House by her Woman of the Bedchamber, Charlotte Knollys. Knollys would later receive a gold medal for her heroism.
- The schooner yacht Roamer was wrecked on Rum Cay in the Bahamas.
- Five days before his scheduled hanging, convicted murderer Ernest Cashel escaped from his cell at the North-West Mounted Police barracks in Calgary, Northwest Territories, Canada. He would be recaptured on January 24, 1904, and executed on February 2, 1904.
- Born:
  - Márton Bukovi, Hungarian footballer and manager; in Budapest, Austria-Hungary (d. 1985)
  - Emilio Giuseppe Dossena, Italian painter; in Cavenago d'Adda, Lombardy, Italy (d. 1987, leukemia)
  - Johannes Even, German politician; in Essen, Germany (d. 1964)
  - George J. Lewis, Mexican-born American actor; in Guadalajara, Jalisco, Mexico (d. 1995, stroke)
  - Una Merkel, American actress; in Covington, Kentucky (d. 1986)
  - Mary Norton (born Kathleen Mary Pearson), British children's author; in Highbury, London Borough of Islington, England (d. 1992, stroke)
  - Luis H. Salgado, Ecuadorian composer; in Cayambe, Ecuador (d. 1977)
  - Winthrop Sargeant, American music critic, violinist and translator; in San Francisco, California (d. 1986)
  - René Sylviano (a.k.a. Sylvère Caffot), French film score composer; in Mantes-la-Jolie, Yvelines, France (d. 1993)
- Died:
  - Adolphus Drucker, 35, British Member of Parliament
  - Bancroft Gherardi, 71, United States Navy rear admiral
  - Levi Parsons Gillette, 71, American farmer and politician
  - Baron Arthur de Rothschild, 52, French philatelist, died of heart failure.
  - Sir Michael Shaw-Stewart, 7th Baronet, 77, British Member of Parliament

== December 11, 1903 (Friday) ==
- Orville Wright returned from Dayton, Ohio, to the Wright brothers' camp near Kitty Hawk, North Carolina, with new steel propeller shafts for the Wright Flyer.
- Born: Hans Bauer, German Olympic cross-country skier; in Bayrischzell, Bavaria, Germany (d. 1992)
- Died:
  - James Scarlett, 4th Baron Abinger, 32, British peer, died of heart failure caused by an accidental fall.
  - Martin Hattala, 82, Slovak pedagogue
  - Patrick McShane, 45, Australian cricketer
  - Henry Stanley, 3rd Baron Stanley of Alderley, 76, English historian
  - Heinrich Tønnies, 78, German-Danish photographer

== December 12, 1903 (Saturday) ==
- Troops of the British Indian Army, commanded by Brigadier-General James Macdonald and accompanied by Colonel Francis Younghusband, crossed the pass of Jelep La and entered Tibet.
- Rock climbers James William Puttrell, William Smithard and Arnold M. Bennett made the first ascent of the High Tor, a cliff face in Matlock Bath, Derbyshire, England.
- Born: Yasujirō Ozu, Japanese film director; in Tokyo, Empire of Japan (d. 1963, throat cancer)
- Died: Marcus Baker, 54, American naturalist, explorer and journalist, died of a heart attack.

== December 13, 1903 (Sunday) ==
- Born:
  - Ella Baker, American civil rights activist; in Norfolk, Virginia (d. 1986)
  - Norman Foster (born Norman Foster Hoeffer), American actor, film director and screenwriter; in Richmond, Indiana (d. 1976)
  - Marie Mejzlíková, Czech track and field athlete; in Prague, Austria-Hungary (d. 1994)
  - Carlos Montoya, Spanish flamenco guitarist; in Madrid, Spain (d. 1993)
  - Juan Pablo Pérez Alfonzo, Venezuelan politician, diplomat and lawyer; in Caracas, Venezuela (d. 1979)
  - John Piper, English artist; in Epsom, Surrey, England (d. 1992)
  - José López Rubio, Spanish playwright, screenwriter and film director; in Motril, Province of Granada, Spain (d. 1996)
  - Al Smith, American Major League Baseball pitcher; in Norristown, Pennsylvania (d. 1995)
- Died: Alexander McDonald, 71, United States Senator from Arkansas

== December 14, 1903 (Monday) ==
- Police discovered the body of 19-year-old domestic servant Mary Ann Worsman in the Leeds and Liverpool Canal near Bingley, England, the day after a man found her clothing, partially covered by cocoanut matting, near Swine Bridge. The case was believed to be a murder but would never be solved.
- In North Carolina, the Wright brothers made their first attempt at a powered flight with the Wright Flyer. Wilbur Wright won a coin toss to determine who would make the first flight, but the aircraft stalled and landed after climbing a few feet, sustaining slight damage.
- Born: Walter Rangeley, British Olympic sprinter; in Salford, Greater Manchester, England (d. 1982)

== December 15, 1903 (Tuesday) ==
- Italian American food cart vendor Italo Marchiony received a United States patent for inventing a machine to make ice cream cones.
- In Tombstone, Arizona, train robbers Billy Stiles and Burt Alvord broke out of jail. 11 other prisoners also escaped.
- Born:
  - Princess Elisabeth Helene of Thurn and Taxis; in Regensburg, Bavaria, Germany (d. 1976)
  - Michele Orecchia, Italian Olympic and professional road bicycle racer; in Marseille, Bouches-du-Rhône, France (d. 1981)
  - Yuli Raizman, Soviet Russian film director and screenwriter; in Moscow, Russian Empire (d. 1994)
  - Tamanishiki San'emon (born Nishinouchi Yasuki), Japanese sumo wrestler, 32nd yokozuna; in Kōchi, Japan (d. 1938 following appendectomy)

== December 16, 1903 (Wednesday) ==
- Australia held its 1903 federal election for seats in the House of Representatives and Senate, the first in which women had the right to stand for Parliament. Selina Anderson, Vida Goldstein, Nellie Martel and Mary Moore-Bentley became the first women in the British Empire to stand for a national parliament; none were successful.
- The Taj Mahal Hotel in Bombay (now Mumbai), India, opened its doors to guests.
- In North Carolina, the Wright brothers completed repairs of the Wright Flyer, readying it for another test.
- In Ellis County, Texas, four men pulled landowner Josh Reagor from his buggy and beat him to death. Reagor had recently made a $10,000 real estate deal, and the attack may have been a robbery attempt. Fred Morris and Will Birt would be convicted of complicity in the murder the following year, but the other two killers would never be identified.
- Born:
  - Hardie Albright (born Hardie Hunter Albrecht), American actor; in Charleroi, Pennsylvania (d. 1975, congestive heart failure)
  - Hans von Campenhausen, German-Baltic Protestant theologian; in Rosenbeck, Kingdom of Prussia (d. 1989)
  - Roberto Lucifero d'Aprigliano, Italian lawyer, antifascist partisan and politician; in Rome, Italy (d. 1993)
  - Misao Tamai, Japanese footballer; in Hyōgo Prefecture, Empire of Japan (d. 1978)
  - Harold Whitlock (born Hector Harold Whitlock), British motor mechanic and Olympic champion racewalker; in Hendon, Greater London, England (d. 1985)
- Died:
  - Thomas Finney, 66, Irish-born Australian businessman and politician
  - Clemente Marchisio, 70, Italian Roman Catholic priest

== December 17, 1903 (Thursday) ==
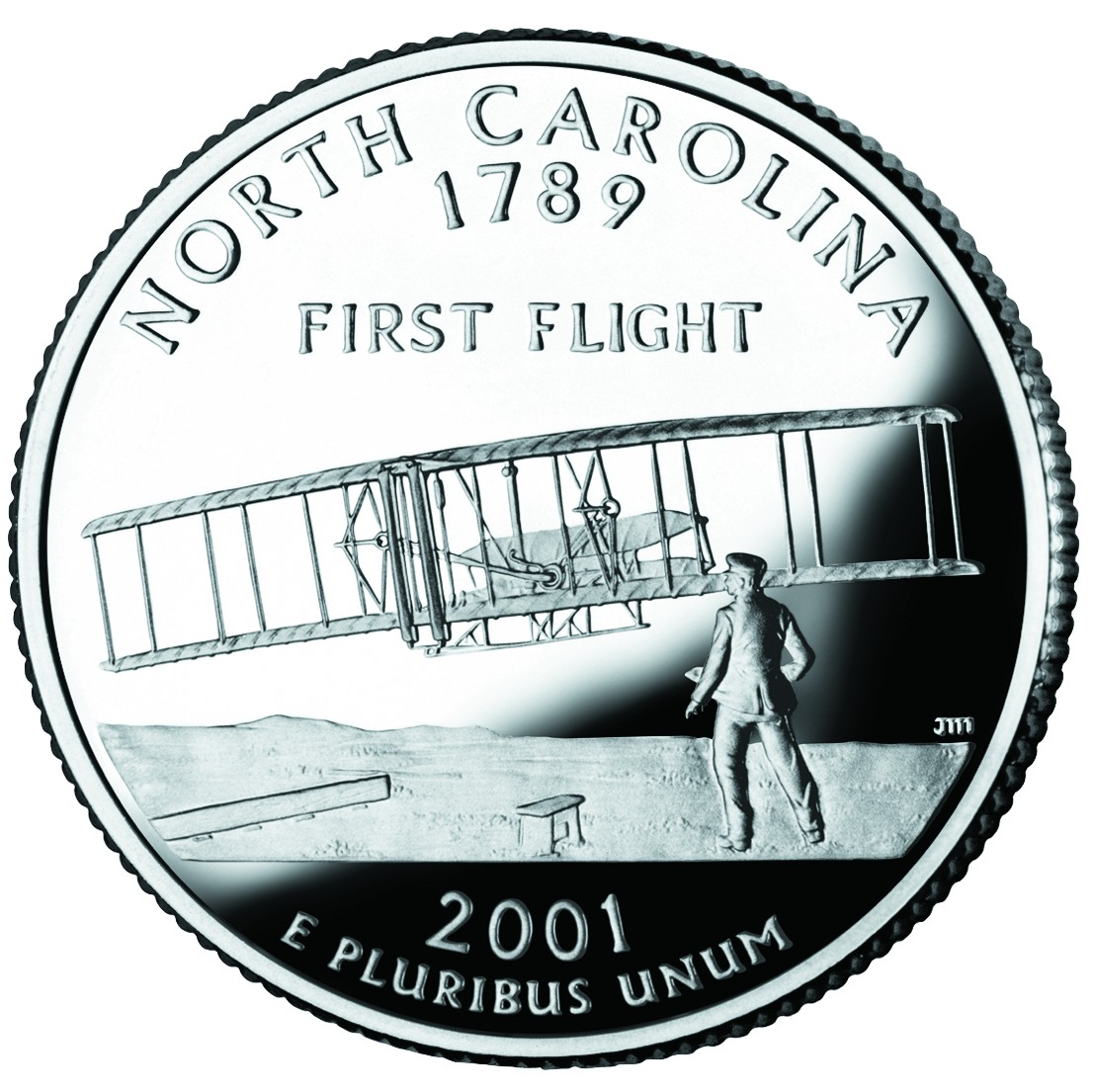
Reverse of 2001 North Carolina quarter

- Orville Wright flew an aircraft with a gasoline engine, the Wright Flyer, near Kitty Hawk, North Carolina, in the first documented and successful powered and controlled heavier-than-air flight, which lasted 12 seconds and covered a distance of 120 feet (37 m). The Wright brothers made three more flights, with Wilbur and Orville taking turns; the fourth flight, piloted by Wilbur, lasted 59 seconds and covered a distance of 852 feet (260 m). Before they could make a fifth flight, the aircraft was overturned by a gust of wind, destroying it.
- Born:
  - Erskine Caldwell, American author; in Coweta County, Georgia (d. 1987)
  - Ray Noble (born Stanley Raymond Noble), English jazz and big band musician; in Brighton, Sussex, England (d. 1978)
  - Roland de Vaux, French Dominican priest and archaeologist; in Paris, France (d. 1971)

== December 18, 1903 (Friday) ==
- Thirteen people died in a dormitory fire at Walden University in Nashville, Tennessee.
- In Sacramento, California, boxer Tom Pendergast sustained a concussion which caused a fatal brain hemorrhage in a fight with Frank "Kid Williams" Solomon. Solomon was arrested for manslaughter, but he and everyone else connected with the fight were released on December 21.
- Born:
  - Alexander Dubyago, Soviet astronomer; in Kazan, Russia (d. 1959)
  - Harry Forsyth, Irish cricketer; in Dublin, Ireland (d. 2004)

== December 19, 1903 (Saturday) ==
- The opera Siberia, composed by Umberto Giordano, received its world premiere at La Scala, Milan, Italy.

Film clip of Williamsburg Bridge opening procession

- New York City held a lavish dedication ceremony for the new Williamsburg Bridge across the East River. The bridge would open to pedestrians at 8 a.m. the following morning and to vehicular traffic at 5 a.m. on December 21.
- On the night of December 19–20, 21-year-old farm wife Kate Rodd Slifer died of chloroform poisoning in the bed she shared with her husband, William E. Slifer, also 21, at the farmhouse of Will's parents in Melrose Township, Grundy County, Iowa. Although Kate's death was initially thought to be a suicide, Will would subsequently be charged with her murder, but would be acquitted in September 1904.
- Born:
  - Pauline Curley, American vaudeville and silent film actress; in Holyoke, Massachusetts (d. 2000)
  - C. D. Darlington, English biologist, geneticist and eugenicist; in Chorley, Lancashire, England (d. 1981)
  - Theo Harych, German writer; in Doruchow, Province of Posen, German Empire (d. 1958, suicide)
  - François Perroux, French economist; in Saint-Romain-en-Gal, France (d. 1987)
  - George Davis Snell, American geneticist, recipient of the Nobel Prize in Physiology or Medicine; in Bradford, Massachusetts (d. 1996)
- Died: Robert Jarvis Cochran Walker, 65, United States Representative from Pennsylvania

== December 20, 1903 (Sunday) ==
- Trinity Episcopal Church in Santa Barbara, California, valued at $25,000, was totally destroyed by fire. The loss was almost completely covered by insurance.
- Born:
  - Georges Antenen, Swiss Olympic cyclist; in La Chaux-de-Fonds, Switzerland (d. 1979)
  - Josef Dostál, Czech botanist, pteridologist and mountaineer; in Prague, Austria-Hungary (d. 1999)
  - Adelbert Schulz, German Panzertruppe World War II general; in Berlin, Germany (d. 1944, killed in action)
  - Domingo Tarasconi, Argentine Olympic and professional footballer; in Buenos Aires, Argentina (d. 1991)
- Died:
  - Kornél Ábrányi, 81, Hungarian pianist and composer
  - Frederic René Coudert Sr., 71, American lawyer

== December 21, 1903 (Monday) ==
- Spanish newspapers reported the possible engagement of 17-year-old King Alfonso XIII to his 12-year-old cousin, Princess Pilar of Bavaria. Alfonso would marry Victoria Eugenie of Battenberg on May 31, 1906 (see Morral affair). Princess Pilar never married. She co-wrote a 1932 biography of Alfonso, Every Inch a King.
- Eight people were killed and over 30 injured in the predawn wreck of the Meteor, a passenger train, on the St. Louis–San Francisco Railway at Godfrey, Kansas.
- Two members of the New York City Fire Department — Battalion Chief Martin M. Coleman, a recipient of the James Gordon Bennett Medal for bravery, and Firefighter Richard J. Joyce — were killed fighting a fire which destroyed two factory buildings on Mott Street in Manhattan.
- An explosion destroyed the St. Louis Transit company's power station at Jefferson and Geyer Avenues, killing five workers.
- Born:
  - Robert E. Cornish, American biologist and writer; in San Francisco, California (d. 1963)
  - Elinor Fair (born Eleanore Virginia Crowe), American film actress; in Richmond, Virginia (d. 1957, cirrhosis of the liver)
  - Lucas Cornelius Steyn, Chief Justice of South Africa; in Geluksdam, Viljoenskroon district, Orange River Colony (d. 1976)
  - Lawrence Treat (pseudonym for Lawrence Arthur Goldstone), American mystery writer; in New York City (d. 1998)
- Died: Gavriil Musicescu, 56, Romanian composer, conductor and musicologist

== December 22, 1903 (Tuesday) ==
- The cargo ship Clarence S. Bement, on her way from Philadelphia to San Francisco under the command of Captain G. G. Grant with a cargo of Baltimore coal, caught fire in a storm about 80 miles (130 km) north of Cape St. John in the Falkland Islands. The 25 crewmembers safely reached Fox Island in their lifeboats and were subsequently taken to Port Stanley by mail schooner.
- In Vermont, Mary Rogers was convicted of first-degree murder and sentenced to death for the August 12, 1902, death of her husband, Marcus H. Rogers. She would be hanged on December 8, 1905.
- 42 American soldiers who had died in the Philippine–American War were buried with honors at Arlington National Cemetery.
- In Lincoln, Nebraska, Clayton S. Deeter, an escaped inmate from the Grand Island soldiers' home, entered Governor John H. Mickey's office and threatened him with a paper knife, demanding that he agree that Senator Charles Henry Dietrich was innocent of the bribery charges against him. Mickey reassured Deeter that he agreed with him until Nebraska State Capitol employees entered and overpowered Deeter.
- Near Red Bluff, California, Sheriff J. W. Boyd of Tehama County, California and Marshal Ward of Red Bluff captured Anderson Garred, who had shot and killed former Oregon county sheriff Andrew J. McKinnon in Guerneville, California, on September 8. On May 13, 1904, a jury would pronounce Garred insane.
- Born:
  - Haldan Keffer Hartline, American physiologist, recipient of the Nobel Prize in Physiology or Medicine; in Bloomsburg, Pennsylvania (d. 1983)
  - Rodolfo Ostromann, Austrian footballer; in Pula, Austria-Hungary (d. 1960)
  - Odhise Paskali, Albanian sculptor; in Kozani, Greece (d. 1985)
  - Joanídia Sodré, Brazilian musician and composer; in Porto Alegre, Brazil (d. 1975)
- Died: John G. Campbell, 76, Scottish-born American businessman and politician, delegate to the United States House of Representatives from Arizona Territory

== December 23, 1903 (Wednesday) ==
- On the Baltimore and Ohio Railroad near Connellsville, Pennsylvania, the Duquesne Limited, a passenger train, derailed when it struck a load of timber lying on the tracks. The timber had fallen from a freight train minutes before the collision. The crash resulted in 64 deaths and about 60 injuries. There was widespread theft of valuables from the victims' bodies.
- Born:
  - Armand Blanchonnet, French Olympic champion cyclist; in Gipcy, Allier, France (d. 1968)
  - Bolesław Kominek, Polish Roman Catholic cardinal; in Radlin II, Wodzisław Śląski, German Empire (d. 1974)
  - Nevio Skull, Fiuman Italian businessman and politician; in Fiume, Hungary (d. 1945, murdered)
  - Fredi Washington (born Fredericka Carolyn Washington), American stage and film actress and civil rights activist; in Savannah, Georgia (d. 1994, pneumonia following stroke)
- Died:
  - Pope Barrow, 64, United States Senator from Georgia
  - Henrietta Duterte (born Henrietta Smith Bowers), 86, American philanthropist and abolitionist, first American female undertaker
  - James Hadley, 66, English potter
  - Princess Leopoldine of Baden, 66
  - Sophus Ruge, 72, German geographer and historian

== December 24, 1903 (Thursday) ==
- Shortly after 8 p.m., a double-decker car and a combination car collided on the tram line in Kingsland, New Zealand, due to brake failure, resulting in three deaths and as many as 60 injuries.
- In response to a telegram informing him that novelist George Gissing was dying, fellow novelist H. G. Wells set out for Saint-Jean-Pied-de-Port, France, where he would help nurse Gissing in his final illness.

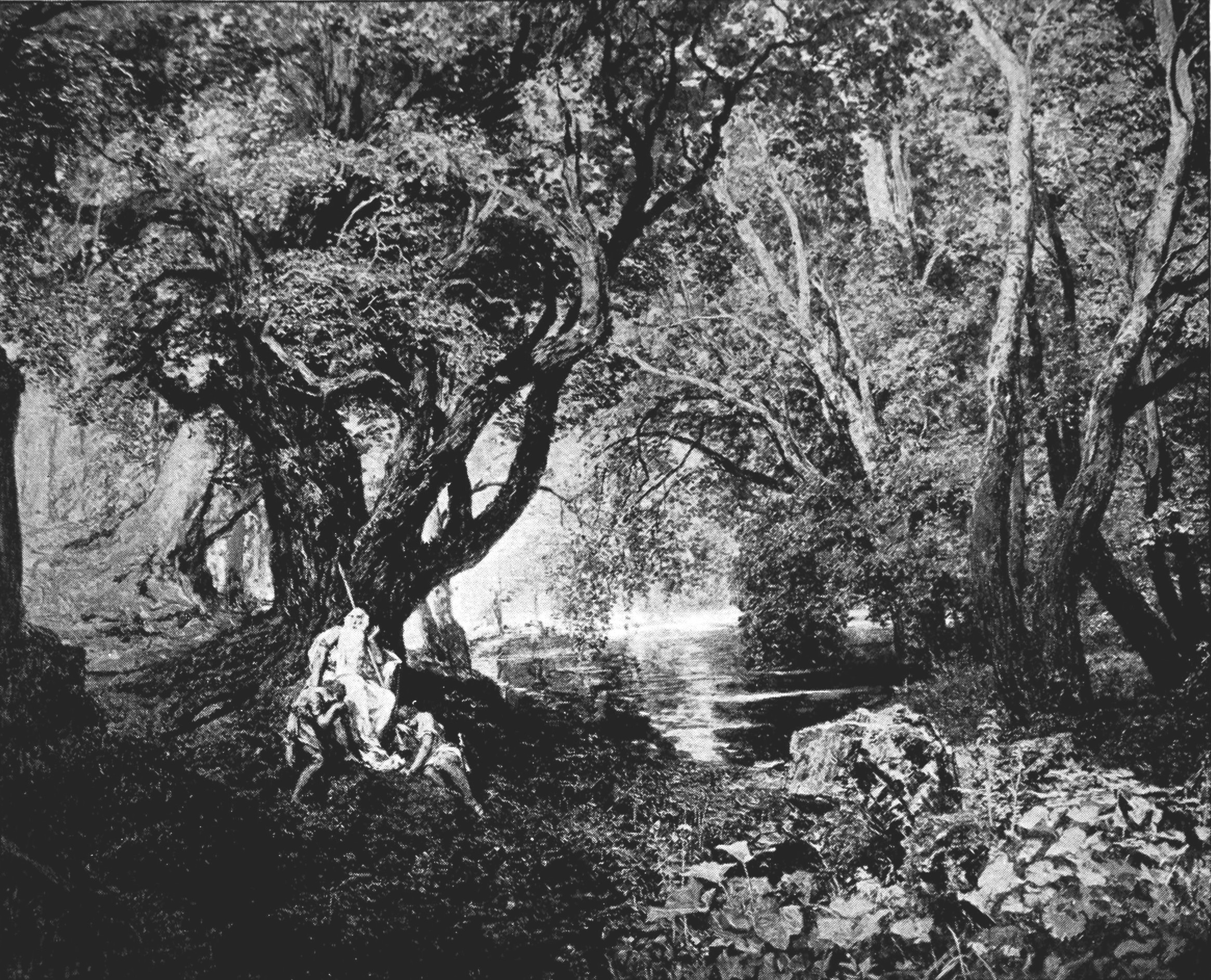
Scene design for Act I, Scene 1 in Parsifal (1903 Metropolitan Opera production)

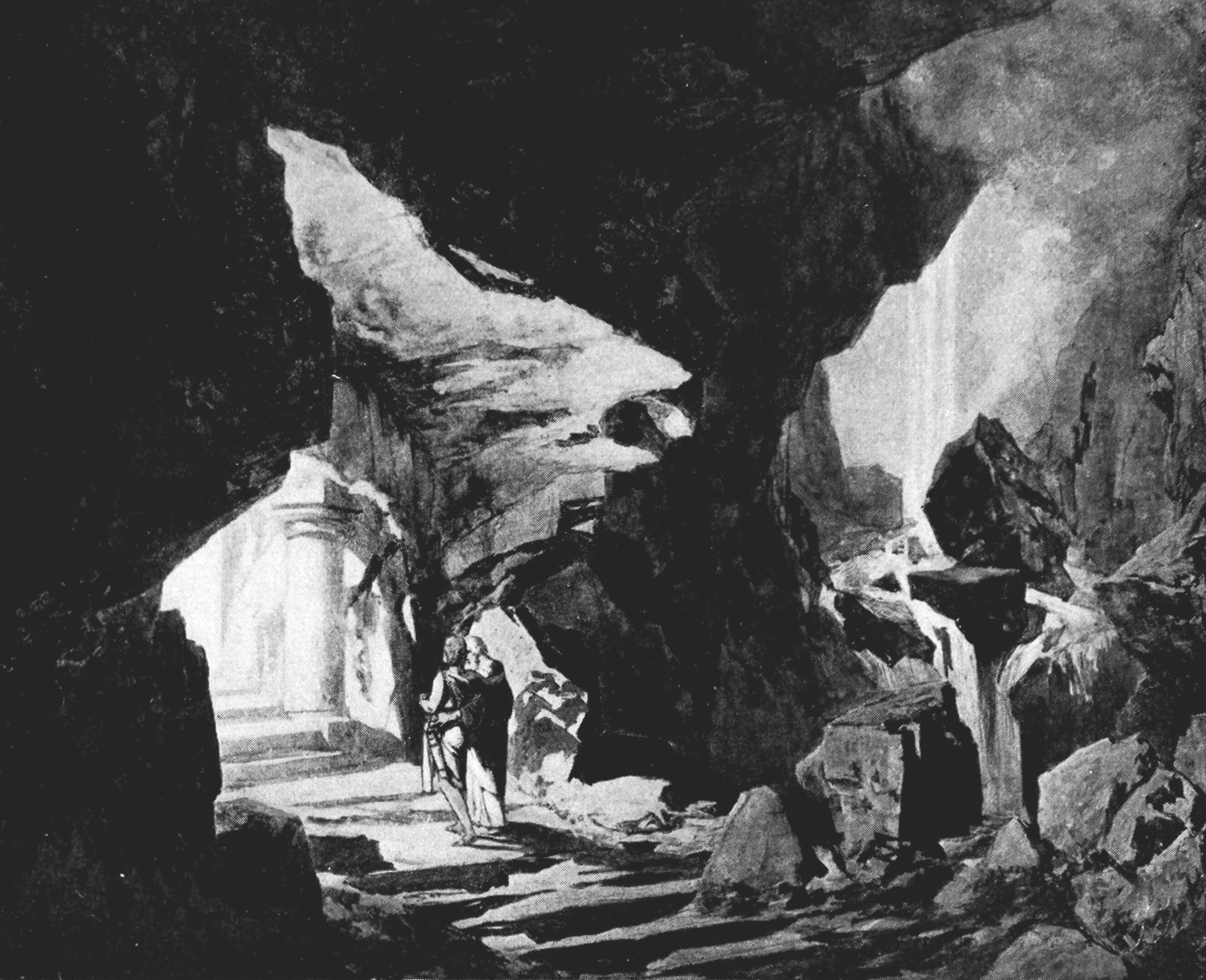
Scene design for Act I Transformation Scene in Parsifal (1903 Metropolitan Opera production)

- Parsifal, the final opera by composer Richard Wagner, which since its premiere in 1882 had been performed on stage only at the Bayreuth Festival, received its first staged performance in another venue at the Metropolitan Opera House in New York City. The production was intensely controversial but went ahead despite legal action by the Wagner family to prevent it.
- American comic actor Jerome Sykes, in Chicago starring in the play The Billionaires, hosted a Christmas Eve dinner for members of the Billionaires company. Sykes took part in an amateur theatrical performance during the dinner but was not dressed warmly enough for the occasion. He would die of pneumonia on December 29.
- Born:
  - Momtazuddin Ahmed, Bangladeshi philosopher and educationist; in Brahmanbaria, Bengal Presidency (d. 1971)
  - Joseph Cornell, American sculptor; in Nyack, New York (d. 1972, heart failure)
  - Ava Helen Pauling (born Ava Helen Miller), American human rights activist; in Beavercreek, Oregon (d. 1981, stomach cancer)
  - Jack Purcell, Canadian badminton player; in Guelph, Ontario, Canada (d. 1991)
- Died: Moody Merrill, 67, American politician and businessman, died of pneumonia with complications in Silver City, New Mexico, while embezzlement charges were pending against him in Massachusetts.

== December 25, 1903 (Friday) ==
- Alexander Graham Bell and his wife, Mabel Gardiner Hubbard, arrived in Genoa, Italy, for the purpose of bringing the remains of James Smithson, benefactor of the Smithsonian Institution, to the United States.
- A severe winter storm struck New York City, where winds of up to 60 miles per hour (97 km/h) blew down and injured pedestrians. However, only about 0.5 inches (13 mm) of snow fell on the city.
- In San Francisco, California, cook William H. Atkins murdered prizefighter Charles "Muldoon" McDonald.
- Born: Lelio Basso, Italian politician and journalist; in Varazze, Italy (d. 1978)
- Died: Christian Johansson, 86, Russian dancer, choreographer and ballet master

== December 26, 1903 (Saturday) ==
- Two days after the shooting of C. P. "Pig" Melton, a prominent white citizen of Pine Apple, Alabama, over a game of craps, an African American man, Arthur Stewart, was arrested on Christmas Day as an accessory to the crime. At about 4 a.m. on December 26, a lynch mob broke into the Pine Apple jail, knocked Stewart unconscious, poured kerosene on him and burned him alive. They then apparently set fire to the jail to destroy evidence, but the fire spread and destroyed 11 other buildings, causing $35,000 in damage. At a mass meeting on the evening of December 26, the citizens of Pine Apple requested a special term of court to try the members of the lynch mob.

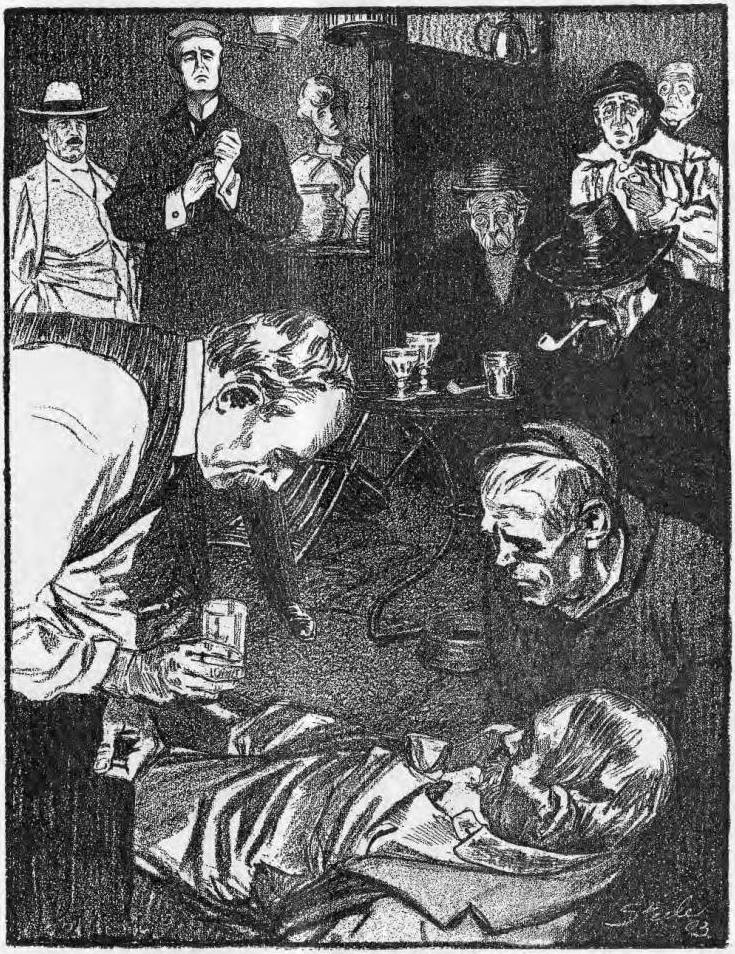
Sherlock Holmes demonstrates his boxing skills in "The Adventure of the Solitary Cyclist"

- The Sherlock Holmes short story "The Adventure of the Solitary Cyclist" by Sir Arthur Conan Doyle was published for the first time in Collier's in the United States.
- On the day after Christmas, Los Angeles City Hall was closed for employees to have an extra holiday. Presumably as a practical joke, someone placed a sign on the front entrance reading, "CLOSED ON ACCOUNT OF DEATH OF THE MAYOR". Meredith P. Snyder, the Mayor of Los Angeles, received many telephone calls during the morning asking if he was dead. After the sign was removed, it was replaced with one reading, "Closed. All gone to the races."
- Severe winter weather struck New England, causing three shipwrecks, one of which, that of a dredger which sank less than 6 miles (9.7 km) from Boston, killed 3 men. All crewmembers were rescued from the wrecks of SS Kiowa, which sank off Boston Light after being accidentally rammed by the United Fruit Company freighter Admiral Dewey, and the barge John W. Mackay, wrecked off Watch Hill, Rhode Island. About 8 inches (200 mm) of snow fell on Boston.
- In two major fires in Manhattan, New York City, the West Side Lyceum at Seventh Avenue and 52nd Street sustained $60,000 in damage, while 3 apartment houses on Columbus Avenue near 68th Street sustained $15,000 in damage.
- British mountaineer Alexander Goodall fell to his death after glissading down part of Deep Ghyll, a chasm in the Scawfell Crags on the west side of Scawfell Pinnacle in the Lake District of England. His climbing partner, F. Botterill, descended Deep Ghyll alone, initially without an ice axe until he recovered the one Goodall had been using from the spot where he had fallen.
- Edith Roosevelt, the First Lady of the United States, hosted a Christmas party at the White House for 500 children. President Roosevelt attended the musical part of the entertainment.

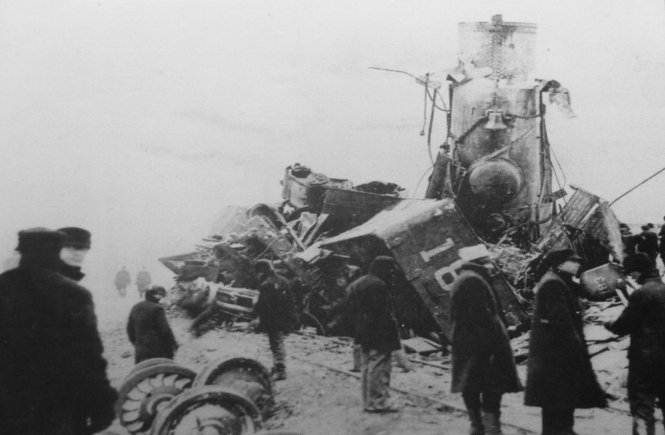
Aftermath of the East Paris train wreck

- The East Paris train wreck, a head-on collision of passenger trains on the Pere Marquette Railway, 6 miles (9.7 km) east of Grand Rapids, Michigan, killed 21 people and seriously injured 38. Railroad officials reported that the crash was caused by high winds blowing out a red signal lamp.
- Born:
  - Herbert Albert, German conductor; in Bad Lausick, Germany (d. 1973)
  - Richard Austin, British conductor and professor; in Birkenhead, Cheshire, England (d. 1989)
  - Elisha Cook Jr., American actor; in San Francisco, California (d. 1995, stroke)
  - Felice Gasperi, Italian Olympic footballer; in Bologna, Province of Bologna, Italy (d. 1982)
  - Heinz Reinefarth, German SS commander and West German government official; in Gnesen, Province of Posen, Prussia, German Empire (d. 1979)
  - Fuzzy Vandivier (born Robert P. Vandivier), American high school and college basketball player; in Franklin, Indiana (d. 1983)
- Died:
  - Sir Harry Bullard JP DL, 62, English brewer and Member of Parliament
  - Giuseppe Zanardelli, 77, Italian politician and Prime Minister

== December 27, 1903 (Sunday) ==
- Italian composer Giacomo Puccini completed the original version of his opera Madama Butterfly, which would receive its world premiere on February 17, 1904, at La Scala, Milan.
- Born:
  - Hans Ekstrand, German politician; in Hamburg, Germany (d. 1969)
  - Caecilia Loots, Dutch teacher and resistance member, Righteous Among the Nations; in Haarlem, Netherlands (d. 1988)
  - William Aloysius O'Connor, American Roman Catholic prelate; in Chicago, Illinois (d. 1983, heart seizure)
  - Bogdan Suchodolski, Polish philosopher and teacher (d. 1992)
  - Hermann Volk, German Roman Catholic cardinal; in Steinheim, Westphalia, German Empire (d. 1988)
- Died:
  - Adolf Čech, 62, Czech conductor
  - Lydia Hoyt Farmer, 61, American author and women's rights activist

== December 28, 1903 (Monday) ==
- U.S. President Theodore Roosevelt issued a proclamation directing that the federal Department of Commerce and Labor take over responsibility for the lighthouse service in the Territory of Hawaii beginning on January 1, 1904. The following day, Roosevelt would issue an executive order directing the same department to take over responsibility for the lighthouse and buoys at Guantanamo Bay Naval Base in Cuba.
- The First Physical Culture Exhibition, the first large-scale bodybuilding competition in America, began at Madison Square Garden in New York City. It would conclude on January 2, 1904.
- Born:
  - Earl Hines, American jazz pianist; in Duquesne, Pennsylvania (d. 1983, heart attack)
  - Mikhail Kalatozov, Soviet film director; in Tiflis, Russian Empire (d. 1973)
  - John von Neumann (born Neumann János Lajos), Hungarian-born mathematician; in Budapest, Kingdom of Hungary (d. 1957, cancer)
  - Adam Smith, American Olympic swimmer; in Bradford, Pennsylvania (d. 1985)
- Died:
  - America Waldo Bogle, 59, Oregon Territory pioneer
  - Nikolai Fyodorovich Fyodorov, 74, Russian Eastern Orthodox philosopher
  - George Gissing, 46, English novelist, died of pneumonia.
  - Margaret Frances Sullivan (born Margaret Frances Buchanan), 55–56, Irish-born American author, journalist and editor, died of a stroke.

== December 29, 1903 (Tuesday) ==
- Czech composer Antonín Dvořák attended the funeral of conductor and fellow countryman Adolf Čech. Dvořák himself would die on May 1, 1904.
- In a note to José A. Terry, Minister Plenipotentiary of the Argentine Republic, British minister William Haggard ratified William Speirs Bruce's proposal to sell the Antarctic meteorological station which would become Orcadas Base to the Argentine Oficina Meteorológica Naval Argentina (Argentine Naval Office of Meteorology).
- Born:
  - Erhard Mauersberger, German choral conductor; in Mauersberg, Großrückerswalde, Saxony, Germany (d. 1982)
  - Clyde McCoy, American jazz trumpeter; in Ashland, Kentucky (d. 1990, Alzheimer's disease)
- Died:
  - Jerome Sykes, 35, American actor, died of pneumonia.
  - Frances Emily White, 71, American anatomist and physiologist, died of uterine cancer.

== December 30, 1903 (Wednesday) ==
- In Troy, New York, a fire partially destroyed the Troy club, killing club residents Moses T. Clough and William Shaw and club guest Benjamin W. Kinney of Boston, Massachusetts.
- A fire at the Iroquois Theatre in Chicago, Illinois, killed 602 people, the greatest death toll of any theater fire in the history of the United States. Most of the victims were women and children attending a matinee performance of the musical Mr. Blue Beard, starring Eddie Foy Sr. According to fire survivor Frank Slosson, "The screams of the children for their mothers and mothers for their children I shall carry in my memory to my dying day."
- Due to the death of actor Jerome Sykes the previous day, the production of The Billionaires in which he was starring at the Illinois Theatre was canceled. Two victims of the Iroquois fire were members of the Billionaires cast who attended the Mr. Blue Beard performance: Harry Hudson (stage name of Clarence Burr Scott), 21, and Arthur Caville, 24. Will J. Davis, the manager of both the Iroquois and Illinois Theatres, was at Sykes' funeral when he received a telephone call informing him of the Iroquois fire.
- An executive session of leaders of the ongoing liveryman's strike in Chicago determined to permit burial of the dead from the Iroquois fire without obstruction.
- The body of famed American journalist Margaret Frances Sullivan, who had died on December 28, was taken to Detroit, Michigan, for burial. The news of the Iroquois fire overshadowed that of Sullivan's death, denying her the published tributes she might otherwise have received.
- Born: Candido Portinari, Brazilian painter; in Brodowski, São Paulo, Brazil (d. 1962, lead poisoning from paints)
- Died:
  - George Deshon, 80, American Catholic priest, co-founder of the Paulist Fathers, died of heart failure.
  - Dan Leahy, 33, American Major League Baseball shortstop, was shot to death.
  - Armand Séguin, 34, French painter (may have died December 28 or 29)
  - John Browne, 4th Marquess of Sligo, 79, Irish politician and naval commander

== December 31, 1903 (Thursday) ==
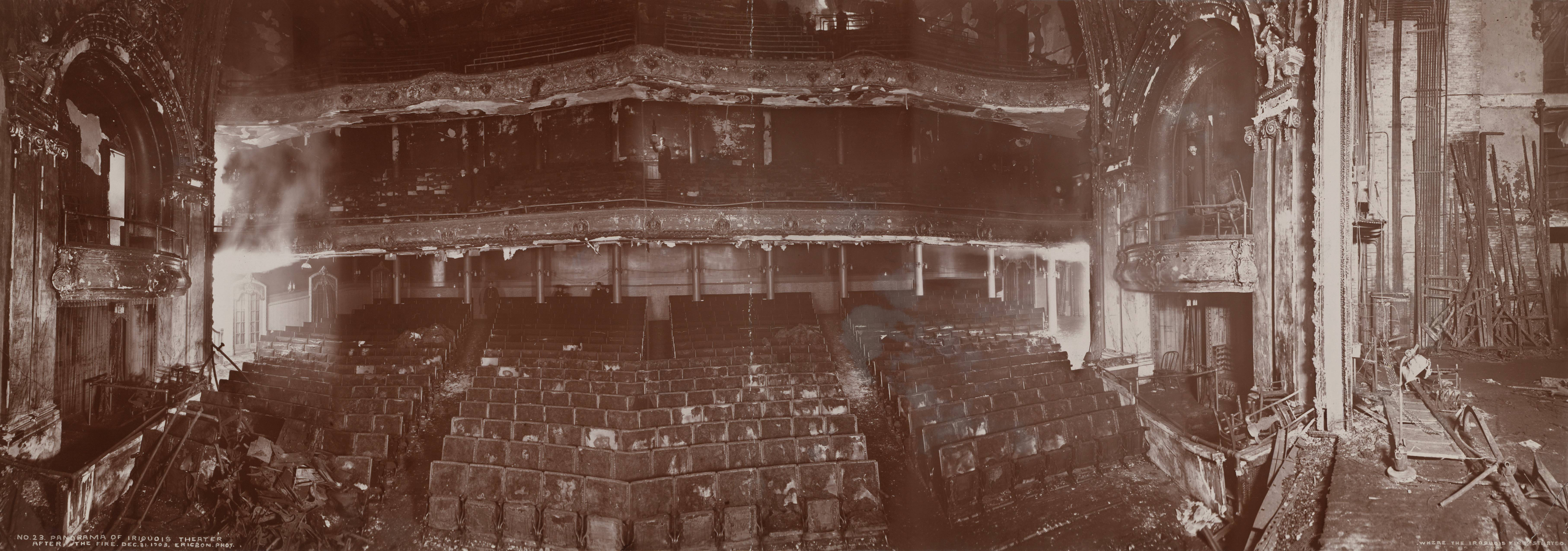
Panorama of the Iroquois Theatre the day after the fire

- In Sweden, the National Association for Women's Suffrage was founded.
- The Fisk Jubilee Singers arrived in San Francisco, where they were unable to find accommodation at any hotel or boarding house due to racial discrimination. E. T. Cottman of the Afro-Methodist Episcopal Church gave them shelter in his home, but they were unable to get board near Cottman's house and needed to travel from Sacramento Street to Market Street for every meal. At their concert at the Young Men's Christian Association on the night of January 1, Mrs. Maggie Porter Cole, the Singers' musical director, would explain these events to the audience in apology for the group's colds and fatigue.
- Carter Harrison IV, the Mayor of Chicago, issued a proclamation suggesting that New Year's Eve celebrations in the city not take place due to the Iroquois fire. Harrison's advice was widely followed, and Chicago was unprecedentedly silent on the last night of the year.
- Born: Fumiko Hayashi, Japanese author; in Moji-ku, Kitakyūshū, Japan (d. 1951, myocardial infarction)
- Died: Joe McGuckin, 41, American Major League Baseball outfielder
