= November 1903 =

Month of 1903

| << | November 1903 | | | | | >> |
| Su | Mo | Tu | We | Th | Fr | Sa |
| 1 | 2 | 3 | 4 | 5 | 6 | 7 |
| 8 | 9 | 10 | 11 | 12 | 13 | 14 |
| 15 | 16 | 17 | 18 | 19 | 20 | 21 |
| 22 | 23 | 24 | 25 | 26 | 27 | 28 |
| 29 | 30 |

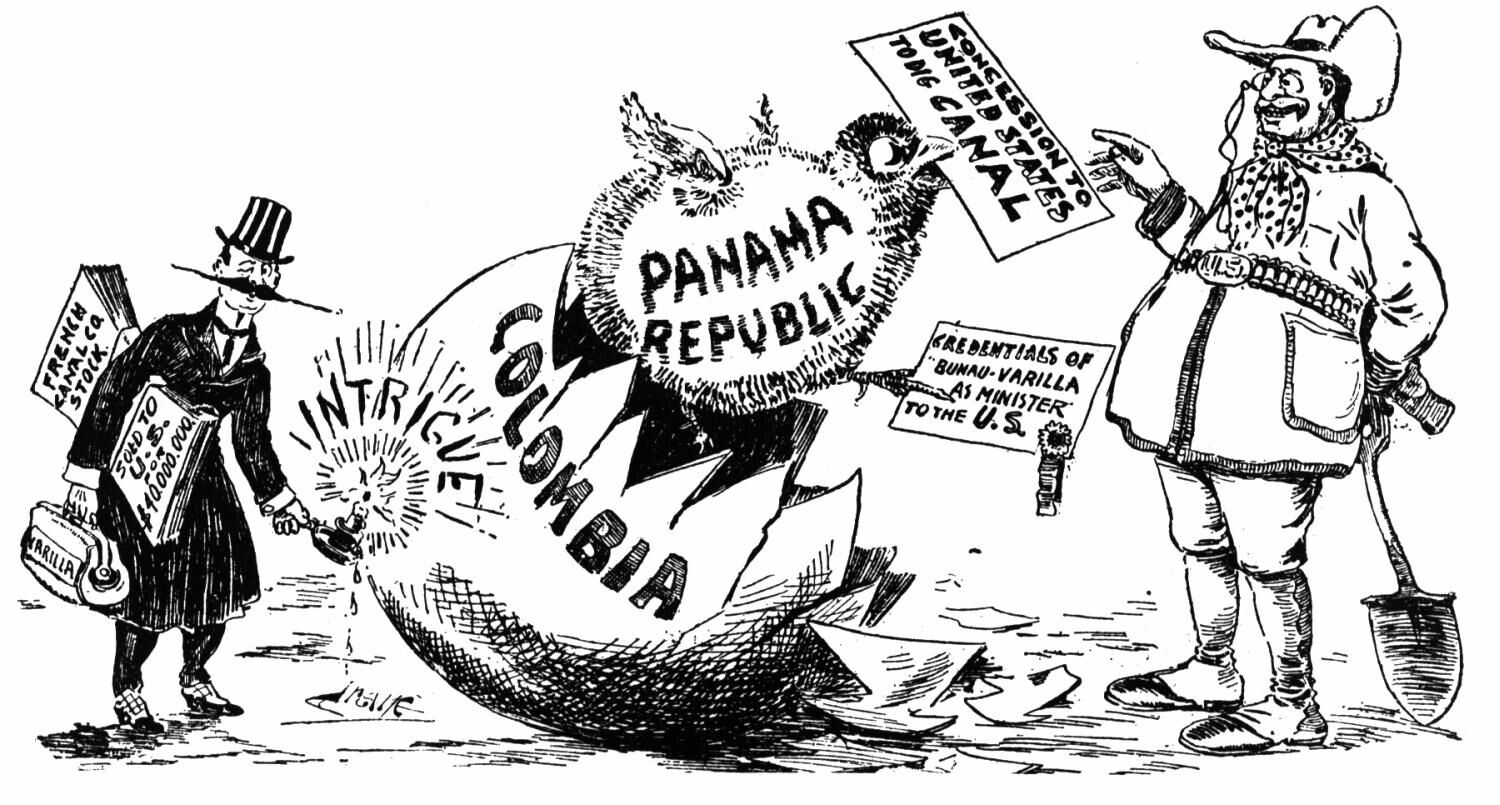
1903 political cartoon commenting on the Hay–Bunau-Varilla Treaty, which established the Panama Canal Zone

The following events occurred in November 1903:

== November 1, 1903 (Sunday) ==
- William Melville retired as the superintendent of the Special Branch of Scotland Yard. He would secretly become the head of the new MO3 intelligence section in the War Office.
- The steamship Discovery departed from Yakutat, Alaska with about 30 people on board and disappeared. The following year, Chief John of the Lituya Bay Native Tribe would report having seen Discovery sink on the afternoon of November 2 after a failed attempt to enter Lituya Bay.
- Born:
  - Max Adrian (born Guy Thornton Bor), Northern Irish actor; in Kilkenny, County Kilkenny, Ireland (d. 1973)
  - Carji Greeves (born Edward Goderich Greeves, Junior), Australian rules footballer; in Warragul, Victoria, Australia (d. 1963)
  - Don Robey, American songwriter and record producer; in Houston, Texas (d. 1975)
  - Jean Tardieu, French artist, musician and author; in Saint-Germain-de-Joux, Ain, France (d. 1995)
  - Mario Zampi, Italian film producer and director (d. 1963)
- Died: Theodor Mommsen, 85, German writer and politician, recipient of the Nobel Prize in Literature

== November 2, 1903 (Monday) ==
- Alfred Harmsworth, publisher of the British Daily Mail newspaper, launched the Daily Mirror, initially as a women's newspaper run by women.
- A conflagration destroyed about 150 houses in Jérémie, Haiti.
- The Lyceum Theatre opened in the Theater District, Manhattan, with American actor E. H. Sothern starring in The Proud Prince.
- In Richmond, Virginia, Maggie L. Walker became the first African-American woman to charter a bank.
- In the 1903 Ohio gubernatorial election, Republican Myron T. Herrick defeated the Democratic Mayor of Cleveland, Tom L. Johnson, for the position of Governor of Ohio.
- The collapse of a railroad bridge under demolition over the Brazos River in Brenham, Texas, killed one man and injured four others.
- Born:
  - Travis Jackson, American Major League Baseball shortstop; in Waldo, Arkansas (d. 1987)
  - Edgard Potier, Belgian spy; in Seraing, Liège Province, Belgium (d. 1944, suicide after torture)
- Died: Vsevolod Solovyov, 54, Russian historical novelist

== November 3, 1903 (Tuesday) ==
- Count István Tisza took office as Prime Minister of the Kingdom of Hungary.
- Giovanni Giolitti became Prime Minister of Italy for the second time, and his new Cabinet was sworn into office.
- During an American football game in Long Branch, New Jersey, 18-year-old Raymond McVeigh, a player on the Cadillac team, sustained a head injury that did not appear to be serious. Several days later he was found unconscious at his home in Brooklyn and subsequently died.
- Six U.S. states voted to elect governors: Iowa, Kentucky, Maryland, Massachusetts, Mississippi and Rhode Island.
- With the encouragement of the United States, Panama proclaimed itself independent of Colombia.
- Born:
  - Walker Evans, American photographer and photojournalist; in St. Louis, Missouri (d. 1975)
  - Charles Rigoulot, French Olympic champion weightlifter; in Le Vésinet, Yvelines, France (d. 1962)
  - Shizue Tatsuta (born Shizue Shiono), Japanese silent film actress; in Yamagata Prefecture, Japan (d. 1962)
- Died:
  - Jean-Baptiste Brondel, 61, Belgian-born Catholic prelate
  - Benjamin T. Frederick, 69, member of the United States House of Representatives from Iowa

== November 4, 1903 (Wednesday) ==
- American showman and kite expert Samuel Franklin Cody made a second failed attempt to cross the English Channel from Dover to Calais in a collapsible boat pulled by a kite, having tried before on October 10.
- Agram Grigorian and Sigran Szmician, delegates to the Armenian convention in London, England, were shot from behind and killed near the Armenian headquarters at Peckham Rye. The assassin shot at a third delegate, Reuben Glaberiain, but missed; seeing that he would be unable to escape, he shot himself to death. The murderer was believed to be the same person who had assassinated Sagatel Sagouni, president of the Armenian Revolutionary Society, in Nunhead, London, on October 26.

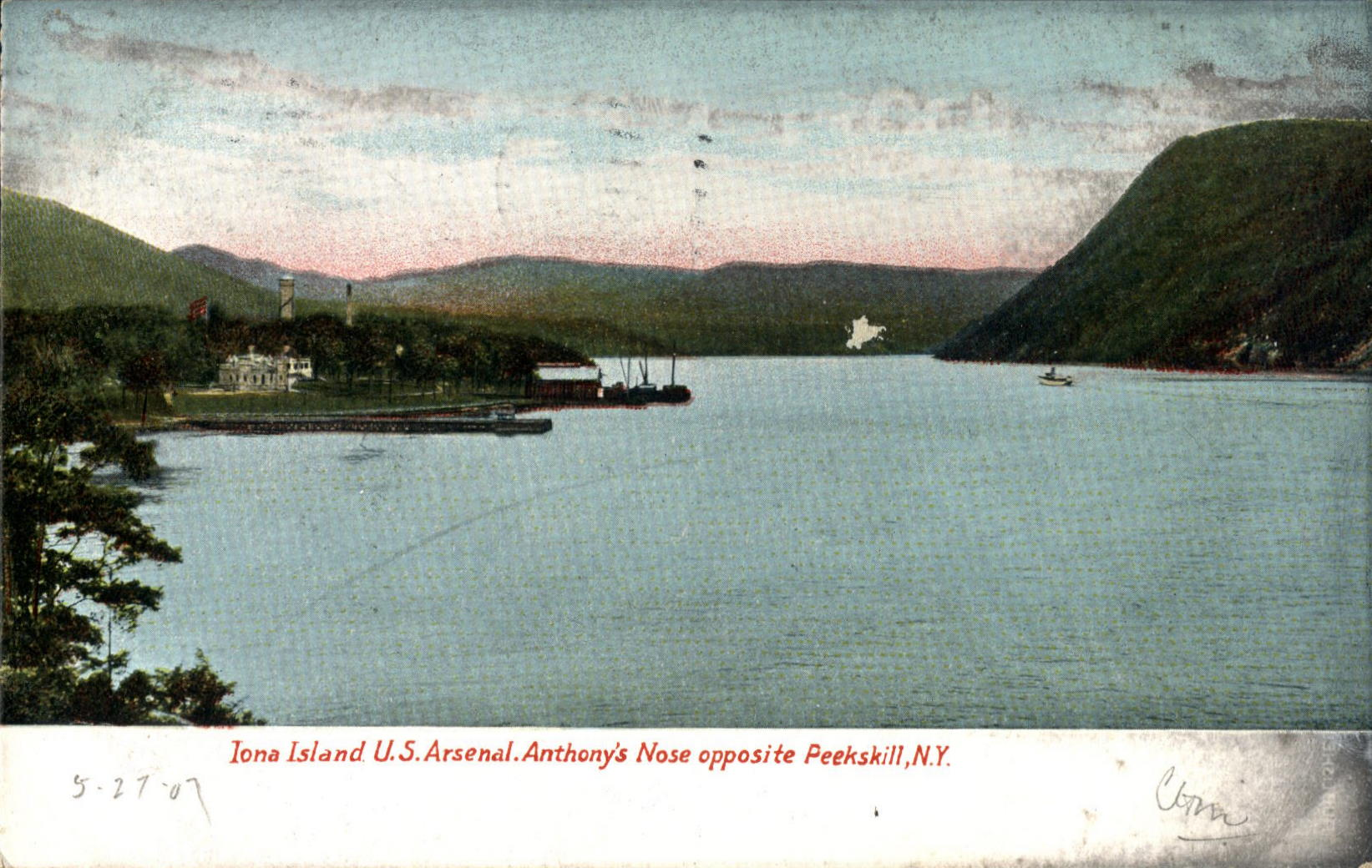
1907 postcard of the Iona Island naval facility

- An explosion at the United States Navy ammunition depot on Iona Island, New York, killed six workers and blew out windows in Peekskill.
- American boxer James J. Jeffries declined an offer to fight boxer Sam McVey for a $20,000 purse, saying, "I have made up my mind never to fight a negro again as long as there are white men in the field."
- All but three buildings in the business district of Granite Falls, North Carolina, were destroyed by a fire that started in the Field and Smith Warehouse. The townspeople fought the fire with buckets of water.
- One passenger was killed and 51 injured, some seriously, in a cable car collision in Kansas City, Missouri.
- Born:
  - Boris Arbuzov, Russian and Soviet chemist and politician (d. 1991)
  - Robert Emerson, American scientist; in New York City, New York (d. 1959 in crash of American Airlines Flight 320)
  - Watchman Nee (born Nee Shu-tsu [Chinese name]/Henry Nee [English name]), Chinese Christian preacher, church leader; in Shantou, Guangdong, Manchu China (d. 1972 in prison)
  - Henry Milton Taylor, fourth Governor-General of the Bahamas (d. 1994)
- Died: Heinrich Brück, 72, German Catholic church historian and bishop

== November 5, 1903 (Thursday) ==
- In Dourdan, France, Arthur Duray set a new automobile land speed record of 84.732 mph (136.363 km/h) in a Gobron-Brillié automobile, surpassing his own previous record set on July 17.
- Near Kitty Hawk, North Carolina, the Wright brothers tested the engine of the Wright Flyer. The test damaged the engine's propeller shafts, which the Wrights sent back to Dayton, Ohio to be repaired by Charlie Dayton, their machinist.
- Hanover College football player Frank Shanklin died at an Indianapolis hospital of injuries he sustained five weeks earlier during a practice game at Hanover Field.
- Born:
  - H. Warner Munn, American fantasy and horror fiction writer and poet; in Athol, Massachusetts (d. 1981)
  - Guillermo Saavedra, Chilean Olympic and professional footballer; in Rancagua, Chile (d. 1957)

== November 6, 1903 (Friday) ==
- The English-language South China Morning Post newspaper was first published in Hong Kong.
- U.S. President Theodore Roosevelt extended de facto recognition to the new government of Panama.
- In Franklin, Pennsylvania, local athlete and football player Willis M. Kingsley was declared the winner of a three-round fight with Clarence C. Doolittle. Kingsley subsequently died due to a ruptured blood vessel. Authorities arrested Doolittle for murder the following day on the theory that Doolittle had punched Kingsley behind the ear after shaking his hand at the end of the fight, causing his death.
- Eight miners, including Superintendent R. B. Turner, died in a fire at the Kearsarge mine near Virginia City, Montana.
- Born:
  - Seymour Lipton, American abstract expressionist sculptor; in New York City, New York (d. 1986)
  - June Marlowe (born Gisela Valaria Goetten), American film actress; in St. Cloud, Minnesota (d. 1984)
  - Carl Rakosi, German-born American poet; in Berlin, Germany (d. 2004)
- Died: Giovanni de Ciotta, 79, Hungarian politician

== November 7, 1903 (Saturday) ==
- Samuel Franklin Cody successfully crossed the English Channel in his kite-boat, this time sailing from Calais to Dover.
- Sir James Ritchie took office as Lord Mayor of London.
- American wrestler Tom Jenkins, the wrestling champion of the world, retained his title in a match with Tom Sharkey at Carnival Stadium in Jacksonville, Florida.
- A major fire at Shaw's Garden in St. Louis, Missouri, caused $1000 in damage to buildings and $2,500 in damage to plants, with a great loss of species and varieties.
- The Grange Store and Opera House in Olathe, Kansas, was destroyed by a fire that broke out while 700 people were watching a play in the auditorium. No civilians were seriously injured, but several firefighters were badly burned.
- At the county stock fair in Pomeroy, Washington, Tom Andress, assistant to aeronaut Roy Williams, fell 50 feet (15 m) from Williams' balloon after becoming tangled in its ropes as it took off. Andress broke both arms at the wrist.
- In Sacramento, California, American baseball player George Hildebrand and his wife were rushed to the hospital after being rendered unconscious by a bathroom heater that failed to ignite and filled the room with gas.
- Born:
  - Ary Barroso, Brazilian composer and pianist; in Ubá, Minas Gerais, Brazil (d. 1964)
  - Dean Jagger, American actor; in Columbus Grove or Lima, Ohio (d. 1991)
  - Konrad Lorenz, Austrian zoologist, recipient of the Nobel Prize in Physiology or Medicine; in Vienna, Austria-Hungary (d. 1989)
- Died:
  - William Lukens Elkins, 71, American businessman and art collector, died of blood poisoning.
  - Frank Russell, 35, American anthropologist and ethnologist, died of tuberculosis.
  - Silvanus Trevail, 52, British architect, shot himself to death in a train lavatory.

== November 8, 1903 (Sunday) ==
- At about 2 a.m. in Brinkley, Arkansas, a mob of 10 or 15 people lynched Z. C. Cadle, a white man, who had killed Policeman J. C. Cox with a bladed weapon.
- Born:
  - Luigi Allemandi, Italian footballer and manager; in San Damiano Macra, Italy (d. 1978)
  - Anton Fredrik Klaveness, Norwegian shipowner and Olympic equestrian; in Sandefjord, Norway (d. 1981)
- Died: Vasily Dokuchaev, 57, Russian geologist and geographer

== November 9, 1903 (Monday) ==
- Pietro Rosano, who had taken office as the new Italian Minister of Finance on November 3, fatally shot himself at his home in Naples as a result of family problems and a campaign against him by socialist newspapers.
- Republican Representative Joseph Gurney Cannon of Illinois was sworn in as Speaker of the United States House of Representatives.
- At about 7:45 p.m. in Wabaunsee County, Kansas, William Thomas Smale was shot and killed through his farmhouse's dining room window by an assailant outside the house while Smale's wife and children were seated around the dining room table. The telephone lines to the house had been cut. Despite a great deal of sensational newspaper speculation, the murder would never be solved.
- Born:
  - Jacques Dumesnil (born Marie Émile Eugène André Joly), French film and television actor; in Paris, France (d. 1998)
  - Léon-Étienne Duval, French Catholic prelate and cardinal; in Chênex, Haute-Savoie, France (d. 1996)
  - Margaret Fay Shaw, American photographer and folklorist; in Glenshaw, Pennsylvania (d. 2004)
- Died:
  - Alfred Edward Rodewald, 41, English merchant and musician, died from complications of influenza.
  - Montagu Corry, 1st Baron Rowton, KCVO, CB, PC, DL, 65, British philanthropist and public servant
  - Andrew Stewart, 67, member of the United States House of Representatives from Pennsylvania

== November 10, 1903 (Tuesday) ==
- Harvard University dedicated its Germanic Museum, which would later become the Busch–Reisinger Museum. Harvard Professor William James spoke at the dedication ceremony of the museum, which was initially housed in Rogers Hall.
- Henry Innes-Ker, 8th Duke of Roxburghe, a Scottish peer, married American heiress Mary Goelet at Saint Thomas Church in New York City, in a ceremony performed by William Croswell Doane, the Episcopal Bishop of Albany. A predominantly female crowd of 10,000 lined the streets of New York to see Goelet on her way to the wedding. Prior to the ceremony, police were required to eject prominent women who had seated themselves in the church galleries. Well-dressed women crawled into a coal hole under the church to listen to the ceremony, and also had to be removed by the police.
- The resignation of political cartoonist Homer Davenport from the New York Journal and New York American was announced.
- The passenger steamer Atlantic was destroyed by fire in Georgian Bay, Ontario. The crew and passengers were able to escape by boat to Parry Sound.
- Born:
  - Rudolf Batz, German SS functionary; in Langensalza, Thuringia, Germany (d. 1961, suicide)
  - Giuseppe Galluzzi, Italian footballer and manager; in Florence, Italy (d. 1973)
  - Lars Theodor Jonsson, Swedish Olympic cross-country skier; in Frostviken, Strömsund Municipality, Sweden (d. 1998)
  - Leandro Verì, Italian carabiniere; in San Vito Chietino, Province of Chieti, Italy (d. 1938, shot in line of duty)
- Died: Lester A. Beardslee, 67, United States Navy rear admiral, died of apoplexy.

== November 11, 1903 (Wednesday) ==
- Pope Pius X bestowed the galero on two new cardinals: Rafael Merry del Val, the Cardinal Secretary of State, and Giuseppe Callegari, the Bishop of Padua.
- American politician William Jennings Bryan departed New York on the RMS Majestic for a European tour. When speaking to reporters before his departure, he refused to comment on the Panama situation.
- Edward Green, an African-American man, was nearly lynched in Bronxville, New York, after being accused of attempted robbery and assault on a white woman. Green would be acquitted of the crime a few days later after his alibi was confirmed.
- Born:
  - Thomas Allibone, English physicist; in Sheffield, West Riding of Yorkshire, England (d. 2003)
  - Blessed Victoria Díez Bustos de Molina, Spanish teacher and religious woman; in Seville, Kingdom of Spain (d. 1936, shot)
  - Vittorio Moccagatta, Italian World War II naval officer; in Bologna, Italy (d. 1941, killed in action)
  - Hermanni Pihlajamäki, Finnish policeman and Olympic champion freestyle wrestler; in Nurmo, Finland (d. 1982)
  - Isaac Bashevis Singer, Polish-born American writer; in Leoncin, Congress Poland, Russian Empire (probable date) (d. 1991)
- Died: William H. Hughes, 39, American businessman and politician, committed suicide by hanging.

== November 12, 1903 (Thursday) ==
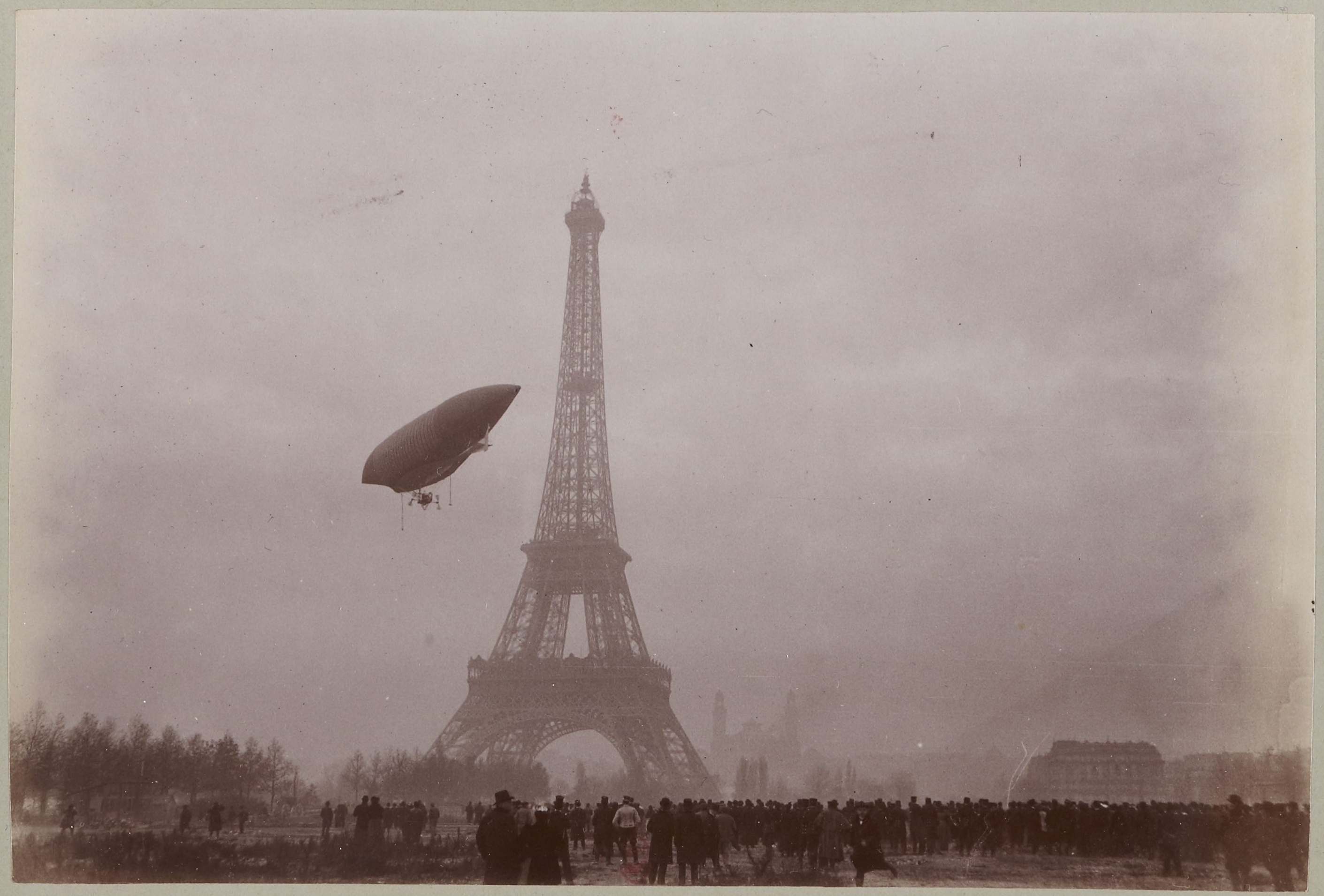
A Lebaudy dirigible beside the Eiffel Tower in November 1903

- The Lebaudy Frères made a controlled dirigible flight of 37 miles (60 km) from Moisson to Paris, France.
- Born: Jack Oakie (born Lewis Delaney Offield), American actor; in Sedalia, Missouri (d. 1978)
- Died: Alfred Doten, 74, American journalist and diarist

== November 13, 1903 (Friday) ==
- The United States gave de jure recognition to the independence of Panama.
- Born:
  - Thomas Head Raddall, Canadian historical novelist; in Hythe, Kent, England (d. 1994)
  - Paul Sheriff, Russian-born British film art director; in Moscow, Russian Empire (d. 1960)
  - Virginia Tonelli, Italian World War II partisan; in Castelnovo del Friuli, Italy (d. 1944, execution by burning)
  - Luigi Viviani, Italian engineer and soldier; in Crema, Lombardy, Italy (d. 1943, execution by firing squad)
- Died:
  - Andrew Haswell Green, 83, American lawyer, city planner and civic leader, was murdered outside his home in a case of mistaken identity.
  - Camille Pissarro, 73, French painter
  - Yrjö Sakari Yrjö-Koskinen (born Georg Zakarias Forsman), 72, Finnish historian and politician

== November 14, 1903 (Saturday) ==
- At 1 a.m., Moros attacked and killed four soldiers of the United States Army 28th Infantry Regiment who were guarding a boat near Marahui by Lake Lanao in the Philippines. Camp Keithley, a U.S. Army installation in the Philippines, would subsequently be named after one of the fallen soldiers, Guy Furnando Keithley.
- After a fierce altercation over the war budget on November 10, French politicians Henri Maurice Berteaux and Georges Berthoulat fought a pistol duel in the Paris suburbs, exchanging two shots without result and remaining unreconciled.

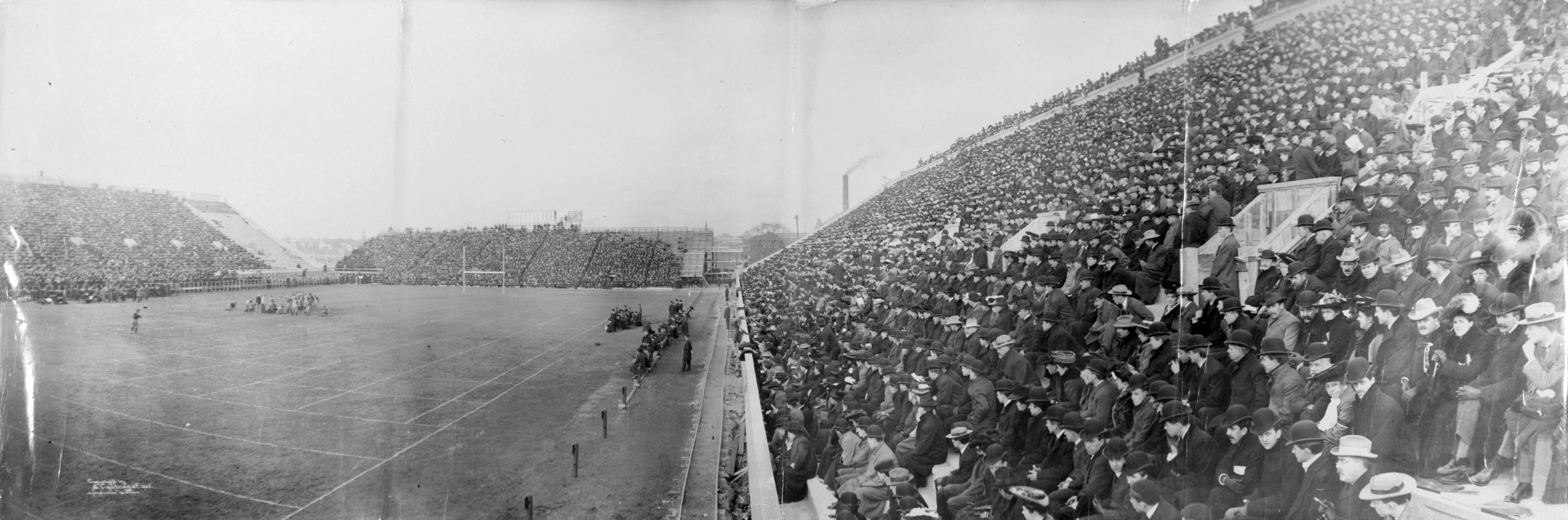
Opening game of Harvard Stadium (Harvard vs. Dartmouth)

- Harvard Stadium opened in Allston, Boston, Massachusetts, with a college football game pitting Harvard against Dartmouth. Harvard lost the game by a score of 11–0.
- Riots caused by a strike by unionized carmen completely disrupted streetcar service in Chicago and resulted in multiple injuries.
- Forty people were killed and 23 injured in a rear-end collision on the Illinois Central Railroad in Kentwood, Louisiana. Many of the victims were African-American gandy dancers.
- Self-described anarchist John Otto, believed to be planning to kill Colorado Governor James Hamilton Peabody, was arrested at the Colorado State Capitol in Denver.
- By a vote of 88 to 77, the community of Hollywood, California, chose to be incorporated as a municipality.
- Born: Georg Gehring, German Olympic Greco-Roman wrestler; in Frankenthal, Rhineland-Palatinate, Germany (d. 1943, killed in action in World War II)
- Died: John Andrew Davidson, 51, Manitoba politician

== November 15, 1903 (Sunday) ==
- General The Viscount Kitchener, Commander-in-Chief, India, broke both bones in his left leg in a horse-riding accident in Simla, British India. The bones were not set properly, and Kitchener would limp slightly for the rest of his life.
- The opera Tiefland, composed by Eugen d'Albert, received its world premiere at the Neues Deutsches Theater in Prague.
- Born:
  - Stewie Dempster (born Charles Stewart Dempster), New Zealand Test cricketer and coach; in Wellington, New Zealand (d. 1974)
  - Kiyoshi Jinzai, Japanese novelist, translator and literary critic; in Tokyo, Japan (d. 1957, oral cancer)
  - Tilly Losch, Austrian dancer, choreographer, actress and painter; in Vienna, Austria-Hungary (d. 1975)
  - Lucien Rebatet, French author and journalist; in Moras-en-Valloire, Drôme, France (d. 1972)
- Died: Charles Joseph Marie, 6th Duke d'Ursel, 55, Belgian politician, President of the Senate

== November 16, 1903 (Monday) ==
- A fire destroyed an electric railway car barn and 72 streetcars in Cleveland, Ohio. Two Cleveland firefighters were killed when a wall collapsed on them.
- Born:
  - Thorold Dickinson, British film director and screenwriter; in Bristol, England (d. 1984)
  - Väinö Liikkanen, Finnish forester and Olympic cross-country skier; in Pihlaja, Virolahti, Finland (d. 1957)
  - Barbara McLean, American film editor; in Palisades Park, New Jersey (d. 1996)
  - Casimir Oberfeld, Polish-born French composer; in Łowicz, Vistula Land, Russian Empire (d. 1945 in Auschwitz concentration camp)
  - Melchior Wezel, Swiss Olympic champion gymnast (date of death unknown)
- Died:
  - Shirley Waldemar Baker, 66–67, English Methodist missionary, second Prime Minister of Tonga
  - Princess Elisabeth of Hesse and by Rhine, 8, died of typhoid fever.
  - Camillo Sitte, 60, Austrian architect, painter and urban theorist

== November 17, 1903 (Tuesday) ==
- The opera Mademoiselle Fifi, composed by César Cui, received its world premiere at the Hermitage Theatre in Saint Petersburg, Russia.
- The Russian Social Democratic Labour Party split into two groups: the Bolsheviks (Russian for "majority") and the Mensheviks (Russian for "minority").
- The Sacred Congregation of Rites met to discuss the cause of Joan of Arc's canonization at the behest of Pope Pius X.
- In Petrópolis, Brazil, representatives of Bolivia and Brazil signed the Treaty of Petrópolis, resolving a dispute over the territory of Acre.
- Born:
  - Wim Anderiesen (born Willem Gerardus Anderiesen), Dutch footballer; in Amsterdam, Netherlands (d. 1944, pneumonia)
  - Teddy Bowen (born Samuel Edward Bowen), English footballer; in Hednesford, England (d. 1981)
  - Nico Diederichs, third State President of South Africa; in Ladybrand, Ladybrand District, Orange River Colony (d. 1978)
  - Lucien Michard, French Olympic champion and professional racing cyclist; in Epinay-sur-Seine, Seine-Saint-Denis, France (d. 1985)

== November 18, 1903 (Wednesday) ==
- In Washington, D.C., U.S. Secretary of State John Hay, representing the United States, and French engineer Philippe Bunau-Varilla, representing Panama, signed the Hay–Bunau-Varilla Treaty, giving the U.S. exclusive rights over the Panama Canal Zone.
- At 9:30 p.m. in Denver, Colorado, Rev. Mariano Felice Lepore, the pastor of Our Lady of Mount Carmel Catholic Church, and Giuseppe Sorice fatally shot each other in a duel over a card game. Lepore's estate was worth $20,000, part of which would be claimed in 1907 by his wife and son.
- Born: Roland Anderson, American film art director; in Boston, Massachusetts (d. 1989)
- Died: Samuel F. Phillips, 79, American civil rights lawyer and politician, Solicitor General of the United States

== November 19, 1903 (Thursday) ==
- William Howell Clendenen, the operator on duty at Brown's Tower, a railroad telegraph tower in Wayne Township, Clinton County, Pennsylvania, sent a telegraph message reading, "I am shot and dying. Please send help." Rescuers found Clendenen dead; he had been both shot and bludgeoned with a spike maul. The murder would never be officially solved, although the murderer reportedly would die a few years later.
- In Washington, D.C., temperance activist Carrie Nation attempted to meet with President Roosevelt at the White House and to speak to the United States Senate, but was not allowed to do either.
- A rear-end collision between a freight train and work train on the Cleveland, Cincinnati, Chicago and St. Louis Railway between Mackinaw and Tremont, Illinois, killed 31 railroad workers and injured at least 15.
- Born:
  - Nancy Carroll, American actress; in New York City, New York (d. 1965)
  - Asaf Messerer, Soviet ballet dancer and teacher; in Vilnius, Lithuania (d. 1992)
  - Fritz Schmidt, German Commissioner-General for Political Affairs and Propaganda in the occupied Netherlands during World War II; in Eisbergen, Westphalia (d. 1943, fall from train)
- Died:
  - Julian Rix, 51–52, American landscape artist, died after an operation.
  - Hugh Stowell Scott (a.k.a. Henry Seton Merriman), 41, English novelist, died of appendicitis.

== November 20, 1903 (Friday) ==
- American troops commanded by Maj. Gen. Leonard Wood attacked and captured a Moro position in the mountains on the island of Jolo. At least 75 Moros were killed. American soldier Martin Brennan of Troop A, 14th Cavalry Regiment, was killed; two other Americans were wounded.
- Born:
  - Hugo Barth, German administrative officer and Olympic decathlete; in Rodt, Loßburg, Baden-Württemberg, German Empire (d. 1976)
  - Anton Bilek, Austrian footballer and manager (d. 1991)
  - Alexandra Danilova, Russian-born American prima ballerina; in Petergof, Russian Empire (d. 1997)
  - Leo Menardi, Italian screenwriter, producer and film director; in Turin, Piedmont, Italy (d. 1954)
  - Ishtiaq Hussain Qureshi, Pakistani historian and educator; in Patyali, United Provinces of Agra and Oudh, British India (d. 1981)
  - Allen Rivkin, American screenwriter; in Wisconsin (d. 1990, kidney failure)
- Died:
  - Gaston de Chasseloup-Laubat, 37, French aristocrat and race car driver
  - Francis M. Drake, 72, American Union Army general and politician, 16th Governor of Iowa
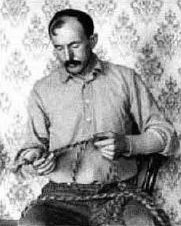
    Portrait of Tom Horn during his imprisonment
  - Tom Horn, 42, American scout, cowboy and soldier, was executed by hanging in Cheyenne, Wyoming.
  - Wilbur N. Taylor, 56, United States Army soldier and Medal of Honor recipient, died of an aneurysm.

== November 21, 1903 (Saturday) ==
- The Harvard Crimson football team lost their second game in their new stadium, the annual Harvard–Yale game, by a score of 16–0. 19-year-old Eleanor Roosevelt visited her cousin, Franklin D. Roosevelt, a Harvard College student, for the game.
- In Tuscola, Illinois, workmen digging behind the opera house discovered the engagement ring of Mrs. Joseph Gurney Cannon, the wife of the new Speaker of the U.S. House of Representatives, which she had lost 31 years earlier. Mrs. Cannon had accidentally dropped the ring into a wastebasket in her husband's office in Tuscola.
- A shanty fire on the Pennsylvania Railroad in Lilly, Pennsylvania killed 35 Italian laborers. Some of those who died had escaped the building but went back inside to retrieve their life savings.
- In the district of Cripple Creek, Colorado, a bomb explosion in the Vindicator mine killed two men.
- Born:
  - Étienne Lamotte, Belgian Catholic priest and Indologist; in Dinant, Belgium (d. 1983)
  - Mikhail Loginov, Soviet weapon designer; in Ivanishinskiye Gorky, Tver Oblast, Russian Empire (d. 1940, tuberculosis)
- Died:
  - Julian Marshall, 67, English music and print collector and tennis player
  - Pietro Saccardo, 73, Italian architect
  - Willard G. Smith, 76, Mormon pioneer, member of the Utah Territorial legislature

== November 22, 1903 (Sunday) ==
- Pope Pius X issued the motu proprio Tra le sollecitudini, ending the use of castrati as singers in the Sistine Chapel.
- Franklin Roosevelt visited Eleanor in Groton, Massachusetts, where she was staying with her brother Hall, and they became engaged.
- Winfield Kimbrough, the town marshal of Wilton, Arkansas, was mortally wounded in a gunfight with Chatham, a railroad man. Kimbrough would die of his wounds the following day.
- Born:
  - Ernest Neuhard, French racing cyclist; in Troyes, Aube, France (d. 1980)
  - David Rees-Williams, British Royal Artillery officer and politician; in Bridgend, Wales (d. 1976)
- Died: George H. Steuart, 75, Confederate States Army brigadier general, died from stomach complications.

== November 23, 1903 (Monday) ==
- Italian operatic tenor Enrico Caruso made his United States debut at the Metropolitan Opera in New York City in a performance of Rigoletto by Giuseppe Verdi.

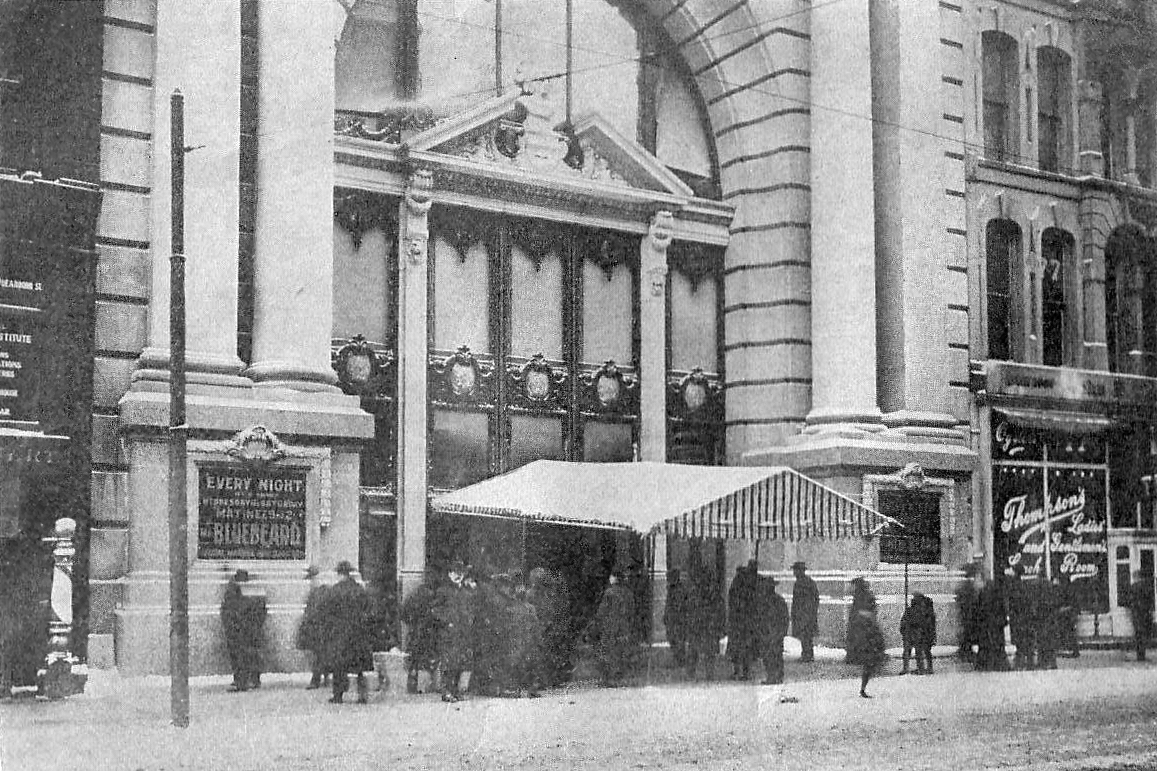
The Iroquois Theatre

- The Iroquois Theatre opened at 24–28 West Randolph Street in Chicago, Illinois. It would be the site of a devastating fire on December 30 which killed 602 people.
- Colorado Governor James Hamilton Peabody sent the state militia into Cripple Creek to break up a miners' strike.
- Born:
  - Kea Bouman (born Cornelia Bouman), Dutch Olympic tennis player; in Almelo, Netherlands (d. 1998)
  - Juan Jover, Spanish racing driver; in Barcelona, Catalonia, Spain (d. 1960 in road accident)
  - Joe Nibloe, Scottish footballer; in Corkerhill, Glasgow, Scotland (d. 1976)

== November 24, 1903 (Tuesday) ==
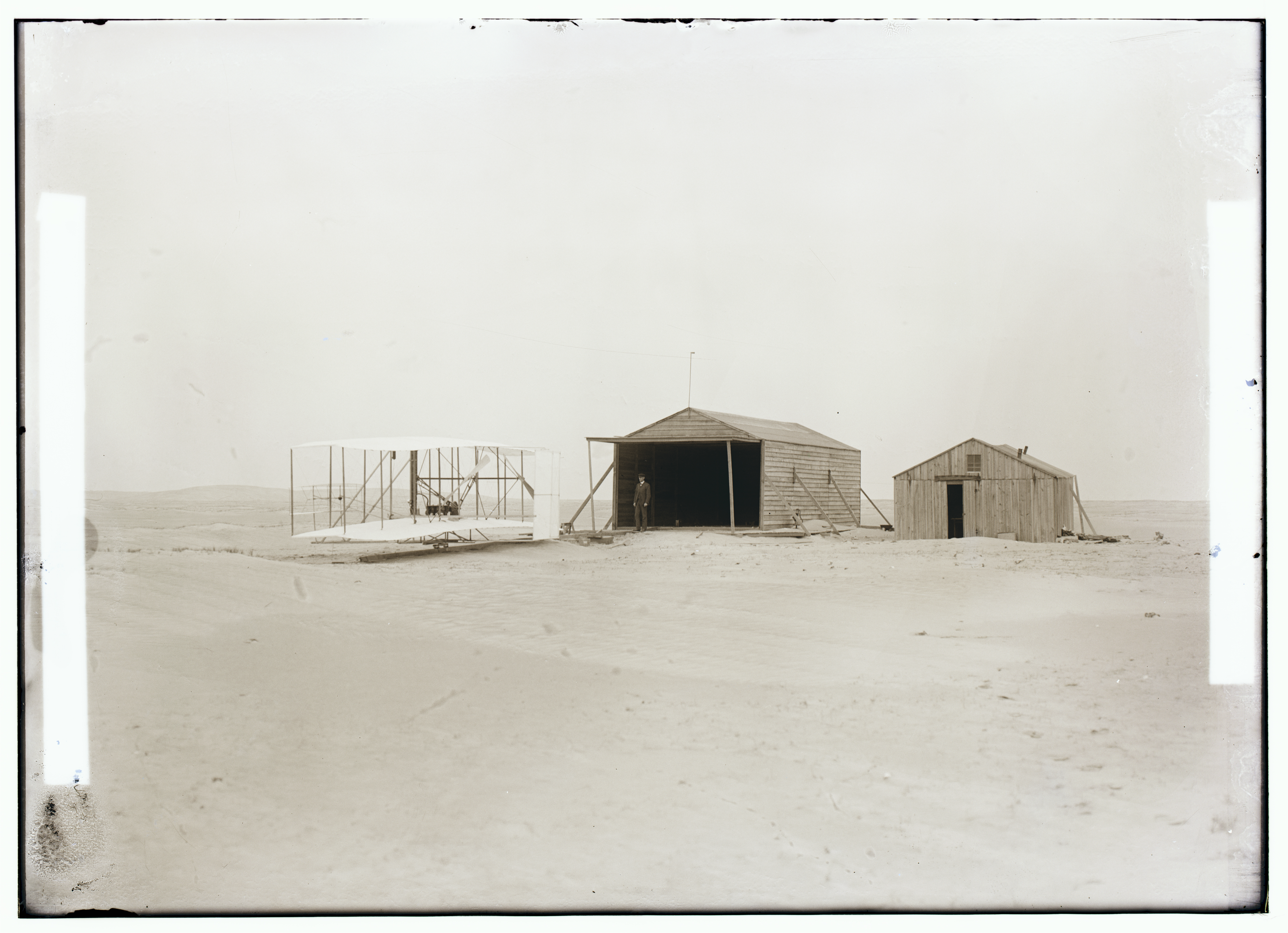
The Wright Flyer near Kitty Hawk, North Carolina

- Sir George Sydenham Clarke retired as Governor of Victoria.
- Ernest Roume, Governor General of French West Africa, issued a decree establishing a free, non-compulsory federal school system for the indigenous peoples of the region.
- At the Bank of England in the City of London, a mentally ill man fired four shots from a revolver at Kenneth Grahame, the secretary of the Bank of England, better known as the author of The Golden Age and "The Reluctant Dragon". Grahame was unhurt. He would publish his best-known work, The Wind in the Willows, in 1908.
- In Savannah, Georgia, Edward J. McRee, a member of the Georgia General Assembly, and his brother William McRee pled guilty in United States court to 13 indictments on charges of violating the Thirteenth Amendment to the United States Constitution by holding African Americans in bondage. The McRees were sentenced to pay a $1000 fine in two of the cases and received suspended sentences for the others. Five other men, including a former sheriff, a prominent attorney, farmers and manufacturers, were also indicted on charges related to the continued existence of African American slavery in the state of Georgia.
- Born: Milton Steinberg, American rabbi, philosopher and theologian; in Rochester, New York (d. 1950)
- Died:
  - Johann Baptist von Anzer, 52, Bavarian Catholic bishop of the German Mission to China
  - Angelo Maffucci, 56, Italian pathologist
  - Sir John Blundell Maple, 1st Baronet, 58, English businessman
  - Joseph Stallaert, 78, Belgian painter
  - Jonathan S. Willis, 73, American minister and farmer, United States Representative from Delaware

== November 25, 1903 (Wednesday) ==
- Born:
  - J. N. Findlay, South African philosopher; in Pretoria, Transvaal Colony (d. 1987)
  - DeHart Hubbard, American Olympic champion track and field athlete; in Cincinnati, Ohio (d. 1976)
  - Issa Pliyev, Soviet military commander; in Stariy Batakoyurt, Russian Empire (d. 1979)
- Died:
  - Sabino Arana, 38, Spanish Basque writer and nationalist, died of Addison's disease.
  - Harriet Hubbard Ayer (born Harriet Hubbard), 54, American socialite, cosmetics entrepreneur and journalist, died from pneumonia and nephritis.

== November 26, 1903 (Thursday) ==
- During a Thanksgiving morning football game between Winthrop High and the Winthrop Athletics at Ingleside Park in Winthrop, Massachusetts, James Collins, a soldier from Fort Banks who was playing halfback for the Athletics, was rendered unconscious after being tackled. He would die of his injuries on November 30 at Massachusetts General Hospital.
- While fighting a Thanksgiving Day fire at the Allen Brothers Warehouse in Omaha, Nebraska, four Omaha firefighters were fatally injured when the warehouse collapsed.
- Born:
  - Aubry Campbell Ingram, founder of the Asociación de Scouts de Nicaragua; in Bluefields, Nicaragua (d. 2000)
  - Alice Herz-Sommer (born Alice Herz), Czech-British supercentenarian, pianist and teacher; in Prague, Kingdom of Bohemia, Austria-Hungary (d. 2014)

== November 27, 1903 (Friday) ==
- The opera Le donne curiose, composed by Ermanno Wolf-Ferrari, received its world premiere in Munich in German translation (as Der Neugierigen Frauen).
- Harvey Chase of Kirkwood, Missouri, died from injuries sustained in a high school football game several weeks earlier.
- Born:
  - Hans Hinrich, German film director and actor; in Berlin, Germany (d. 1974)
  - Johnny Blood, National Football League halfback; in New Richmond, Wisconsin (d. 1985)
  - Julien Moineau, French road bicycle racer; in Clichy, Hauts-de-Seine, France (d. 1980)
  - Lars Onsager, Norwegian chemist, recipient of the Nobel Prize in Chemistry; in Kristiania, Norway (d. 1976)
  - Mona Washbourne, English actress; in Sparkhill, Birmingham, England (d. 1988)

== November 28, 1903 (Saturday) ==
- SS Petriana was wrecked on a reef outside Melbourne, Australia, causing one of the world's first major oil spills.
- In North Carolina, the Wright brothers conducted another test of the Wright Flyer's engine. A propeller shaft cracked again, causing Orville Wright to return to Dayton to make new steel propeller shafts.
- Born:
  - Tudor Ciortea, Romanian composer and musicologist; in Brașov, Romania (d. 1982)
  - Willy Gervin, Danish Olympic cyclist; in Copenhagen, Denmark (d. 1951)
  - J. Howard McGrath, United States Senator from Rhode Island and Attorney General of the United States; in Woonsocket, Rhode Island (d. 1966, heart attack)
  - Gladys O'Connor, British-born Canadian businesswoman and character actress; in London, England (d. 2012)
  - Stanisław Prauss, Polish painter and aircraft constructor; in Warsaw, Warsaw Governorate, Congress Poland (d. 1997)
- Died: Jules Levy, 65, British-American cornetist, teacher and composer, died of a stroke.

== November 29, 1903 (Sunday) ==
- Born:
  - E. Harold Munn, American temperance movement leader and presidential candidate; in Bay Village, Ohio (d. 1992)
  - Dumitru Stăniloae, Romanian Eastern Orthodox priest and theologian; in Vlădeni, Dumbrăvița, Romania (d. 1993)

== November 30, 1903 (Monday) ==
- Fire destroyed the original Brooklyn Academy of Music building, on Montague Street in Brooklyn Heights. One person was killed.
- The Chicago Tribune reported that 19 players had sustained fatal injuries during the 1903 American football season.
- Three African-American men – Phil Davis, Walter Carter and Clint Thomas – were lynched near Belcher, Louisiana, for the shooting death of businessman Robert Adger. The three men were reportedly allowed to pray before being hanged.
- Born:
  - Claude Arrieu (pseudonym for Louise-Marie Simon), French composer; in Paris, France (d. 1990)
  - Madame Grès (born Germaine Émilie Krebs), French couturier and costume designer; in Paris, France (d. 1993)
- Died:
  - Joseph Kellogg, 91, Canadian-born American steamboat captain and businessman, died of old age.
  - Charles E. Kilbourne Sr., 59, United States Army officer, father of Charles E. Kilbourne
