= Ekstrand =

Ekstrand is a Swedish surname. Notable people with the surname include:

- Gunnar Ekstrand (1892–1966), Swedish Olympic diver
- Hans Ekstrand (1903–1969), German politician
- Joel Ekstrand (born 1989), Swedish footballer
- Ulf Ekstrand (born 1957), Swedish Olympic ice speed skater
- Yngve Ekstrand (1888–1951), Swedish naval officer
