= Hugo Barth =

German decathlete (1903–1976)

Personal information
- Nationality: German
- Born: 20 November 1903 Rodt, Loßburg, German Empire
- Died: 5 May 1976 (aged 72) Nürtingen, West Germany

Sport
- Sport: Athletics
- Event: Decathlon

Hugo Barth (20 November 1903 – 5 May 1976) was a German athlete. He competed in the men's decathlon at the 1928 Summer Olympics.
