= Sophus Ruge =

German geographer and historian

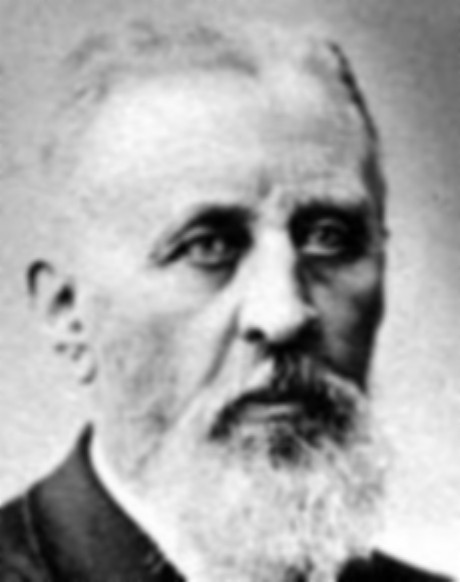
Sophys Ruge

Sophus Ruge (26 March 1831 – 23 December 1903) was a German geographer and historian, he studied about European discoveries and written works about Portuguese discoveries. His studies was a different vision on one traditionally followed in Portugal, he had translated a large part from Portuguese and had been influential in the development of Portuguese historiography.

== Biography ==
Ruge was born in the Frisian town of Dorum located near Geestemünde in the Kingdom of Hanover. His father of Christoph August Ruge (1790–1834) was from Neuhaus/Oste and was a doctor in medicine. During the Battle of Waterloo, he was an English field doctor, he later moved to Cuxhaven and in 1817, he was physician in Dorum, there he later married the lawyer's daughter Elise Hennings (1804–?). Ruge later studied in Göttingen and Halle. In 1872, he became professor in geography and ethnography at the Technische Hochschule de Dresden (Dresden Technical High School) where he headed until his death.

He later married Anna Caecilie Busse (1830–1903) and had children including Frieda Elisa (1860–?), Reinhold Friedrich (1862–?), Walther Karl Theodor (1865–?, geographer) and Elsbeth Sophie (1870–?).

He took charge of producing the second edition of the review and enlarged Geschichte der Erdkunde , by Peschel, published in 1887 which he earned him a recognition and consideration of geographers and historians of the time. One work that was most personal Geschichte des Zeitalters des Entdeckungen (History During the Age of Discovery), made between 1881 and 1883 in the Oncken Collection, enshrined his reputation as a geography historian.

Ruge started to revise and actualized numerous works about its essays. In 1878, he published Die Geschichte der Erdkunde (History of Geography), founded by Oscar Peschel and in 1887, Die Erdbeschreibung (Description of the Land) founded by Franz Heinrich Ungewitter.

He published numerous works, published a large numerous of books related to geographic history, it includes an important study from 1903 about Portuguese discoveries in Africa as well as the Azores.

He was one of the most listened critics in the area of historiography of European expansion, with the notable erudition on the security of his options. He intensely contributed to periodicals including Petermanns Mittelungen and Jahrbuch de Wagner (Wagner Yearbook), where he left and important scattered contribution.

In 1863, he founded the Dresden Geographic Society (Dresdner Verein für Erdkunde) alongside Karl Andree (sometimes as Karl Andrée), which he headed for around three decades. He was also member of the Kgl. Sächsischen Gesellschaft der Wissenschaften zu Leipzig (Kingdom of Saxony Academy of Sciences of Leipzig) and the Saxon Academy of Sciences (Sächsischen Akademie der Wissenschafte) and many other geographic societies in Germany and abroad.

Prof. Dr. Sophus Ruge died on 23 December 1903 at the age of 72 in Klotzsche, near Dresden. He was later buried at Alten Friedhof Klotzsche (Old Klotzsche Cemetery).

In Dresdner Sudvörstadt, a street named Rugestraße (Rugestrasse) is named for him.

== Works ==
- Geschichte des Zeitalters der Entdeckungen (Berlin 1881–83)
- Abhandlungen und Vorträge zur Geschichte der Erdkunde (Dresden 1888)
- Historia da Época dos descobrimentos, Portuguese version of the review versão portugueza revista, ampliada e instruída com numerosas notas relativas á epopeia maritima portugueza por Manuel d'Oliveira Ramos, Aillaud e Bertrand, Lisboa, 1927.
- História da época dos descobrimentos, translation and preface by Manuel d'Oliveira, Aillaud end Bertrand, Lisbon, 1900.
- Columbus, Hofmann & Co., Berlim, 1902.
- Die Entwicklung der Kartographie von Amerika bis 1570, Nachdruck Hildesheim/Nieuwkoop 1962 d. Ausg., Gotha, 1892.
- Kleine Geographie. Für die untere Lehrstufe in drei Jahreskursen. Erster Jahreskursus: Deutschland, G. Schönfeld´s Verlagsbuchhandlung, Dresden, 1877.
- Norwegen: Land und Leute – Monographien zur Erdkunde in Verbindung mit hervorragenden Fachgelehrten herausgegeben von A.Scobel, vol. III, Velhagen & Klasing, Bielefeld/Leipzig, 1899.
- Dresden und die Sächsische Schweiz (Dresden and Saxon Switzerland), Velhagen & Klasing, Bielefeld und Leipzig, 1903.
- Die Entdeckungsgeschichte der Neuen Welt, 1892.
- Die erste Landesvermessung des Kurstaates Sachsen von Matthias Oeder, 1889.
- Columbus, Harper's New Monthly Magazine, Columbus, October 1892.
- Die Entdeckung der Azoren (Discovery of the Azores), pp. 149–180 (esp. 178–179), 27th Jahresbericht des Vereins für Erdkunde, Dresden, 1901.
