= Willard G. Smith =

American politician and Mormon leader

Willard Gilbert Smith (May 9, 1827 – November 21, 1903) was a member of the Utah Territorial legislature.

Smith was born to Warren Smith and his wife Amanda Barnes in Amherst, Ohio. His parents joined the Church of Christ in 1831. They moved to Kirtland, Ohio, and then in 1838 went to Missouri where they settled at Hawn's Mill, Missouri. Smith was shot at during the Hawn's Mill Massacre; he was not injured but his father and a brother were killed while another brother, Alma Smith, was injured but survived. Smith's account is one of the major first hand accounts of the event.

Smith moved with his mother and surviving siblings to Quincy, Illinois, where his mother married again, to another man named Warren Smith. Willard assisted in building the Nauvoo Temple and then served in the Mormon Battalion. He then was involved in gold mining in California and settled on a farm in Oregon. His brother Alma, while returning from a mission in Hawaii, came to Oregon and convinced him to come to Utah Territory where he lived with his mother until 1860 when he was called to serve as a missionary for the Church of Jesus Christ of Latter-day Saints (LDS Church) in the British Isles. Smith served as a missionary from 1860 to 1863.

In 1865, Smith was made the LDS Church bishop of Morgan, Utah. The same year he married Huldah Cornelia Thurston whose father Thomas Jefferson Thurston was the moving force behind the Mormon settlement of the Morgan area. Smith continued as bishop of Morgan until 1877 when the Morgan Stake was organized and Smith was the first president. He served as stake president until 1893.

Willard and Huldah Smith were the parents of 12 children.

Smith was for many years the Probate Judge of Morgan County, the top local judge for the area. He also served four terms in the Utah Territorial Legislature.
