= Frances Emily White =

American anatomist and physiologist

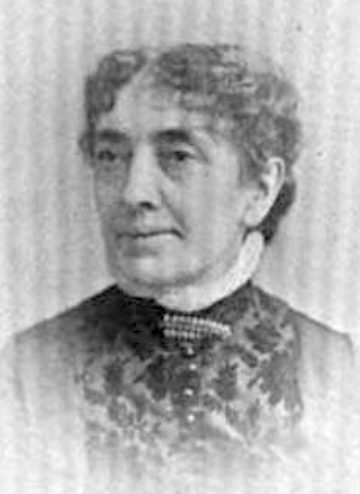
- Frances Emily White, from an 1895 publication
- Born: 8 June 1832; Andover, New Hampshire
- Died: 29 December 1903 (aged 71); Boston, Massachusetts
- Education: Woman's Medical College of Pennsylvania; Doctor of Medicine 1872
- Occupations: Anatomist and physiologist

Frances Emily White (8 June 1832 – 29 December 1903) was an American anatomist and physiologist.

White was born in Andover, New Hampshire, and educated at the Woman's Medical College of Pennsylvania. She went on to become a demonstrator in Anatomy and Instructor in Physiology from 1872 to 1876. White was then a Professor of Physiology from 1876 until her death in 1903.

White was one of the first women to lecture before the Franklin Institute of Philadelphia, and was the first woman delegate to the International Medical Congress, in 1890. She was also a lifelong advocate for women's education.

She died in Boston of uterine cancer at the age of 71.
