= 1903 East Paris train wreck =

Head-on collision on the Pere Marquette Railway, December 26, 1903

Coordinates: 42°54′19″N 85°34′53″W

East Paris train wreck
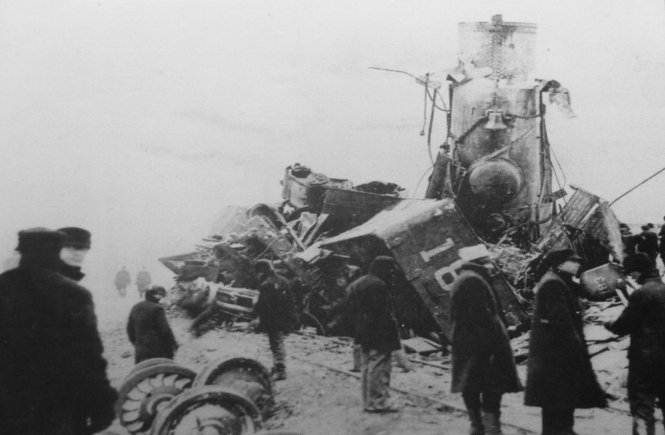
- Aftermath of the accident

Details
- Date: December 26, 1903
- Operator: Pere Marquette Railway
- Cause: signal failure

Statistics
- Trains: 2
- Deaths: 21
- Injured: 38

The East Paris train wreck was a head-on collision between two trains, which occurred on the Pere Marquette Railway on December 26, 1903. The crash was caused after a westbound stop signal was blown out by strong winds, causing the westbound train to fail to stop, and collide with an eastbound train.

== The accident ==
At around 5:40 pm, westbound train No. 5 was travelling down a hill just outside East Paris, Michigan at around 60 miles per hour (97 km/h), and approached a signal. However, the signal had been extinguished by the heavy snow and winds. Meanwhile, a Detroit-bound train, train No. 6, was climbing the hill at about 40 miles per hour (64 km/h). Shortly after, the two trains collided into each other on a long, sweeping curve, causing them to overturn. The crash killed 19 people and injured around 40 more; Two more victims later died of their injuries. Immediately after the crash, local farmers who had witnessed the two engines approaching each other assisted in removing casualties from the wreck.

== Investigation ==
Following the crash, the company investigated the events leading up to it. They found that staff at nearby McCords station had been aware there would be an accident 10 minutes in advance, after realising the signal was not showing up. However, despite alerting a local farmer, they were unable to prevent the crash.
