= Alexander van Geen =

Dutch modern pentathlete

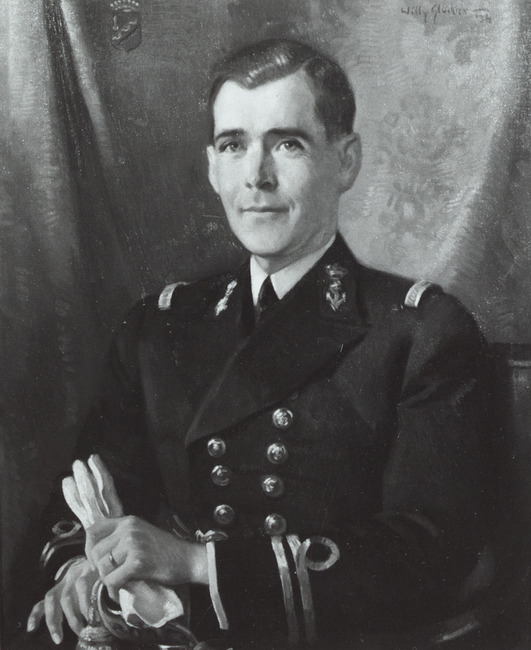
- Van Geen (portrait by Willy Sluiter)

Personal information
- Born: 7 December 1903 The Hague, Netherlands
- Died: 27 February 1942 (aged 38) Java Sea

Sport
- Sport: Modern pentathlon

Alexander van Geen (7 December 1903 – 27 February 1942) was a Dutch modern pentathlete. He competed at the 1936 Summer Olympics. During World War II he served in the Royal Netherlands Navy, and was killed during the Battle of the Java Sea.
