= Momtazuddin Ahmed (philosopher) =

Bengali philosopher and educationist

- মমতাজউদ্দিন আহমেদ
- Born: 24 December 1903; Brahmanbaria, Tippera District, Bengal Province
- Died: 12 September 1971 (aged 67); Dhaka, Bangladesh
- Education: University of Dhaka; University of London
- Spouse: Raisa Ahmed
- Children: 9

Momtazuddin Ahmed (Bengali: মমতাজউদ্দিন আহমেদ; 24 December 1903 – 12 September 1971) was a Bangladeshi philosopher and educationist.

== Early life and education ==
Ahmed was born to a Bengali Muslim family from Brahmanbaria in the erstwhile Tippera District of eastern Bengal. He studied in Dhaka University and obtained MA in philosophy in 1927. In 1937 he earned his PhD degree in philosophy from University College London. His research for dissertation was on metaphysics and logic under the advisers John Cook Wilson and Bradley Stamp.

== Career ==
=== Academia ===
Ahmed began his career as a lecturer at Dhaka University and later became the Head of the Department of Philosophy. He left the University in 1939 to become the first Muslim Principal of Dhaka College. He later served as the principal of Rajshahi College during 1945 to 1950. He then moved to Dhaka as Assistant Director of Public Instructions. He was elevated to the position of the Director of Public Instructions of East Pakistan in 1952, and in 1956 was appointed Education Adviser to the Government of Pakistan and concurrently held the position of the permanent secretary, Ministry of Education and Culture, Pakistan Government. He was appointed the Vice Chancellor of Rajshahi University in 1957 and stayed in the position until 1965.

=== Governmental ===
Some of Ahmed's national and international affiliations include the following.

- Member of the Commission on National Education (1958)
- Member of the Pakistan Commission on Students Welfare (1965)
- Member of the Board of Trustees of the Pakistan National Press Trust (1964)
- Member of the Board of Governors of the Central Institute of Islamic Research
- Member (elected) of the Central Board for the Development of Bengali (1968)
- President of the Inter-University Board in erstwhile Pakistan (1965)
- President (elected) of the Eighth Congress of the Pakistan Philosophical Society, Karachi (1965)
- President (elected) of the Pakistan Philosophical Congress (1968–1971)
- Member of the Dhaka University Syndicate
- Member of Islamabad University Senate (1968–71)

=== International ===
Ahmed represented the Government of Pakistan in many international initiatives, in bi-lateral and multilateral dialogues, conferences and fora including leading high level government delegations. These include leading delegations to Turkey, Iraq, Burma (Myanmar), Uruguay, India, Canada, France, the UK, the US to name some of them. He acted in the executive boards of international organizations and philanthropic foundations namely, the UNESCO General Conference in New Delhi in 1957 where he was elected a member of the Executive Board of UNESCO, the Nuffield Foundation, UK, and others. He also attended the International Conference on Education in Geneva in 1956. Dr. Ahmed had been special guest to the Bukigham Palace and to the White House. He died in Dhaka.

== Legacy ==
Rajshahi University has named its Arts Building as Momtaz Uddin Academic Building after him in appreciation of his contributions to the institution.
