= SS Kiowa (1903) =

Steam cargo ship

Coordinates: 42°19′21.1″N 70°51′50.5″W

History

United States
- Name: Kiowa
- Namesake: Kiowa
- Owner: Clyde Steamship Co.
- Builder: William Cramp & Sons, Philadelphia
- Yard number: 321
- Launched: 9 May 1903
- Sponsored by: Miss Elizabeth Milne
- Commissioned: 12 June 1903
- Maiden voyage: 17 June 1903
- Home port: New York
- Identification: US Official Number 161229; Call sign KSMN
- Fate: Sank, 26 December 1903

General characteristics
- Type: Cargo ship
- Tonnage: 2,953 GRT; 2,256 NRT
- Length: 291 ft 2 in (88.75 m)
- Beam: 43 ft 1 in (13.13 m)
- Depth: 20 ft 6 in (6.25 m)
- Installed power: 188 Nhp
- Propulsion: William Cramp & Sons 3-cylinder triple expansion
- Speed: 11.0 knots (12.7 mph; 20.4 km/h)

Kiowa was a steam cargo ship built in 1903 by William Cramp & Sons of Philadelphia for Clyde Steamship Company with intention of operating between New England and southern ports of the United States.

== Design and construction ==
In 1901 Clyde Steamship & Co. following an increase in their freight business placed an order for two steamers of approximately 3,000 GRT to serve on their East coast route between Boston and Jacksonville. Kiowa was the second of these vessels and was laid down at the William Cramp & Sons' Kensington Yard in Philadelphia (yard number 321) and launched on 9 May 1903, with Miss Elizabeth Milne, niece of B. Frank Clyde, a general agent and vice-president of Clyde Steamship Company, serving as the sponsor. The ship was of the three-deck type, designed specifically for cargo trade, and had all the modern machinery fitted for quick loading and unloading of heavy cargoes, including a large number of derricks and modern cranes similar to her sister-ship SS Huron.

Following an inspection and the successful completion of sea trials, the steamer was transferred to her owners and departed for New York on June 14.

As built, the ship was 291 feet 2 inches (88.75 m) long (between perpendiculars) and 43 feet 1 inch (13.13 m) abeam, a depth of 20 feet 6 inches (6.25 m). Kiowa was assessed at 2,953 GRT and 2,256 NRT and had deadweight of approximately 4,500. The vessel had a steel hull, and a single 188 nhp triple-expansion steam engine, with cylinders of 21-inch (53 cm), 34-inch (86 cm) and 56-inch (140 cm) diameter with a 36-inch (91 cm) stroke, that drove a single screw propeller, and moved the ship at up to 11.0 knots (12.7 mph; 20.4 km/h).

== Operational history ==
Upon delivery Kiowa sailed from Philadelphia for New York on June 14, 1903. After loading, she departed on her maiden voyage on June 17, arriving at Charleston on June 20. The vessel then continued down to Jacksonville for loading, and left it on June 24 for her return trip. After stopping at Charleston to take on more cargo, she arrived at New York on June 27, thus ending her maiden voyage.

Kiowa continued serving the same route for the rest of her career, connecting Charleston and Jacksonville with Boston and New York, with occasional stops at Brunswick. The steamer carried a variety of general cargo from the southern ports, mostly lumber, cotton, naval stores, vegetables and fruit.

In the evening of September 15, 1903 Kiowa was proceeding on her trip from Boston to Charleston, and while between Cape Poge and Cross Rip Shoal in hazy weather struck the port bow of schooner Howard B. Peck on her way from Norfolk for Calais with a cargo of coal. As a result, the schooner had her bowsprit and flying jibboom carried away together with all sails and rigging, and had a 20 feet wide gap was open in her hull. Kiowa took the schooner in tow and brought her into Vineyard Haven at around 21:00 on the same day. The steamer suffered little damage and was able to continue on her voyage.

=== Sinking ===
Kiowa left Jacksonville on the return leg of her 14th coastal trip on December 18, 1903, bound for New York and Boston. She was under command of captain Ira Ketcham Chichester, had a crew of 31 men and was fully loaded. The vessel stopped at Charleston to embark more cargo and departed from port on December 21. After calling at New York on December 23 where she discharged a portion of her load, she continued to Boston. The bulk of her cargo consisted of nearly 200,000 feet of hard pine lumber, in addition to cotton, rice, rosin, turpentine, iron and oranges and pineapples. The vessel passed the Highland Light around 07:15 on December 26 and soon after encountered a snowstorm. The seas became rougher and the wind got stronger and when the ship arrived at the entrance to the Boston harbor the snow squalls were so thick it was nearly impossible to see anything. Under those circumstances, captain Chichester decided to anchor the ship just off the entrance to the harbor, about two miles off the Boston Light and in line with Thieves Ledge to the east. Due to heavy snowstorm, Kiowa only had one lookout and a watch officer on deck ringing the bell periodically, with the rest of the crew being below or in their quarters. At about 10:00 on the same day United Fruit Company's freighter Admiral Dewey, under command of captain F. S. Israel, departed Boston carrying some cargo, mails and 35 passengers to Port Antonio and Puerto Limón. While it was snowing at the time of her departure, it was possible to see the buoys and other navigational guides, and captain Israel had no problem slowly sailing out of the harbor and through the narrows. By the time the ship arrived by Boston Light, the weather suddenly changed for the worse, with heavy snowfall reducing visibility to practically nothing. At around 11:20, about a mile south of Boston Light, one of the lookouts on board the fruiter suddenly spotted a ship lying across her course, and the captain pulled the helm hard aport and ordered the engines to be reversed, but due to very short distance between the vessels, Admiral Dewey smashed straight into Kiowa' port side nearly cutting her in half.

The ships soon separated opening a gaping hole in injured steamer's hull, and water started to rush in. Captain Chichester immediately ordered the watertight bulkhead doors closed and a distress calls were blown while Admiral Dewey remained nearby trying to figure out her damage. The distress calls were heard by the health department towboat Cormorant which happened to be about a quarter mile away from the place of the collision, towing a scow on her return trip to the city. Cormorant swung towards the vessels and as she closed in, Admiral Dewey started to move away, apparently only slightly damaged, and satisfied that Kiowa was getting attended to. Members of Kiowa's crew were mostly grouping on her bow, as her stern was slowly sinking, and were transferred one by one to the towboat. Once that was accomplished, Cormorant started toward the harbor and was soon after met by two tugs, Pallas and Storm King, sent to the rescue. 16 men were transferred to them from Cormorant and all three vessels proceeded to Boston arriving in port around 14:30.

After filing his report with Clyde Steamship Co., captain Chichester returned aboard tug Storm King to the place of the accident to evaluate prospects of salvage work. However, by the time of his arrival, the bulkhead doors that apparently kept the steamer's bow up above the water, gave in and the ship went to the bottom, sinking in approximately 6 fathoms (36 ft; 11 m) of water. The only things that could be seen were Kiowa' two masts and her smoke-stack.

The wreck was examined by divers the next day to evaluate the damage sustained by the vessel, to assess the possibility of patching the hole in her hull, and prospects of raising the ship and possible unloading her cargo. Since the condition of the steamer's hull was not fully known it was decided first to remove as much cargo as possible before further evaluation could be performed. The work on discharging cargo started right away and continued for several days while the weather was still good, with cargo beingtransferred to lighters and carried to port. On January 2, 1904 a storm swept through the area and possibly damaged Kiowa as a lot of wreckage came ashore afterwards, including barrels of turpentine, cases of oranges, bales of lumber and cotton. Large quantities of timber came ashore in Nantasket destroying several wooden breakwaters in the process, while many cases of oranges and barrels of oil and turpentine were washed on shore and picked up by local residents. Following the storm, the weather remained stormy for about a week and no more cargo removal was done, and in the meantime, the wreck was marked with a bell buoy to warn ships entering and exiting the harbor. Another storm came on January 11, and considerable amount of timber was seen floating around the wreck in the ice afterwards. A few more storms went through the area preventing the wrecking company from being able to do any further work on the wreck. Some of the cargo that was washed up, and collected from the sea was sold locally at auctions netting the wrecking company a few thousand dollars, while some of the timber was found washed up on the beach as far away as Chatham.

On June 8, 1904 it was announced that the wrecking company decided to abandon the work on trying to raise Kiowa. On July 16 U.S. Engineer Office gave a notice that unless the wreck of Kiowa was removed within 30 days it would be destroyed by the United States government. Another company stepped in at the end of July in an attempt to remove as much cargo as possible, and was able to clear one of the hatches and pull out some of the steamer's cargo, but all attempts to raise the vessel did not succeed. The vessel was finally abandoned on August 31, and on September 8 the Boston Towboat company, who made the original attempt to remove the cargo and raise the ship, started preparations for blowing up the wreck. On September 19 it was reported that the deck was blown up and approximately 50,000 feet of lumber was secured from the steamer's hold.
