= Rodt (Loßburg) =

Coordinates: 48.4168°N 08.4444°E

Rodt is a village and a former municipality in Loßburg (Lossburg) in the district of Freudenstadt in Baden-Württemberg, Germany.

== History ==
In 1319 Albrecht von Ehningen sold Rodt (then called "Rode"), with stewardship and appurtenances ("Vogtei und Zubehör") as well as the meadowland ("Brühl") near Loßburg (i.e., the castle meadows), to the Lords of Neuneck zu Glatt. With the woodland of the Vogt (Vogteiwald) of Reichenbach Priory, the village had a significantly larger territory than Loßburg. The Burgstall (abandoned castle site) in Steinbühl indicates that the settlement is much older. (See "Fortifications" below.)

In 1514, as in the lordship of Loßburg, the peasants in Rodt revolted and joined the peasant uprising of the "Poor Konrad" leagues. Hans Schneck, Valentin Ungemach and Balthasar Schauder, all three "seated in the Rode", were imprisoned in Glatt Castle and had to swear an Urfehde (an agreement not to feud) on 13 October 1514. After that, they were released, but had to pay a fine of 21 guilders. A week earlier, Heinrich Wiest and Jacob Brunner had been released from captivity; Wiest was expelled from the country for his activities. The captures and the conditions of release (signature of an Urfehde) took place without a court ruling: the relatives of the accused often pushed for an Urfehde, as a court ruling would usually have been much stricter.

In 1601, Duke Frederick of Württemberg acquired the village of Rodt from Wildhans von Neuneck zu Dettensee and it became the first constituent part of the Amt of the newly-founded Freudenstadt. In 1619, the then Duke of Württemberg sold the entire estate to 16 citizens of Rodt, thus finally ending the old dominance of the castle at Rodt.

However, boundary disputes between the lords of Glatt and the lords of Loßburg continued, especially because of the right to graze, until 1728, when Rodt and Loßburg finally reached an amicable agreement largely to Rodt's benefit. The people of Rodt had special privileges in the Reichenbach Vogteiwald. However, the people of Loßburg were allowed to cut wood for their own needs after obtaining permission.

In 1938, the district administrator and Kreisleiter (district leader) of the Nazi Party completed the incorporation of Rodt into the municipality of Loßburg.

In 1991, traces of mining on the territory of Rodt were discovered on the Lauter. The former shaft must be older than the one in Wittendorf (another part of Loßburg).

== Fortifications ==
A fortification, a so-called "lowland castle", is known from the early or high medieval period in Steinbühl near the cart track, later called a Burgstall (i.e., the site of an abandoned castle with no discernible ruins). Below the cart track a neck ditch is still visible.

At the Schlossgässle on the hill of Rodt, the lords of Neuneck zu Glatt built a castle. At that time, it was located on an important thoroughfare from Alpirsbach via Schömberg and Ödenwald (called Dornstetter Steige near the sand meadow) to Rodt and from there via the cart track to Dornstetten. A detailed description of the village and its territory exists, dating from 1483.

== Religion ==
After the introduction of the Reformation in the lordship of Loßburg (completed in 1538), the people of Rodt wanted to remain Catholic. However, since they were still obliged to pay dues to the now-Protestant parish of Lombach, the citizens of Rodt lacked the money for the maintenance of their own Catholic pastor. It was not until 1574, after decades of dispute with the Catholic lord of Rodt, Heinrich von Neuneck, and the Rodt farmers that the Duke of Württemberg granted 20 guilders a year for the maintenance of a Catholic clergyman. For that salary, the priest from Leinstetten read a mass every second or third Sunday in the Jakobskirche in Rodt. On the other Sundays, the people of Rodt attended the Protestant service in Loßburg. The dead were buried in the graveyard in Loßburg, but the people of Rodt had their children baptized in the Protestant church of Lombach.

After Rodt was acquired by Duke Frederick of Württemberg in 1601 and became the first constituent part of the Amt of Freudenstadt, Rodt was incorporated into the Protestant parish of Lombach. This should not have caused any difficult for the people of Rodt, as they had long been taking part in Protestant worship in Loßburg.

Before World War I Kommerzienrat Breuninger from Stuttgart, who at this period owned the Hohenrodt estate and had a holiday home here for his servants, planned a parish hall with a prayer room and a kindergarten, because the chapel in Rodt was in poor condition, but the war delayed construction. However, on September 4, 1921, the new parish hall was inaugurated. In 1931–32 the derelict chapel, the Jakobuskirchlein, was demolished.

== Transport ==
The railway stop "Loßburg-Rodt" on the Eutingen im Gäu–Freudenstadt railway is in Rodt.

== Bibliography ==
- Paulus, Karl Eduard. "Beschreibung des Oberamts Freudenstadt/Kapitel B 31".
- Hans Saile: Loßburger Hefte. Nr. 1: Kirchengeschichte von Lombach – Loßburg – Rodt. Freudenstadt 1995.
- Hans Saile: Loßburger Hefte. Nr. 5, Geschichtlicher Abriss von Loßburg und seinen Teilorten. Freudenstadt 1999, pp. 62–72.
- Hans Saile: Loßburger Hefte. Nr. 9, Grenzsteine und Flurnamen von Loßburg und seinen Teilorten. Freudenstadt 2004, pp. 67–82.
