= Hans Ekstrand =

German politician (1903–1969)

Member of the Bundestag
- In office 7 September 1949 – 7 September 1953

Personal details
- Born: 27 December 1903 Hamburg
- Died: 5 March 1969 (aged 65)
- Party: SPD

Hans Ekstrand (27 December 1903 – 5 March 1969) was a German politician of the Social Democratic Party (SPD) and member of the German Bundestag.

== Life ==
In the Stormarn constituency, he was elected to the Bundestag in the 1949 federal elections. He became a full member of the committees for foreign trade issues, for food, agriculture and forestry and for social policy. He also ran in the federal elections from 1953 to 1961, but did not get back into parliament. The Schleswig-Holstein state parliament elected him a member of the second Federal Assembly, which re-elected Theodor Heuss as Federal President in 1954.

== Literature ==
Herbst, Ludolf; Jahn, Bruno (2002). Vierhaus, Rudolf (ed.). Biographisches Handbuch der Mitglieder des Deutschen Bundestages. 1949–2002 [Biographical Handbook of the Members of the German Bundestag. 1949–2002] (in German). München: De Gruyter - De Gruyter Saur. p. 1715. ISBN 978-3-11-184511-1.
