= Sunswick Creek =

Buried stream in Queens, New York

Coordinates: 40°46′07″N 73°56′16″W

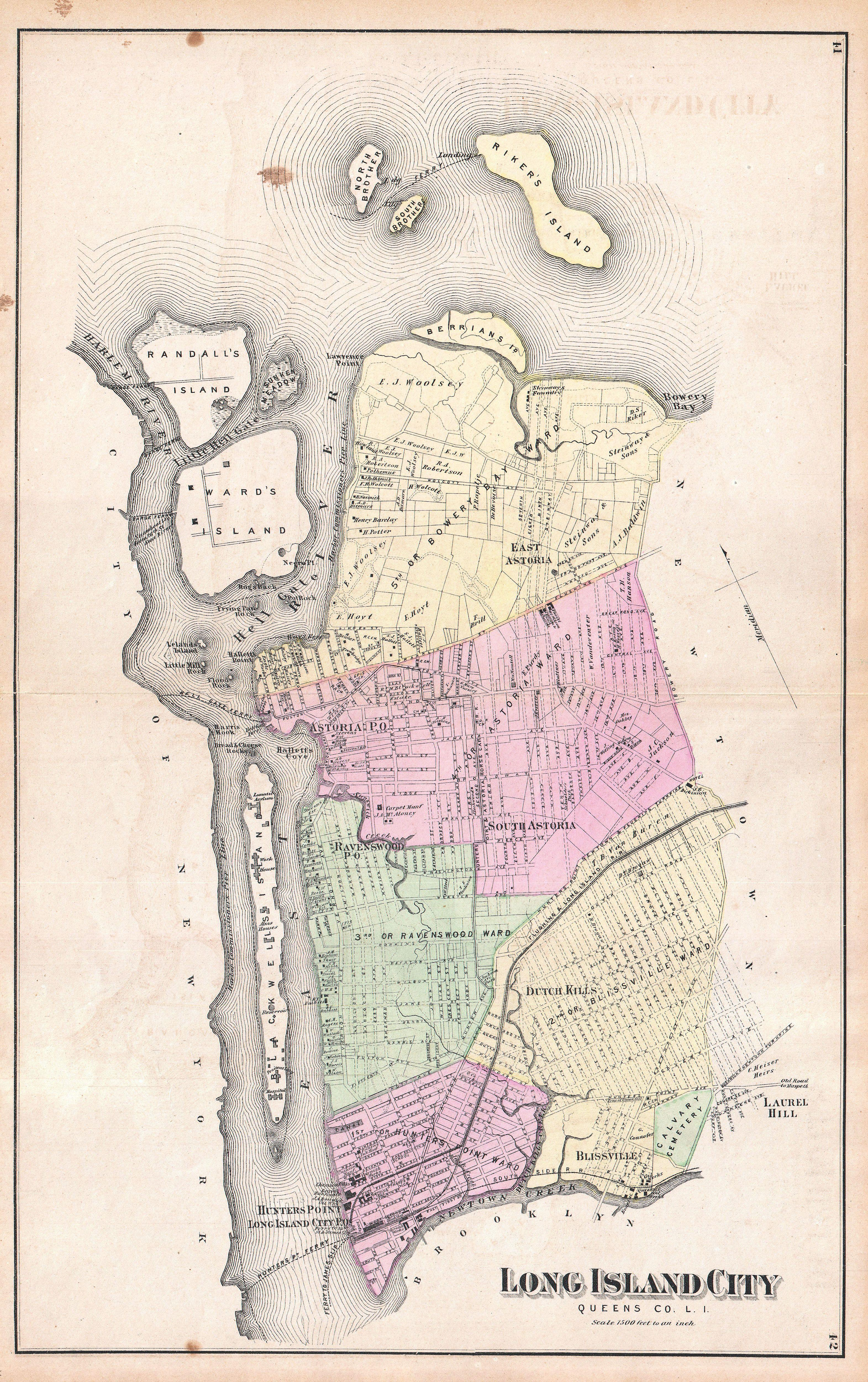
1873 map of Long Island City. Sunswick Creek starts at the center of the image and drains into the East River, at left

Sunswick Creek is a buried stream located in Astoria and Long Island City, in the northwestern portion of Queens in New York City. It originated to the north of Queensboro Bridge and Queens Plaza in Long Island City, flowing north to the present-day site of the Socrates Sculpture Park in Astoria, and emptying into the East River. The creek was named for a term in the Algonquin language that likely means "Woman Chief" or "Sachem’s Wife."

The mouth of the creek was settled in the late 17th century by William Hallet and Elizabeth Fones, who built a milldam at the creek's mouth to create a mill pond. Due to industrialization in Long Island City, the creek became heavily polluted and was covered-over starting in the late 19th century.

== Course ==
Prior to its burial, Sunswick Creek's source was located close to 21st Street north of what is now the Queensboro Bridge and Queens Plaza, within the Long Island City subsection of Ravenswood. The creek passed north near the current site of the Queensbridge Houses and the Ravenswood Generating Station, roughly following the present path of 21st Street. A large city block, now the site of the Long Island City High School, marks the former above-ground course of the creek. Sunswick Creek drained into the East River near the present Socrates Sculpture Park in Astoria.

== Etymology ==
The term "Sunswick" was a neighborhood name formerly applied to the surrounding portions of Ravenswood and Astoria. It is believed to have originated from a Native American language, possibly the Algonquin word "Sunkisq." The Greater Astoria Historical Society defines the term as "meaning perhaps 'Woman Chief' or 'Sachem’s Wife.'" This name is shared by Sunswick 3535, a bar at the intersection of 35th Street and 35th Avenue. Additionally, the present-day 22nd Street was formerly named Sunswick Street.

== History ==
=== 17th through 19th centuries ===
In 1664, the land on the northern shore of the creek's mouth was purchased by British settler William Hallet (or Hallett), who obtained the plot from two native chiefs named Shawestcont and Erramorhar. This peninsula, which jutted out onto Hell Gate to the northwest, was acquired in portions and was later renamed Hallet's Cove. Hallet subsequently built a lime kiln on the creek. Sunswick Creek formed a navigable waterway with Dutch Kills, another stream to the south, making it easy for merchants to transport produce and goods along the creek. A milldam was built at the mouth of the creek in 1679, creating a small mill pond. Joseph Hallett and Jacob Blackwell built a mill on the creek's right bank, near its mouth, in 1753.

By the 1860s and 1870s, Sunswick Creek was heavily polluted due to increasing industrialization, a lack of proper sewerage, and the high population density of Long Island City and Astoria. The historian Vincent F. Seyfried wrote that disease around Sunswick Creek and Dutch Kills had become common by 1866, and that "The damming of the Sunswick Creek cut off the flushing-out of the meadow lands and the salt water that used to ebb and flow became stagnant and slimy and filled with mosquitoes." After outbreaks of disease in 1871 and 1875, the marshes surrounding the creek were drained in 1879. In addition, Long Island City had started building a proper sewage system in the 1870s, which was still not complete by the time Long Island City became part of the City of Greater New York in 1898. The creek was partially diverted into one of the sewage system's brick tunnels at Broadway, which was completed around 1893.

=== 20th century ===
After the consolidation of Queens into New York City, Sunswick Meadows, a lowland north of the present Queensboro Bridge, was infilled with the construction of the bridge in the 1900s and 1910s. This was accomplished partly by dumping dirt from the excavation of New York City Subway tunnels in Manhattan. In addition, street cleaners tossed dry rubbish into the lowland to raise the grade of nearby streets.

In 1915, residents of Ravenswood sent a letter to the New York City Board of Health to complain about the tide gates along Sunswick Creek, which had been installed to alleviate an infestation of mosquitoes. The residents claimed that the tide gates were actually keeping mosquitoes in the creek, since these gates resulted in stagnant water, and threatened to open the tide gates. In response, the Board of Health suggested filling up their land, which the Brooklyn Times-Union reported would require the infilling of 6 acres (2.4 ha) to a depth of 8 to 10 feet (2.4 to 3.0 m). The operation had a projected total cost of over $100,000 (equivalent to $3,108,224 in 2024), which was not affordable for most of the neighborhood's residents. Early the next year, in April 1916, residents broke down the barriers with axes. Afterward, the New York City health commissioner told a local newspaper that the residents "prefer to live like hogs," prompting outrage from local residents. Afterward, the Queens borough president, Maurice E. Connolly, announced a plan to install two tide gates on the creek.

By the end of 1916, the New York City government proposed to close up Sunswick Creek, mandating that households living nearby divert their sewage elsewhere. A 1920 Brooklyn Daily Eagle article stated that the former path of the creek had been mostly developed with industrial buildings. During excavations for a sewer line at Vernon Boulevard and Broadway in 1957, construction workers found remnants of the former grist mill on the creek's mouth.

== Legacy ==
The creek was relocated underground as part of a sewage tunnel, which was documented online by urban explorer Steven Duncan. According to one blogger, during heavy rains, the creek could be heard near the Sohmer and Company Piano Factory, across from Socrates Sculpture Park. In 2011 and 2012, the Socrates Sculpture Park and Noguchi Museum commissioned a work from artist Mary Miss, entitled Ravenswood/CaLL, which consisted of several signs and mirrors along the course of the creek.
