= First Reformed Church of Astoria =

Church in Queens, New York

Coordinates: 40.772987°N 73.930165°W

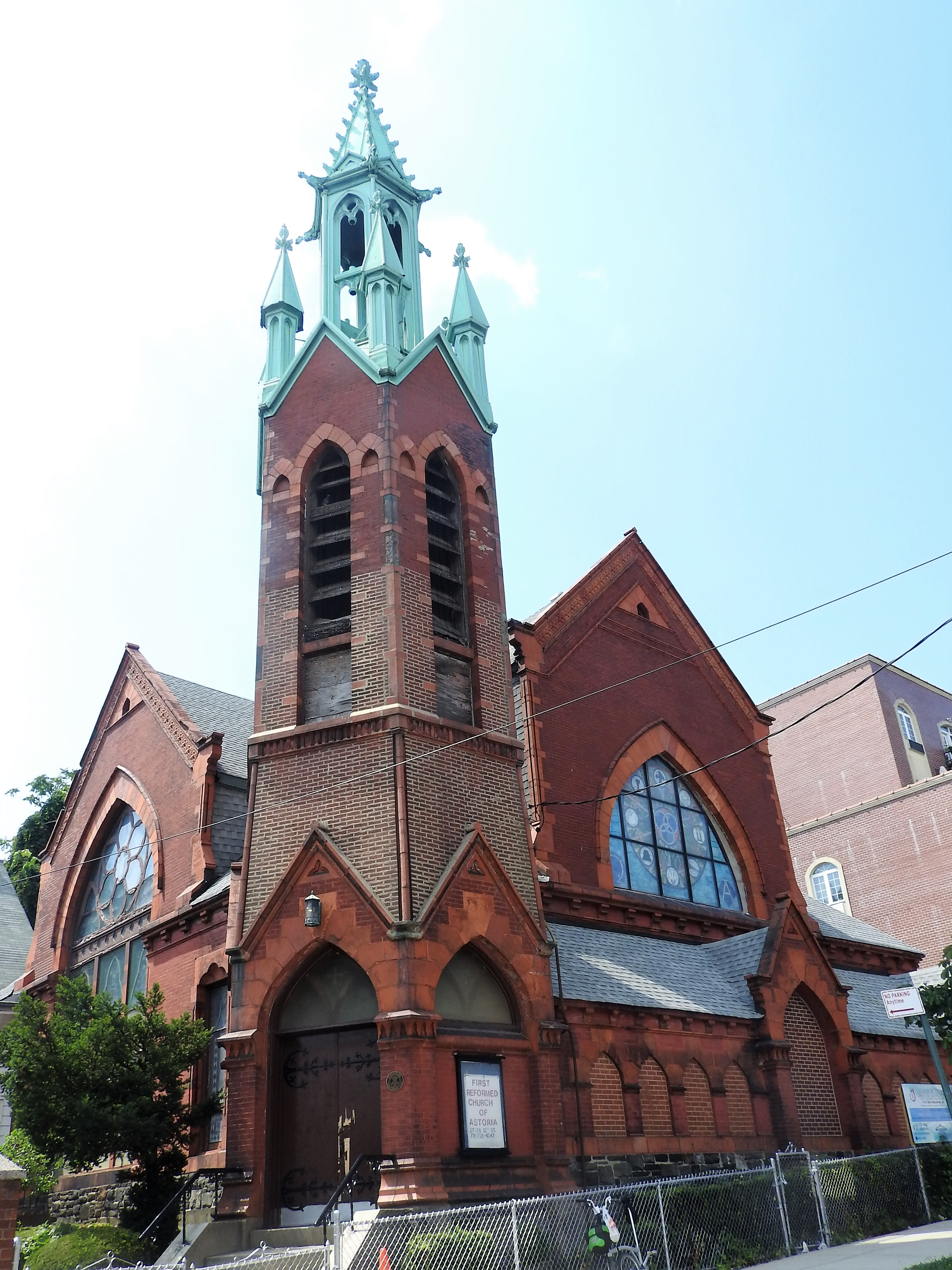
- First Reformed Church from 12th Street
- First Reformed Church of Astoria
- Location: 27-26 12th Street, Astoria, New York

Architecture
- Years built: 1839

First Reformed Church of Astoria was organized and established in 1839. It continued to operate, both as a church and as a center for family and holiday-oriented events, until 2023. However, in-person church services have not been held at the church since the beginning of the COVID pandemic, and by 2025 the building had been abandoned to disrepair. In April 2026, a fire in the rectory spread to the church, leading to its partial collapse and subsequent demolition.

== History ==
Although most history behind this church is still unclear, the First Reformed Church of Astoria was organized and established in 1839. According to information within the "Guide to the First Reformed Church of Astoria," the area in which the Church was built was known as Hallet's Cove, prior to 1839. The church itself was originally called the Reformed Protestant Dutch Church of the Village of Astoria. The earliest pastors of this church included the Rev. Alexander Hamilton Bishop, Rev. William H. Ten Eyck, and Rev. Matthias L. Haines.

Local rumors held that Stephen A. Halsey, the wealthy fur trader who established Astoria, was buried behind the First Reformed Church after his death in 1875. In 2001, a six-foot long obelisk was uncovered by congregants clearing overgrowth to plant a sunflower garden, which locals speculated could have been Halsey's grave marker. However, concerns about damage to the church grounds delayed any decision to unearth the obelisk in search of an inscription.

According to the 1939 article "Old Reformed Church in Astoria Plans For Its 100th Anniversary", the First Reformed Church of Astoria, once fashionable and prosperous, "felt the pangs of a change in character of the neighborhood a decade or more ago" due to a significant decrease or reduction of its members. The Church, in conjunction with 100th Anniversary, was scheduled to re-open and regain its popularity in May 1939, under the spiritual leadership of the Reverend Alfred R. Winham. This article further notes how the church had deteriorated considerably and required improvements, with extensive repairs halted or prevented due to limited financial resources. However, the pastor, assisted by a group of staunch supporters, undertook the task of repairing and re-shaping the edifice roof. The work for this project began under the supervision of Louis J. Falvie. This program included the installation of new copper flushings and gutters. Harry Glover was one church member in a group of 12 who assisted in this project.

On September 11, 1966, Sherwin D. Weener was ordained and bestowed as the new pastor of the First Reformed Church of Astoria. This service was joined by pastors of the First Reformed Church of Long Island City, the Steinway Reformed Church, and the Second Reformed Church of Astoria.

In the Fall of 1986, parishioners celebrated the 150th anniversary (150 years after the cornerstone was laid) with special services and guest appearances by two former pastors. This anniversary brought back the Rev. Kenneth Tenckinck, who was pastor from 1970 to 1984 and the Rev. Sherwin Weener, who served from 1965 to 1970, along with several other ministers. The church, although devastated by fire and damaged by lightning, has been preserved.

On April 23, 2026, the church suffered a five-alarm fire, causing a collapse of its roof and minor injuries to six responding firefighters. The fire began around 6:45 in the evening in the church's rectory, before spreading to the church proper. According to neighbors and a local historian, the church had at that point been unused for about a year. The remaining structure was demolished that May.

== Outreach and community service ==
Astoria's First Reformed Church hosted a trilogy of special evangelistic services in 1962, which were spread over three nights: distinguished church leaders attended the events as guest speakers. The Rev. Victor Bucci orchestrated/prepared that Tuesday, June 26, as Children's Night in which his church's children choir sang and play-acted a song of the Good Samaritan. On Wednesday, June 27, Youth Night was held; during this event, Bill Reynolds, popular song leaders from Levittown Reformed Church played with his guitar, while the member of the host church's youth choir offered a medley of spirituals and the Youth Choir of Steinway Reformed Church of Astoria presented a program in its turn. And Thursday, June 28, was scheduled as Family Night, in which the senior choir led the singing.

The church of the First Reformed Church of Astoria launched a project called "Operation Kids." The church itself was situated on 12th Street near Astoria in a high-delinquency area. This was drawn up by Bucci, who hoped to "modernize and expand present facilities to keep youngsters busy, and ... out of trouble".Bucci stated, in description of the project, "The building we use adjoining the church is really a makeshift facility" and "hrdly adequate for the work we are doing and hope to do. It's over 70 years old and is literally falling apart at the seams." Furthermore, Bucci stated that even though the facilities seemed dangerous, "it's a choice of either leaving the kids outside on their own or taking them in here and off the streets." Protestant, Catholic, and Jewish youngsters (many from the Astoria Housing Project) crowded into the structure adjoining the church. Bucci stated Operation Kids would have allowed the church to serve wholesome needs of the community in many consecutive ways; he went on to say "It means that we can expand our completely inter-racial fellowship and rededicate ourselves to the true welfare of all around us. The project required $25,000 in funding.

== Baptisms ==
According to the "Baptismal Register and Membership Register, 1840–1892" in the record entitled "Baptisms: Protestant Reformed Dutch Church of Astoria, L. I.", there were a large number of individuals who were baptized within the First Reformed Church of Astoria; these records can be found within the First Reformed Church of Astoria Records. One of the earliest baptisms that occurred was that of Isabella McConnel, the daughter of Thomas and Mary McConnel, born May 17, 1840, and baptized June 21 of that same year. The daughters of Frederick Lancashire and his wife Elizabeth Pearsall were Ida Elizabeth (born August 10, 1852) and Myra Amelia (born April 22, 1854); both daughters were baptized on January 13, 1854. These names were a few of the many listed under "Records of Baptisms Reformed Church of Astoria" who were baptized by under Ministry of Rev. William H. Ten Eyck. Furthermore, there were baptisms that were bestowed under the ministry and direction of Rev. Matthias L. Haines. For example, Jennie Elgora Pattison, born to Charles/Chas. S. Pattison and Ellen F. Bressey on March 2, 1861, was baptized on July 11, 1874. Additionally, two of Henry S. Crawford's and Elisa S. Mallony's children were Edward Chauncey and Henry Sheen, both of whom were born on April 1, 1873, and baptized on June 11, 1876. One last example of baptisms that occurred within the First Reformed Church of Astoria was that of Christina Evalina, born to Thios McKion and Rebecca Patton on December 25, 1877 and baptized on June 9, 1978.

== Marriages ==
In the "Marriage Records of Reformed Dutch Church of Astoria, Long Island," the First Reformed Church of Astoria was also a significant center for marriage ceremonies. December 16, 1869, marked the marriage of Jesse A. Ellsworth to Phebe Jane Uesserole. For instance, December 16, 1860, marked the marriage of Jesse A. Ellsworth to Phebe Jane Uesserole. Furthermore, several of the founding pastors performed marriage ceremonies within different years: Rev. Haines performed marriages from 1875 to 1885, while Rev. William Stackton Granmer performed marriages from 1885 to 1892. For example, according to the chart/list entitled "Marriages Under the Pastorate of Rev. Matt. L. Haines", Rev. Haines performed the marriage of James William Babcook and Emma E. Merritt on October 31, 1877, with Alfred James Merritt as one of the witnesses. One November 26, 1890, Rev. Granmer married Chas Mayhew Phinny to Anna Aleda Smith.

== Obituaries ==
The First Reformed Church of Astoria was also a place in which funerals were held for the deceased residents of Jamaica. According to an Obituary found within the First Reformed Church of Astoria Records in Central Library, one such person whose funeral was held at the First Reformed Church of Astoria was Cornelius Rapelye, a lifelong and highly respected resident of Astoria. This man was born in the winter residence of the Rapelye Family in the year of 1833. He died at the age of 57 (the same age of his father when he died) on November 20, 1896. The cause of Rapelye's death was a painful ailment he suffered from for some time and he submitted to an operation on the Monday of November 17, 1896, to receive some relief; however, despite everything Professor Wright of New York, along with Doctors Taylor, Trask and Fitch of Astoria, did to save him, Rapelye died on the following Thursday morning.

The funeral services were held at the First Reformed Church of Astoria on Monday, November 24, 1896. A throng of sincere mourners, both rich and poor class, filled the church to pay tribute his memory. The choir was composed of Rapelye's personal friends who were reported to have sung in a very emotional manner.
