= The Cadillac Man =

American journalist

The Cadillac Man is the pen name of a homeless white American writer who lived under the railroad viaduct in Astoria, Queens, New York City. His book Land of the Lost Souls: My Life on the Streets describes his experiences living on the streets. His notebooks have been excerpted in Esquire Magazine, and his writings on street life have appeared in The New York Times. A 2006 documentary about him, Cadillac Man: My Life Under The Viaduct, has appeared in 14 film festivals. In December 2015, he moved into an apartment in Astoria.

== Nickname ==
Cadillac Man does not publicly state his name, but says his nickname comes from being hit by Cadillac cars on different occasions in 1994.

== Published works ==
- Cadillac Man (2009). Land of the Lost Souls: My life on the Streets. Bloomsbury USA. March 17, 2009. ISBN 978-1-59691-406-3

== See also ==
- Hell's Kitchen, Manhattan
