= Sohmer and Company Piano Factory =

- U.S. National Register of Historic Places
- New York City Landmark
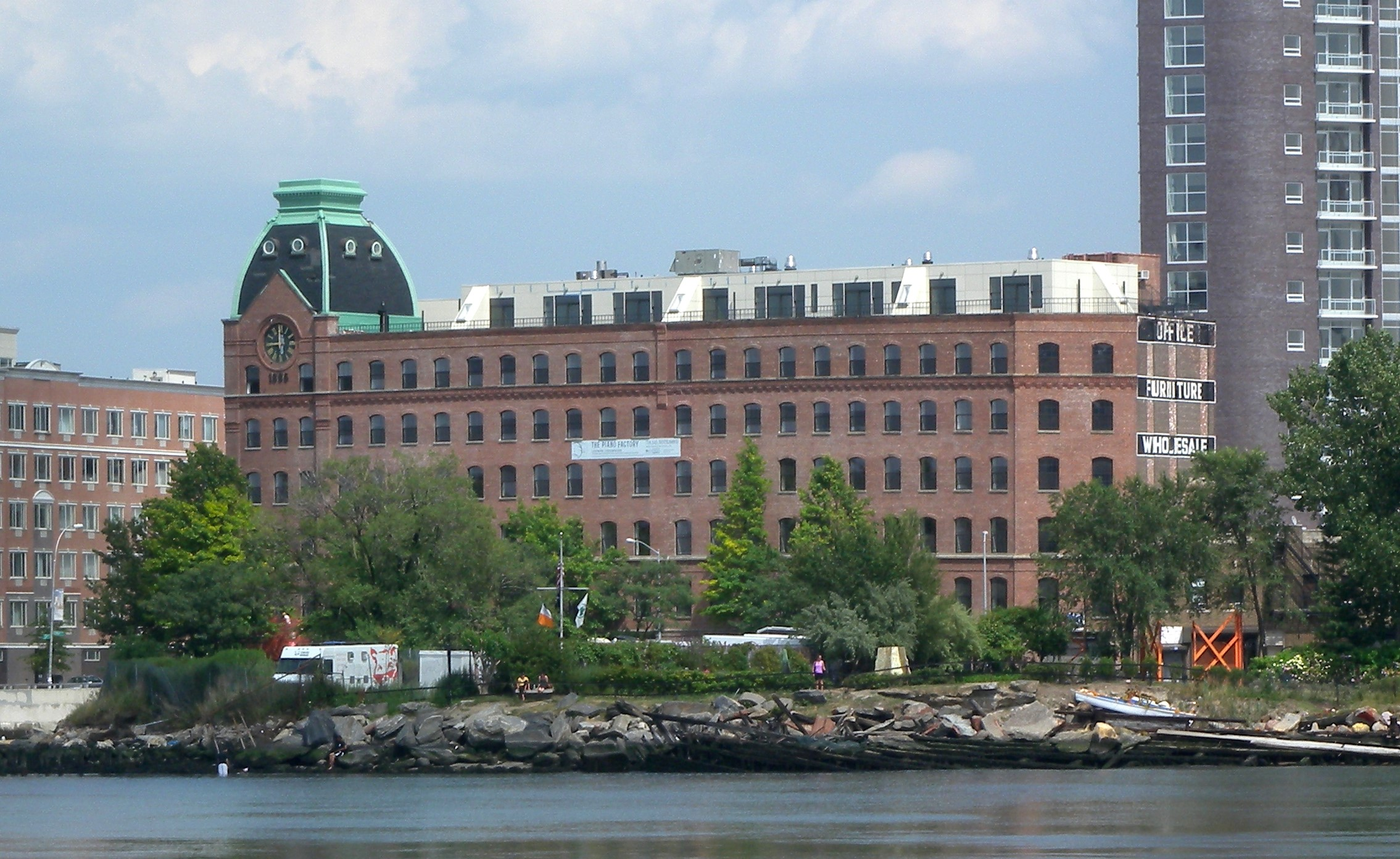
- Sohmer and Company Piano Factory, June 2010
- Location: 31-01 Vernon Blvd. Astoria, Queens, New York City
- Coordinates: 40°46′10″N 73°56′07″W
- Area: 0.48 acres (0.19 ha)
- Built: 1886, c. 1906–1907
- Architect: Berger & Baylies
- Architectural style: Rundbogenstil, Romanesque Revival
- NRHP reference No.: 14000007
- NYCL No.: 2172

Significant dates
- Added to NRHP: February 14, 2014
- Designated NYCL: February 27, 2007

Sohmer and Company Piano Factory is a historic piano factory located in the Astoria neighborhood of Queens, New York City. It was built in 1886 by Sohmer & Co., and is a six-story, L-shaped, Rundbogenstil / Romanesque Revival style brick building. The corner features a clock tower with a copper trimmed mansard roof. The building was expanded about 1906–1907. It was converted to residential usage starting in 2007.

The building was designated as a New York City individual landmark in 2007 for its role in the history of New York City's piano manufacturing industry. It was listed on the National Register of Historic Places in 2014.

== History ==
Hugo Sohmer, founder of Sohmer & Co., relocated his manufacturing premises from 149 East 14th Street in 1886 after building a new building on the Astoria coast of the East River. The company was moved to be closer to better shipping facilities and in order to be more accessible for the labor force in charge of operating the production. He had founded the company a few years earlier in 1872 together with his partner Joseph Kuder from Vienna, who was also a former Steinway and Sons employee. The new building of Sohmer & Co. was designed by Berger & Baylies architecture firm. Entering in piano building business in NY in the end of 19th century was not a hard thing to do as there were many skilled emigrants coming from Europe (mostly Germany) and the demand for the instrument was growing fast. The building was expanded by Baylies & Co. architecture firm in 1906–07. In 1925, the factory was an impressive 210,000 square feet piece of property and the company employed 275 people who were responsible for producing 2,500 pianos a year. The company was family owned and operated for much of its existence; the Sohmer family had nearly 70 years of combined experience in the piano business. Their products included a grand piano, uprights, and a player piano, but their uprights were specifically admired for having a more powerful sound than competing pianos on the market. Additionally, the Sohmer Grands came in four sizes: Concert, Parlor, Baby, and Cupid. The factory was highly regarded because of its state of the art facilities and equipment. In the time of the Great Depression parts of the building were leased out to other manufacturers. However, the company survived the Great Depression, but after the collapse of piano industry, Sohmer's production rates fell. By 1960, the factory had an assessed value of $255,000 and a heavily decreased labor force of 120 people. The factory maintained production in its Astoria factory until 1982 when the grand son of Hugo Sohmer sold the company to Pratt-Read company – producers of piano pieces and furniture. The plant was then relocated to Ivoryton, Connecticut, and the building sold to Adirondack Chair Company. Between 2007 and 2013, the building was converted for residential use with new penthouse additions above the sixth floor. Currently Sohmer pianos are produced in Korea. Several photographs of the factory have been made available online by the Queens Public Library, including a view from 1945 from across the East River.

=== Piano building tradition in New York ===
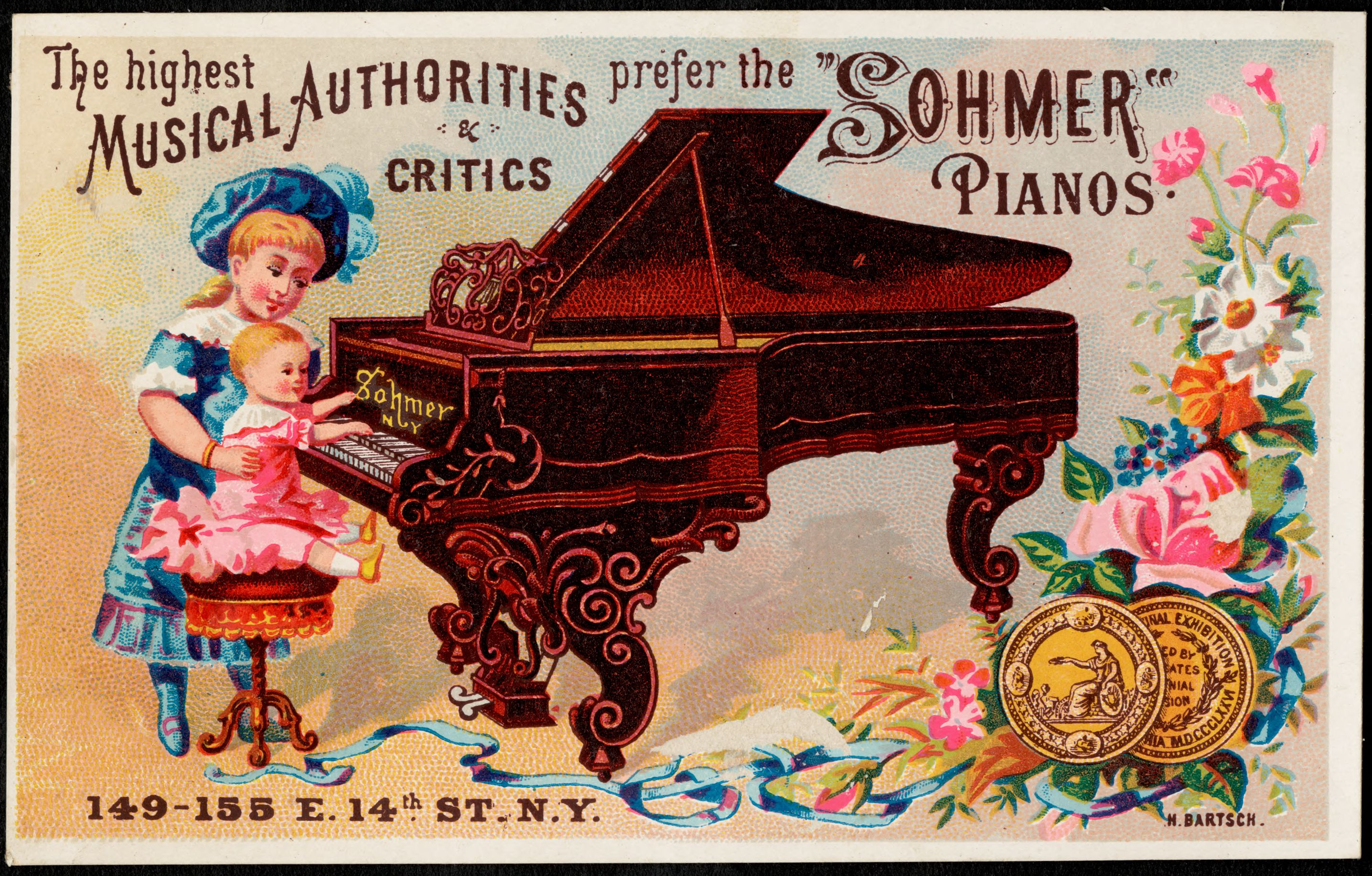
The highest musical authorities & critics prefer the "Sohmer" pianos, ca. 1870–1900; from the 19th Century American Trade Cards collection of the Boston Public Library

There were almost no pianos in the US until 1771 when Thomas Jefferson required a forte piano ordered to him from Europe. That triggered larger trend among wealthy Americans to purchase the instrument. In less than 10 years there were already few local piano manufacturers in Philadelphia and New York. However pianos remained rare instruments and as estimated in 1790s there were only 26 pianos in Boston all of which were made in London. In the first third of the 18th century Boston was leading American piano manufacturing center, but it was soon outraced by Philadelphia, nearly followed by New York. By the 1840s New York started to gain its national importance as center of culture and commerce. But only after the wave of German immigrants who arrived in 1850s the city became leading piano building center in America. The most notable German immigrant probably was Heinrich E. Steinweg (later he changed his name to Steinway and his name became the synonym to the instrument). Among them also Hugo Sohmer arrived in the US in 1863. In these years piano building took off in New York. Soon piano was the second most household appliance after kitchen.

In the turn of the century piano experienced boom age. It was an important household part of a middle class Americans. There was a widespread belief that it helped to "cultivate the women" of its age. Consequently, it was played by mostly females. In 1870 there were 1 piano in every 1540 Americans, but in 1910 there were already 1 piano in every 252 Americans. This shows the great development speed of the industry. New York was by far the greatest piano building center in the US with ~170 of total 270 US piano factories located there. However, by 1924 the industry fell apart mostly due wide spreading of much cheaper and smaller radios. Radio industry rose from around 190 000 in 1923 to almost 5 million in 1929. In the same time American piano industry shrank from 160 to 36. Nowadays there is only one major piano factory in NYC – Steinway and Sons and several antique piano restoration workshops.

== Architecture ==
This building is one of the most prominent in the coast of Astoria on the East River. The building is specially distinguished by its mansard roofed clock tower over the top of its impressive scale. Designed by Berger & Baylies architecture firm this 6 story L-shaped factory building was a typical wealthy factory of New York' s piano manufacturing scene. It is built in red bricks and designed in German Romanesque Revival Style or Rundbogenstil. Characteristic to this style was the usage of curved edges and surfaces on the roof. Thus segmentally-arched brick lintels. Band courses surmount the first, second and fifth floors.

This factory building is one of the few surviving factories in Queens. It represents many characteristics of 19th century factory building, typically to the age these principles were always rooted in functionality and practical needs. According to architecture historian Betsy Hunter Bradly "the aesthetic bases of American Industrial building design was an ideal of beauty based on function, utility and process".

Basic characteristics of Sohmer factory – its narrow width and L-shaped plan was due to the need for natural light as the factory was built before the advent of electric lighting. The need for good light for the interior dictated the narrow shape of the floor plan, but the land plot size did not let to build it in I-shaped formation. thus L-shape was chosen. Often factory buildings were in I, L, U, H, E configurations. Flat roofs were also a practical need for a factory. They were mostly used after 1860s. It was due to the fire safety. Flat roofs let to eliminate the attic space – a place that could get dusty and easily catch on fire. Bricks were used for factory walls because they were the most fire resistant material. Brick work decorations was a popular method of livening up large wall surfaces – displaying dogtoothing, recessed panels, channeling, pilasters, corbelling were among most popular forms of decorative brickwork.

Positioning the building on the edge of the street let the owners of the factory preserve larger back side space away from public eyes, thus buildings well organized and regular facade was the only public face of the company. The physical aesthetics played important role in marketing the company. Factory's image was used on letterheads, catalogs, business directories and in advertisements. Typically they were bird's eye views of the factory with smoke coming out of the chimneys thus rendering image of energy, dynamics and organization of the work.

The building's prominent location on the river front also served as an attraction of new customers. It was seen from long distances, even from across the East River. As the Sohmers were producing product for popular consumption it was important that his factory was seen by as many people as possible, thus this location served not only as a display for inhabitants of Manhattan, but also those who passed by on the boats. The building served excellent as an eye catcher because of its scale and proportions. But the most focal point of the building of course remained the clock tower elevating above the 2 wings of the factory. This clock tower remains the most significant feature of the building. It is also most elaborately decorated part of the building. Mansard roof with curved dome is covered with decorations expressing this as the most focal part of the building. From the corner side the building was seen the best thus architects have chosen to express this part of it the most. For factories usually most decorated parts were entrances and clock towers.

The clock towers had their roots in cupolas of New England Mills. Clocks organized the daily lives of local community. It was long before the affordable watch had made its first appearance, when need for strictly organized daily rhythm was established. By late nineteenth century clock was one of the main tool to organize the daily lives of New Yorkers. Living synchronized was becoming a necessity. They delivered this function to the network of public clock towers, factory whistles and bells. But clock tower was more than that. it was also a fire sealed staircase for factory that prevented the fires to spread vertically in the building. Thus tower was not only aesthetically most prominent place in the factory, but also most socially important and functional one.

== Architects ==
The architecture firm in their short existence run by Bruno W. Berger and Franklin Baylies designed many commercial and residential buildings around New York. Bruno W. Berger had previously worked with several other partners, whereas Franklin Baylies had just started his career. The firm was established in the beginning of 1880s, but exact year is unknown. That includes several warehouses and store-and-loft buildings in Tribeca and around its historical district. Firm mostly designed in neo-Grec style, thus the Rundbogenstil Sohmer piano factory building was unusual for them. However, it was their largest assignment. In 1890 both architects established their own practices and Berger & Baylies ceased to exist. It is believed that the extension of Sohmer factory in 1906-7 was assigned to Franklin Baylies' firm.

== See also ==
- List of New York City Designated Landmarks in Queens
- National Register of Historic Places listings in Queens County, New York
