= Stephen A. Halsey =

American fur trader (1798–1875)

- Born: 1798
- Died: May 5, 1875 (aged 77); Astoria, Queens, New York, U.S.
- Other name: George Washington of Astoria
- Occupation: Fur trader
- Known for: Founding and developing Astoria, New York

Stephen A. Halsey (1798–1875) was an American fur trader who bought much of the lands along the East River of New York, called the "Hallet Cove". It was the area where Halsey established Astoria, which was named for the fur trader John Jacob Astor. Halsey chose this namesake because he wanted to encourage Astor to live there, however, there was no known record that Astor chose to stay. Astor's only contribution to Astoria was $500 donation to a seminary.

Halsey was generally regarded as the "George Washington of Astoria", and provided much to develop the community such as planning city infrastructure and organization, he created public institutions like churches, stores, schools and modern factories, as well as encouraging settlers to move into the community.

Halsey died in Astoria on May 5, 1875, aged 77.

== Present ==
Currently there is much speculation over where Halsey's grave lies. A discovery at the First Reformed Church of Astoria by congregational members of an obelisk with an inscription sparked renewed interest in the search for Halsey's grave. However, despite this major discovery there is much hesitation in unearthing this obelisk as there is no way to confirm if it was Halsey's grave and concerns over causing damages to the church's yard.
