= Frank Bonsangue =

American actor

- Born: Astoria, Queens, New York, United States
- Other name: Frankie the Butcher
- Occupations: Actor, television personality
- Years active: 1995–present
- Spouse: Rose Bonsangue (?–Present)
- Children: Tina Bonsangue
- Website: http://www.frankiethebutcher.com/

Frank "Frankie Butcher" Bonsangue is an American film, stage and television actor. He is also a television personality on several cooking shows including the Food Network's "Hot off the Grill Show with Bobby Flay". He has appeared in Spider-Man 2, Analyze That and Law & Order.

== Early life ==
Frank was born in Astoria, Queens, New York.

== Career ==
Before turning to acting, Bonsangue worked in the food business at his family-owned meat market in Greenwich Village, then at the Waldorf Astoria Hotel. He has studied acting at the Stella Adler Acting Conservatory, the Michael Howard Studios and the Young Actors Workshop.

He voiced Phil Bell in the video game Grand Theft Auto IV.
