= Astoria, Queens =

Neighborhood in New York City

Astoria
- Neighborhood
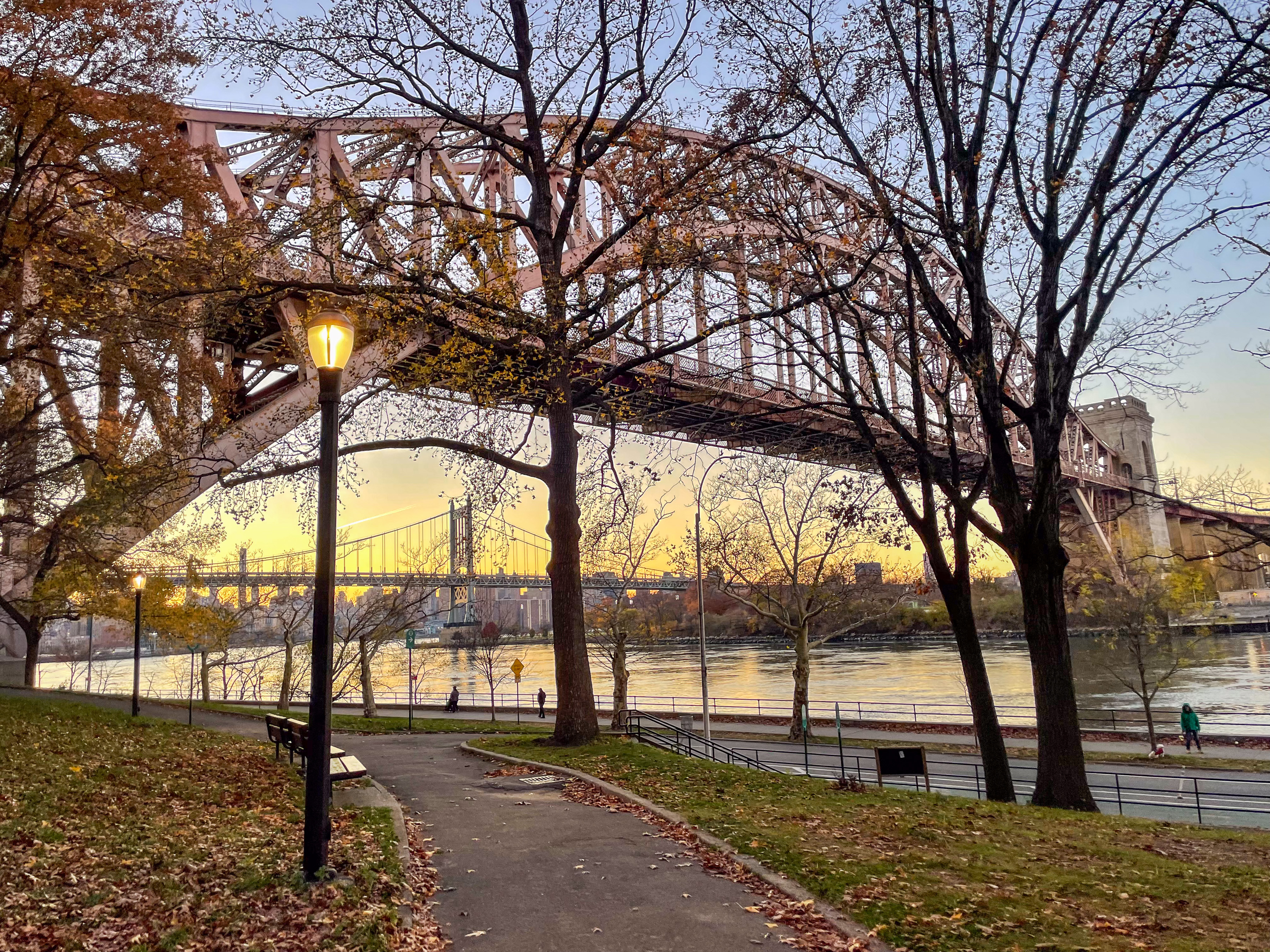
- Astoria Park and the East River
- Interactive map of Astoria
- Coordinates: 40°46′01″N 73°55′17″W
- Country: United States
- State: New York
- City: New York City
- County and borough: Queens
- Community District: Queens 1
- European settlement: 1652
- Named for: John Jacob Astor

Population (2024)
  - Total: 198,608 (including subsections)

Ethnicity
  - White: 56.5%
  - Hispanic: 22.0%
  - Asian: 17.2%
  - Black: 2.0%
  - Other/Multiracial: 2.3%
- Time zone: UTC−5 (EST)
  - Summer (DST): UTC−4 (EDT)
- ZIP Codes: 11101–11103, 11105, 11106
- Area codes: 718, 347, 929, and 917

Astoria is a neighborhood in the western portion of the New York City borough of Queens. Astoria is bounded by the East River to the west and north and is adjacent to four other Queens neighborhoods: Long Island City to the southwest, Sunnyside to the southeast, and Woodside and East Elmhurst to the east. As of 2024, Astoria has an estimated population of 198,608.

The Astoria area was originally inhabited by Native Americans known to Europeans as the Mespat or Maspeth tribe. European settlement began in the seventeenth century, notably by Englishman William Hallett and his wife Elizabeth Fones, leading to its original name of Hallett’s Cove. Stephen Halsey, known as the father of Astoria, expanded and improved the settlement in the 1830s. The village was incorporated in 1839 and named after fur tycoon John Jacob Astor.

During the second half of the 19th century, economic and commercial growth brought increased immigration. Astoria and several other surrounding villages were incorporated into Long Island City in 1870, which in turn was incorporated into the City of Greater New York in 1898. Commercial activity continued through the 20th century, with the area being a center for filmmaking and industry. Astoria is one of the most ethnically diverse neighborhoods in Queens.

Astoria is colloquially referred to by several nicknames: "Actoria," highlighting the neighborhood's significant population of actors, drawn by its proximity to the Kaufman Astoria Studios, Silvercup Studios, and the Theater District; "The People's Republic of Astoria", referencing the neighborhood's reputation as a progressive political hub that by 2023 had become the only district in the United States to elect Democratic Socialists of America representatives at municipal, state, and federal levels; and "The Big Apple's Fruit Basket," due to the thousands of fruit trees, particularly fig trees, cultivated in local yards.

Astoria is located in Queens Community District 1, and is patrolled by the New York City Police Department's 114th Precinct. Politically, Astoria is represented by the New York City Council's 22nd, 25th, and 26th districts.

== History ==
=== Early settlement ===
The area now known as Astoria was originally called Hallett's Cove (also spelled Hallet's Cove), after its first landowner, William Hallett (or Hallet), who settled there in 1652 with his wife, Elizabeth Fones. Hallett's acreage, granted by New Amsterdam director general Peter Stuyvesant, extended from the East River to about 29th Street; the northern boundary was a brook south of today's 25th Avenue and the southern boundary was Sunswick Creek. Following a widespread Native American attack in 1655, Stuyvesant ordered settlers in isolated areas to move to local villages for protection. The Halletts moved to Flushing and remained there for some years.

In 1664, New Amsterdam fell to the English and was renamed New York. In the same year, Hallett extended his original holdings by purchasing a large tract of land from local Native Americans, extending his holdings to include present day Steinway. Sometime thereafter, he applied to the British to recertify his right to the property, known as the Hell Gate Neck tract. This recertification, which became official in 1668, provided the basis for the Hallett family to clear land, farm, and reside on a number of homesteads over the succeeding century. The Halletts were prominent local landholders until the early 1800s.

Throughout the 1700s the Hallett's Cove settlement remained a rural outpost to New York, which was located on the southern tip of the island of Manhattan. Like the rest of New York, Hallett's Cove was occupied by the English for most of the Revolutionary War. In 1782, regular ferry service to New York began; the eastern terminus was at the site later occupied by the Sohmer Piano Factory at Vernon Boulevard and 31st Avenue.

In 1814, the area of Hallett's Point became the site of Fort Stevens, a defensive work to protect Hell Gate from a potential British attack during the War of 1812. The coastal fort also had an adjacent inland defensive position, Castle Bogardus, to protect from a land attack. Together these structures were the first permanent buildings in what would become Astoria. After the war the fort was abandoned, but by 1836 a small village of 20 to 30 dwellings was built, known as Hallett's Cove.

Beginning in the early 19th century, affluent New Yorkers constructed large residences along the Hallett's Cove shoreline, in the vicinity of 12th and 14th Streets, an area that later became known as Astoria Village (now Old Astoria). These summer homes and retreats for the wealthy coexisted with the beginnings of commercial activity further inland, including a stone quarry, a nursery, and turpentine distilleries. In 1835, a wealthy fur merchant named Stephen Halsey, then living in Flushing, moved to the Hallets Point area with the intention of expanding the rural settlement into a new and thriving village. In the following years he bought land, laid out streets, purchased the ferry service and moved it to Hallett's Cove, and created a new road, or turnpike, to connect with Flushing, along the route of today's Astoria Boulevard.

In 1839, Halsey applied to the New York state legislature to incorporate the village. Halsey had personal and business connections to noted fur merchant John Jacob Astor. He hoped to secure a donation of $2000 to found a Episcopal Female Seminary in the new village: in exchange, Halsey would name the village Astoria. Astor invested only $500, but the name stayed nonetheless. From Astor's summer home in Yorkville, Manhattan—on what is now East 87th Street near York Avenue—he could see across the East River to the new village named in his honor.

=== Economic development ===
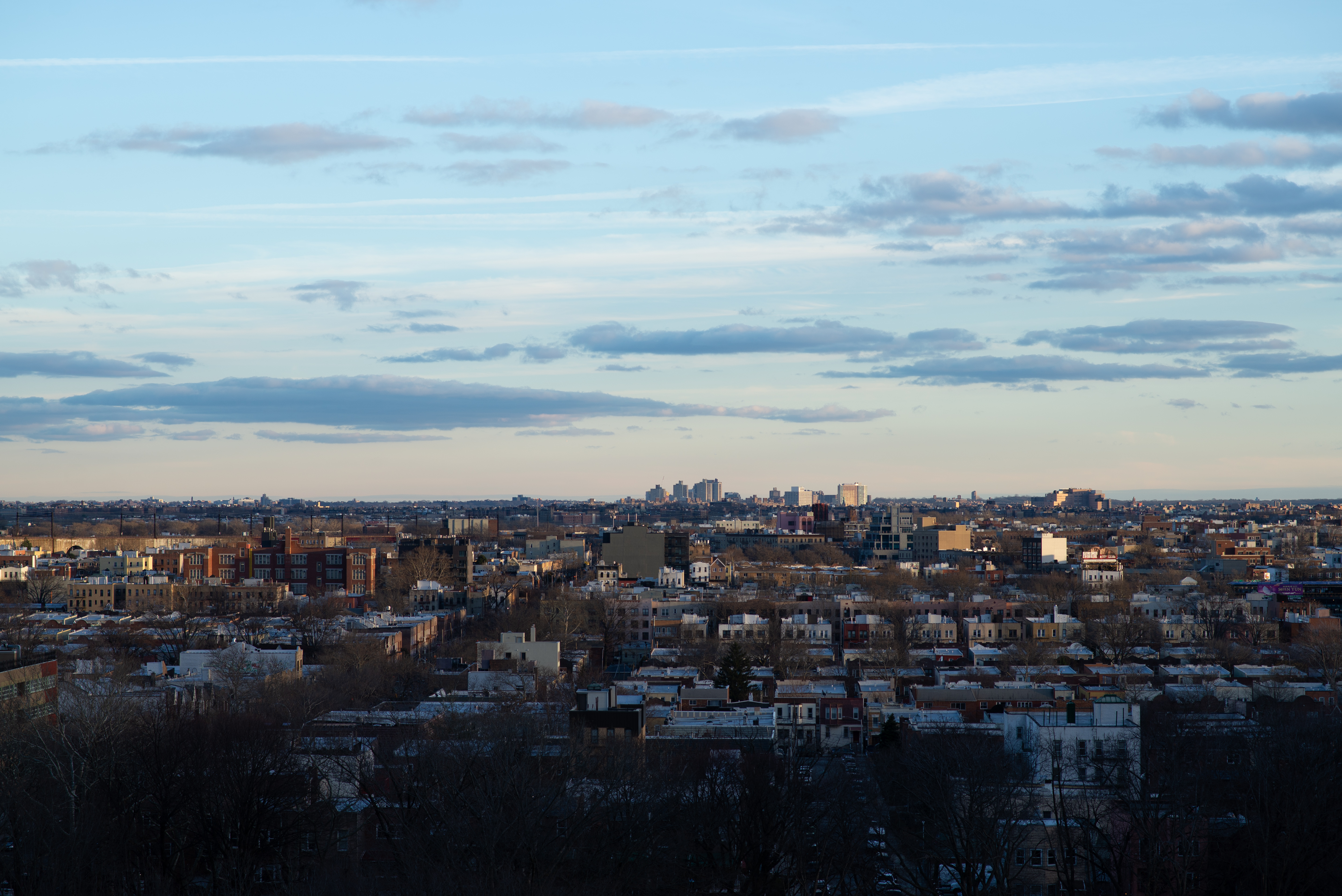
A view of Astoria from the Triborough Bridge

Following its official founding in 1839, Astoria continued to grow slowly until after the Civil War. German immigrants, particularly furniture and cabinet makers, became numerous beginning in the 1860s. In 1870, Steinway & Sons piano makers, already well established on the east side of Manhattan, built a piano factory and worker housing in the northernmost portion of Astoria. The Steinway company town provided a range of services including bilingual schools for workers’ children; it also included a sawmill and foundry, as well as a streetcar line. Part of the motivation for locating the Steinway factory in Queens was to keep the workers isolated from the ferment of labor organizing and radicalism occurring in other parts of New York, notably the Lower East Side.

Astoria and several other surrounding villages, including Steinway, Ravenswood, and Dutch Kills, were incorporated into Long Island City in 1870. Long Island City remained an independent municipality until it was incorporated into the City of Greater New York in 1898. The early twentieth century saw rapid growth in Astoria as new modes of transportation provided the stimulus to residential and commercial development: the Queensboro Bridge opened in 1909, the Astoria Line elevated subway began service in 1917, and trolley services expanded throughout Queens. The area's farms were quickly turned into housing tracts and street grids to accommodate the growing number of residents.

Astoria figured prominently in early American filmmaking. In 1920-21, Famous Players-Lasky Corporation, forerunner to Paramount Pictures, constructed a large motion picture production studio on 35th Avenue. This complex would be an important center of economic activity throughout the decade, with over 100 silent features produced. Astoria's film production heritage is preserved today by the Museum of the Moving Image and continued by Kaufman Astoria Studios.

In 2015, Astoria was included in NYU Furman Center's The State of New York City’s Housing and Neighborhoods study as New York City's 11th most gentrifying neighborhood.

== Demographics ==
The racial composition of Astoria, Queens, 2025.
1. White (52.2%)
2. Hispanic (25.4%)
3. Asian (14.3%)
4. Black (4.70%)
5. Other (3.40%)

=== 2020 census ===
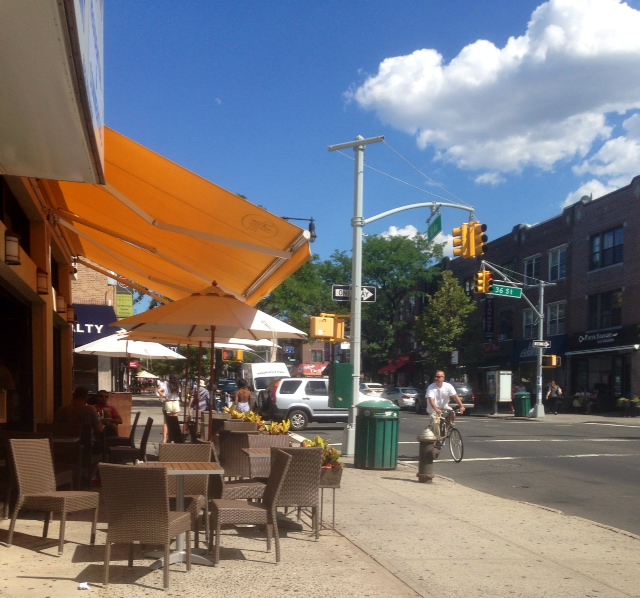
30th Avenue at 36th Street

Beginning with the 2020 United States census, the Federal government identifies Astoria/Queensbridge as the geographic area for which it compiles statistics, overlapping with Queens Community District 1. In 2024, there were an estimated 198,608 people in Astoria/Queensbridge, of which 52.2% (80,533) identified as Non-Hispanic White, 4.7% (7,204) as Black, 0.2% (250) as Native American, 14.3% (22,100) as Asian, 0.0% (70) as Pacific Islander, 1.0% (1,532) from other races, and 2.1% (3,238) from two or more races. Hispanic or Latino of any race were 25.4% (39,214) of the population. The household income group with the largest share (37.2%) of households was $100,001 – $250,000. In 2000, the same household income group had the largest share as well, with a slightly lower share of 29.4%. Median household income in 2024 was $93,460, about 11% more than citywide median household income ($83,970). The poverty rate in Astoria was 13.8% in 2024 compared to 18% citywide. The percentage of the foreign born population is 36.6%, compared to 44.9% in 2010. The percentage of persons with a language other than English spoken at home is 50.9%. The homeownership rate is 18.5% compared to a citywide percentage of 32.7%. The percentage of the population with a high school degree or higher is 89% and with a bachelor's degree or higher is 53.9%, as compared to New York City as a whole at 88% and 41.2%, respectively.

== 2010 census ==
For census purposes, the New York City government classifies Astoria as part of three neighborhood tabulation areas: Steinway, Old Astoria, and Astoria. Based on data from the 2010 United States census, the combined population of these areas was 154,141, a decrease of 17,427 (10.2%) from the 171,568 counted in 2000. Covering an area of 2,556.2 acres (1,034.5 ha), the neighborhood had a population density of 60.3 inhabitants per acre (38,600/sq mi; 14,900/km^{2}). The racial makeup of the neighborhood was 56.5% Non-Hispanic White, 2.0% Black, 0.1% Native American, 17.2% Asian, 0.0% Pacific Islander, 0.5% from other races, and 1.6% from two or more races. Hispanic or Latino of any race were 22.0% of the population. The Astoria and Old Astoria tabulation areas had greater Hispanic / Latino and Asian populations, and the Old Astoria area specifically had a greater Black population.

The entirety of Queens Community District 1, which includes Astoria and parts of Long Island City, had 199,969 residents according to NYC Health's 2018 Community Health Profile, with an average life expectancy of 83.4 years. This is higher than the median life expectancy of 81.2 for all New York City neighborhoods. Most inhabitants are middle-aged adults and youth: 16% are between the ages of 0–17, 41% between 25 and 44, and 22% between 45 and 64. The ratio of college-aged and elderly residents was lower, at 10% and 12% respectively.

As of 2024, the median household income in Community District 1 was $93,460. In 2018, an estimated 18% of Astoria residents lived in poverty, compared to 19% in all of Queens and 20% in all of New York City. Around 8% of residents were unemployed, compared to 8% in Queens and 9% in New York City. Rent burden, or the percentage of residents who have difficulty paying their rent, is 47% in Astoria, slightly lower than the boroughwide and citywide rates of 53% and 51% respectively. Based on this calculation, as of 2018, Community District 1 is considered to be gentrifying: according to the Community Health Profile, the district was low-income in 1990 and has seen above-median rent growth up to 2010.

=== Ethnic groups ===
==== Early populations ====
Astoria was first settled by the Dutch, English, and Germans in the 17th century. Many Irish settled in the area during the waves of Irish immigration into New York City during the 19th and early 20th centuries. During the late nineteenth century German Americans became a significant presence. Following World War I, Italians were the next significant immigrant group in Astoria, and numerous Italian delis, bakeries, and pizza shops are still found throughout Astoria, particularly in the Ditmars Boulevard area.

Jews were also a significant ethnic and religious group. The Astoria Center of Israel, which is listed on the National Register of Historic Places, was built in 1925 after outgrowing the former Congregation Mishkan Israel, which was built in 1904.

==== Later populations ====
The 1960s saw a large increase of Greeks, and after 1974, there was an influx of Cypriots. This cultural imprint can be seen in the numerous Greek restaurants, tavernas, bakeries, and cafes, as well as several Greek Orthodox churches. In the late 1960s, a 'Greek Town' neighborhood coalesced in Astoria. From 1960s to 1980s the number of Greeks constantly increased. While the population of Greeks in Astoria was 22,579 in 1980, it dropped to 18,127 by 1990 due to decreased immigration and lower birth rates. During the 2000s, the Greek immigration dropped again. During the 2010s and 2020s economic issues in Greece caused a resurgence of Greek immigration. Greek organizations in the area include the Hellenic American Action Committee (HANAC) and the Federation of Hellenic Societies of Greater New York.

Most of the 20,000 Maltese in New York City live in Astoria, and although this population has steadily been emigrating from the area, there are still many Maltese, supported by the Maltese Center of New York.

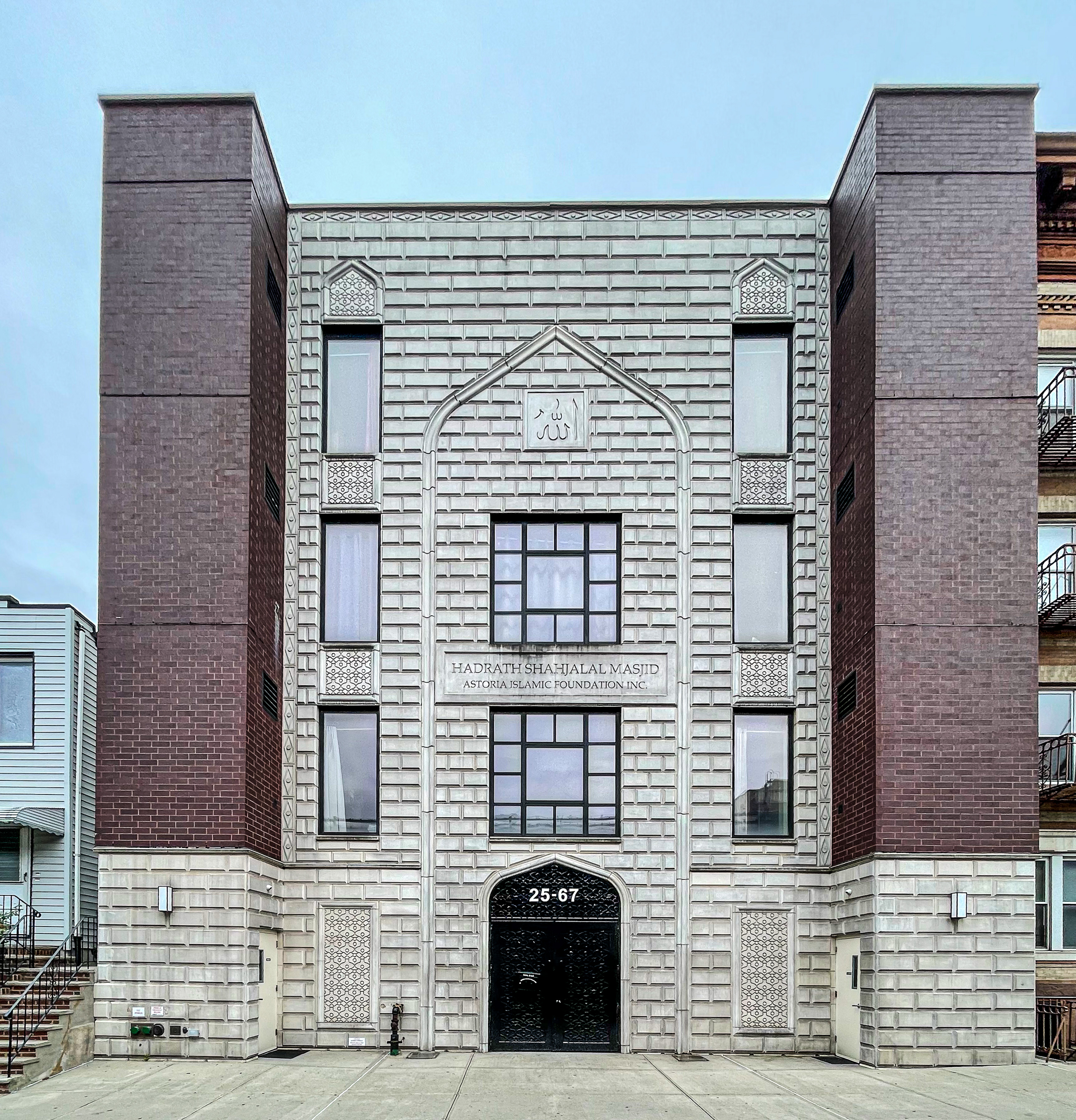
Hadrath Shahjalal Masjid is a Sunni mosque on 31st Street

Beginning in the mid-1970s, the neighborhood's Muslim population grew from earlier immigrants from Lebanon to also include people from Kosovo, Albania, Bosnia-Herzegovina, Montenegro, Egypt, Syria, Yemen, Tunisia, Morocco, and Algeria. In the 1990s, Steinway Street between 28th Avenue and Astoria Boulevard saw the establishment of many Arabic shops, restaurants, and cafes, which is unofficially called "Little Egypt", due to the number of Arabs residing there and the mostly Egyptian shops and lounges there.

Croatians from Croatia and Bosnia-Herzegovina have been numerous since the 1960s and their numbers continue to grow. New populations of South American and Balkan peoples have seen significant growth since the early 1990s, including a large population of Brazilians, who reside in the 36th Avenue area. Albanians, Bulgarians, Serbs, and Bosnians have also shown a rise in numbers. Many Spanish Americans live in Astoria, with most of them being of Galician heritage from Northwestern Spain; this community is supported by the Casa Galicia (Galicia House) and the Circulo Español (Spanish Circle).

At one time, many Bangladeshi Americans settled in Astoria, but by 2001, many of them had moved to Metro Detroit. A survey of an Astoria-area Bengali language newspaper estimated that, in an 18-month period until March 2001, 8,000 Bangladeshi people moved to the Detroit area. However, as of 2010, the Bangladeshi American community in Astoria has been increasing.

By the early 21st century, Astoria was one of the most ethnically diverse neighborhoods in Queens, with people from around 100 countries residing there as of 2015.

== Geography ==
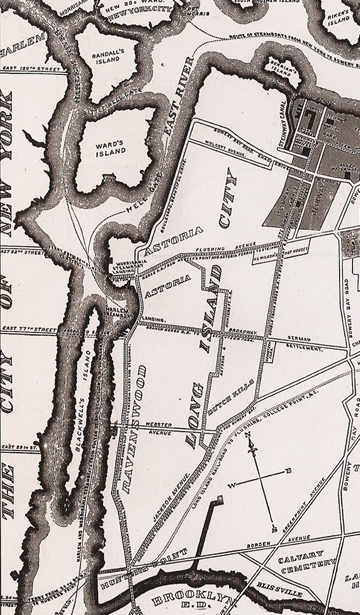
Detail of 1896 map of Long Island City, showing Astoria and Ravenswood, from the Greater Astoria Historical Society

There is some debate as to what constitutes the geographic boundaries of Astoria. The neighborhood was part of Long Island City prior to the latter's incorporation into the City of Greater New York in 1898.

The area south of Astoria was called Ravenswood, and traditionally, Broadway was considered the border between the two. Today, however, many residents and businesses south of Broadway identify themselves as Astorians for convenience or status, since Long Island City has historically been considered an industrial area, and Ravenswood is now mostly a low-income neighborhood. Some of the thoroughfares have lent their names to unofficial terms for the areas they serve. For instance, the eastern end of Astoria, with Steinway Street as its main thoroughfare, is sometimes referred to simply as "Steinway", and the northern end around Ditmars Boulevard is sometimes referred to as "Ditmars", with their convergence point bearing the neighborhood name "Ditmars-Steinway". Banners displayed on lamp posts along 30th Avenue refer to it as "the Heart of Astoria".

=== Ravenswood ===
Ravenswood is the name for the strip of land bordering the East River and Long Island City, and is part of Astoria. The etymology of Ravenswood may have been for the population of ravens, or a character from The Bride of Lammermoor. It was situated around Sunswick Creek, which drained into the East River at the current location of Socrates Sculpture Park. The area that became Socrates Sculpture Park has also historically been referred to as Gibbs Point.

The land was acquired in 1814 by Col. George Gibbs, a businessman from New York City who developed it. Gibbs died in 1833, and the land was divided into nine parcels by three developers. For a brief period, from 1848 to the 1870s, Ravenwood was home to a number of magnificent mansions and large estates which served as country retreats for wealthy New Yorkers. A steamboat ferry provided convenient service to the island of Manhattan.

Ravenswood, in contrast to the growing village of Astoria, was sparsely populated and remained unincorporated. The elegant mansions along Vernon Avenue, with views of the East River, existed alongside the beginning of commercial activity. In 1870, Ravenswood, along with several other hamlets and the Village of Astoria, merged to form Long Island City.

In 1875, the first commercial buildings were erected, and the mansions were converted into offices and boarding houses. In 1879, the Long Island Terra Cotta Company was established in Ravenswood, by Rudolph Franke. By 1900, Ravenswood was heavily commercial, and remains so to this day. However, the name has retained its residential character through the New York City Housing Authority project that was built in 1949 to 1951 with this name between 34th and 36th Avenues, and 12th and 24th Streets.

The name also identifies the large electric power station established along the shore of the East River, just south of the Roosevelt Island Bridge. The Ravenswood Generating Station which includes Ravenswood No. 3 or "Big Allis", was built by Con Edison in 1963–65 but, due to deregulation, has subsequently been owned by KeySpan, National Grid, and TransCanada. The power plant can generate approximately 2,500 megawatts of power, which is about 20% of New York City's electricity demand.

=== Ditmars ===
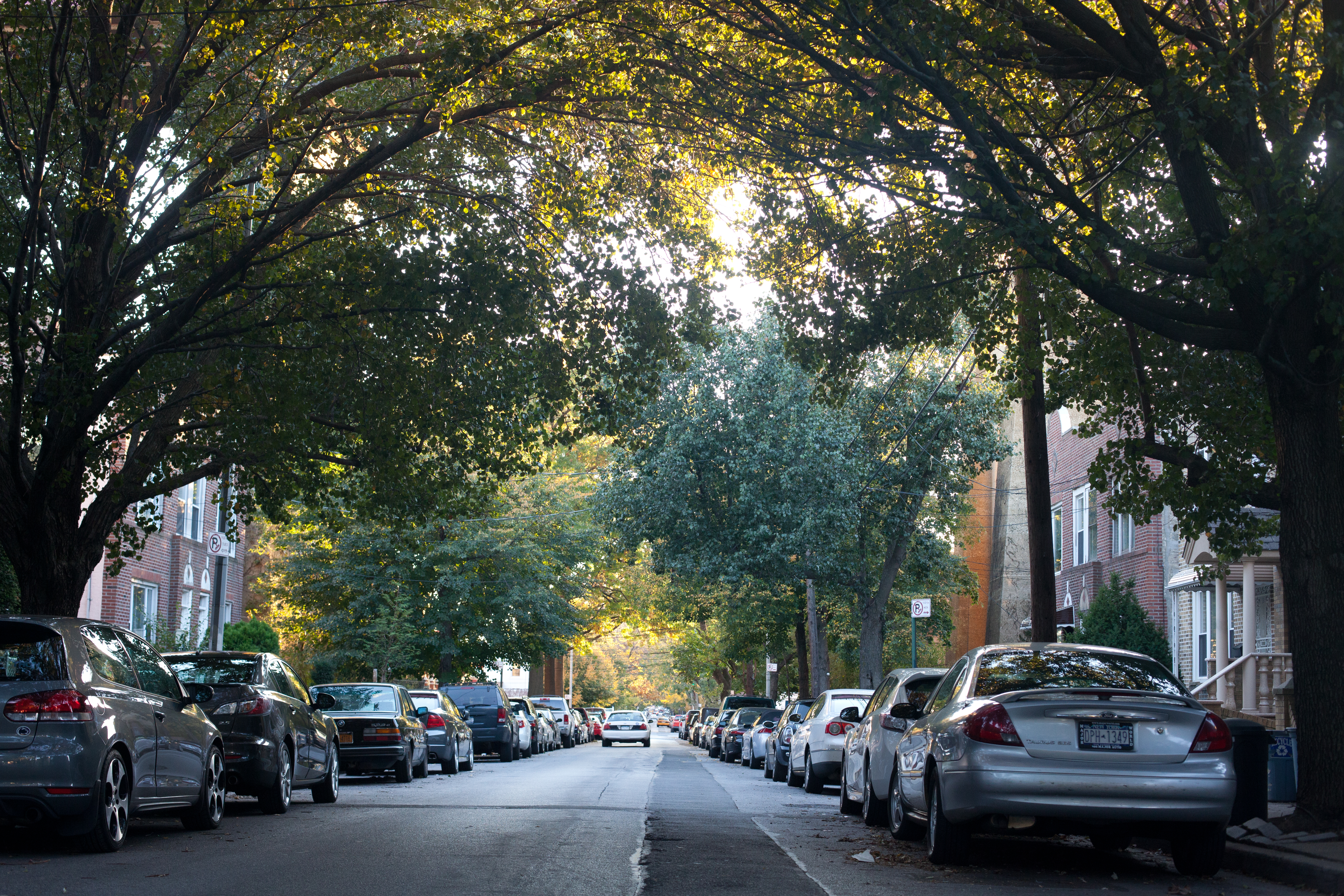
A street in Ditmars (2012)

Ditmars is a middle class section of Astoria bounded by Bowery Bay to the north, 31st Street and the Steinway subsection to the east, 23rd Avenue to the south, and the East River to the west. The adjacent Steinway neighborhood was largely developed as a company town by the Steinway & Sons piano company, and included houses and public facilities that were also available to non-employees. However, the Ditmars neighborhood was not included in the Steinway & Sons company housing and related facilities project. The neighborhood takes its name from Ditmars Boulevard which was named in honor of Abram Ditmars, the first mayor of Long Island City, New York, elected in 1870. The city became a mere neighborhood when Queens became a part of Greater New York. His ancestors were German immigrants who settled in the Dutch Kills area in the 1600s.

=== Astoria Heights ===
Astoria Heights, or Upper Ditmars, part of East Elmhurst, is bounded by Hazen Street to the west, La Guardia Airport to the east, Bowery Bay to the north, and Astoria Boulevard and the Grand Central Parkway to the south. It is mostly a quiet middle class neighborhood of one- and two-family private homes.

The Riker-Lent Homestead is near the north end of Astoria Heights at 78-03 19th Road. Built around 1655 by Abraham Riker under a patent from Nieuw Nederland's last governor, Peter Stuyvesant, it is believed to be the oldest remaining dwelling in New York City still used as a residence. There is an adjacent family cemetery. The Smiths, who bought the house in 1975, have been restoring it for many years.

Before Prohibition, there were dance halls, picnic areas, and amusement park rides at North Beach.

Ragtime composer Scott Joplin is buried across the Grand Central Parkway at St. Michael's Cemetery, which occasionally holds ragtime concerts.

The Rikers Island Bridge to New York City's main prison, Rikers Island, runs from the north end of Hazen Street. Technically, Rikers Island is in the Bronx since New York City took it over from Long Island City in 1884, after it had annexed the South Bronx but before it consolidated Queens. However, like Astoria Heights, Rikers Island gets its mail from the East Elmhurst (ZIP Code 11370) station of the Flushing Post Office.

== Places of interest ==
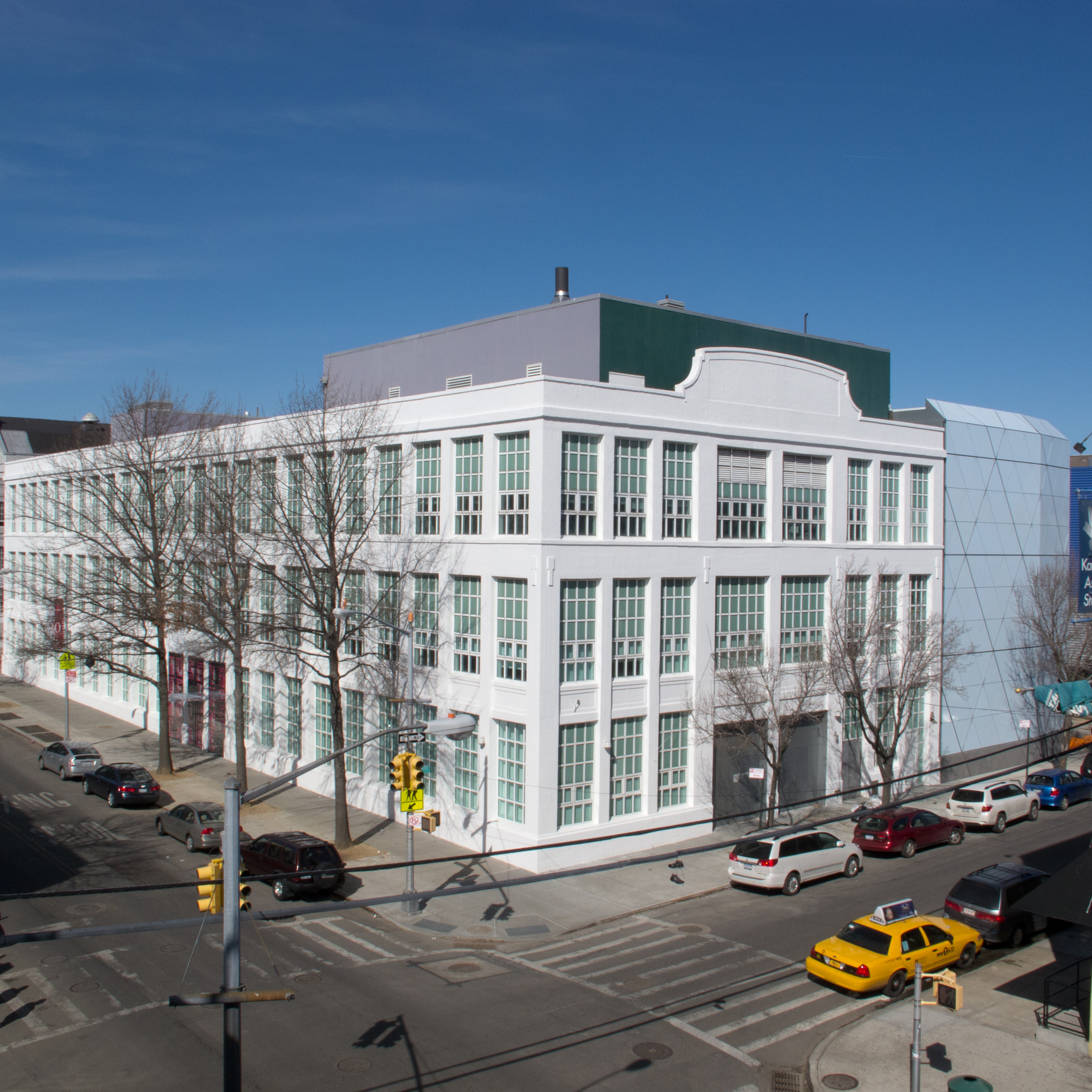
The Museum of the Moving Image on 35th Avenue in Astoria

- Museum of the Moving Image in the former Kaufman Astoria Studios building
- Isamu Noguchi Museum
- Socrates Sculpture Park
- Halletts Point Esplanade, a newly constructed riverside public park developed by The Durst Organization as part of their building complex attached to 10 Halletts Point, 20 Halletts Point, and 30 Halletts Point. Visitors can view the East River and Manhattan skyline.
- Astoria Park along the East River, is Astoria's largest park and also contains the largest of New York City's public pools (at 330 feet long) which was also the former site of the 1936 and 1964 U.S. Olympic trials.
- The Hell Gate Bridge and New York Connecting Railroad/Northeast Corridor viaduct rise high above Astoria.
- The oldest beer garden in New York City, Bohemian Hall, was founded in 1910 when Astoria was largely Irish, Italian, Bohemian (Czech), and Slovak.
- The Greater Astoria Historical Society, formerly located in the Quinn Memorial Building at the corner of Broadway and 36th Street, serves as a valuable historical resource.
- St. Michael's Cemetery on Astoria Boulevard is the burial place of ragtime composer and pianist Scott Joplin and gangster Frank Costello. The cemetery hosts annual public events and concerts to celebrate Joplin's musical legacy, including a Joplin retrospective.
- Steinway & Sons piano factory located at 1 Steinway Place (not to be confused with Steinway Street) has been in operation in Astoria since the late 19th century and represents a legacy of award-winning craftsmanship, arts patronage, and the once vibrant, stand-alone Steinway Village.
- The Modern Art Foundry, a foundry, is located in Astoria.
- In addition to Bohemian Hall, the Astoria Center of Israel, Paramount Studios Complex, Sohmer and Company Piano Factory, Steinway Mansion, and Trinity Lutheran Church are listed on the National Register of Historic Places.
- The 1938 birthplace of xerography, and thus Xerox, by Chester Carlson at 32-05 37th Street.
- Rainey Park bordering Vernon Boulevard
  Rainey Park, on an 8-acre (3.2 ha) site located on Vernon Boulevard between 33rd Road and 34th Avenue, is the largest park in Ravenswood, once an exclusive neighborhood with spacious plots of land along Vernon Boulevard.

== Police and crime ==
Astoria is patrolled by the 114th Precinct of the NYPD, located at 34-16 Astoria Boulevard. The precinct also covers parts of Long Island City and Woodside. The 114th Precinct has a lower crime rate than in the 1990s, with crimes across all categories having decreased by 83.9% between 1990 and 2019. The precinct reported 2 murders, 34 rapes, 184 robberies, 364 felony assaults, 196 burglaries, 782 grand larcenies, and 136 grand larcenies auto in 2019. From 2019 to 2024, the 114th Precinct has seen an increase of 44.3% in the seven major felony offenses.

In 2018, Queens Community District 1 had a non-fatal assault hospitalization rate of 56 per 100,000 people, compared to the boroughwide rate of 37 per 100,000 and the citywide rate of 59 per 100,000. Its 2018 incarceration rate was 277 per 100,000 people, compared to the boroughwide rate of 315 per 100,000 and the citywide rate of 425 per 100,000.

Of the five major violent felonies (murder, rape, felony assault, robbery, and burglary), the 114th Precinct had a rate of 385 crimes per 100,000 residents in 2019, compared to the boroughwide average of 424 crimes per 100,000 and the citywide average of 572 crimes per 100,000.

== Fire safety ==
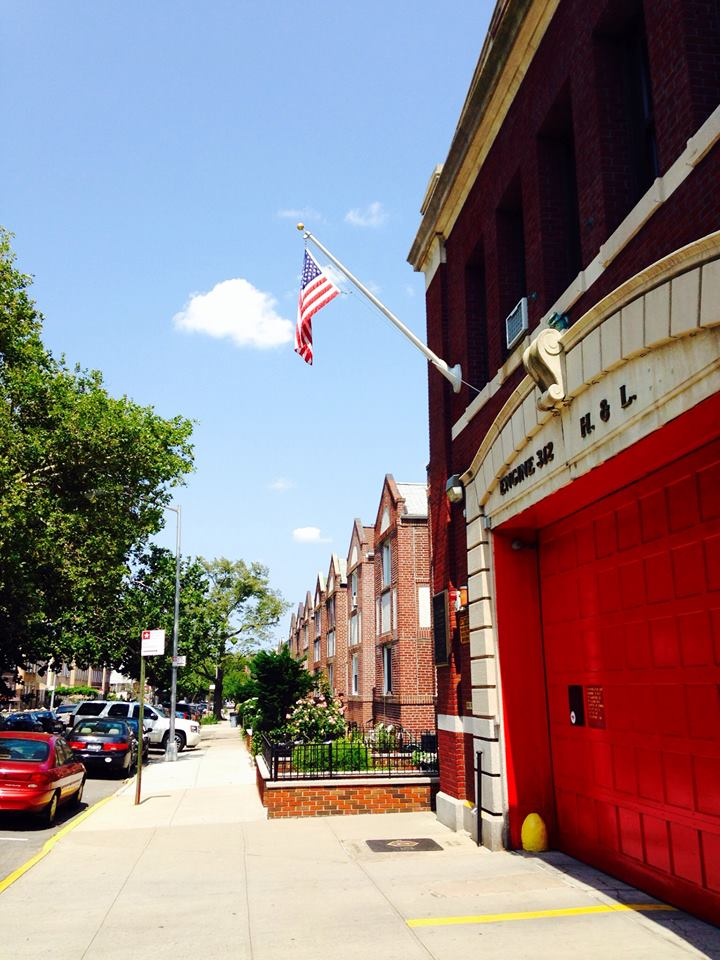
FDNY Engine Company 312

Astoria is served by four New York City Fire Department (FDNY) fire stations:

- Engine Company 263/Ladder Company 117 – 42-08 Astoria Boulevard South
- Engine Company 262/Decon 2 – 30-89 21st Street
- Engine Company 260 – 11-15 37th Avenue
- Battalion 49/Engine Company 312 – 22-63 35th Street

== Health ==
As of 2018, preterm births and births to teenage mothers are less common in Astoria than in other places citywide. In Astoria, there were 84 preterm births per 1,000 live births (compared to 87 per 1,000 citywide), and 15.1 births to teenage mothers per 1,000 live births (compared to 19.3 per 1,000 citywide). Astoria has a relatively average population of residents who are uninsured. In 2018, this population of uninsured residents was estimated to be 12%, which is equal to the citywide rate of 12%.

The concentration of fine particulate matter, the deadliest type of air pollutant, in Astoria is 0.0078 milligrams per cubic metre (7.8×10^{−9} oz/ft^{3}), higher than the citywide and boroughwide averages. 19% of Astoria residents are smokers, which is higher than the city average of 14% of residents being smokers. In Astoria, 19% of residents are obese, 11% are diabetic, and 29% have high blood pressure—compared to the citywide averages of 24%, 11%, and 28% respectively. In addition, 22% of children are obese, compared to the citywide average of 20%.

89% of residents eat some fruits and vegetables every day, which is higher than the city's average of 87%. In 2018, 79% of residents described their health as "good", "very good", or "excellent", about the same as the city's average of 78%. For every supermarket in Astoria, there are 10 bodegas.

Astoria is served by the Mount Sinai Hospital of Queens.

== Education ==
Astoria generally has a higher ratio of college-educated residents than the rest of the city as of 2018. Half of residents (50%) have a college education or higher, while 16% have less than a high school education and 33% are high school graduates or have some college education. By contrast, 39% of Queens residents and 43% of city residents have a college education or higher. The percentage of Astoria students excelling in math rose from 43% in 2000 to 65% in 2011, and reading achievement rose from 47% to 49% during the same time period.

Astoria's rate of elementary school student absenteeism is about equal to the rest of New York City. In Astoria, 19% of elementary school students missed twenty or more days per school year, less than the citywide average of 20%. Additionally, 78% of high school students in Astoria graduate on time, more than the citywide average of 75%.

=== Schools ===
The New York City Department of Education operates Astoria's public schools.

Astoria also has a number of private schools, most of which offer parochial education:

- Immaculate Conception Catholic Academy (Nursery – 8th grade) (21-63 29th Street)
- Les Enfants Montessori School (29-21 Newtown Avenue)
- Our Lady of Mt. Carmel School (23-15 Newtown Avenue)
- Astoria Lutheran School (31-20 21st Avenue)
- St. Catherine and St. George School (22-30 33rd Street)
- St. Demetrios Astoria School (30-03 30th Drive)
- St. Francis of Assisi School (21-18 46th Street)
- St. John's Preparatory School (21-21 Crescent Street)
- St. Joseph's Academy (Pre-K – 8th) (28-46 44th Street)
- Most Precious Blood School (Pre-K – 8th) (32-52 37th Street)
- El-Ber Islamic School (25-42 49th Street)

=== Libraries ===
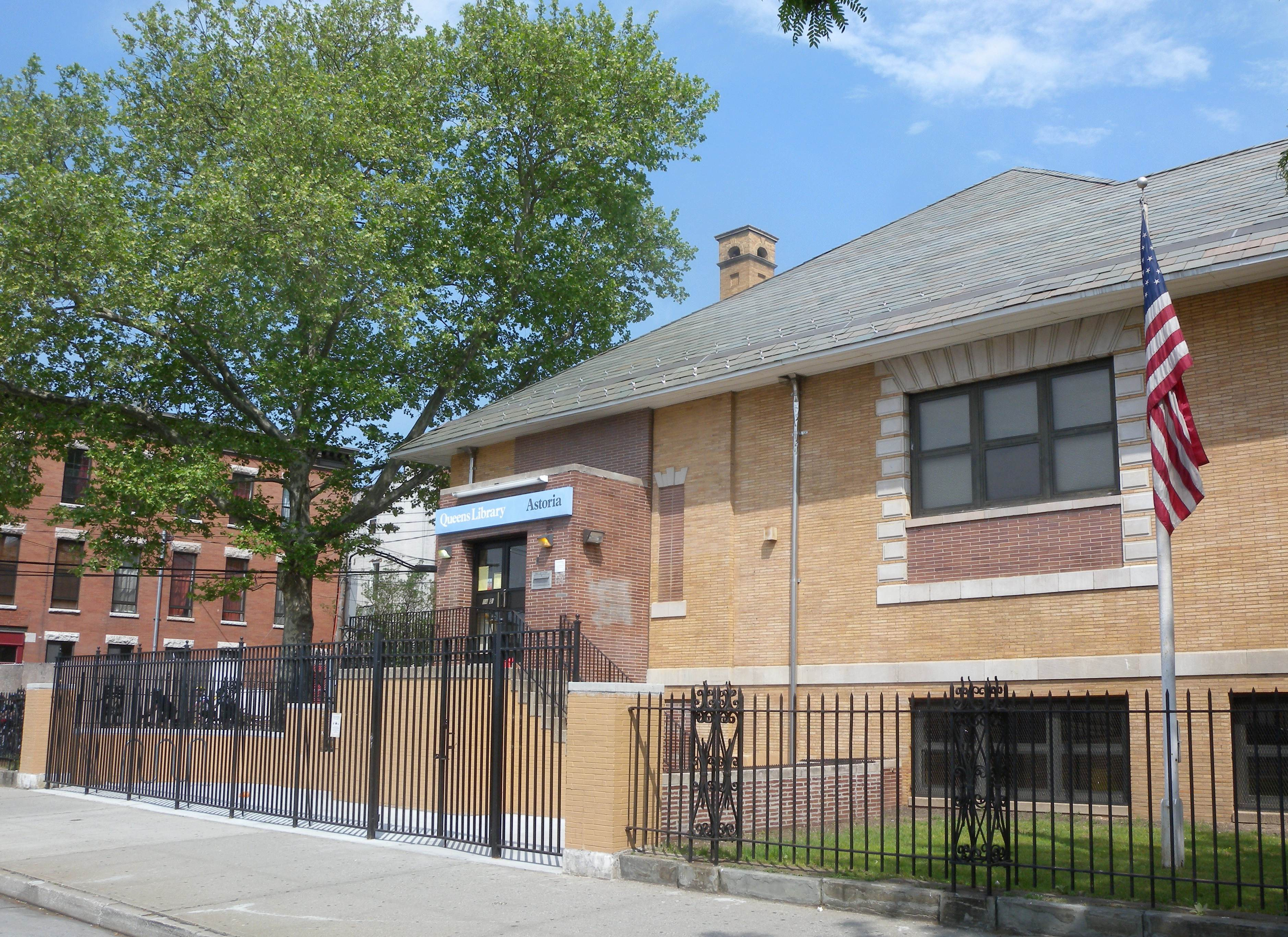
The Astoria Boulevard library branch

The Queens Public Library operates three branches within Astoria:

- The Astoria branch at 14-01 Astoria Boulevard
- The Broadway branch at 40-20 Broadway
- The Steinway branch at 21-45 31st Street

== Transportation ==
=== Public transportation ===
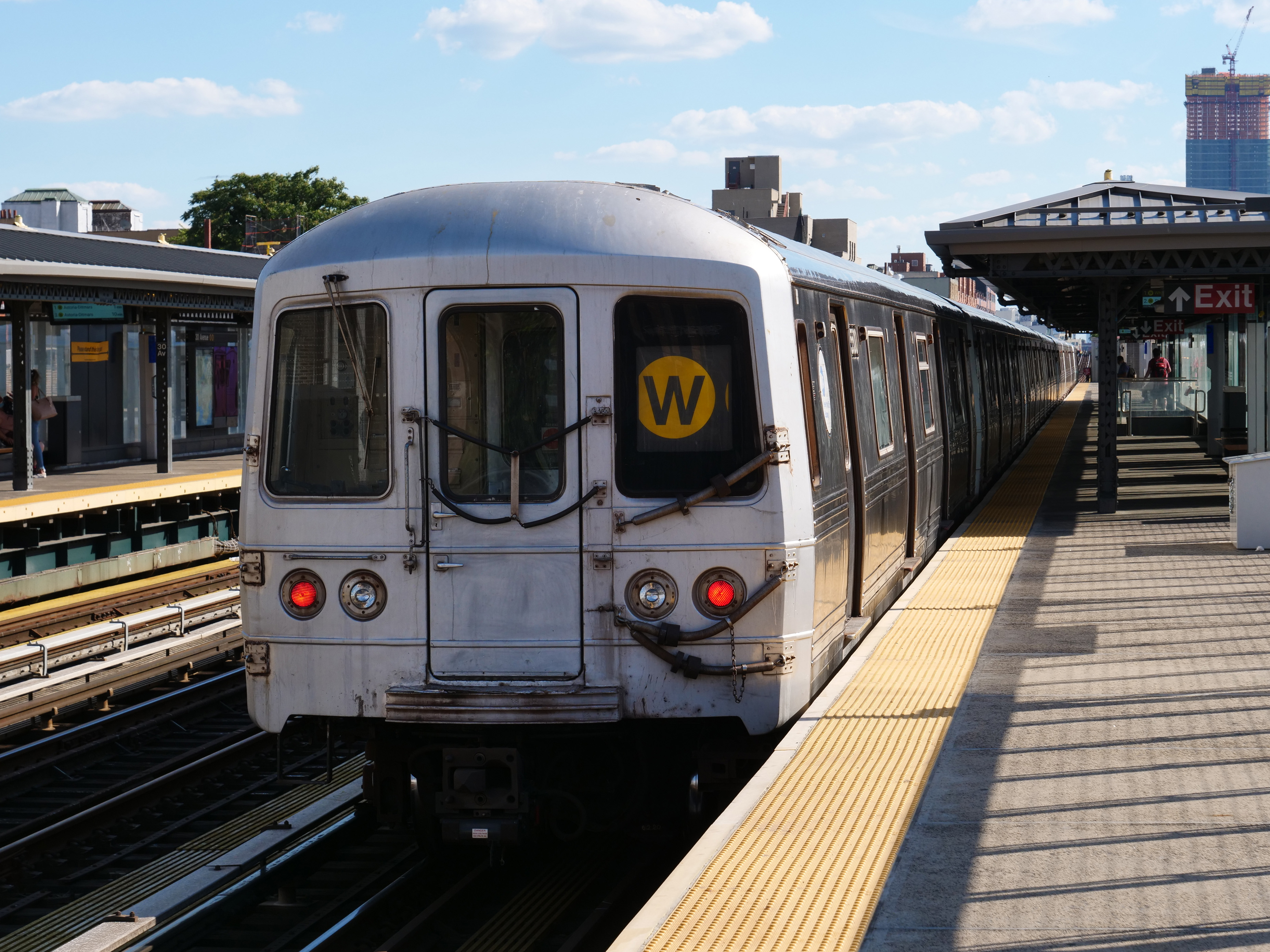
A southbound W train at 30th Avenue station

The following New York City Subway stations serve Astoria:

- 30th Avenue (N and W trains)
- 36th Avenue (N and W trains)
- 36th Street (M and R trains)
- 46th Street (M and R trains)
- Astoria Boulevard (N and W trains)
- Astoria–Ditmars Boulevard (N and W trains)
- Broadway (N and W trains)
- Steinway Street (M and R trains)

The following MTA Regional Bus Operations bus routes serve Astoria:

- Q18: to Maspeth via 30th Avenue
- Q19: to Flushing–Main Street (7 and <7> trains) via Astoria Boulevard
- Q63: to Court Square–23rd Street (7, <7>, E, F, <F>, and G trains) or Flushing–Main Street (7 and <7> trains) via Northern Boulevard
- Q66: to Queensboro Plaza (7, <7>, N and W trains) or Flushing–Main Street (7 and <7> trains) via 35th Avenue
- Q69: to Queensboro Plaza (7, <7>, N and W trains) or East Elmhurst via 21st Street and Ditmars Boulevard
- Q100: to Queens Plaza (E, F, <F>, and R trains) or Rikers Island, Bronx via 21st Street and 20th Avenue
- Q101: to Hunters Point Ferry or Steinway via Steinway Street and 20th Avenue
- Q102: to Roosevelt Island or Court Square–23rd Street (7, <7>, E, F, <F>, and G trains) via 31st Street and 36th Avenue
- Q103: to Hunters Point Ferry via Vernon Boulevard
- Q104: to 46th Street–Bliss Street (7 train) via Broadway
- B62: to Downtown Brooklyn via 21st Street and 30th Avenue
- M60 SBS: to Morningside Heights, Manhattan, or LaGuardia Airport via Astoria Boulevard

Astoria has been served by NYC Ferry's Astoria route since August 2017.

=== Roads ===
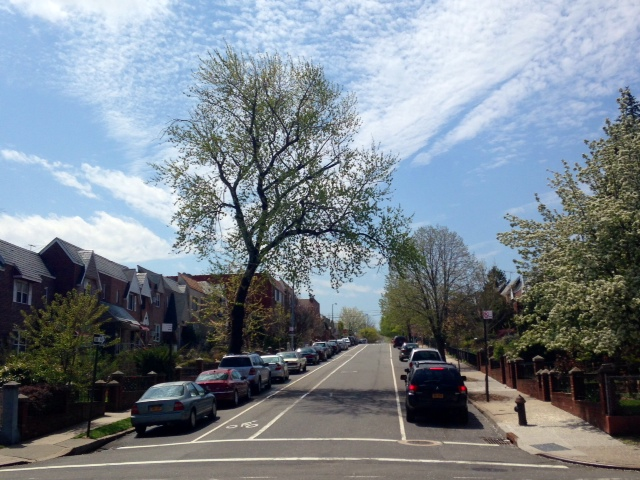
A residential street in Astoria with bike lanes

The primary streets running north–south are Vernon Boulevard along the East River; 21st Street, a major traffic artery with a mix of residential, commercial and industrial areas; 31st Street; and Steinway Street (named for Heinrich Engelhard Steinweg (later Henry E. Steinway), founder of the piano company Steinway & Sons), a major commercial street with many retail stores.

Bicycle lanes, built as part of the New York City Department of Transportation's bike lane network, include marked or protected space on several avenues (running east/west) and streets (running north/south). Main north/south routes are Vernon Boulevard and Crescent Street. Main east/west routes are 20th Avenue, 31st Avenue and Queens Plaza North. Shore Boulevard, which runs along the western border of Astoria Park and Ralph Demarco Park, is closed to cars and open only to pedestrian and bicycle traffic.

== Politics ==
Politically, Astoria is in New York's 7th and 14th congressional districts, represented by Democrats Nydia Velázquez and Alexandria Ocasio-Cortez respectively. In the New York State Senate, Astoria is in the 11th, 12th, and 59th districts, represented by Democrats Toby Ann Stavisky, Michael Gianaris, and Kristen Gonzalez respectively.

In the New York State Assembly, Astoria is in the 34th and 36th districts, represented by Democrats Jessica González-Rojas and Diana C. Moreno respectively. Astoria is also in the New York City Council's 22nd, 25th, and 26th districts, represented respectively by Tiffany Cabán, Shekar Krishnan, and Julie Won.

There is some history of settlement in Astoria by progressive-minded immigrants, including Germans in the late 19th century and Greeks about a hundred years later, as well as Steinway Village, a model village built around the Steinway piano factory that incorporated elements of utopian socialism. However, for much of its recent history the area tended to display support for relatively conservative Democrats, symbolized by it serving as the fictional home of Archie Bunker, the bigoted central character of the 1970s sitcom All in the Family.

This changed from the 2010s, when the area's politics shifted leftwards, so that by 2023 it was represented by at least one legislator supported by the Democratic Socialists of America at all levels: Alexandria Ocasio-Cortez in the United States House of Representatives (after defeating the relatively moderate Joe Crowley in the 2018 Democratic primary), Zohran Mamdani in the New York State Assembly (who successfully primaried the left-leaning but non-socialist Aravella Simotas in 2020), Tiffany Cabán on the New York City Council, and Kristen Gonzalez in the New York State Senate. This shift led to the area earning the nickname of "The People's Republic of Astoria", and being recognized as being at the heart of the "Commie corridor" which has become a stronghold of progressivism in New York City politics.

This shift may be due to demographic changes in the area, with an influx of young families concerned about cost of living issues as well as Middle Eastern and South Asian immigrants less tied to the city's Democratic political machine than white ethnic communities, resulting in the building of a political coalition of younger voters, renters, South Asians and Muslims, as well as more conservative longer term residents shifting towards the Republican Party.

== Notable people ==
- Alvey A. Adee (1842–1924), acting U.S. Secretary of State
- Natalie and Nicole Albino, of the musical duo Nina Sky
- Ted Alexandro (born 1969), comedian
- Iris Apfel (1921–2024), businesswoman and style icon
- Joe Bastianich (born 1968), chef and restaurant owner
- Lidia Bastianich (born 1947), celebrity chef, TV host, cookbook author and restaurateur
- Bob Beckwith (1932–2024), firefighter who stood next to George W. Bush during his speech at the World Trade Center ruins
- Tony Bennett (1926–2023), Grammy-winning singer
- Panayiota Bertzikis (born 1981), author, public speaker, and women's rights activist
- Jay Black (1938–2021), lead singer of the band Jay and the Americans
- Frank Bonsangue, actor and television personality
- Eddie Bracken (1915–2002), actor
- Hillary Brooke (born Beatrice Peterson, 1914–1999), actress and Lou Costello's love interest on The Abbott and Costello Show
- The Cadillac Man, author, Land of the Lost Souls: My Life on the Streets
- Maria Callas (1923–1977), opera singer (early childhood)
- Chester Carlson (1906–1968), inventor of xerography and co-founder of Xerox
- Alex Corbisiero (born 1988), professional rugby union player
- Kambri Crews (born 1971), author and storyteller
- Robert Davi (born 1953), actor, who has appeared in The Goonies, Die Hard, and Licence to Kill
- Jesse Eisenberg (born 1983), actor
- Christian Finnegan (born 1973), comedian and actor
- Whitey Ford (1928–2020), New York Yankees pitcher
- John Frusciante (born 1970), guitarist for Red Hot Chili Peppers
- Ed Gardner (1901–1963), actor, best known for his work on Duffy's Tavern
- George Gemünder (1816–1899), German-born American violin maker who pioneered the construction of quality violins in the United States
- Anthony Giacchino (born 1969), filmmaker and producer
- George Gibbs (1815–1873), geologist who contributed to the study of the languages of the indigenous peoples of Washington Territory
- Shane Gillis (born 1987), comedian and podcast host
- Chamique Holdsclaw (born 1977), basketball player
- Jack Kelly (1927–1992), actor, mayor of Huntington Beach, California
- Anik Khan (born 1989), Bangladeshi-American hip-hop artist
- Nomiki Konst (born 1984), journalist
- Cyndi Lauper (born 1953), singer, songwriter, actress, LGBT activist
- Billy Loes (1929–2010), right-handed pitcher who spent eleven seasons in Major League Baseball with the Brooklyn Dodgers, Baltimore Orioles and San Francisco Giants
- George Maharis (1928–2023), actor and singer, best known for his work on Route 66
- Michael Malone (born 1971), NBA coach who won a championship as head coach of the Denver Nuggets in 2023.
- Zohran Mamdani (born 1991), 112th Mayor of New York City, previously member of New York State Assembly for the 36th district
- Melanie Martinez (born 1995), singer-songwriter, appeared on The Voice (2012)
- Patrick McGoohan (1928–2009), actor
- Chris Megaloudis (born 1984), soccer player for the Puerto Rico national football team
- John H. Meier (born 1933), financier and former business associate of Howard Hughes, also involved with Watergate
- Ethel Merman (1908–1984), Broadway actress and singer
- Eric Metaxas (born 1963), author, founder of "Socrates in the City"
- Marilyn Milian (born 1961), judge on television series The People's Court
- Dito Montiel (born 1965), author, screenwriter, director and musician
- Al Oerter (1936–2007), Olympic discus throw four-time gold medalist
- Nicole Petallides (born 1971), Fox Business reporter
- Henrietta Rodman (1877–1923), feminist and educator
- Melanie Safka (1947–2024), singer-songwriter
- Joe Santagato (born 1992), YouTuber and entertainer
- Franz Schurmann (1926–2010), Cold War-era expert on the People's Republic of China
- Larry Sharpe (born 1968), businessman and politician
- Dee Snider (born 1955), singer of heavy metal rock band Twisted Sister
- Christopher Walken (born 1943), Academy Award-winning actor
- Gordon Willis (1931–2014), Academy Award-winning-cinematographer

== Community ==
Astoria has a lively local community and hosts a number of neighborhood events. Since 2020, the 31st Ave Open Street, a branch of NYC Open Streets, runs programming on 31st Avenue with local businesses and artists. Shop Small Astoria, a collective of independent retail stores, host neighborhood shopping and drink crawls.

== In popular culture ==
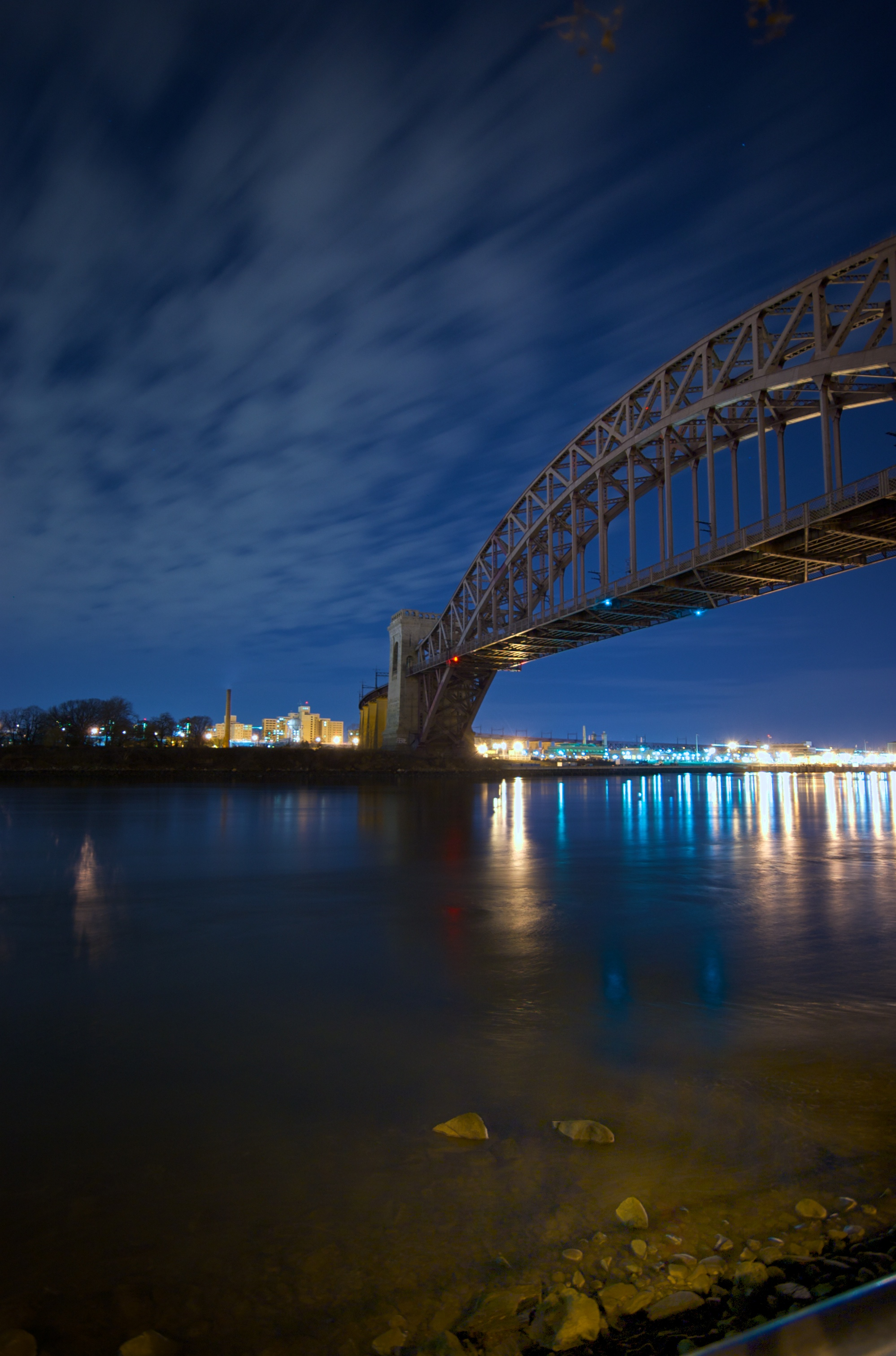
A night view of the Hell Gate Bridge from Astoria Park

The neighborhood has often been featured in various media; in film and television, the area is either featured as Astoria or as a setting for another location in New York City.

=== Film ===
- In the film Joe (1970), Peter Boyle's character is a "hippie-hating hardhat" who lives in Astoria.
- The 1973 film adaptation of the John-Michael Tebelak stage musical Godspell includes multiple images of characters beneath the supports for The Hell Gate Bridge, or East River Arch Bridge, as seen from Randall's Island, both while the plot unfolds as well as during visual montages that take place in such numbers as Day by Day and We Beseech Thee. The view of the bridge is similar to those found in Astoria Park and Astoria can occasionally be viewed in the background of shots facing east.
- Serpico (1973), with Al Pacino, had several scenes filmed in Astoria. For example, the elevated train stop at Ditmars Boulevard was the location for a chase scene, and Serpico has a clandestine meeting in Astoria Park under the Hell Gate Bridge.
- King Kong (1976) has a scene in Astoria, at Astoria Boulevard and 31st Street, where the two main characters board the RR train at the Astoria Boulevard station on the BMT Astoria Line.
- The 1982 film version of Tempest, starring John Cassavetes, had scenes shot at the cafes on 23rd Ave off 31st St.
- Five Corners (1987), starring Jodie Foster, was shot in Astoria.
- The movie Queens Logic (1991) was filmed all around Astoria and features an Astoria landmark—the Hell Gate Bridge. One of the screenwriters, Tony Spiridakis, has roots in Astoria.
- The Robert De Niro film A Bronx Tale (1993) was set in the Bronx, but most of the exterior scenes were filmed in Astoria as well as the nearby neighborhood of Woodside. The high school featured in the film is William Cullen Bryant High School on 31st Avenue, the church used in the film is St. Joseph's on 30th Avenue, and the funeral parlor scenes were shot from a funeral home on 30th Ave, across the street from St. Joseph's Church.
- The independent film Girls Town (1996) included scenes shot in Astoria Park.
- Woody Allen's film Hollywood Ending (2002) had scenes shot in the neighborhood surrounding the Kaufman Astoria stages.
- A Guide to Recognizing Your Saints (2006), starring Robert Downey Jr. and Shia LaBeouf, and adapted from Dito Montiel's 2001 memoir about the filmmaker's experiences growing up in the neighborhood during the 1980s, was filmed at various locations around Astoria.
- The Accidental Husband (2008), directed by Griffin Dunne, with Uma Thurman, Colin Firth and Jeffrey Dean Morgan was filmed in Astoria on 33rd Street and 23rd Avenue.
- People Places Things (2015) by James C. Strouse was filmed at several locations in Astoria, including Astoria Park; the protagonist, played by Jemaine Clement, is described as living in Astoria.

=== Gaming ===
- The video game Grand Theft Auto IV—which takes place in a mock New York City named Liberty City—has a neighborhood named Steinway in the borough of Dukes, the counterpart of Queens in the game. The game features a Bohemian Hall-inspired "Steinway Beer Garden", but as an Irish-and-German themed bar instead of Czech. (A mock TV commercial for the Steinway Beer Garden, viewable at the Rockstar website, includes the voice-over remarking that the Garden is "ethnically confused".) Steinway Park is modeled after Astoria Park, with its famous outdoor pool (including the diving platforms) and scenic water's-edge pathway. Numerous signs and awnings of real local Astoria businesses appear in the game, although the names have been altered (e.g. "ASTORIA Medical Dental" becomes "ROSARIA Medical Dental").
- The video game The Godfather II depicts Astoria in its version of New York City.
- The video game Spider-Man 2 has Astoria as an explorable area and is where Peter Parker's house is.

=== Literature ===
- In F. Scott Fitzgerald's novel The Great Gatsby (1925), Jay Gatsby is pulled over by a policeman on a "motor cycle" in Astoria while driving with the narrator into the city.
- Astoria is the setting for Dito Montiel's memoir, A Guide to Recognizing Your Saints (2001), later made into a 2006 film.
- Astoria is the setting for the novel Autobiography/Masquerade (2006), written to honor the memory of Antonio "Nino" Pellegrino, an Astoria native who appeared briefly in A Bronx Tale.
- In Ayn Rand's novel The Fountainhead (1943), lead character Howard Roark destroys the Cortlandt Homes housing project which is located on the East River in Astoria.

=== Music ===
- Sufjan Stevens recorded a majority of Illinoise at The Buddy Project Recording Studio in Astoria.
- Rapper Action Bronson filmed his music video "Strictly 4 My Jeeps" in Astoria. The video was released on May 20, 2013, as the single for his album Saaab Stories.
- Queens Metal band Emmure released a track on their 3rd studio album Felony titled "Bars in Astoria". It was featured on the Ibanez website in their interview with members of the band in promotion of their product.
- The music video for the song "Your Love" (1985) by the British band The Outfield was set in a sound stage/painting studio in the rear of what is currently Strand Pharmacy at 25-01 Broadway. At the end of the video, the female "painter" walks out of the sound stage onto Crescent St. and then makes a left onto Broadway.

=== Television ===
- The 1970s situation comedy All in the Family was set in Astoria, although the address given for Archie Bunker's home (704 Hauser Street) is fictional, and the exterior of the house shown in the opening credits was shot elsewhere in Queens.
- The television series Cosby, starring Bill Cosby, Phylicia Rashad and Madeline Kahn (not to be confused with the earlier series The Cosby Show) was set in Astoria and was filmed there, at the Kaufman Astoria Studios on 35th Avenue.
- The Showtime original series Nurse Jackie (aired 2009-2015) was shot at Kaufman Astoria Studios as well as on location in Astoria.
- The Netflix original series Orange Is the New Black (aired 2013-2019) was shot at Kaufman Astoria Studios as well as on location in Astoria.
- The block of 37th Street between Ditmars Boulevard and 23rd Avenue is sometimes referred to as "the Seinfeld Street". In the Seinfeld television show, this street is occasionally seen in external establishing shots as the block where George Costanza's parents live.
- Kaufman Astoria Studios has further been longtime host to the PBS series Sesame Street and has been credited with local shoots on films like The Stepford Wives, the 2009 remake of The Taking of Pelham 123, and the Golden Globe-winning Angels in America.
- The character Abbi Abrams from Broad City lives in Astoria.
