= Hugo Sohmer =

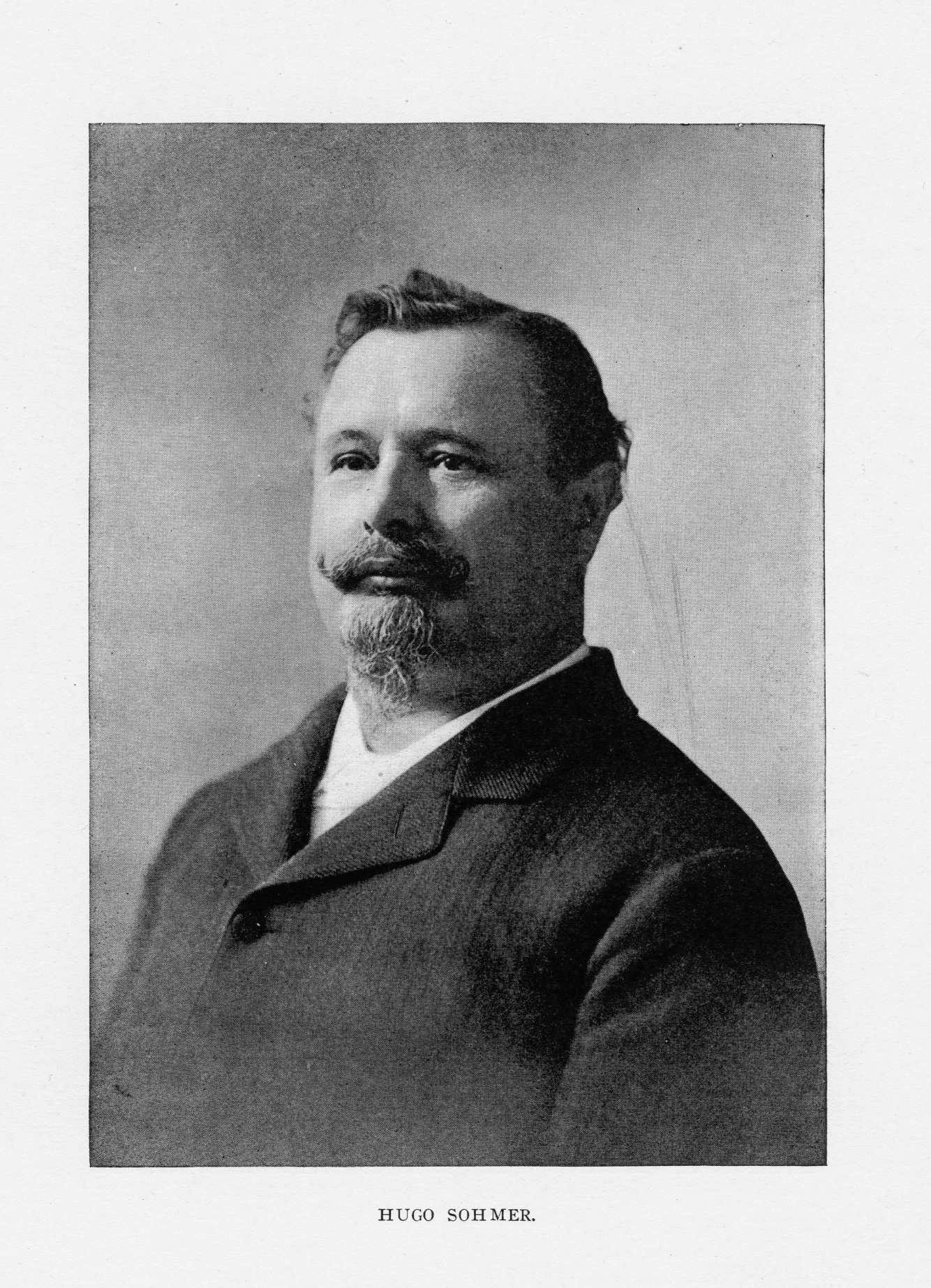

Hugo Sohmer (1845 in Dunningen, Kingdom of Württemberg - June 8, 1913 in Scarsdale, New York) was an American piano builder and manufacturer of German descent.

== Life ==
Hugo Sohmer (1845–1913) was born in Dunningen, a village near Rottweil, on the foothills of the Black Forest, Germany. His father was a physician and cared about a good education for his sons. So he was educated in literary and scientific subjects as well as music and the piano, and emigrated to New York City in 1863, where he apprenticed as a piano-builder in Schuetze & Ludolff's factory. He spent two years travelling in Europe continuing to study piano making, and returned to New York in 1870. In 1872 he founded Sohmer & Company in partnership with the Austrian piano builder Joseph Kuder (1831–1913). The company building in Queens built by Architects Berger & Baylies and finished in 1886 achieved the status of landmark in 2007. After his death he was succeeded by his son Harry J. Sohmer.

His younger brother William was a politician in New York city.

== Sources ==
- Georg von Skal: History of German immigration in the United States and successful German-Americans and their descendants. New York, Smiley, 1908, p. 127, 164
- Obituary, New York Times, June 10, 1913
