= Ettenbach =

River in Germany

Location
- Country: Germany
- State: Baden-Württemberg

Physical characteristics
- Mouth
  - location: Glatt
  - coordinates: 48.4670°N 8.4782°E

Basin features
- Progression: Glatt→ Neckar→ Rhine→ North Sea

Ettenbach is a small river of Baden-Württemberg, Germany. It flows into the Glatt in Aach.

== See also ==
- List of rivers of Baden-Württemberg
