= Heimbach (disambiguation) =

Heimbach is a town in the district of Düren in the state of North Rhine-Westphalia, Germany.

Heimbach may also refer to:

== Places and rivers in Germany ==
- Heimbach (Nahe), a municipality in the district of Birkenfeld, in Rhineland-Palatinate
- a part of Mömbris in Bayern
- a part of Teningen in Baden-Württemberg
- a part of Bad Schwalbach in Hesse
- a part of Neuwied in Rheinland-Pfalz
- a part of Gilserberg in Hessen
- Heimbach (Glatt), a river of Baden-Württemberg, tributary of the Glatt

== Other ==
- David Heimbach (1938–2017), American surgeon and a professor emeritus of the University of Washington
- Matthew Heimbach, founder of the Traditionalist Worker Party, a now disbanded American far-right group
- Wolfgang Heimbach (1615–1678), Baroque painter
- Heimbach Group, a supplier of textiles for the paper manufacturing, environmental technology and others
