= Betzweiler-Wälde =

Coordinates: 48°21′39″N 8°28′55″E

Betzweiler-Wälde is a former municipality, now part of Loßburg, in the district of Freudenstadt in Baden-Württemberg in Germany. It existed from 1971 until 2006. The municipality was formed on January 1, 1971, by merging the independent communities of Betzweiler and Wälde. As of June 30, 2006, it had 1,417 residents. On January 1, 2007, Betzweiler-Wälde was incorporated into the neighboring municipality of Loßburg.

== Geography ==
Betzweiler-Wälde was located in the Heimbachtal in the Central Black Forest, at an altitude of 536 to 700 meters. It was recognized as a health resort. The Heimbachaue nature reserve, which protected endangered plants and animals, lay between the two villages. Nearby was the historical Heimbach mill, first mentioned in 1250. It was renovated in 1978 and now serves as a hotel and restaurant.

== Administration ==
The municipality consisted of two districts: Betzweiler and Wälde. In 2005, discussions about merging with Loßburg began. A local referendum in 2006 confirmed the merger, with 65.5% of voters in favor. The merger took place in January 2007.

== Churches ==
Betzweiler was home to one of the few expressionist church buildings in Germany. The Evangelical parish church, completed in 1927, is a cultural monument. Due to its hillside location, the church's orientation deviates from the usual east-west axis. Additionally, the "Old Church" in Betzweiler dates back to the 15th century and was dedicated to St. George.

== Awards ==
Betzweiler-Wälde received the state nature award for its educational beekeeping project.
