= Arburg =

German manufacturing company

ARBURG GmbH + Co KG
- Company type: GmbH, KG
- Industry: Machine manufacturing, Plastics
- Founded: 1923
- Headquarters: Loßburg, Germany
- Revenue: 750 million euros (2018)
- Owner: Families Hehl and Keinath
- Number of employees: Around 3,600 worldwide(2023)
- Website: www.arburg.com

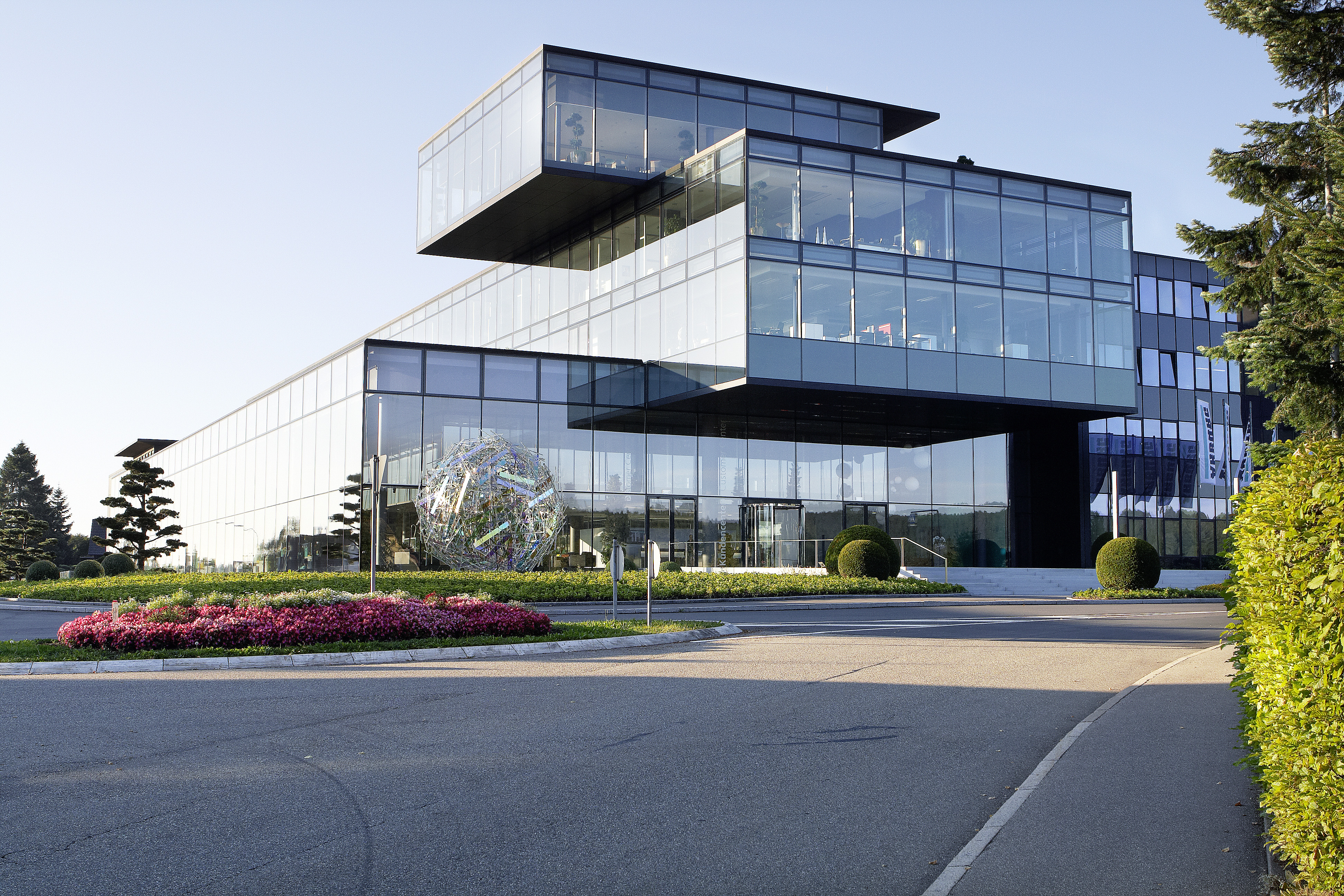
Arburg headquarters in Lossburg, Germany

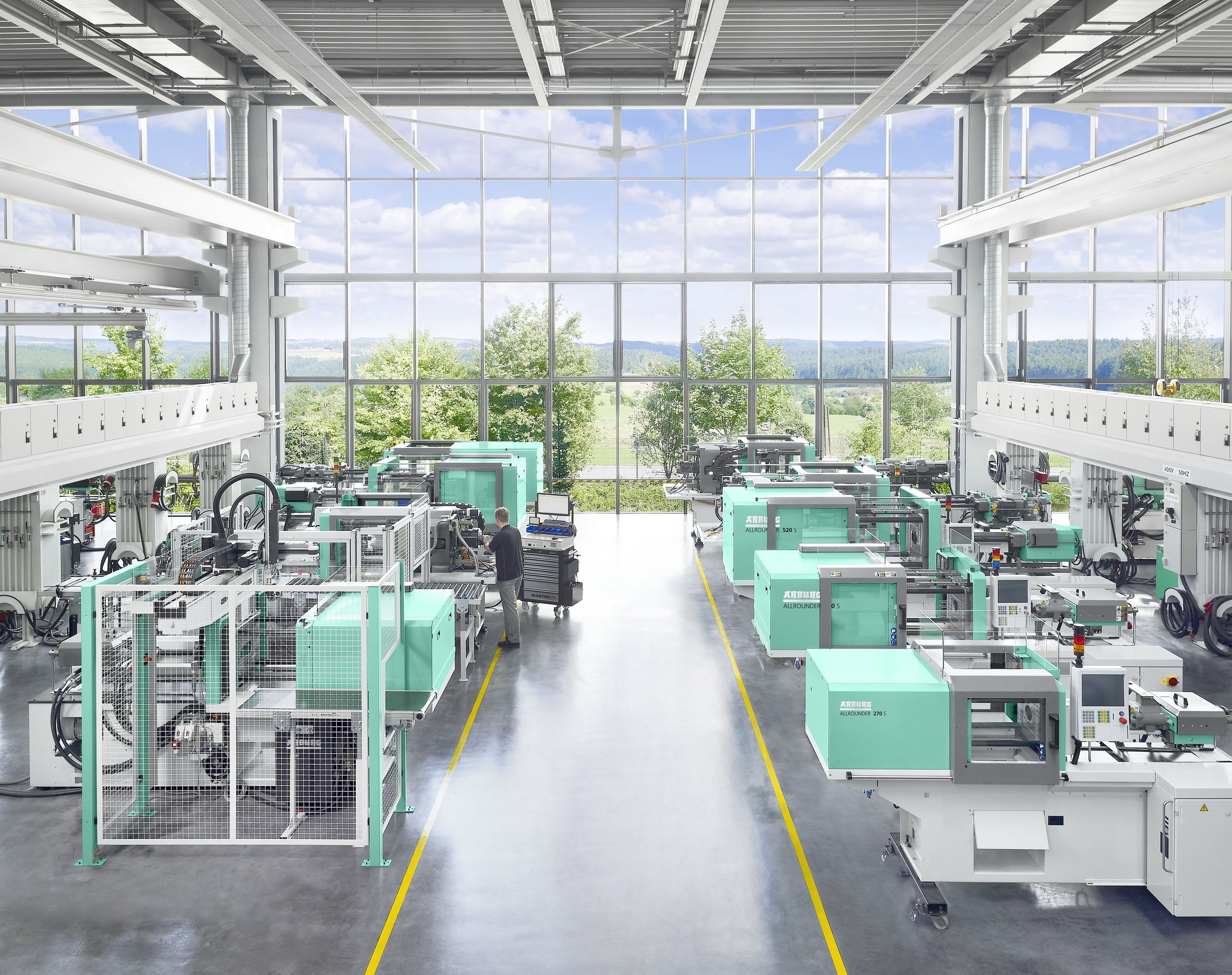
Arburg Injection Moulding Machines

Arburg GmbH + Co KG (referred to as ARBURG) is a German machine manufacturing company. It is owned by the Hehl and Keinath families and, with its electric, hybrid and hydraulic plastic injection moulding machines, turnkey systems and its industrial additive manufacturing system, is among the industry leaders worldwide. With approximately 2,500 employees in Germany and a further 500 worldwide, Arburg serves sales markets for machines with clamping forces ranging from 125 to 6,500 kN.

The machines are used for plastic part production in industries such as automotive, communications and consumer electronics, medical technology, domestic appliances and packaging. In addition, modular robotic systems and peripheral devices are produced. Arburg is represented by fully owned organisations at 33 locations in 25 countries and by trading partners in more than 50 countries. The central production and administration site is Lossburg in the Northern Black Forest, while other German locations include the "Technology Centers" in Radevormwald and Rednitzhembach.

The globally operating Hehl Group recorded a consolidated turnover of 750 million euros in 2018. With its arburgGreenworld programme, the injection moulding manufacturer Arburg is committed to circular economy and to the sustainable use of resources. Arburg's name was added to the Lexikon der deutschen Weltmarktführer, a compendium of German global market leaders, in 2010.

== Applications ==
In addition to standard injection moulding processes, the company also offers special equipment for areas such as multi-component injection moulding, the processing of thermoset, elastomer and silicone (Liquid Silicone Rubber), gas and water injection moulding technology (GIT, WIT), foaming technology, overmoulding of inserts, PIM (Powder Injection Moulding including: Metal Injection Molding and Ceramic Injection Moulding) as well as clean room technology. Moreover, Arburg has its own system for additive manufacturing (freeformer).

== Milestones ==
- 1923: Establishment of the Hehl family business
- 1956: Serial production of injection moulding machines begins
- 1960: Sale of the thousandth injection moulding machine
- 1961: Patent for the Allrounder principle, enabling up to ten different working positions on a single machine
- 1962: Development and production of the first two-colour machine
- 1982: First machine featuring a graphical user interface
- 1993: Introduction of the "Selogica" control system
- 2000: Inauguration of Arburg II, adding a further 36,000 square metres of floorspace to the production area, resulting in a total of 146,000 square metres
- 2006: Allrounder injection moulding machines with clamping forces up to 5,000 kN
- 2009: Inauguration of the new Arburg Customer Center
- 2012: Celebration of 60 years of training at Arburg with 1,500 trainees
- 2013: Presentation of the freeformer additive manufacturing system (ARBURG Plastic Freeforming)
- 2015: Senior partner Eugen Hehl is inducted into the "Plastics Hall of Fame"
- 2016: Inauguration of the new assembly hall in Lossburg – expansion to 165,000 square metres
- 2016: Presentation of the Allrounder 1120 H with a clamping force of 6,500 kN in a new design and with the new "Gestica" control system.
- 2018: Presentation of the largest freeformer 300-3X
- 2020: Inauguration of the new Arburg training centre

== Awards (Selection) ==
- 2012 "Georg-Menges-Preis" for Herbert Kraibuehler
- 2014 Reddot Design Award for the "freeformer" 3D printer
- 2015 Eugen Hehl is inducted into the "Plastics Hall of Fame"
- 2015 Baden-Wuerttemberg Competence Prize for Eugen Hehl
- 2016 Leonardo da Vinci Award for the “freeformer” 3D printer
- 2017 Industry 4.0 Prize
- 2018 Triple award for Arburg’s training programme
- 2018 iF Design Award for the "Allrounder 1120 H"
- 2018 Reddot Design Award for the "Gestica" control system
- 2019 Bosch Global Supplier Award
- 2020 VDI medal of honour for Eugen Hehl
