= Heimbach (Glatt) =

River in Baden-Württemberg

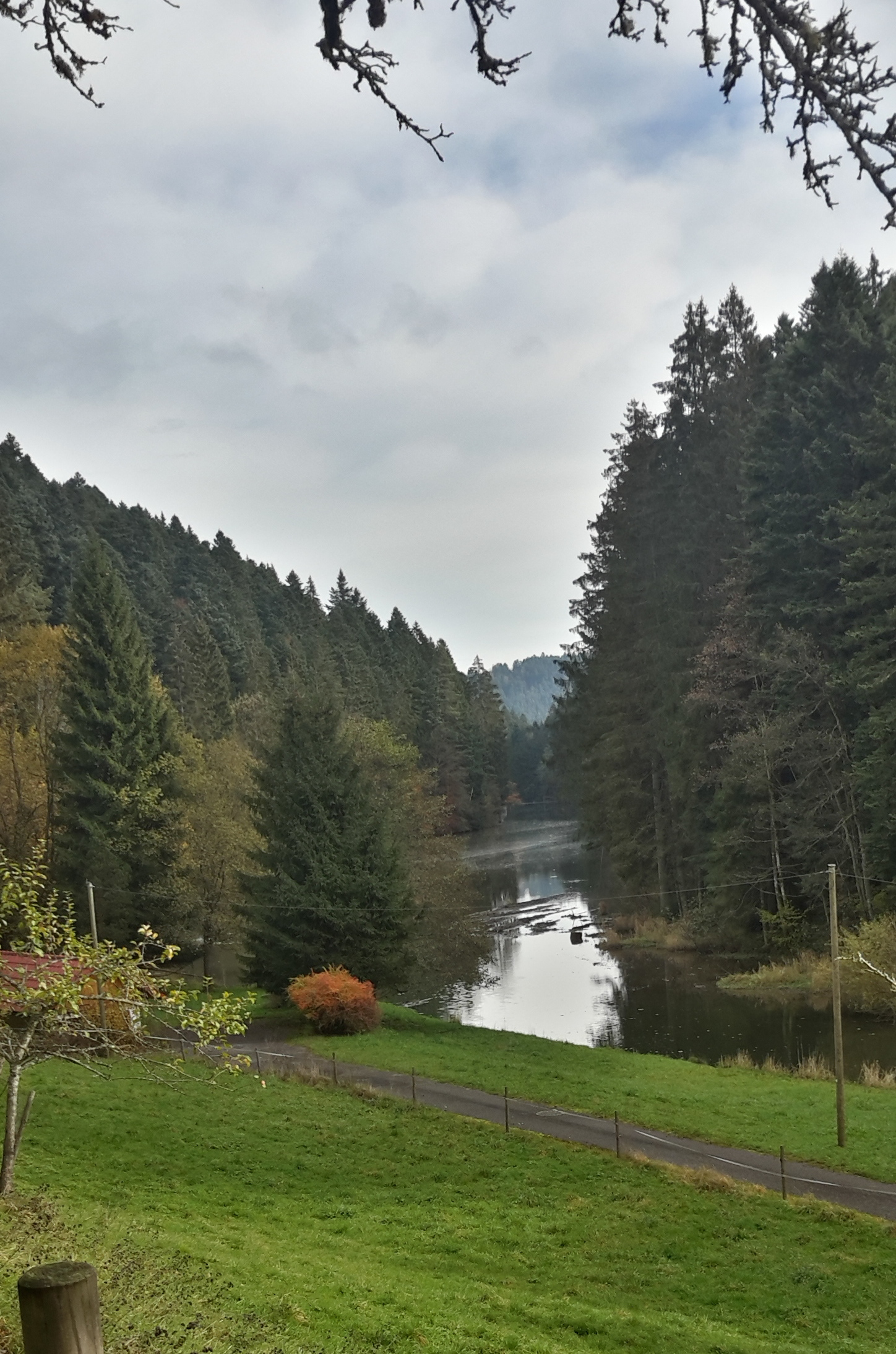

Location
- Country: Germany
- State: Baden-Württemberg

Physical characteristics
- Mouth
  - location: Glatt
  - coordinates: 48°23′30″N 8°32′31″E
- Length: 24.5 km (15.2 mi)

Basin features
- Progression: Glatt→ Neckar→ Rhine→ North Sea

Heimbach (German pronunciation: [ˈhaɪmbax]) is a river of Baden-Württemberg, Germany. It flows into the Glatt near Dornhan.

== Geography ==
=== Course ===
The Heimbach has its source southwest of the Schramberg district Waldmössingen in the district of Rottweil and then flows in a largely northern direction through the community Fluorn-Winzeln, past the Alpirsbach district Römlinsdorf and the Dornhan district Busenweiler. Afterwards it crosses the area of the Lossburg community. After the district Wälde the small river changes its direction of flow towards the east towards the Glatt. It now flows in an arc around the district Sterneck through a wooded valley, feeds a small dam below Sterneck, which is somewhat hidden in the woods, and then flows into the Glatt in the Dornhan district Leinstetten.

=== Catchment area ===
The Heimbach drains 77.4 km^{2} on the eastern edge of the Black Forest in a north-north-eastern direction to the Neckar tributary Glatt, which flows almost in the opposite direction. The catchment areas of the following rivers border in turn:

- in the north that of the short Lauter to the upstream Glatt
- in the east only that of the likewise short Zitzmannsbrunnenbach, further to the south that of the Neckar
- in the south the Eschach drains into the Neckar far above the Glatt
- in the west the upper Kinzig runs in front of its large arch almost contrary to the direction of the Heimbach.

=== Tributaries ===
from Source to mouth:

- unknown creek, (left), 1,29 km
- Schlierbach, (right), 1,48 km
- Tannbach (!), (left), 4,03 km
- Staffelbach, (left), 4,41 km
- Tannbach (!), (left), 2,18 km
- Grüblesquellenbach (left), 1,52 km
- Obelsbach, (left), 4,81 km
- Rossbach, (left), 1,98 km
- Leinbach, (left), 1,49 km
- Fuchsbach,(lleft), 1,91 km
- Türnenbach,(right), 2,96 km
- Wühlsbach, (left) 4,97 km

== See also ==
- List of rivers of Baden-Württemberg
