= Glatt (Neckar) =

River in Germany

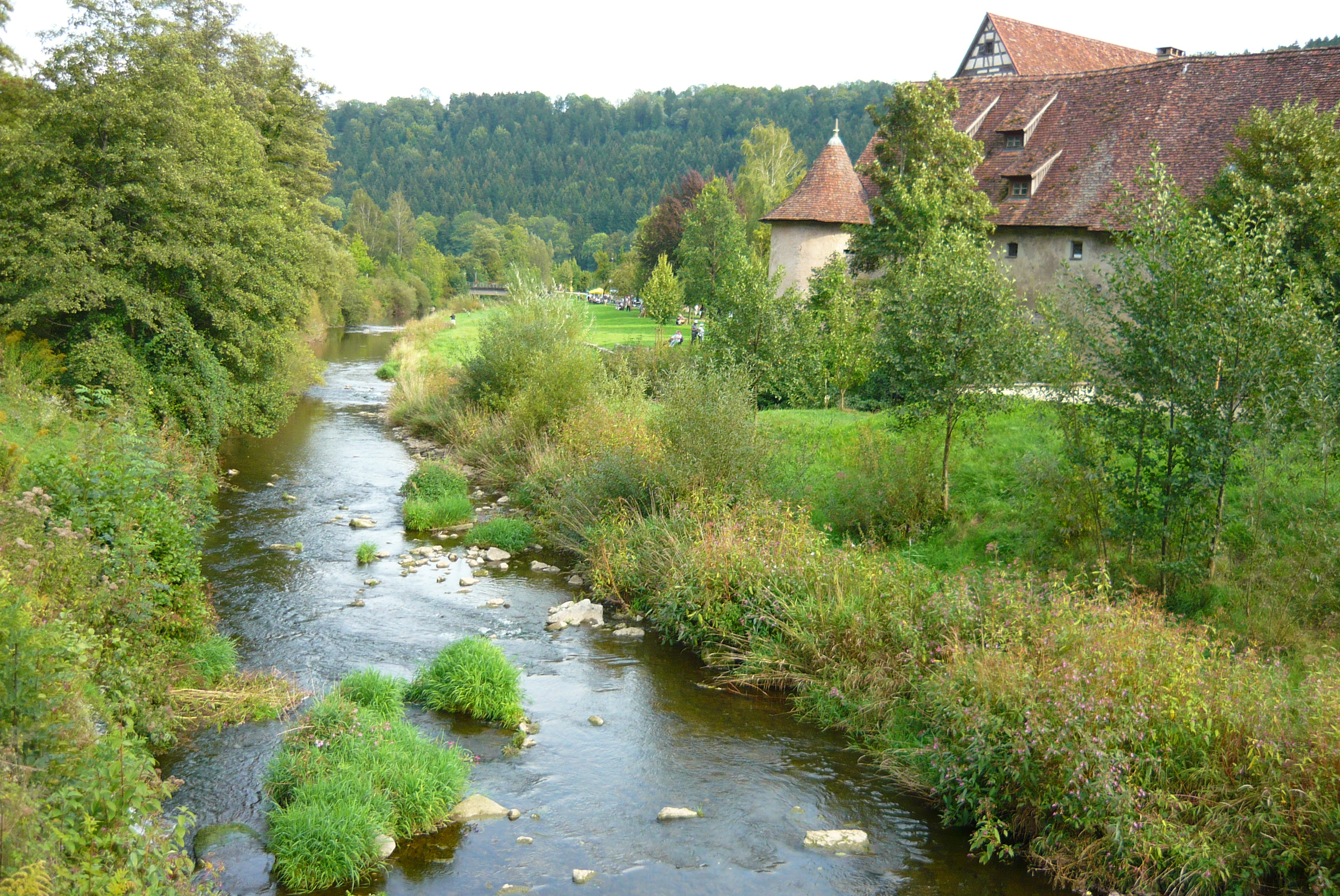
- River and watercastle Glatt

Location
- Country: Germany
- State: Baden-Württemberg

Physical characteristics
- Source
  - elevation: 716 m (2,349 ft)
- Mouth
  - location: Neckar
  - coordinates: 48.3968°N 8.6459°E
  - elevation: 403 m (1,322 ft)
- Length: 34.2 km (21.3 mi)
- Basin size: 234 km^{2} (90 sq mi)

Basin features
- Progression: Neckar→ Rhine→ North Sea

Glatt (German pronunciation: [ɡlat]; in its upper course: Kübelbach) is a river of Baden-Württemberg, Germany.

On its shore is the village Glatt, known for its watercastle. It ends in the territory of Horb am Neckar in the Neckar river.

== Geography ==
=== Source streams ===
The Glatt originates in the village Aach, a district of Dornstetten. Here, the left and northern upper reaches of the Kübelbach merge with the right Stockerbach coming from the northwest next to the Grüntaler Straße to form the Glatt. Both branches are between 8 and 9 km long.

The main upper course of the Glatt is the Kübelbach. Its own upper course up to the Silberwiesen before the first settlement Dornstetten-Hallwangen is called Glattbach. The source of Glattbach/Kübelbach is located at about 717 m above Sea Level in the Stutzwald at the community border of Dornstetten to Freudenstadt and is called Glattbrunnen. Glattbach as well as Kügelbach altogether have only few important tributaries.

The right upper course Stockerbach of the Glatt has its source on the other hand higher on about 753 m above sea level the Kratzenhartbrunnen, which is about 2 km west of the Glattbrunnen in the Reichenbacher Wald on Freudenstadt area. It is fed by a number of streams from the right, making its catchment area about one and a half times larger than that of its left partner.

Still in Aach, only two hundred meters after its origin from the right and west-northwest, the Glatt takes the "Ettenbach", which is only about 5 km long. (48°28′01.09″N 08°28′41.30″E) Its catchment area, however, exceeds that of the Kübelbach a little, which is why the Kübelbach, Stockerbach and Ettenbach are usually regarded as the three source branches that together make up the Glatt.

=== Course ===
After that, the Glatt flows in a south-eastern to southern direction and takes in some tributaries and flows into Glatten. On the section following its mouth the Glatt below Neuneck then runs through a very narrow and winding valley about 170 meters below the summit of the wooded Schellenberg 640 m above sea level. In Leinstetten, the largest Glatt tributary by far Heimbach, with its almost 25 km length, flows into the valley.

About 2 km further down the valley, the river turns left where the small tributary Zitzmannsbrunnenbach meets the Glatt in Bettenhausen to the east-northeast course. On the following, almost 10 km long run, only a somewhat more important stream flows into the valley. Then the Glatt flows below the village Glatt from Sulz am Neckar and opposite the district Neckarhausen from Horb am Neckar from the left into the upper Neckar.

=== Catchment area ===
The 234 km^{2} catchment area of the Glatt has roughly the contour of a triangle with a western base of about 31 km through the eastern Black Forest. This longest side extends from the northern tip east of Baiersbronn-Klosterreichenbach in the Reichenbacher Wald near the Krähenhartbrunnen, from which the right spring brook Stockerbach has its source, to the southern tip at Schramberg-Waldmössingen, which is close to the source of the largest tributary Heimbach. The catchment area is not even 17 km wide from this western side to the eastern tip at the estuary.

On the northeast side, the Nagold borders on the longest part of the catchment area, only finally towards the mouth to that of a less important downstream Neckar tributary. Beyond the entire southeastern watershed no major tributary runs to the nearby upstream Neckar. In the south and southwest, behind a short stretch of the catchment area boundary, the Eschach, which is roughly equivalent to the Glatt, flows to the Neckar. On the largest part of the western watershed the Kinzig collects the water running to the other side. Only at the Schöllkopf between Lossburg and Freudenstadt it is replaced there by the Murg (Northern Black Forest), which at first competes over its right tributary Forbach. Since the large Black Forest rivers Kinzig and Murg flow directly into the Rhine, the western watershed is also a large watershed between the Neckar and Rhine over almost its entire length.

Largest elevation in the catchment area is the mentioned Schöllkopf, which reaches a height of 843 m above sea level, and at whose eastern foot the second largest Glatt tributary Lauter has its source.

- Kübelbach with upper course Glattbach (left source stream, in Aach), 8.5 km and 11.4 km²
- Stockerbach (right source stream, in Aach), 8.3 km and 17.7 km²
- Ettenbach (right, in Aach), 5.7 km and 12.0 km²
- Schorngraben (from right), 0.9 km
- Nottentalgraben (from left), 0.9 km
- Mühlebach (from left, before Glatten), 2,2 km
- Bürgenbach (from left, in Glatten), 3.3 km and 5.5 km²
- Lauter (from right, in smooth), 10.2 km and 32.6 km²<! --BEZG-Total: 32,610= 9,479 +Manbach: 7,513 + 4,352 +Fischbach: 10,323 + 0,943-->
- Schlappbach (from left, near Böffingen), 1,2 km
- Riedhaldenbächle (from left, in ninepin), under 0.4 km
- Tälesbach (from left), 1.1 km
- Lippbach (from right), 6.0 km and 6.6 km²
- Heimbach (from the right, in Leinstetten), 24,5 km and 77,5 km
- Zitzmannsbrunnenbach (from right, in Bettenhausen), 4.1 km and 9.9 km²
- Nießler Bach (from left, near Reinau), 0.9 km
- Tobelbach (maybe also Dobelbach) (from right, opposite Hopfau), 4.7 km and 13.4 km²
- Wiesenbächle (from left, to Hopfau), 0.8 km
- (stream from Talerbrunnen) (from left), 1.0 km
- Tälebach (from right, in Glatt), 0.9 km

== See also ==
- List of rivers of Baden-Württemberg
