= German Timber-Frame Road =

Tourist route

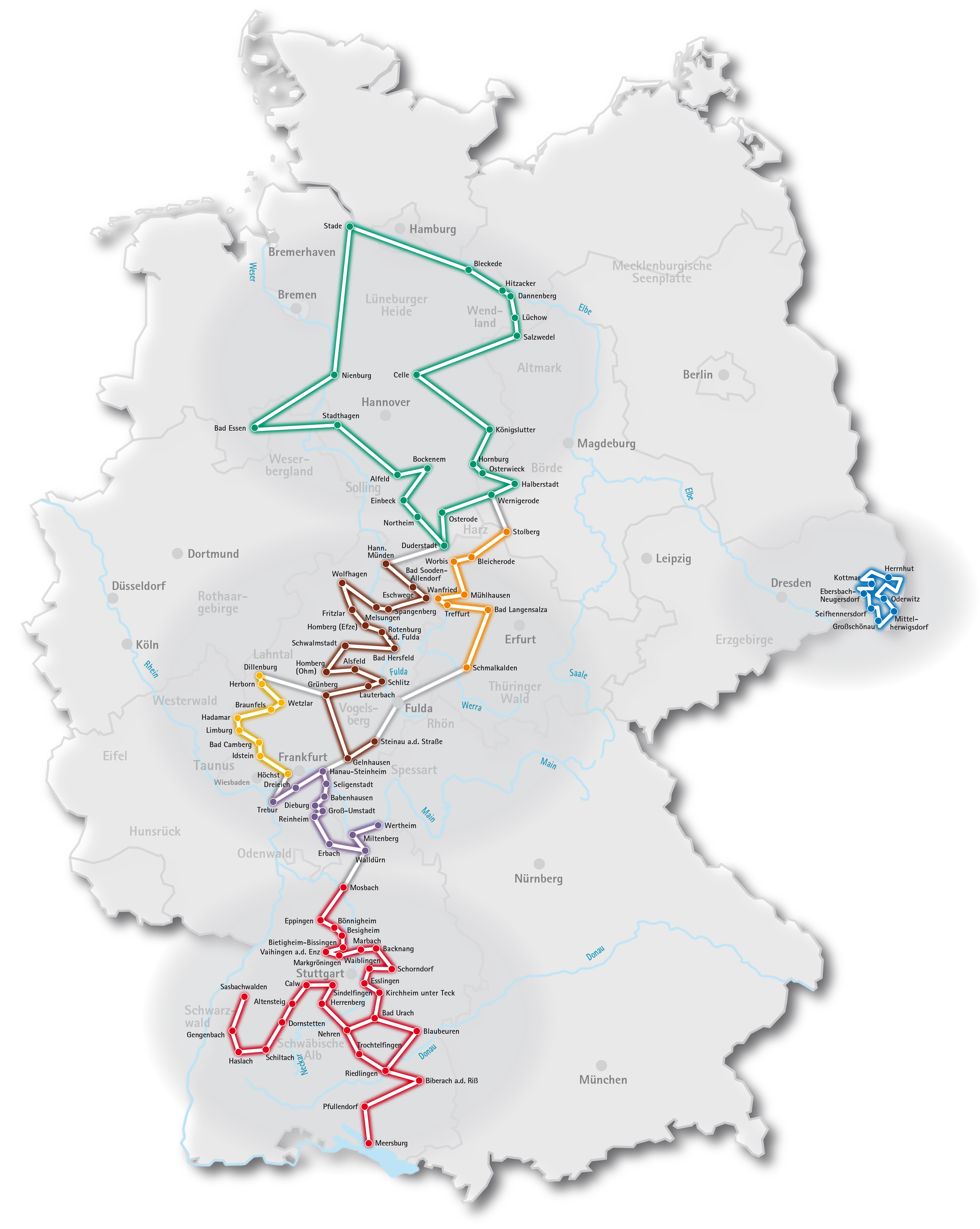
The road in its seven regional sections

The German Timber-Frame Road (German: Deutsche Fachwerkstraße) is a German tourist route leading from the river Elbe in the north to the Black Forest and Lake Constance in the south. Numerous cities and towns each with examples of the vernacular timber-framed houses traditional to the German states are situated along the road. The total length of the route is nearly 3,000 km (1,864 mi).

The route is divided into seven sections, each of which follow the traditional areas of: Lower Saxony, Saxony-Anhalt, Thuringia, Hesse, Bavaria, and Baden-Württemberg.

== History ==
In 1975, the 'ARGE Historische Fachwerkstädte e.V.' (Association of Historic Timber-Framed Towns) was founded. Its aim is to preserve the cultural heritage of a huge variety of different styles of half-timbering in Germany. To share this knowledge with other interested people, the 'German Timber-Frame Road' was founded in 1990. In the meantime, more than 100 timber-framed towns have joined up under the slogan "Timber-framed houses unite".

== Sights ==
The German Timber-Frame Road runs almost the entire length of Germany and therefore links many varied landscapes, historic cities and carefully restored sites and monuments. Numerous events, festivals and markets throughout the year are publicised as part of the route's attractions.

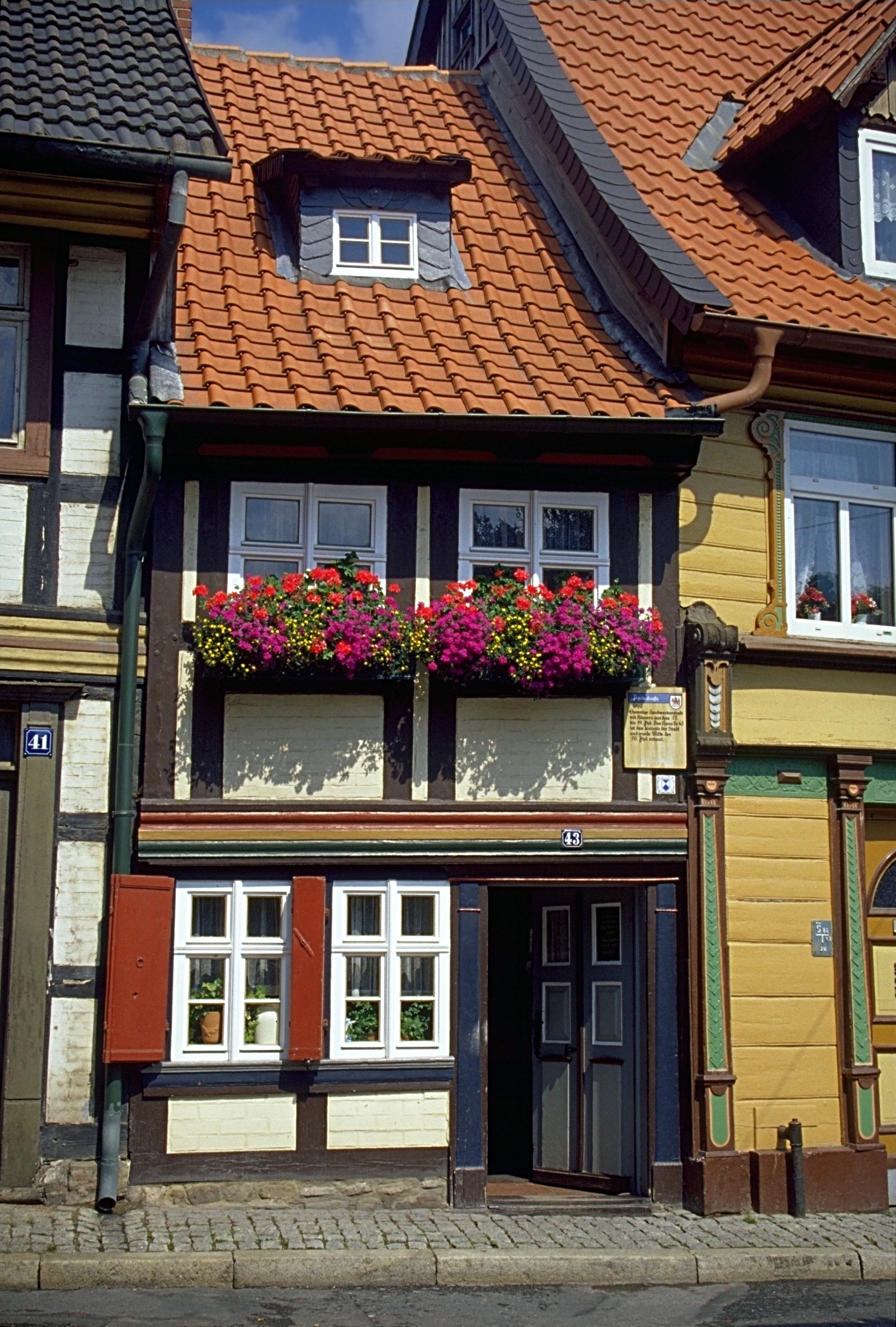
Smallest house in Wernigerode

== Regional routes ==
The German Timber-Frame Road is divided into the following seven regional sections, roughly from north to south:

- From the river Elbe to the Weser Uplands (marked blue on the map)

Stade - Nienburg, Lower Saxony - Bad Essen - Stadthagen - Northeim - Einbeck - Bad Gandersheim - Alfeld

- From the river Elbe plains to the Harz mountains (marked dark red on the map)

Bleckede - Hitzacker - Dannenberg - Lüchow - Salzwedel - Celle - Königslutter - Wolfenbüttel - Hornburg - Bockenem - Osterwieck - Halberstadt - Wernigerode - Osterode - Duderstadt

- From the Weser Uplands via Northern Hesse to the Vogelsberg mountains and the Spessart mountains (marked brown on the map)

Hannoversch Münden - Eschwege - Hessisch Lichtenau - Spangenberg - Melsungen - Wolfhagen - Bad Arolsen - Korbach - Fritzlar - Homberg (Efze) - Rotenburg an der Fulda - Bad Hersfeld - Schwalmstadt - Alsfeld - Schlitz - Lauterbach - Grünberg - Lich - Butzbach - Büdingen - Gelnhausen - Steinau an der Straße

- From the Harz mountains to the Thuringian Forest (marked orange on the map)

Stolberg - Bleicherode - Worbis - Mühlhausen - Wanfried - Treffurt - Bad Langensalza - Vacha - Schmalkalden

- From the river Lahn valley to the Rhine District (marked yellow on the map)

Dillenburg - Herborn - Wetzlar - Braunfels - Hadamar - Limburg - Bad Camberg - Idstein - Eltville

- From the river Rhine to the river Main and the Odenwald mountains (marked purple on the map)

Trebur - Dreieich - Hanau-Steinheim - Seligenstadt - Babenhausen - Dieburg - Groß-Umstadt - Wertheim - Miltenberg - Walldürn - Erbach - Reichelsheim

- From the river Neckar to the Black Forest and Lake Constance (marked red on the map)

Mosbach - Eppingen - Besigheim - Bietigheim-Bissingen - Vaihingen an der Enz - Markgröningen - Marbach - Backnang - Waiblingen - Schorndorf - Esslingen - Kirchheim unter Teck - Bad Urach
Here the route divides in a western part in the direction of the Black Forest, and a southern part in the direction of Lake Constance:
- Western Route: From Bad Urach to Herrenberg - Calw - Altensteig - Dornstetten - Schiltach - Haslach
- Southern route: From Bad Urach to Blaubeuren - Riedlingen - Biberach an der Riß - Pfullendorf - Meersburg

== Gallery ==
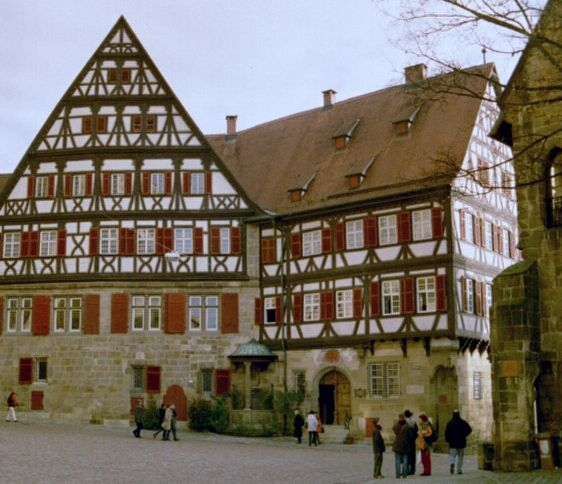
Speyrer Zehnthof in Esslingen am Neckar (Kesslerhaus)

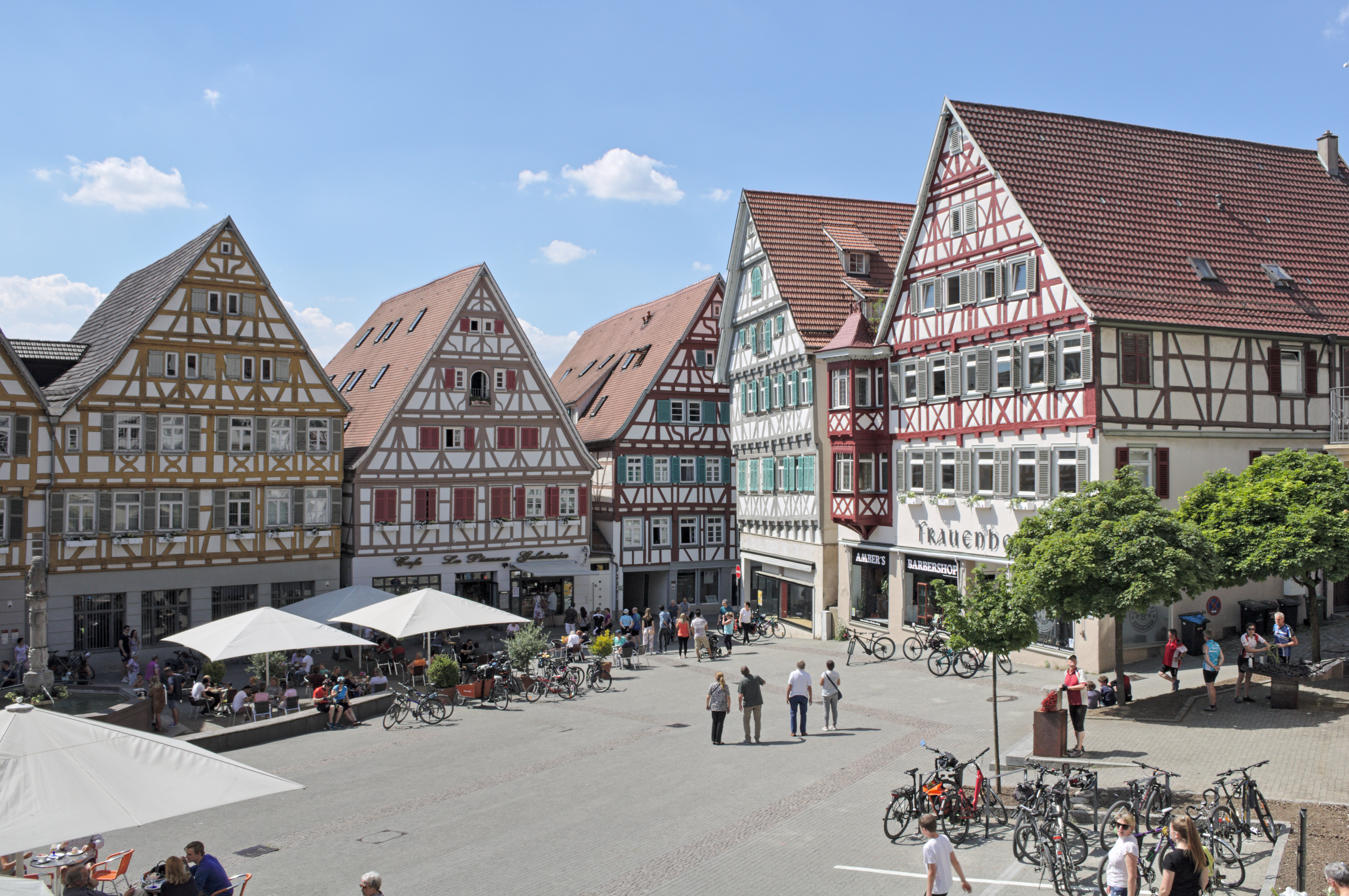
Marketplace in Herrenberg

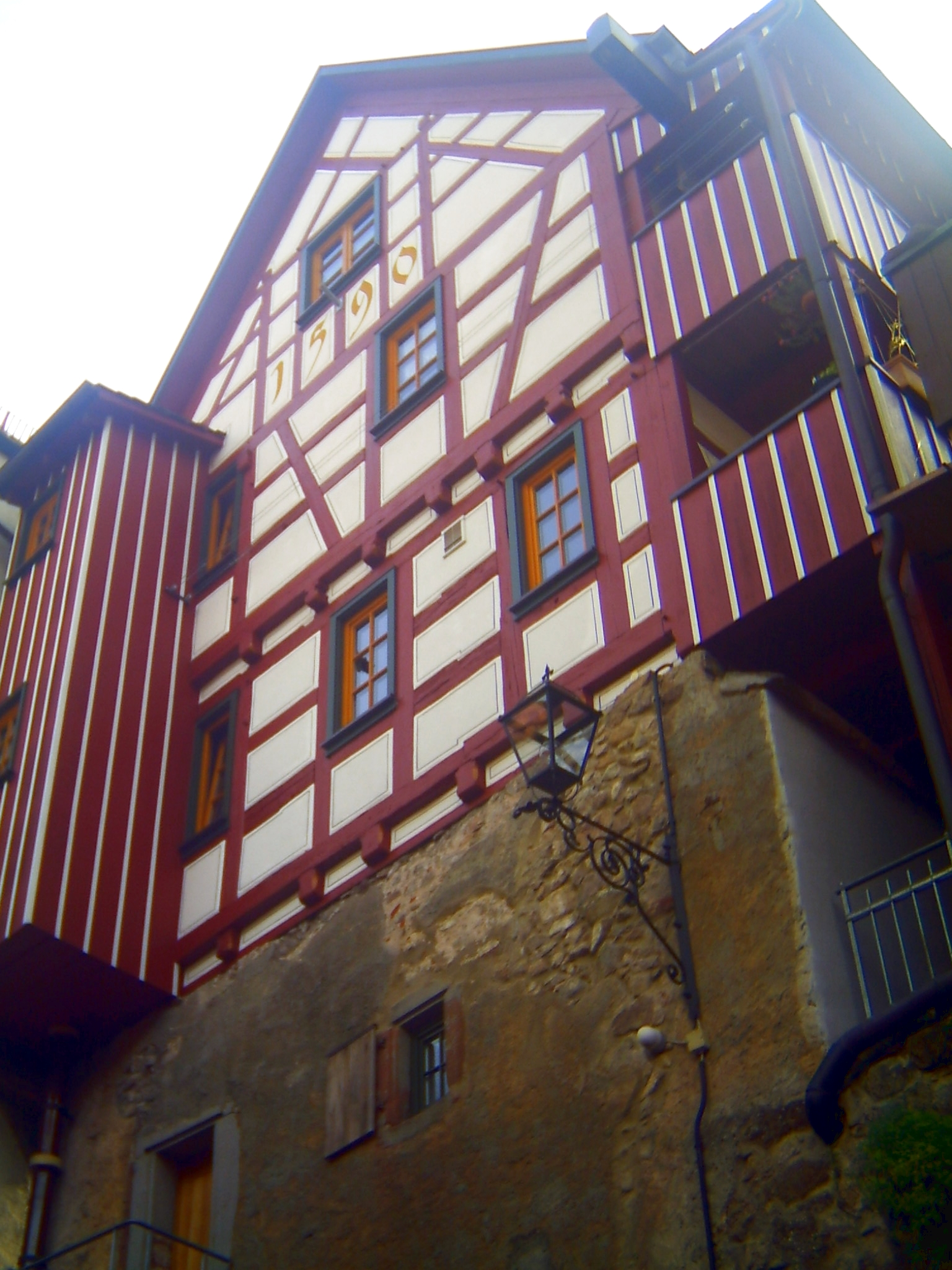
Jägerhäusle (Hunter's House) in Schiltach, built on the town wall in 1590

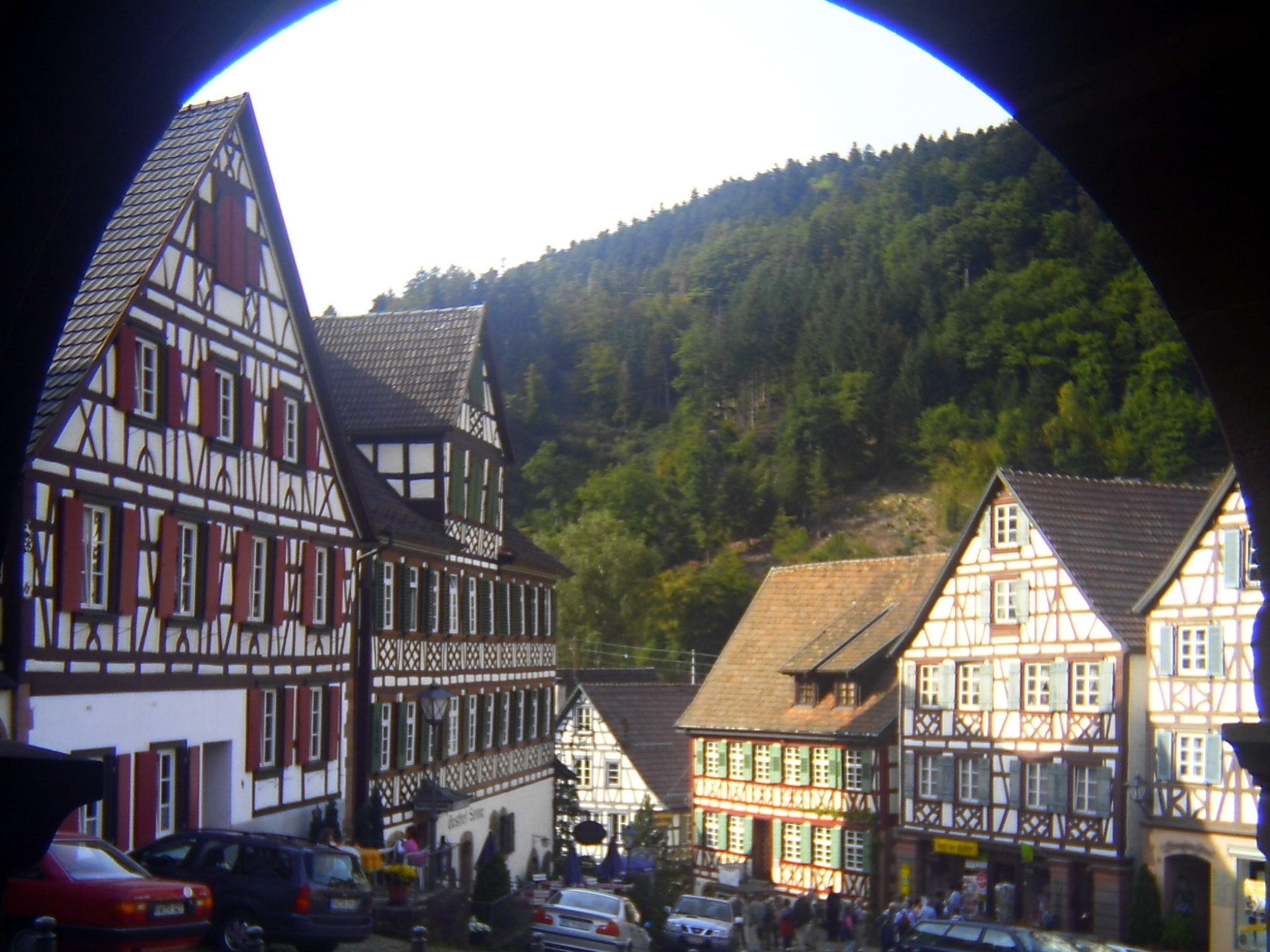
Marketplace in Schiltach (Black Forest)

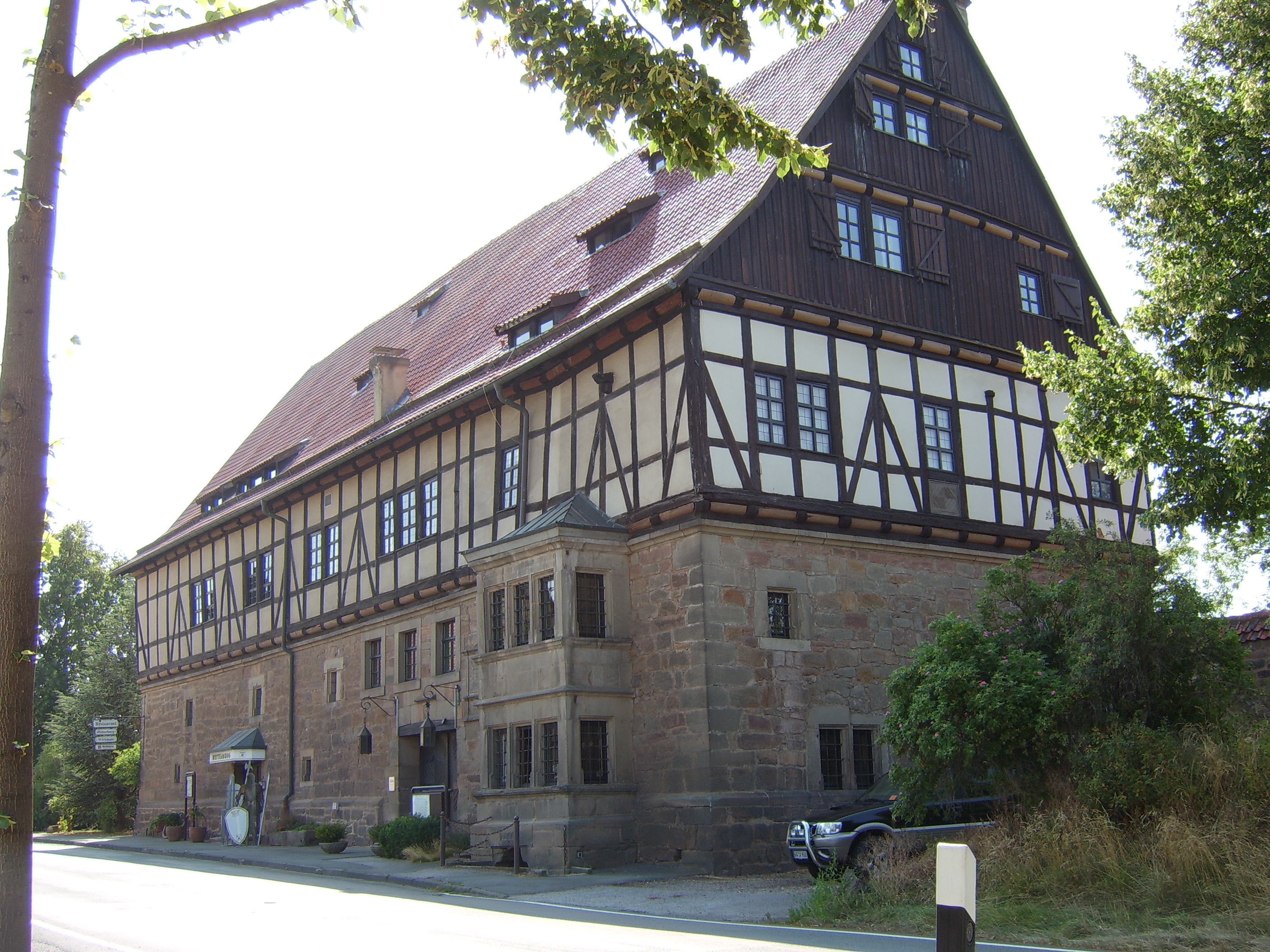
The Wetterburg near Bad Arolsen

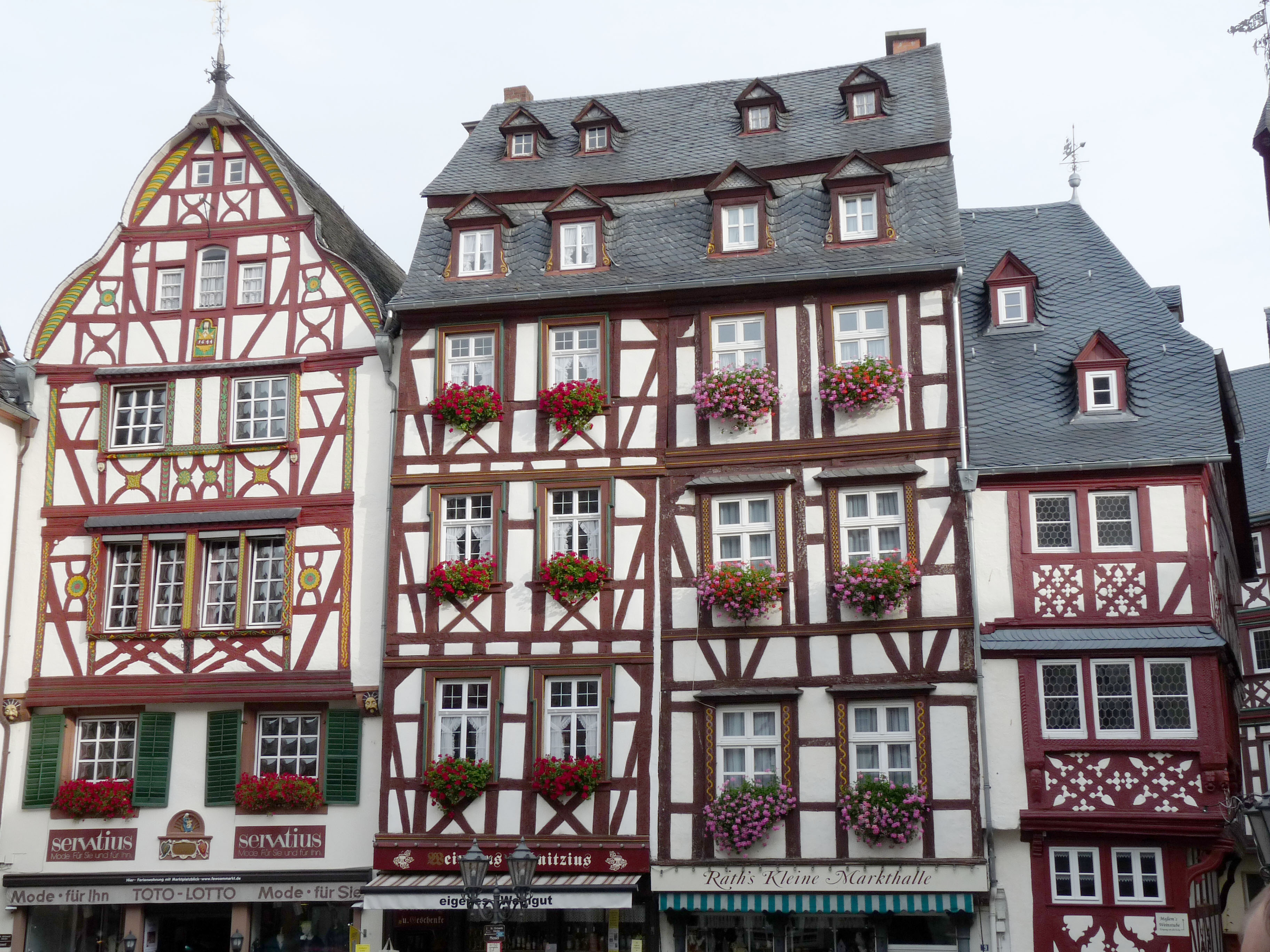
Market square of Bernkastel

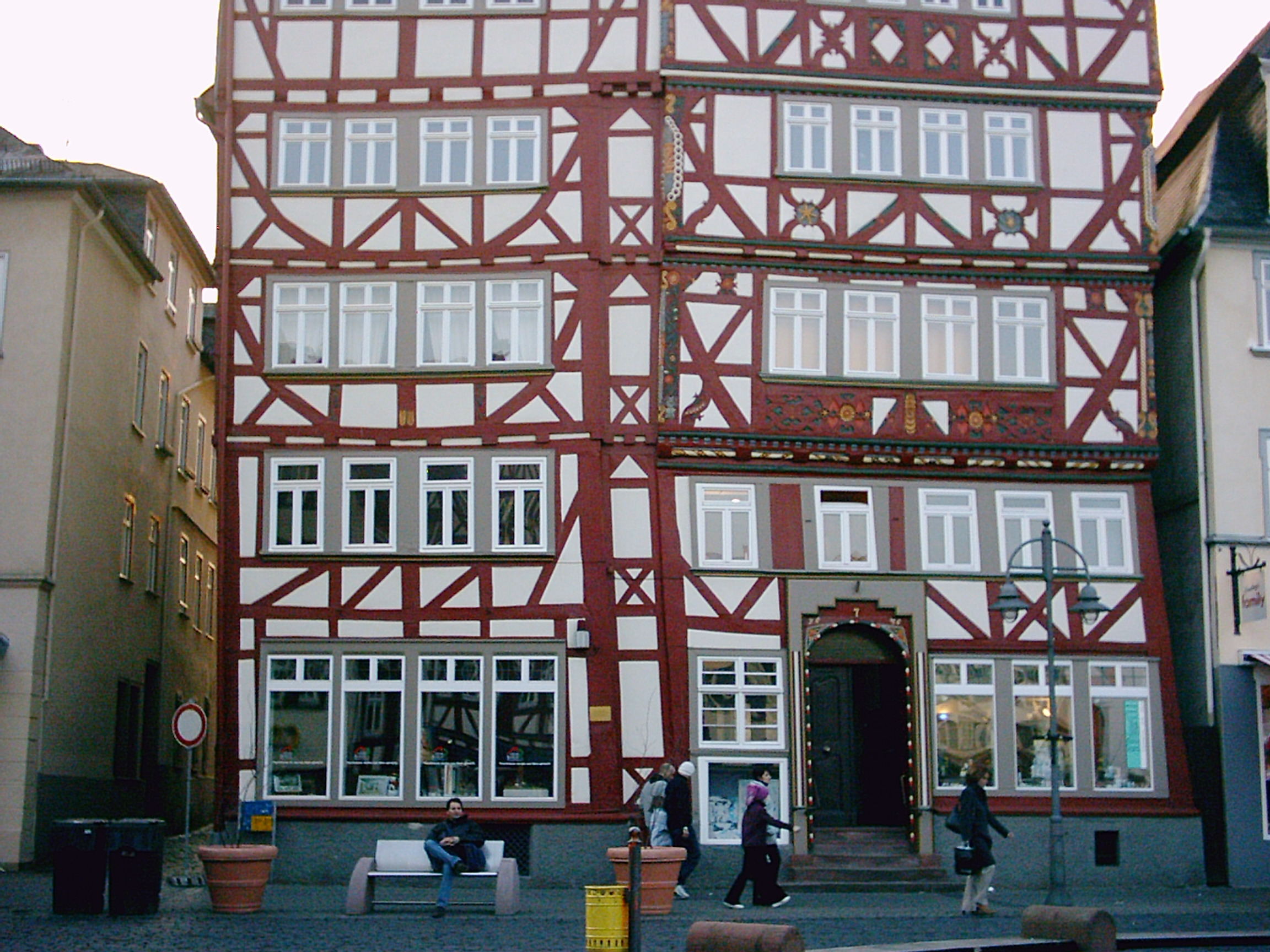
Timber-framed house at the marketplace in Butzbach, built in the 16th century

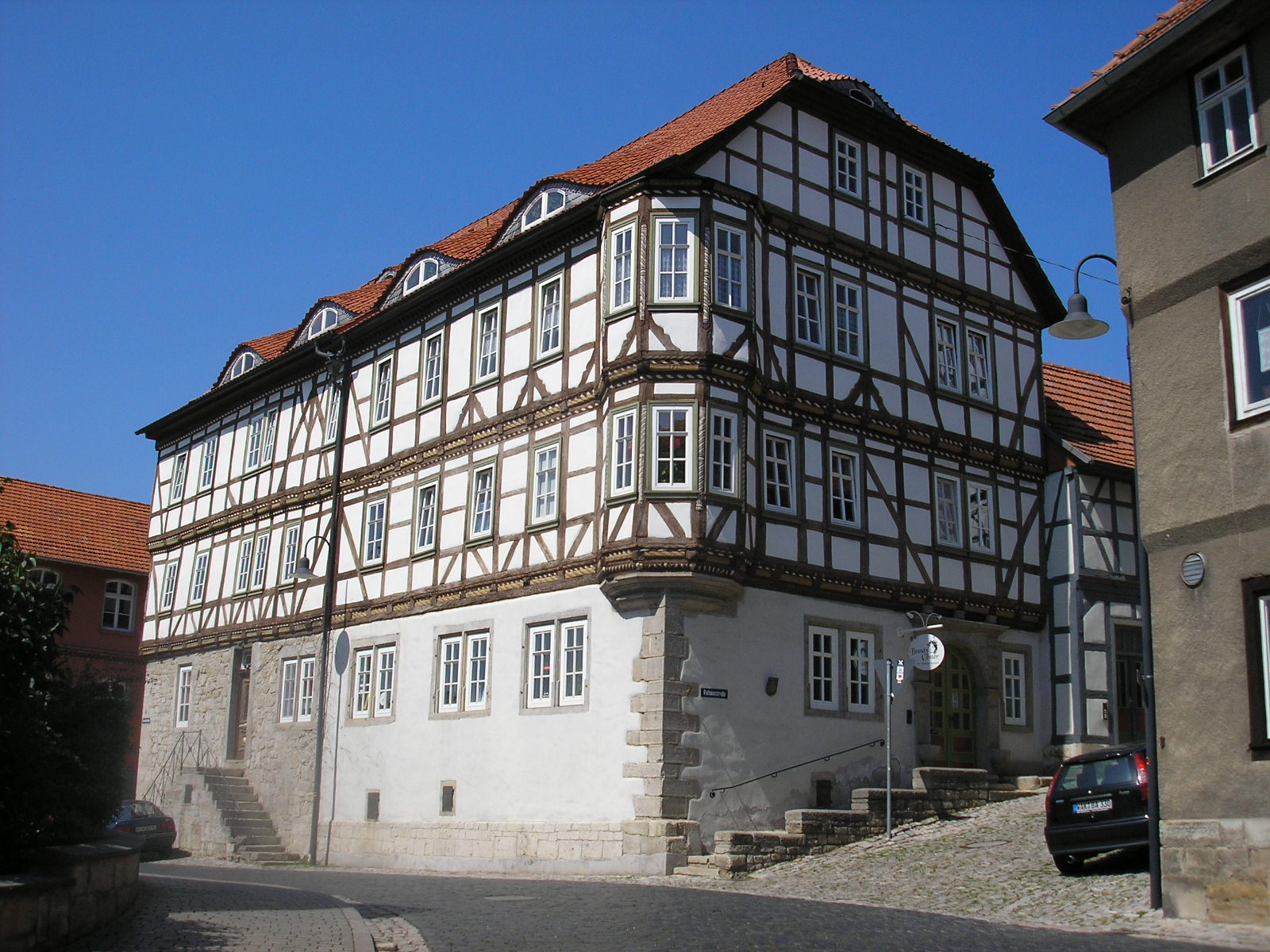
Box-on-the-ear house, Treffurt

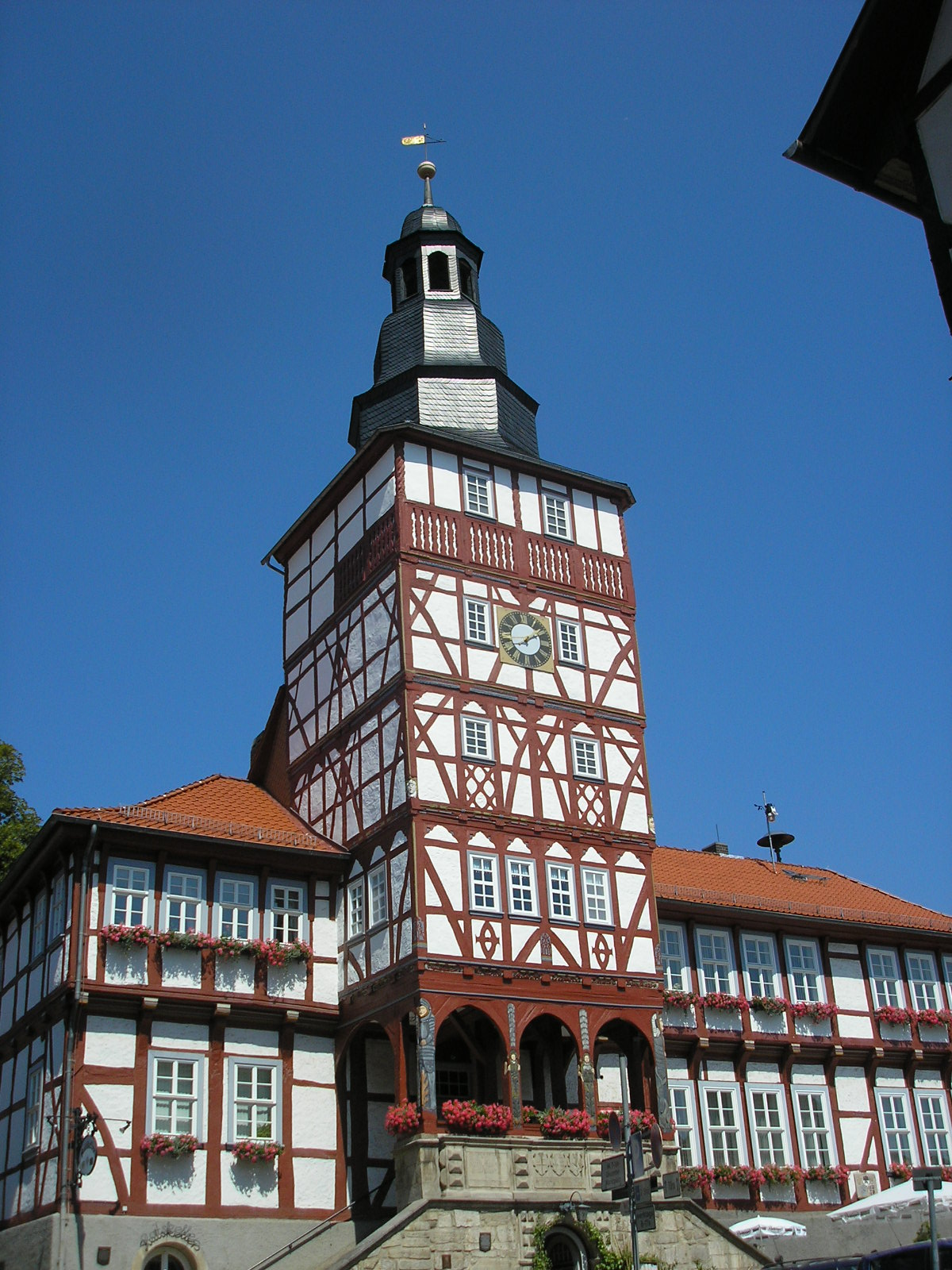
Town hall, Treffurt

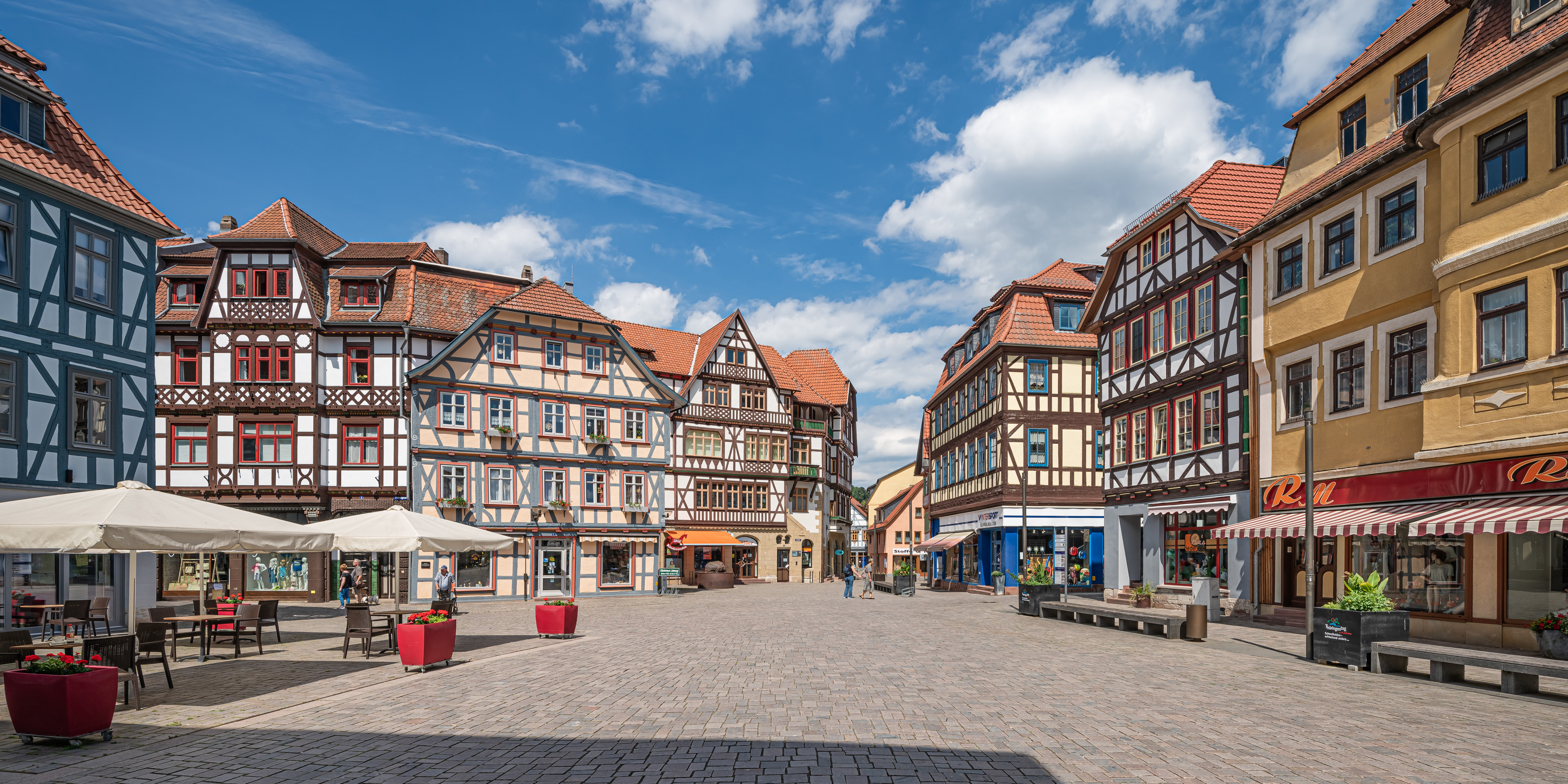
Salzbrücke, Schmalkalden

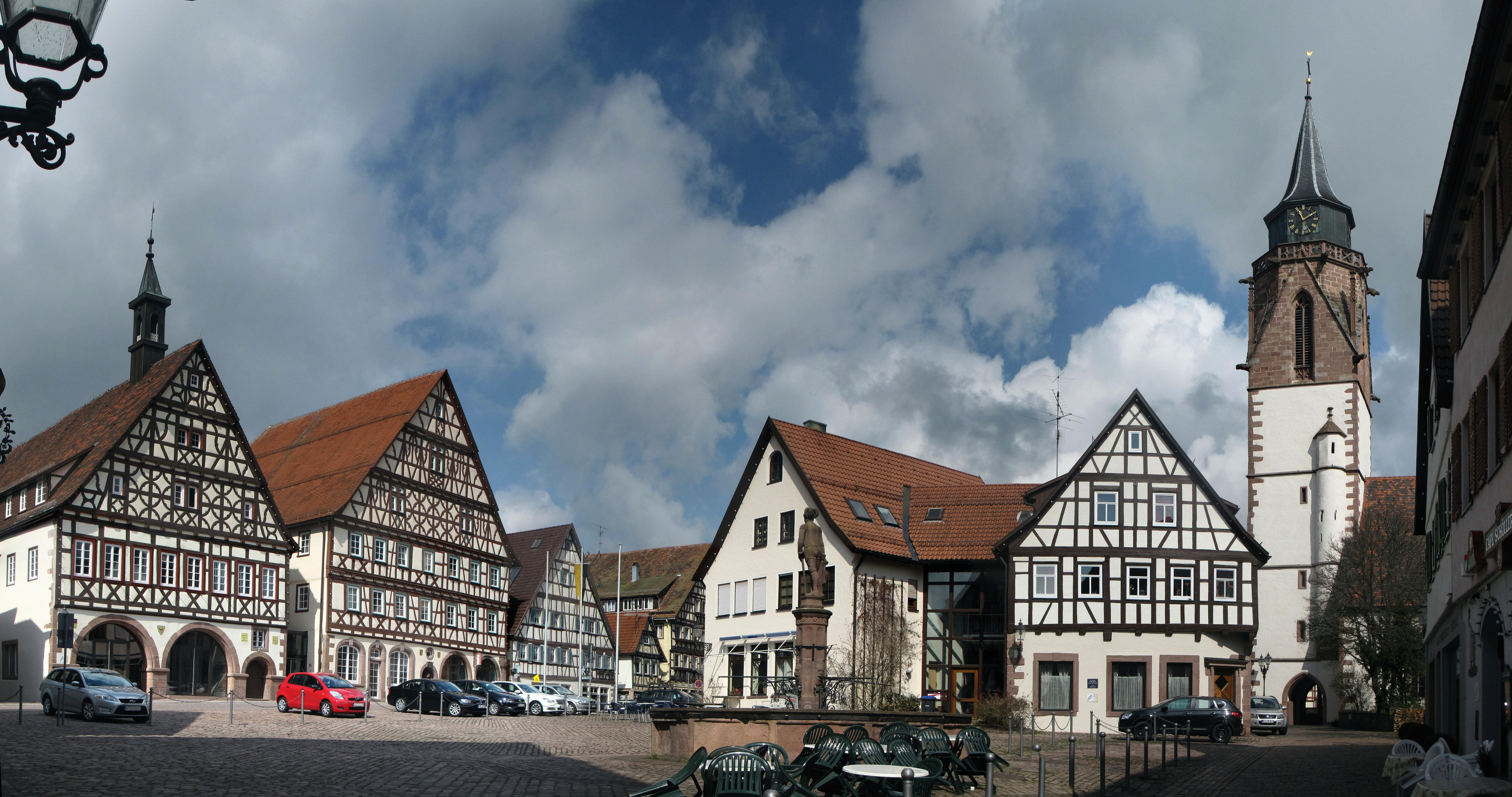
Market square, Dornstetten

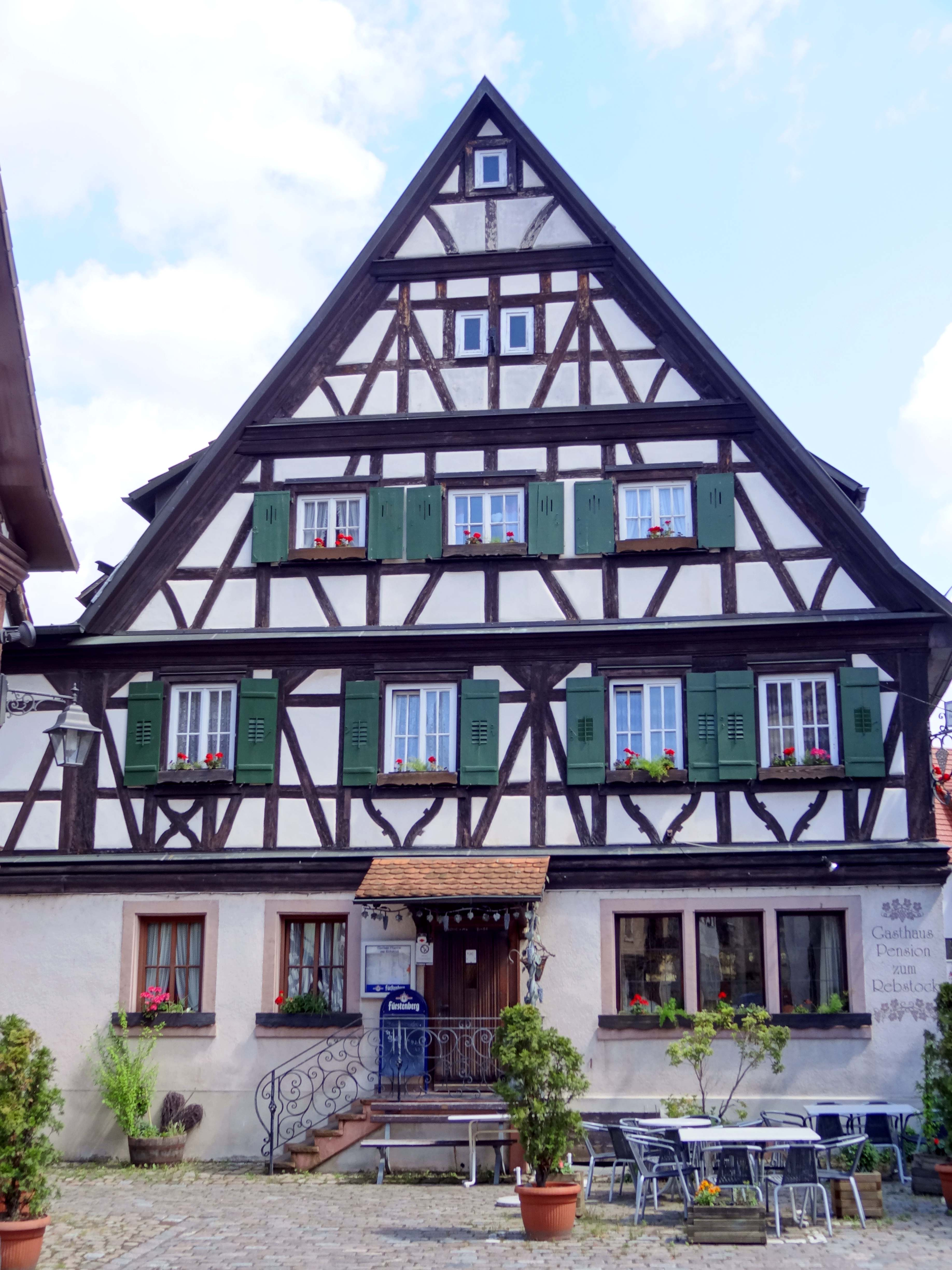
Gasthaus zum Rebstock (inn) in Haslach im Kinzigtal (Black Forest)

== See also ==
- Tourism in Germany
