= Dornhan =

- Town
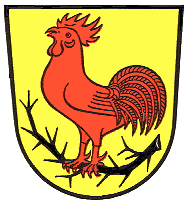
- Coat of arms

- Location of Dornhan within Rottweil district
- Interactive map of Dornhan
- Location within Germany Location within Baden-Württemberg
- Coordinates: 48°20′58″N 08°30′44″E
- Country: Germany
- State: Baden-Württemberg
- Admin. region: Freiburg
- District: Rottweil
- Subdivisions: 8 Stadtteile

Government
  - Mayor (2020–28): Markus Huber

Area
  - Total: 44.91 km^{2} (17.34 sq mi)
- Elevation: 642 m (2,106 ft)

Population (2025-12-31)
  - Total: 6,191
  - Density: 137.9/km^{2} (357.0/sq mi)
- Time zone: UTC+01:00 (CET)
  - Summer (DST): UTC+02:00 (CEST)
- Postal codes: 72173–72175
- Dialling codes: 07455, 07423
- Vehicle registration: RW
- Website: www.dornhan.de

Dornhan (German pronunciation: [ˈdɔʁnhaːn]) is a town in the district of Rottweil, in Baden-Württemberg, Germany. It is situated in the eastern Black Forest, 14 km southeast of Freudenstadt.

== Geography ==
=== Position ===
Dornhan is situated on a plateau in the Black Forest foothills above the valleys of Neckar and Glatt. Nearest bigger towns are Freudenstadt in the northwest, Rottweil and Oberndorf am Neckar in the southeast and Horb am Neckar in the northeast. The city area lies in 450 to 685 m above sea level.

=== neighbouring communities ===
Dornhan borders in the east on Sulz am Neckar, in the south on Oberndorf (both county of Rottweil), in the west on Alpirsbach and Loßburg and in the north on Glatten and Schopfloch (all Freudenstadt (district)).

=== Municipal Structure ===
To the city of Dornhan with the districts Bettenhausen, Busenweiler, Dornhan, Fürnsal, Leinstetten, Marschalkenzimmer and Weiden belong 15 villages, hamlets, farms and houses besides the city of Dornhan. The Busenweiler district includes the village Busenweiler and the hamlet Aischfeld. To the district Dornhan belong the town Dornhan, the hamlets Dobel and Gundelshausen, the farms Friedrichshof and Oberhart and the residential areas Brandeck and Braunhalden. The Fürnsal district includes the village of Fürnsal and the Fürnsaler Sägmühle residential area. The Leinstetten district includes the village Leinstetten and the hamlet Kaltenhof. Only the villages of the same name belong to the districts Bettenhausen, Marschalkenzimmer and Weiden. In the district Dornhan lies the Burgstall of Brandeck Castle and in the district of Leinstetten lies the ruins of the castle Lichtenfels.

== History ==
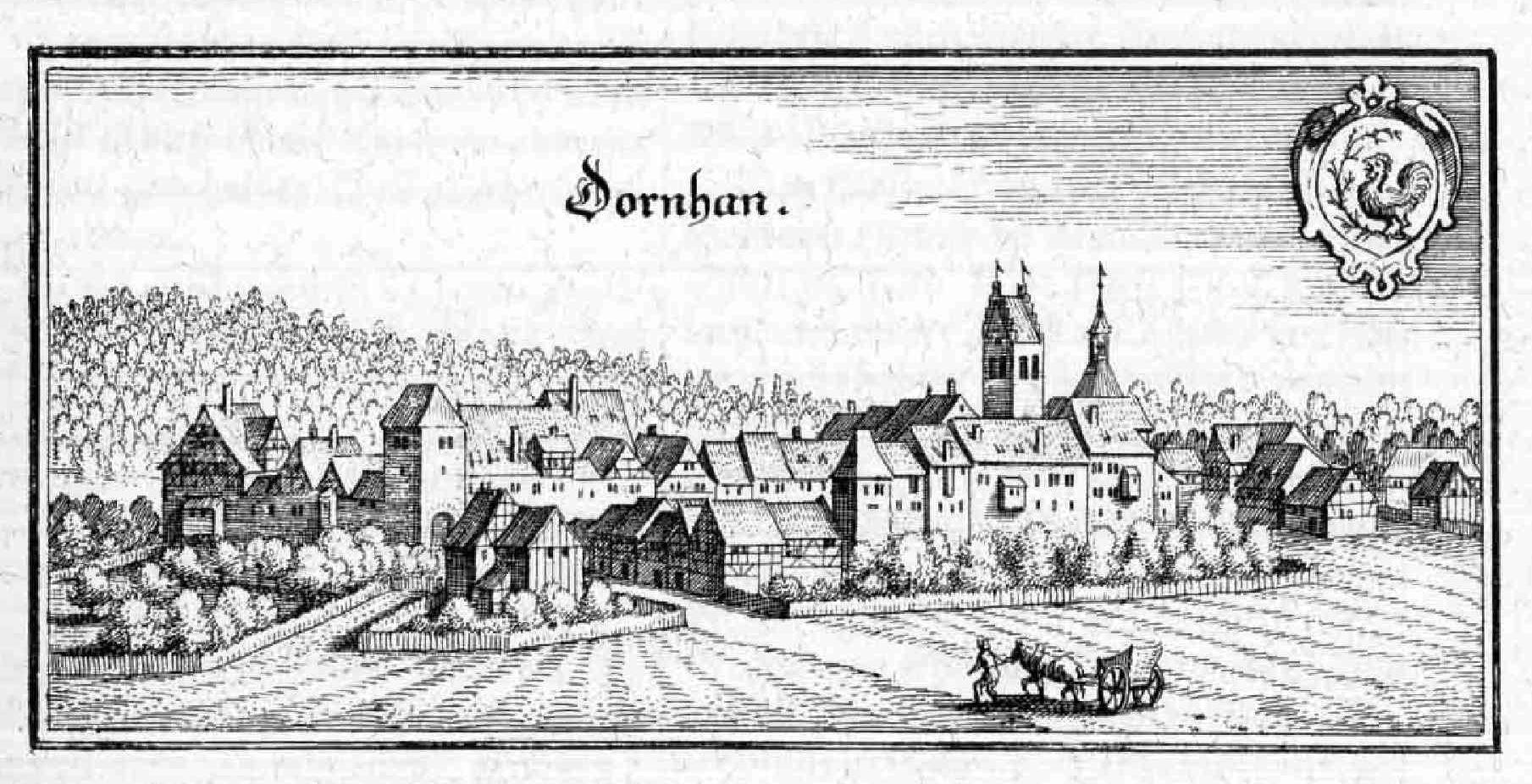
Dornhan – view from the Topograhiae Sueviae by Matthäus Merian 1643/1656

Dornhan was first mentioned in a document as "Turnheim" in 777, but the exact date of its becoming a town is unknown, although it is certain that the place has been called "civitas" (town) since 1276.

The town of Dornhan originally belonged to the Grafen von Sulz. 1095 the Alpirsbach Monastery received estates located in Dornhan by donation. The monastery gained more and more influence in Dornhan in the course of time and maintained a nursing home to administer the property. The abbot of Alpirsbach monastery had a court held in Dornhan three times a year, either personally or through a deputy. However, the monastery was only responsible for cases with lower jurisdiction, the high jurisdiction was the responsibility of the dukes of Teck, who held the hereditary bailiwick rights of the monastery. Because of his high debts, Duke Friedrich von Teck ceded the bailiwick rights to Count Eberhard den Greiner in 1380 and thus to Württemberg. From this time on, a Württemberg sheriff exercised the sovereign rights. With the reformation of the Alpirsbach monastery in 1534, Dornhan finally fell to Württemberg and was since then the seat of a Württemberg bailiff as the office of Dornhan until 1807.

In 1807 Dornhan came to the Oberamt Sulz, in 1808 to the Oberamt Alpirsbach and in 1810 again to the Oberamt Sulz.

During the administrative reform in during the NS period in Württemberg Dornhan came to the district of Horb in 1938. After the Second World War, the town of Dornhan fell into the French occupation zone and thus came to the newly founded state Württemberg-Hohenzollern in 1947, which was absorbed into the state of Baden-Württemberg in 1952.

In 1973, the District Reform in Baden-Württemberg took place, in which Dornhan became part of the district of Rottweil.

Today's town was newly formed on 1 March 1972 by merging the town of Dornhan with the communities of Bettenhausen, Fürnsal, Leinstetten and Marschalkenzimmer. On 1 April 1974, the previously independent community of Busenweiler was incorporated. The incorporation of Weiden took place on 1 January 1975.

== Politics ==
=== City council ===
The municipal elections on 26 May 2019 yielded the following result with a turnout of 61.6% (2014: 51.1%):

party/list	share of votes	seats	result 2014	'result 2009
voters' association	63.6%	12 (-1)	66,1 %	63,3 %
Citizens list	36.4%	7 (+1)	33,9 %	36,7 %

=== Mayor ===
On November 7, 2004, Markus Huber was elected mayor as of February 1, 2005 with 74 percent of the vote. The previous incumbent Günter Wößner (1973–2005) did not run for office in the election. Wößner's predecessor was Erich Blocher.

The next mayoral election took place on 11 November 2012, in which Markus Huber was the only candidate to receive 98% of the votes, making him mayor of Dornhan for another term of office.

=== Town twinning ===
Since 1994, Dornhan has maintained partnership relations with the French community Pont-de-Vaux in the Auvergne-Rhône-Alpes region.

== Culture and sightseeing ==
=== Buildings ===
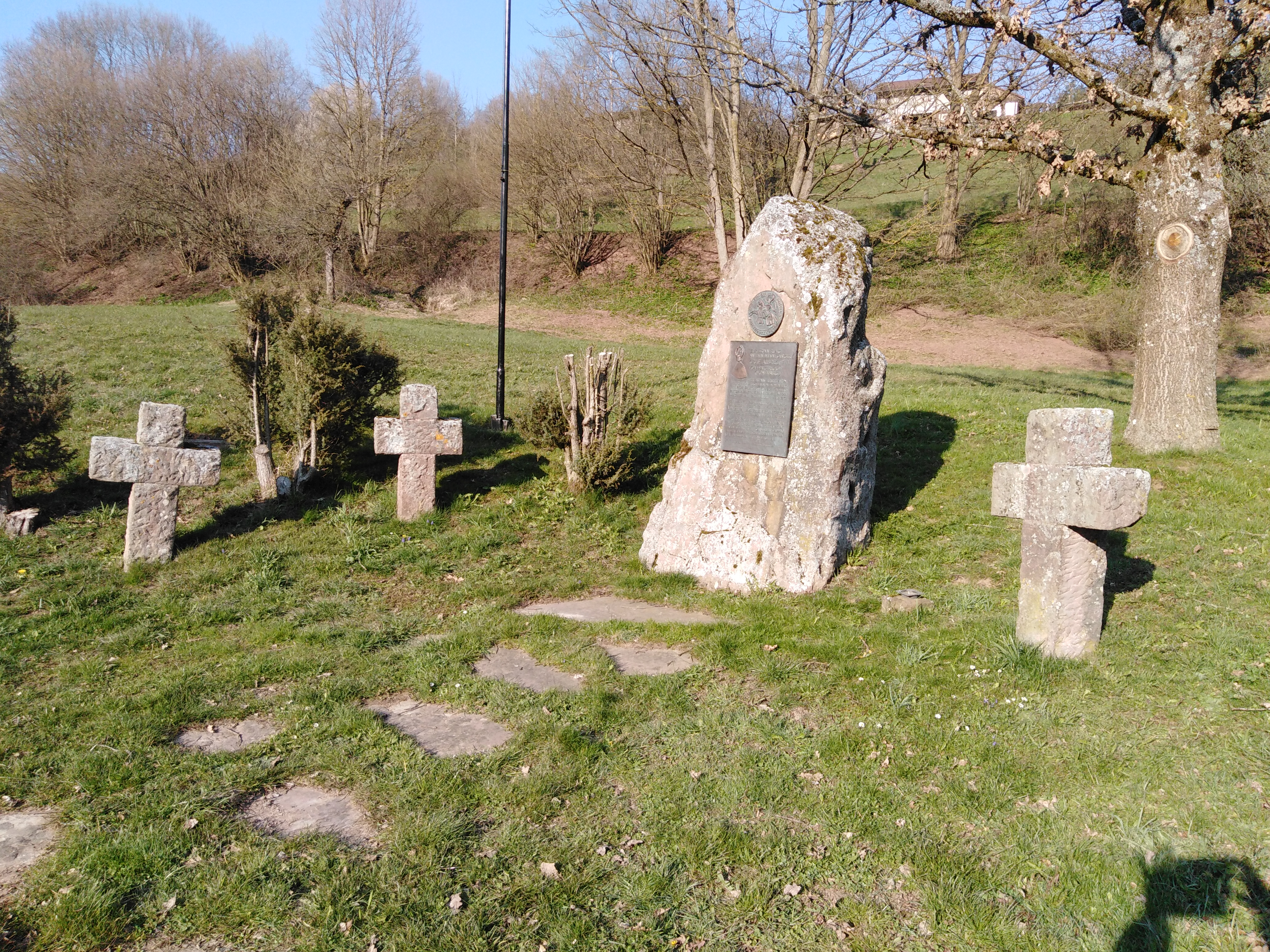
Dornhan-Leinstetten Denkmal Albrechts II von Hohenberg

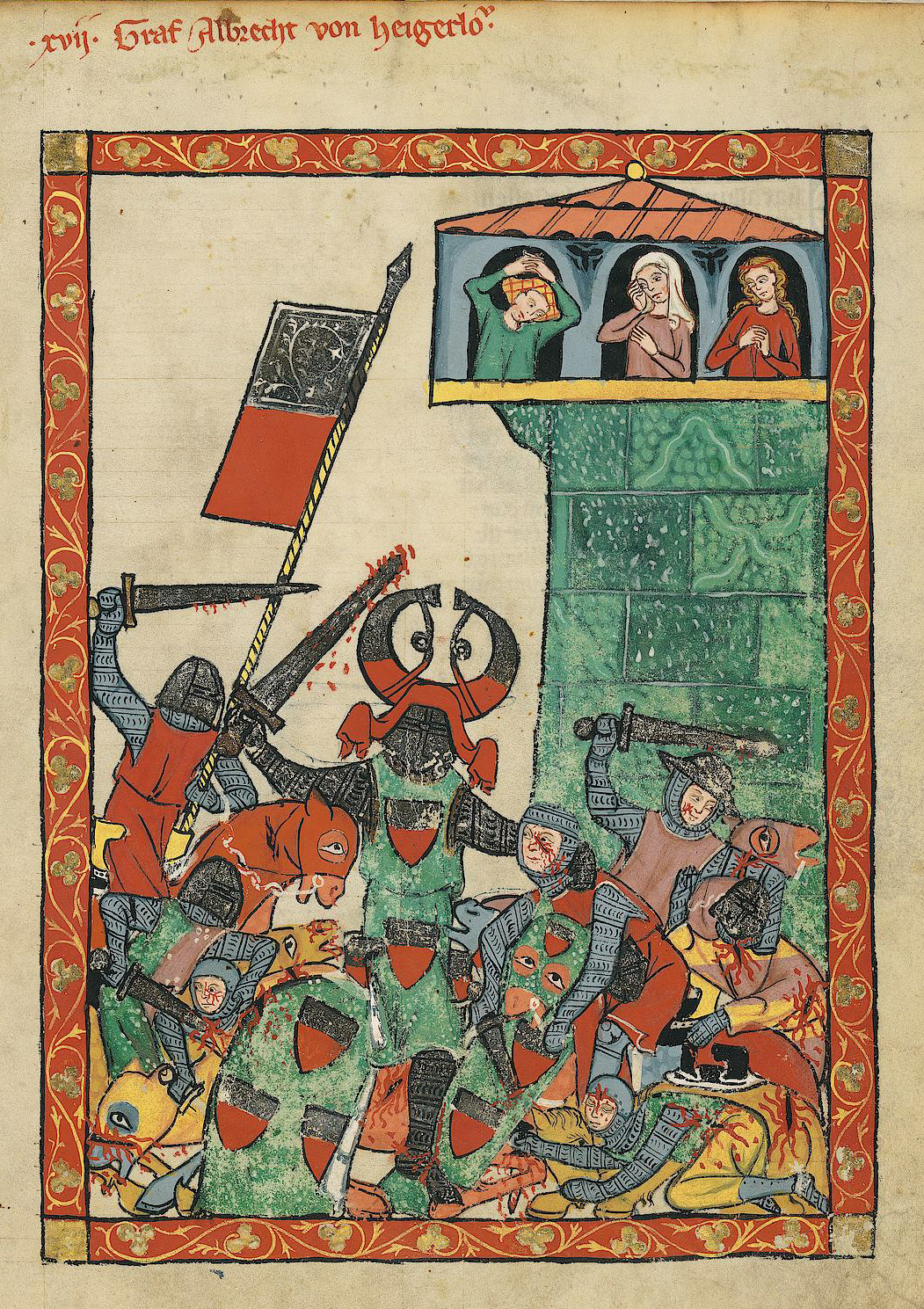
Codex Manesse Albrecht von Haigerloch

In the Zitzmannsbrunnenbach Valley (also known as Bettenhauser Valley) between Dornhan and Bettenhausen is the so-called Wasserhäusle, a fully preserved pumping station dating from 1889, which was the origin and part of Dornhan's water supply.

In Bettenhausen there is also a portrait of the risen Christ in the church of St. Konrad, which Hans Marx von Bubenhofen donated in 1596. The alliance coat of arms of the founder couple and the coats of arms of their ancestors provide the frame for the painting.

The ruins of Lichtenfels Castle, Brandeck Castle and Leinstetten Castle are located on the municipal boundary mark.

In Leinstetten, the minstrel monument commemorates Count Albrecht von Hohenberg (Haigerloch), who fell in the battle of Leinstetten on 17 April 1298. Albrecht von Hohenberg is depicted in the Codex Manesse in battle. There the only two verses handed down by him are preserved. The grave of Count Albrecht II of Hohenberg and his second wife Margareta of Fürstenberg is in Kirchberg Monastery near Sulz am Neckar.

In the district of Weiden there is a church from the 15th century and the birthplace of Hermann Römpp as well as the primary school, which is already over 100 years old.

== Economy and infrastructure ==
=== Education ===
In the Dornhans school centre there is a primary school and a secondary school. In the districts Leinstetten, Marschalkenzimmer and Weiden there is one primary school each. Gymnasium and secondary schools are available in the nearby towns of Oberndorf and Sulz.

=== Electricity supply ===
In the district of Bettenhausen im Glatttal there is a hydroelectric power plant fed from the Heimbach reservoir at Loßburg-Sterneck, which was originally also operated as a pumped storage power plant.

== Notable people born in Dornhan ==
- Johann Gottlob Christoph von Seeger (1767–1835), Württemberg senior official, member of the state parliament
- Wilhelm Friedrich Wagner (1802–1882), merchant in Odessa
- Edmund von Sigel (1805–1866), Protestant theologian, General Superintendent of Heilbronn
- John Buehler, former Johann Bühler (1831–1899), Director of the State Bank of Chicago and Senator of the State of Illinois
- Hans Holzwarth (1877–1953), gas turbine inventor
- Hermann Römpp (1901–1964), born in Weiden, chemist and scientific author
- Anton Reinhardt (1927–1945), born in Weiden, victim of the NS regime
- Klaus Graf (born 1969), racing driver
