= Heimbach Group =

Heimbach
- Founded: 1811; 215 years ago
- Founder: Thomas Josef Heimbach
- Headquarters: Düren, Germany
- Products: Textile
- Owner: Independent; (1811–2023); Albany International; (2023–present)
- Website: www.heimbach.com/en/heimbach-group/

The Heimbach Group is a supplier of textiles for the paper manufacturing, environmental technology and other industries. With production sites across Europe, it produces industrial textiles and filtration materials for various applications.

In addition to manufacturing products at its headquarters, Düren (Germany), it maintains paper machine textile manufacturing sites at Burgos (Spain), Neu-Moresnet (Belgium), Manchester (England) and Suzhou (China).

The technical textile division based in Neu-Moresnet, with production in Merone and Limbiate, Italy.

On August 31, 2023, Albany International completed the purchase of Heimbach for €132 million, in addition to assuming another €22 million in net debt.

== History ==
The Heimbach Group was founded in 1811 by Thomas Josef Heimbach, who was mayor of Düren (1848-1853). In 1871, they acquired a local manufacturer named Krutzmühle, and began specializing in the production of felt for paper-making machines. By 1900, they were the largest producer of such felt in Europe.

Twenty years before it acquired a Swiss company, Munzinger AG, it suffered from a fire that destroyed most of its facilities in 1904, leading to a major rebuild. Although it was one of a number of German companies decimated by the effects of World War II, the Heimbach Group rebuilt itself and continued to expand.

During the 1960s Heimbach made contributions to the advanced needling manufacturing technique. In 1969 Heimbach founded Heimbach Ibérica S.A. based in Spain. Just one year later, Heimbach incorporated Bruch&Cie. based in Belgium, which is today known as Heimbach Specialities AG.

Following this, it founded the companies Swiss Wire Ireland Ltd. (Ireland) and the Atlanta Felt Company (USA) in 1974 and 1980 respectively. In 1991, Heimbach entered into a partnership with the Canadian JWI Group and bought the English company CH Johnson Ltd., which is today better known as Heimbach UK Ltd.

In 2001, it initially divested its filtration division as a company affiliate followed to be an independent acting company in 2007 located at the company premises in Mariaweiler, Düren. Heimbach Filtration currently employs approximately 100 people and achieved and estimated turnover of €20 million in 2012.

In 2006, it founded Heimbach Asia (Singapore) Pte. Ltd., a Singapore-based sales and marketing company serving emerging markets in Asia. Heimbach achieved the global market leadership in the field of woven press pads with application in the wood processing industry, e.g. furniture and laminate flooring, by acquiring Marathon Belting Ltd. based in Manchester, UK.

In 2008, Heimbach further extended its market position in the filtration and technical textiles product segments through additional company acquisitions in South America and Europe. The following year, the company inaugurated a new manufacturing facility in Suzhou, China, producing paper machine textiles for the entire Asian-Pacific market.

In August 2023, the German company was acquired by Albany International.
