= Dornstetten =

- Town
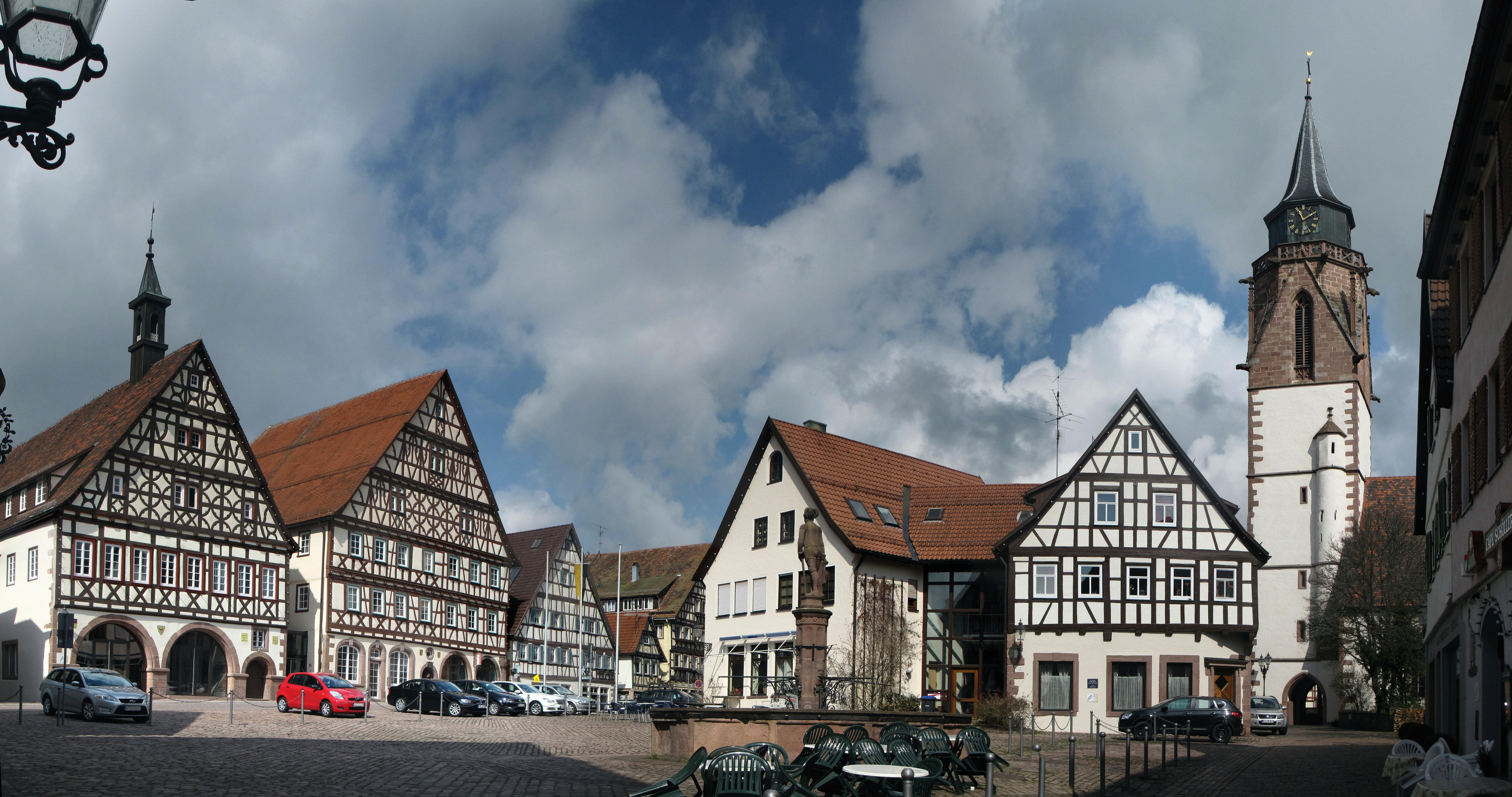

- Coat of arms

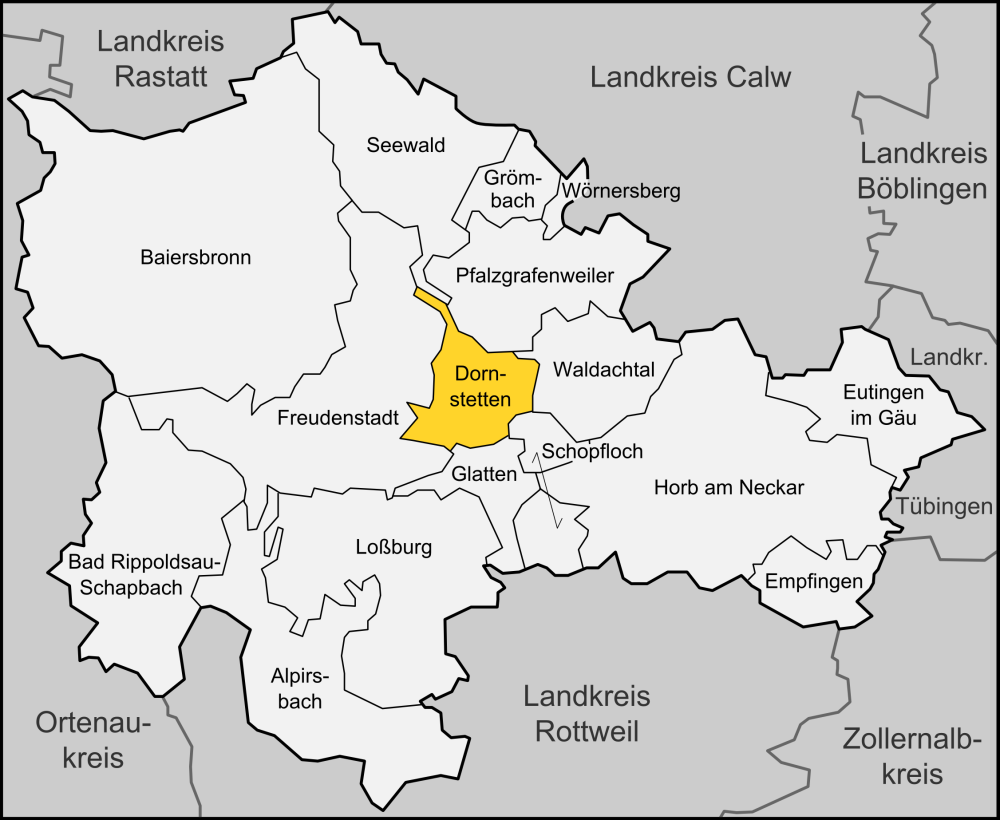
- Location of Dornstetten within Freudenstadt district
- Interactive map of Dornstetten
- Location within Germany Location within Baden-Württemberg
- Coordinates: 48°28′N 8°30′E
- Country: Germany
- State: Baden-Württemberg
- Admin. region: Karlsruhe
- District: Freudenstadt

Government
  - Mayor (2020–28): Bernhard Haas

Area
  - Total: 24.2 km^{2} (9.3 sq mi)
- Elevation: 621 m (2,037 ft)

Population (2025-12-31)
  - Total: 8,192
  - Density: 339/km^{2} (877/sq mi)
- Time zone: UTC+01:00 (CET)
  - Summer (DST): UTC+02:00 (CEST)
- Postal codes: 72280
- Dialling codes: 07443
- Vehicle registration: FDS, HCH, HOR, WOL
- Website: www.dornstetten.de

Dornstetten (German pronunciation: [dɔʁnˈʃtɛtn̩]) is a town in the district of Freudenstadt in Baden-Württemberg in southern Germany. It is situated in the Black Forest, 7 km (4.3 mi) east of Freudenstadt. It was founded in the early Middle Ages and is well known for its half-timbered houses (German: Fachwerkhäuser).

== Geography ==
Dornstetten is located in the northern Black Forest. The Glatt arises in the outlying village of Aach, at the confluence of the streams Ettenbach, Stockerbach, and Kübelbach.

=== Constituent communities ===
The municipality of Dornstetten was created in 1975 as part of a major reorganization of communities in Baden-Württemberg. It consists of the original town of Dornstetten (which included Dornstetten and the farmstead Lattenberg), the former municipality of Aach (included the village of Aach and the farmstead Benzinger Hof), and the former municipality of Hallwangen (simply the village of Hallwangen).
The area around Dornstetten also included the former settlements of Brennenweiler, Bühlerhof, and Diffenthal or Niedertall, which no longer exist.

== History ==
Dornstetten is first documented in the year 767 (1259 years ago) in the Lorsch Codex, as part of the Waldgeding of the Upper Glatt Valley, a loose confederation of settlements roughly corresponding to the modern municipal area. The town received city rights sometime between 1267 and 1276. At that time, Dornstetten belonged to the Counts of Urach-Fürstenberg. After passing through the hands of the Counts of Hohenberg, it was acquired by Württemberg in 1320. A school is first mentioned in the town in 1461. In 1755, Dornstetten was made seat of the Oberamt of Dornstetten, an administrative district that was nevertheless dissolved in 1807 and incorporated in the Oberamt of Freudenstadt.

On January 1, 1975, Dornstetten was merged with Aach and Hallwangen to make up the municipality of Dornstetten, as part of Baden-Württemberg's major communal reforms in the early 1970s.

=== Religions ===
Since the time of the Reformation, Dornstetten has been heavily Protestant. A Roman Catholic church is in the town, but Catholics in Dornstetten technically belong to the parochial community of Freudenstadt. A New Apostolic church, as well as a Methodist community, can also be found in Dornstetten.

=== Coat of arms ===
The arms of Dornstetten consist of a black five-pointed antler (representing Württemberg) above a black thornbush (canting arms based on the town's name, as Dorn means "thorn" in German)

=== Sister cities ===
Dornstetten enjoys a partnership with Scey-sur-Saône-et-Saint-Albin in the department of Haute Saône in France, where students from Dornstetten Gymnasium participate yearly in a student exchange program.

== Economy and infrastructure ==
=== Transportation ===
The city maintains a bus line and belongs to the Transport Association of the District of Freudenstadt, the VGF (Verkehrs-Gemeinschaft Landkreis Freudenstadt). Dornstetten also has a stop along the Eutingen-Freudenstadt railroad line (the Gäubahn). Every two hours, one can catch a direct train to Karlsruhe or Stuttgart.

=== Education ===
Dornstetten has a Gymnasium, a Realschule, and a Hauptschule in one building, three elementary schools (one each in Dornstetten, Aach, and Hallwangen), and seven Kindergartens. The Neckar-Alb Region School for the Physically Disabled operates a branch in Dornstetten, and the area has a special school for the mentally disabled, the Wilhelm-Hofman Schule.

== Culture and attractions ==
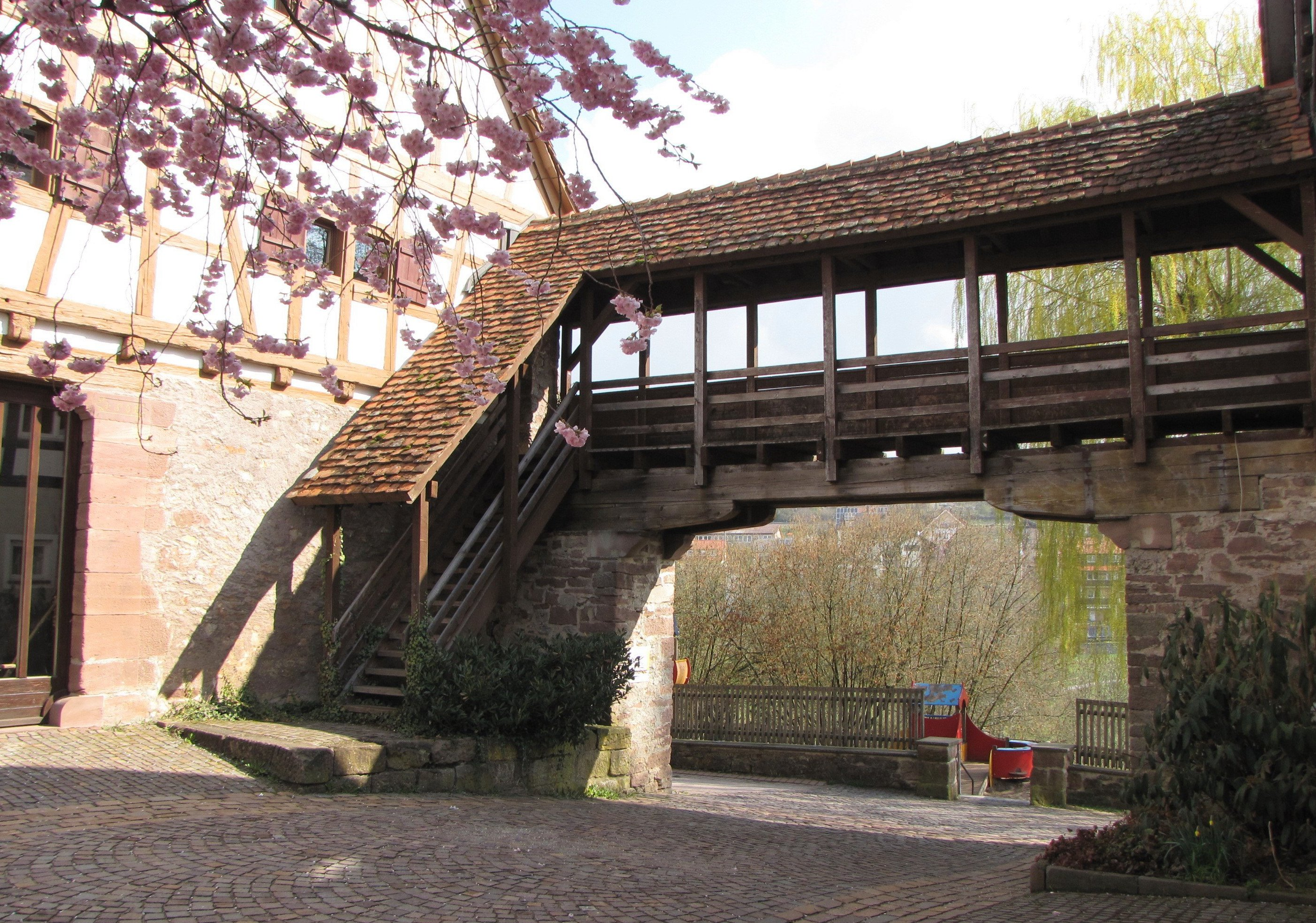
Town wall

=== Museums ===
Like most towns in the area, Dornstetten has a Heimatmuseum which documents the history of the local area. The Doll and Toy Museum is housed in the Hegel Department Store building (Kaufhaus Hegel).

Himmlisch Heer is a historic copper, silver and barite mine open to the public in Hallwangen.

=== Buildings ===
The historic Altstadt with its half-timbered Fachwerkhäuser, is well known throughout the area, and a popular destination for day-trippers. Dornstetten lies along the southern part of the German Half-Timbered House Road (Deutsche Fachwerkstraße), which runs from Mosbach to Haslach im Kinzigtal and includes several historic attractions.

St. Martin's Church is a late Gothic building from the time of Count Eberhard. The first documentary mention of the church and the parish of Dornstetten dates back to November 12, 1267. In 1410, it was given its basic shape, which it still has today. The sacristy, the Gothic choir and possibly even the massive west tower date from this time, if it was not added in 1490. A foundation stone at the north portal of the tower indicates this date. The church has been a Protestant establishment since 1534. However, on May 8, 1676, a catastrophic fire swept through the town and engulfed the church, causing significant damage. The flames destroyed the roof trusses, and with a deafening crash, the bells tumbled into the bell yard, shattering upon impact. In 1677, Johann David Frisch donated a new baptismal font to the church. The following year, in 1678, French bell founders crafted the largest bell in the peal, known as the “Dominica,” or Sunday bell.

=== Barefoot park ===
The Barefoot Park Dornstetten in Hallwangen offers a 2.4 km (1.5-mi) path and several stations along the way to learn about nature, play, or experience walking barefoot for its medicinal value.

== Famous residents ==
- Jacob Beurlin (ca. 1520; † October 28, 1561 in Paris), Protestant theologian and Reformer
- Wolfram Graf (*1965), composer, pianist, and organist
