= Loßburg =

- Municipality
- Coat of arms

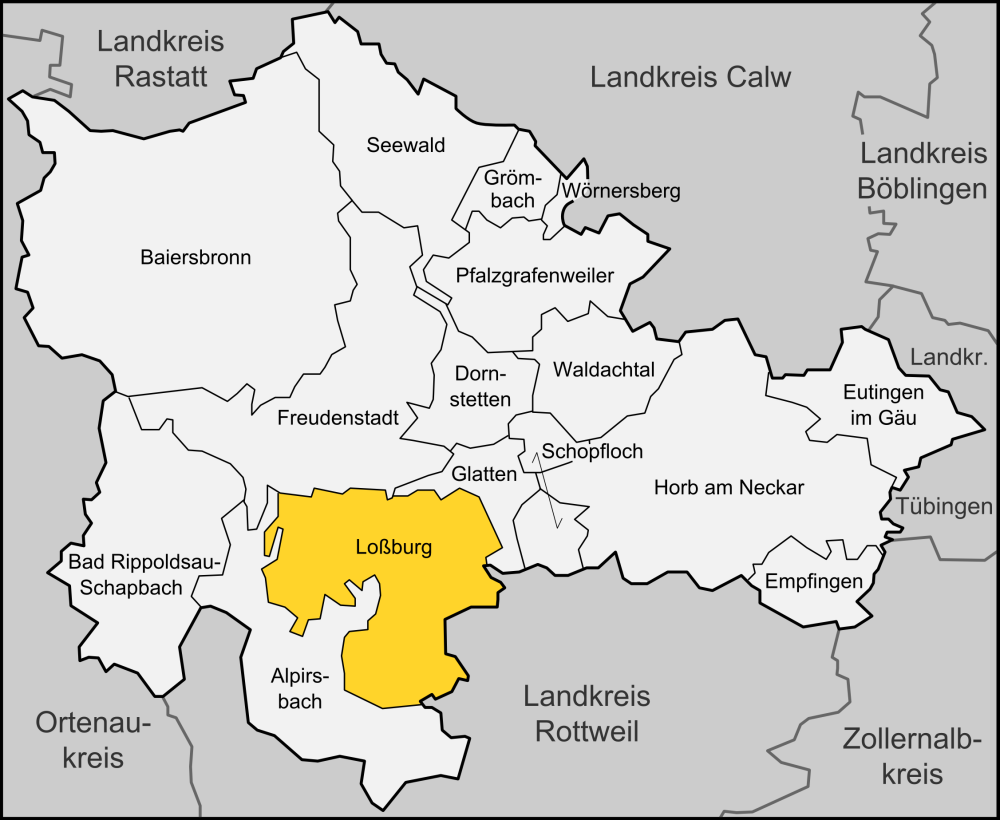
- Location of Loßburg within Freudenstadt district
- Interactive map of Loßburg
- Location within Germany Location within Baden-Württemberg
- Coordinates: 48°24′40″N 8°27′05″E
- Country: Germany
- State: Baden-Württemberg
- Admin. region: Karlsruhe
- District: Freudenstadt
- Subdivisions: 6

Government
  - Mayor (2020–28): Christoph Enderle

Area
  - Total: 79.26 km^{2} (30.60 sq mi)
- Elevation: 666 m (2,185 ft)

Population (2025-12-31)
  - Total: 7,916
  - Density: 99.87/km^{2} (258.7/sq mi)
- Time zone: UTC+01:00 (CET)
  - Summer (DST): UTC+02:00 (CEST)
- Postal codes: 72290
- Dialling codes: 07446, 07455, 07444
- Vehicle registration: FDS, HCH, HOR, WOL
- Website: www.lossburg.de

Loßburg is a municipality in the district of Freudenstadt in Baden-Württemberg in southern Germany.

== Demographics ==
Population development:

Year	Inhabitants
1990	7,099
2001	7,948
2011	7,464
2021	7,604

== Geography ==
=== Kinzig ===
The source of the Kinzig is located on the Gemarkung of Loßburg.

=== Municipal Structure ===
The town of Loßburg consists of the eight districts Loßburg, Betzweiler, Lombach, Schömberg, Sterneck, Wälde, Wittendorf and 24-Höfe a district consisting of several hamlets and homesteads.

== Politics ==
=== Municipal council ===
The municipal council consists of the elected council members and the mayor as chair of the committee.

Result of the last election on 26 May 2019.

Partei/Liste	percent of votes	Seats	2014
Freie Wähler	66,2 %	12	63,1 %, 12 Sitze
CDU	14,6 %	3	18,7 %, 3 Sitze
Grüne Liste	14,3 %	2	– –
SPD	4,9 %	1	18,2 %, 3 Sitze
voter turnout	65,6 %		49,2 %

=== Mayor ===
Christoph Enderle was elected 2013 as mayor of Loßburg. His predecessor was Thilo Schreiber.

=== Crest ===
Blazon: "On blue background a green hill and a silver tower. Above the tower is the white letter L."

=== Town twinning ===
Loßburg is twinned with Anse (France), Harta (Hungary), and Hammerbrücke (Saxony).
