= Badische Eschach =

River in Germany

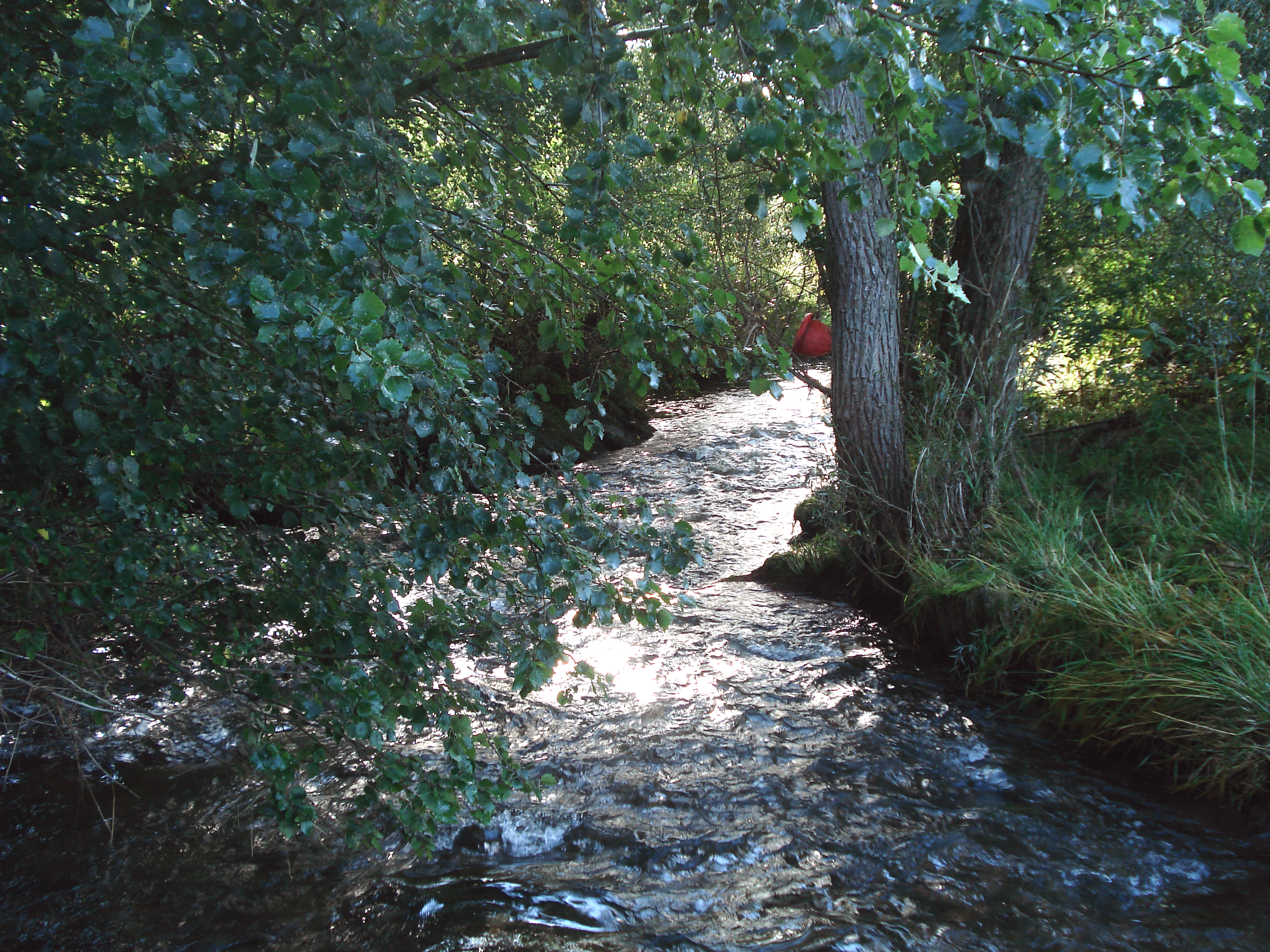

Location
- Country: Germany
- State: Baden-Württemberg

Physical characteristics
- Mouth
  - location: Fischbach
  - coordinates: 48.1393°N 8.5328°E
- Length: 13.9 km (8.6 mi)

Basin features
- Progression: Fischbach→ Eschach→ Neckar→ Rhine→ North Sea

The Badische Eschach is a river in Baden-Württemberg, Germany. It flows into the Fischbach in Niedereschach.

== See also ==
- List of rivers of Baden-Württemberg
