= List of harmonicists =

This is a list of musicians that are notable for their harmonica playing skills.

== Harmonica bands/groups ==
- Borrah Minevitch and his Harmonica Rascals
- Morton Fraser's Harmonica Gang
- The Harmonica Gentlemen
- Jerry Murad's Harmonicats
- Johnny Puleo's Harmonica Gang
- King's College Harmonica Band
- Sväng
- The Three Monarchs

== Blues ==
- Adam Gussow (Satan and Adam)
- Aki Kumar
- Alan Glen
- Annie Raines
- Alan Wilson (Canned Heat)
- Big Mama Thornton
- Big Walter Horton
- Bill Dicey
- Billy Bizor
- Billy Boy Arnold
- Billy Branch
- Billy Gibson
- Blind Mississippi Morris
- Bob Corritore
- Bonny B.
- Captain Beefheart
- Carey Bell
- Carlos del Junco
- Charlie Musselwhite
- Charlie Sayles
- Chris Wilson
- Corky Siegel
- Curtis Salgado
- Cyril Davies
- Charly Chiarelli
- Dan Aykroyd (as Elwood Blues)
- Delbert McClinton
- Dennis Gruenling
- Don Partridge
- Dutch Mason
- Eddie "Guitar" Burns
- Fabio Treves
- Garrett Dutton
- Gary Primich
- George "Harmonica" Smith
- George "Mojo" Buford
- George Higgs
- Golden "Big" Wheeler
- Good Rockin' Charles
- Greg "Fingers" Taylor
- Hammie Nixon
- Harmonica Fats
- Harmonica Frank
- Harmonica Shah
- Howlin' Wolf
- Huey Lewis (Huey Lewis and the News)
- Igor Flach
- J. D. Wilkes
- J.D. Short
- James Cotton
- James Harman
- James Montgomery
- Jason Ricci
- Jazz Gillum
- Jean-Jacques Milteau
- Jerry McCain
- Jerry Portnoy
- Jim Belushi (also as Brother Zee Blues)
- Jim Conway (Australian)
- Jimmy Reed
- Joe Dolce
- Joe Filisko
- John "Juke" Logan
- John Mayall (Bluesbreakers)
- John Mayer
- John Németh
- John Popper (Blues Traveler)
- Johnny Dyer
- Johnny Sansone
- Junior Wells
- Kim Wilson (formerly of The Fabulous Thunderbirds)
- Lazy Lester
- Les Stroud
- Lester Butler
- Little Mack Simmons
- Little Sammy Davis
- Little Sonny
- Little Walter
- Lynwood Slim
- Mark Feltham
- Mark Hummel (The Blues Survivors)
- Mark Wenner (The Nighthawks)
- Marla Glen
- Matt Taylor
- Moses "Whispering" Smith
- Noah Lewis
- Norton Buffalo
- Paul Butterfield
- Paul deLay
- Paul Jones
- Paul Lamb
- Paul Oscher (Muddy Waters Band)
- Pete Hampton
- Peter Madcat Ruth
- Phil Wiggins
- Philip Achille
- Pierre Lacocque
- Powell St. John
- R.J. Mischo
- Rob Hoeke
- Rob Paparozzi
- Rob Stone
- Robert Lucas
- Rod Piazza
- Sam Myers
- Shakey Jake Harris
- Slim Harpo
- Snooky Pryor
- Sonny Boy Williamson I (a.k.a. John Lee Williamson)
- Sonny Boy Williamson II (a.k.a. Aleck Ford "Rice" Miller)
- Sonny Terry
- Steven Tyler (Aerosmith)
- Sugar Blue
- Sugar Ray Norcia
- Suzanne Link
- Tad Robinson
- Taj Mahal
- Taylor Hicks
- Thom Doucette
- Tony "Little Sun" Glover
- Walkin' Cane Mark
- Bill "Watermelon Slim" Homans
- Will Shade
- William Clarke

== Bluegrass ==
- Willie P. Bennett
- Mike Stevens

== Folk ==
- Bobby Darin
- Hugo Díaz
- Jay Diggins
- Donovan
- Bob Dylan
- Ramblin' Jack Elliott
- Steve Forbert
- Jesse Fuller
- León Gieco
- Laura Jane Grace
- Dallas Green
- Arlo Guthrie
- Woody Guthrie
- Sam Hinton
- Jenny Lewis
- Mel Lyman
- Rory McLeod
- Tom Morello (The Nightwatchman)
- Chuck Ragan
- Ketch Secor (Old Crow Medicine Show)
- Sonny Terry
- Vikki Thorn (The Waifs)
- Doc Watson
- Neil Young

== Rock ==
- Adam Lazzara (Taking Back Sunday)
- Al Stewart
- Alan Wilson (Canned Heat)
- Alanis Morissette
- Ambrose Kenny-Smith (King Gizzard & the Lizard Wizard)
- Andrew Farriss (INXS)
- Andrew McMahon
- Andy Williams
- Anton Newcombe (The Brian Jonestown Massacre)
- Arthur Lee (Love)
- Benny Gallagher (Gallagher and Lyle)
- Bertrand Cantat (Noir Désir)
- Billie Joe Armstrong (Green Day)
- Billy Joel
- Billy Lee Riley
- Bob Dylan
- Bono (U2)
- Bret Michaels (Poison)
- Brian Greenway (April Wine, Mashmakhan)
- Brian Jones (The Rolling Stones)
- Brian Molko (Placebo)
- Broderick Smith
- Bruce Springsteen
- Bryan Adams
- Burton Cummings
- Chris Lowell
- Chris Martin (Coldplay)
- Chris Robinson (The Black Crowes)
- Chris Squire (Yes)
- Chris Wolstenholme (Muse)
- Chrissie Hynde (The Pretenders)
- Christofer Drew (Never Shout Never)
- Claudio Sanchez (Coheed and Cambria)
- Cody Canada (Cross Canadian Ragweed, The Departed)
- Dave Gage
- Dave Gahan (Depeche Mode)
- Dave Mason (Traffic)
- David Bowie
- David Gilmour (Pink Floyd)
- David Johansen (New York Dolls)
- David Lee Roth
- Eddie Vedder (Pearl Jam)
- Enrique Bunbury (Héroes del Silencio)
- G. Love
- Gary Brooker (Procol Harum)
- Gem Archer (Oasis)
- Gene Clark (The Byrds)
- Gene Cornish (The Rascals, Fotomaker)
- Greg Lake (Emerson, Lake and Palmer) Paper Blood on the Black Moon album.
- Hope Sandoval (Mazzy Star)
- Huey Lewis (Huey Lewis and the News)
- Humberto Gessinger (Engenheiros do Hawaii)
- Ian Anderson (Jethro Tull)
- Ian Gillan (Deep Purple)
- Jack Bruce
- James Taylor
- Jim Fitting (Treat Her Right)
- Joe Satriani
- John Fogerty (Creedence Clearwater Revival)
- John Kay (Steppenwolf)
- John Lennon (Beatles)
- John Mellencamp
- John Popper (Blues Traveler)
- John Sebastian (The Lovin' Spoonful)
- Johnny Marr
- Jon Bon Jovi
- Jon Foreman (Switchfoot)
- Jonny Greenwood (Radiohead)
- Keith Relf
- Kelly Hoppe (Big Sugar)
- Lee Brilleaux (Dr. Feelgood)
- Lee Oskar (War)
- Lemmy (Motörhead)
- Levon Helm (The Band)
- Magic Dick (The J. Geils Band)
- Matt Mays
- Melissa Etheridge
- Mick Jagger
- Nancy Wilson (Heart)
- Neil Young
- Nenad Milosavljević (Galija)
- Ozzy Osbourne (Black Sabbath)
- Pete Yorn
- Peter Garrett (Midnight Oil)
- Pete Stahl (Goatsnake)
- Philip Achille
- PJ Harvey
- Ray Collins (The Mothers of Invention)
- Ray Davies (The Kinks)
- Ray Dorset (Mungo Jerry)
- Ray Jackson (Lindisfarne)
- Ray Thomas (The Moody Blues)
- Richard Manuel (The Band)
- Rick Danko (The Band)
- Rick Davies (Supertramp)
- Rivers Cuomo (Weezer)
- Rob Paparozzi
- Robbie Robertson (The Band)
- Robert Plant (Led Zeppelin)
- Robert Smith (The Cure)
- Rod Stewart
- Roger Daltrey (The Who)
- Ron McKernan (Grateful Dead)
- Ronnie Wood (Faces, The Rolling Stones)
- Rory Gallagher
- Ryan Adams
- Scott Thurston (Tom Petty and the Heartbreakers)
- Shakira
- Shannon Hoon (Blind Melon)
- Sheryl Crow
- Southside Johnny
- Stan Ridgway ( Wall of Voodoo)
- Steve Marriott (Small Faces, Humble Pie)
- Steven Tyler (Aerosmith)
- Stevie Wonder
- Sully Erna (Godsmack)
- Susanna Hoffs (The Bangles)
- Teddy Andreadis
- Tim Armstrong (Rancid)
- Tom Fogerty (Creedence Clearwater Revival)
- Tom Petty
- Van Morrison
- Warren Zevon

== Country music ==
- Philip Achille
- Ryan Adams
- DeFord Bailey
- Humphrey Bate
- Ryan Bingham
- Clint Black
- Steve Earle
- Evan Felker (Turnpike Troubadours)
- Buddy Greene
- Chris Janson
- Ryan Koenig
- Kris Kristofferson
- Martina McBride
- Parker McCollum
- Charlie McCoy
- Terry McMillan
- Heidi Newfield
- Mickey Raphael
- Bobbejaan Schoepen
- Neil Young

== Irish music ==
- Bobby Clancy (The Clancy Brothers)
- Patrick Clancy (The Clancy Brothers)
- James Conway (United States)
- Andy Irvine
- Brendan Power

== Jazz ==
- Rob Paparozzi
- Philip Achille
- Larry Adler
- Sébastien Charlier
- Max Geldray
- Filip Jers
- Carlos del Junco
- Charles Leighton
- Howard Levy
- Grégoire Maret
- Chris Michalek
- Stefano Olivato
- Tollak Ollestad
- Lee Oskar
- Jason Rosenblatt
- Toots Thielemans
- Stevie Wonder
- Frédéric Yonnet

== Classical music ==
- Philip Achille
- Jerry Adler
- Larry Adler
- Robert Bonfiglio
- Willi Burger
- Angelo Dos Santos
- Sigmund Groven
- Stan Harper
- Tommy Reilly
- John Sebastian, Sr.

== Tango ==
- Hugo Diaz
- Joe Powers

== Hip hop ==
- Bad News Brown

== Afrobeat ==
- D'banj
