= HarmonicaUK =

Organization in the United Kingdom

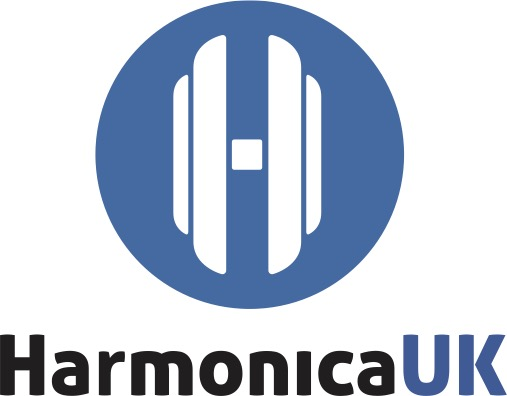
- Founded: 1935
- Type: Registered Charity (England & Wales)
- Location: United Kingdom
- President: Paul Jones
- Chair: Gene Myers
- Publication: Harmonica World
- Website: www.harmonica.uk
- Formerly called: National Harmonica League

HarmonicaUK (formerly the National Harmonica League) is a UK-based organisation for harmonica players and enthusiasts of all styles of harmonica including chromatic, diatonic, tremolo, chord, and bass. It has been active since 1935.

HarmonicaUK is a registered Charity (England & Wales), and its current President is Paul Jones. Previous Presidents include Larry Adler and Ronald Chesney. The current Chair is Gene Myers. Previous Chairs include Dave Colclough, Barry Elms, Pete Hewitt, Ben Hewlett, Roger Trobridge, Colin Mort and John Walton.

The Charity changed its name to HarmonicaUK at the AGM in Nov 2020.

HarmonicaUK is based in Great Britain, but has members and contributors from around the world, and membership is open to anyone. It welcomes players of all levels, including beginners, and it can help with questions about getting started or improving your playing ability.

It organises festivals, events and online events. The festival includes workshops, concerts and a harmonica contest which has been won by many players who went on to play professionally, including Philip Achille. The Saturday Evening Festival Concert features top artists from around the world – including Steve Baker, Filip Jers, Antonio Serrano, Cy Leo, Rachelle Plas, Will Wilde, Joe Filisko, Brendan Power, Willi Berger, Greg Zlap, Lee Oskar, Will Galison, and Donald Black.

The main annual festival was held in The Bristol Folk House until 2018, and the 2019 Festival was held in Gloucester. The 2020 and 2021 virtual festivals were held online because of social distancing requirements; the virtual festivals enabled us to bring top artists from around the world to perform for our members and the wider public on a voluntary donation basis where proceeds went to the artists. Since 2022, the festival returned as a live event in Rednal, Birmingham.

As experience with conferencing software like Zoom spread to most members, other online events take place, such as the weekly free "Lockdown" tuition sessions (now Saturday Sessions) and a weekly "Friday Coffee Morning" where members meet socially and chat.

HarmonicaUK publishes a members' magazine, Harmonica World, four times a year. The magazine is in A5 format, and contains articles covering tuition, harmonica history, artists, members' experiences, technical reviews and news of events, recordings and new products.
