= Rottweil–Villingen railway =

Railway in Germany

Overview
- Line number: 4650
- Locale: Baden-Württemberg, Germany

Service
- Route number: 742

Technical
- Line length: 26.787 km (16.645 mi)
- Track gauge: 1,435 mm (4 ft 8 1/2 in) standard gauge

The Rottweil–Villingen railway is a single-track, non-electrified, railway on the eastern edge of the Black Forest in the German state of Baden-Württemberg. It runs partly in the upper Neckar valley and connects Rottweil on the Plochingen–Immendingen railway with Villingen-Schwenningen on the Black Forest Railway. It is served by timetable line 742, on the Rottweil–Bräunlingen/–Trossingen Stadt route (Alemannenbahn).

== History ==
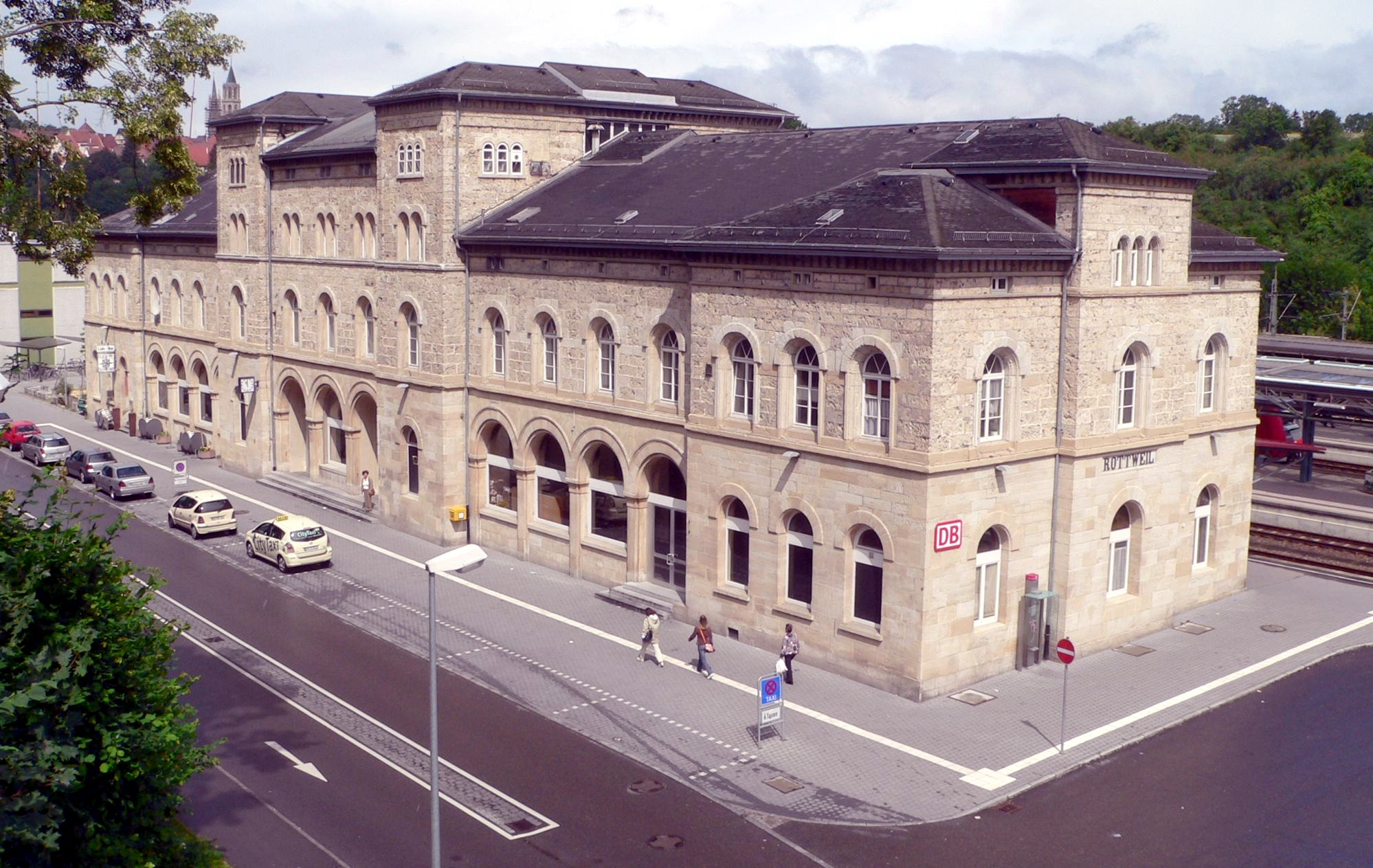
Rottweil station

In 1865, the former countries of Baden and Württemberg agreed to connect their rail networks in the south.

After the Upper Neckar Railway had reached Rottweil in 1868 and the Black Forest Railway reached Villingen in 1869, the 27 km-long Rottweil–Villingen railway was opened on 26 August 1869. Johannes Bürk, a watch manufacturer and a member of parliament from Schwenningen had a decisive influence on the line. Bürk successfully lobbied to ensure that the line ran via Schwenningen. The original plan was a route further north, via Niedereschach.

As only a small part of the line ran through Baden in the Villingen area, it was built and operated solely by the Royal Württemberg State Railways (Königlich Württembergischen Staats-Eisenbahnen) under the terms of a treaty of 18 February 1865.

An important stop is Trossingen station. The electric Trossingen Railway (Trossinger Eisenbahn), which was owned by the town of Trossingen, was opened on 14 December 1898. It runs for 4.5 km from Trossingen station to Trossingen Stadt (town), which is on a hill in the Baar.

== Services ==
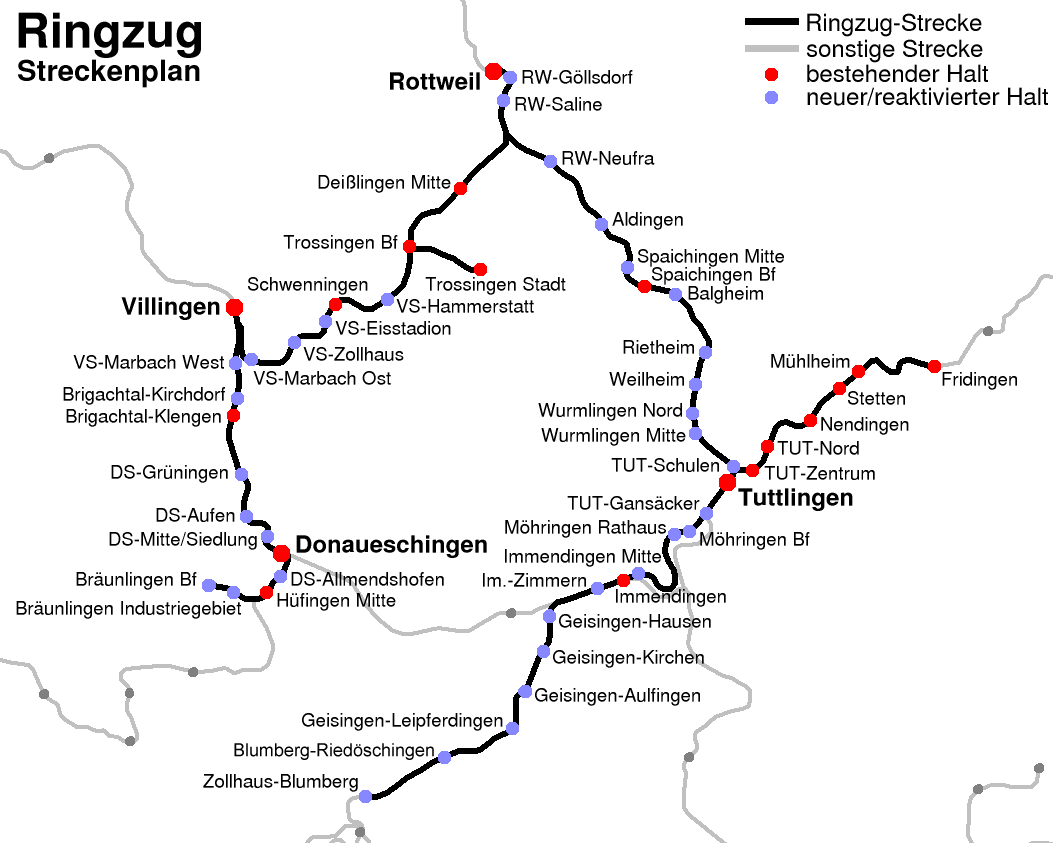
Rottweil-Villingen railway as part of the current Ringzug network

Services of the Ringzug of the Hohenzollerische Landesbahn run on the line between Villingen and Trossingen at hourly intervals on weekdays. The Trossingen–Rottweil section is served by the 3-Ringzug every two hours. In addition, Regional-Express services are operated by Deutsche Bahn every two hours on the Neustadt (Schwarzw)–Rottweil route. 3-Ringzug services run on the branch line to Trossingen Stadt and provide some direct connections between (Bräunlingen–) Villingen and Trossingen Stadt.
