= Trossingen station =

Railway station in Deißlingen, Germany

Trossingen Bahnhof
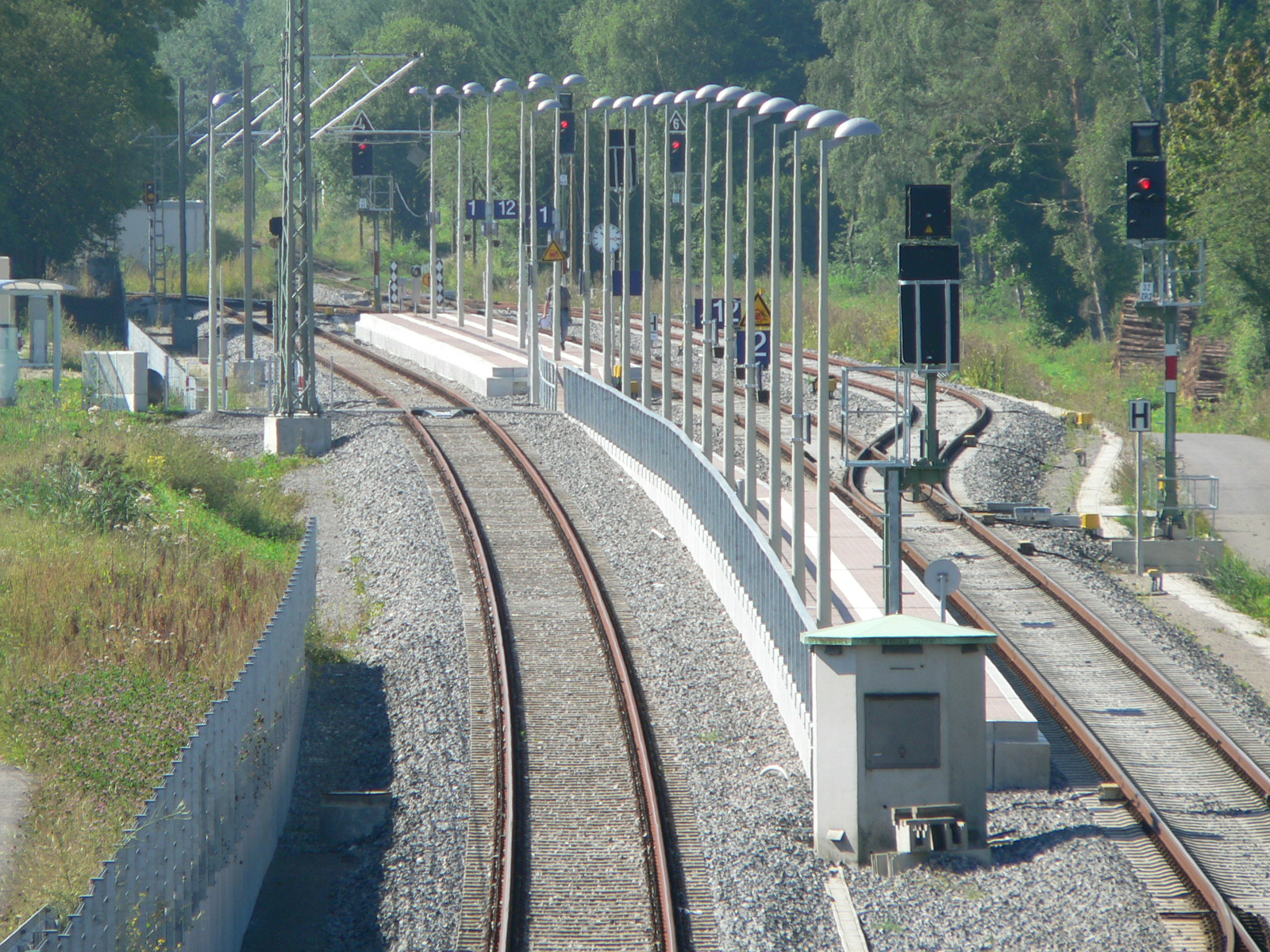
- Trossingen station

General information
- Location: Mittelhart 1, Deißlingen, Baden-Württemberg; Germany
- Coordinates: 48°05′16″N 8°35′06″E
- Lines: Rottweil–Villingen; Trossingen Bahnhof–Trossingen Stadt
- Platforms: 2

Construction
- Accessible: Yes

Other information
- Station code: 6276
- DS100 code: TTR
- IBNR: 8005911
- Category: 6
- Fare zone: Move: 2, 4, and 7
- Website: www.bahnhof.de

History
- Opened: 26 August 1869
Location

Trossingen station (formerly Trossingen Staatsbahnhof—"state station") is a station that serves Trossingen, but is located in the municipality of Deißlingen in the German state of Baden-Württemberg. Its name in German, Trossingen Bahnhof, rather than Bahnhof Trossingen, indicates that it serves Trossingen, but it is not in it. The Trossingen Railway (Trossinger Eisenbahn, Trossingen station–Trossingen Stadt railway) branches off the Rottweil–Villingen railway off here and connects the city to the railway network. The station is at 644 metres above sea level between Dauchingen, Deißlingen, Trossingen and Villingen-Schwenningen near the intersection of autobahn 81 and federal highway 27.

Trossingen station is served by Regional-Express services operated by Deutsche Bahn. It is also served by Ringzug services operated by Hohenzollerische Landesbahn (HzL). Some of these trains are divided at Trossingen station, with one section running on the Rottweil–Villingen line and the other section running to Trossingen Stadt. HzL also offers rides on historic railcars, which once operated over the line to Trossingen Stadt.

The former two-storey entrance building contained a main hall and an apartment. It was built from tuff and has remained largely unchanged to this day. It is built in the former building style that was designated as construction type group 1 (Bautyp Gruppe 1). The building is a listed building, but is no longer used as an entrance building. Today's platforms are located about one hundred metres to the east.

== Rail services ==
Train class	Route	Frequency
RB 42	Bräunlingen – Donaueschingen – Villingen (Schwarzwald) – Trossingen Bahnhof – Rottweil (some continuing from Donaueschingen as RB 43 towards Immendingen/Geisingen-Leipferdingen/Blumberg-Zollhaus)	60 min
RE 42	Villingen (Schwarzwald) – Trossingen Bahnhof – Rottweil	3 train pairs (peak)
RB 42a	Trossingen Bahnhof – Trossingen Stadt	30 min (peak); 60 min
