= Titisee station =

Railway station in Titisee-Neustadt, Germany

Titisee
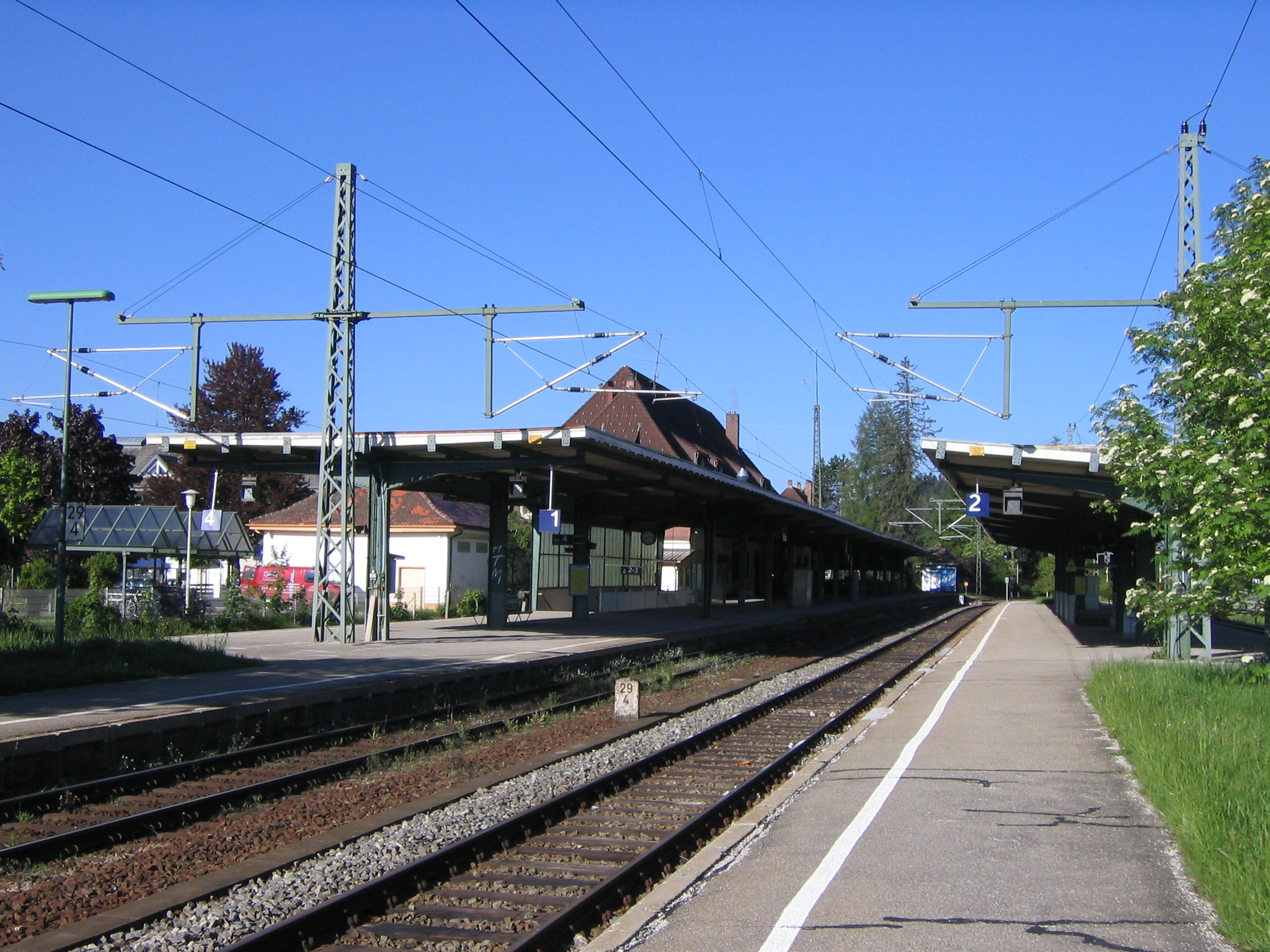
- 2006

General information
- Location: Parkstraße 11; 79822 Titisee-Neustadt; Baden-Württemberg; Germany
- Coordinates: 47.903°N 8.155°E
- Elevation: 858 m (2,815 ft)
- Owner: Deutsche Bahn
- Operator: DB Netz; DB Station&Service
- Lines: Höllentalbahn (KBS 727); Dreiseenbahn (KBS 728)
- Platforms: 1 island platform 1 side platform
- Tracks: 3
- Train operators: DB Regio Baden-Württemberg
- Connections: RB; 7255 7257 7300

Construction
- Parking: yes
- Cycle facilities: yes
- Accessible: yes

Other information
- Station code: 6220
- DS100 code: RTIT
- IBNR: 8005876
- Category: 5
- Fare zone: RVF: C; WTV: RVF (RVF transitional tariff, select season tickets only)
- Website: www.bahnhof.de

History
- Opened: 23 May 1887; 139 years ago
- Electrified: 18 June 1936; 90 years ago

Services
Preceding station	Breisgau S-Bahn	Following station
Hinterzarten towards Breisach	S1	Feldberg-Bärental towards Seebrugg
Hinterzarten towards Breisach	S1	Neustadt (Schwarzw) Terminus
Hinterzarten towards Freiburg Hbf	S10	Neustadt (Schwarzw) towards Villingen (Schwarzwald)
Hinterzarten towards Endingen am Kaiserstuhl	S11	Neustadt (Schwarzw) Terminus
Location

Titisee station (German: Bahnhof Titisee) is a railway station in the municipality of Titisee-Neustadt, located in the Breisgau-Hochschwarzwald district in Baden-Württemberg, Germany.

== Notable places nearby ==
- Titisee
