= John Sebastian (classical harmonica player) =

- John Sebastian, c. 1953

Background information
- Born: John Sebastian Pugliese; April 25, 1914; Philadelphia, Pennsylvania, United States
- Died: August 18, 1980 (aged 66) Périgord, France
- Genres: Classical
- Occupations: Musician, composer
- Instrument: Harmonica
- Years active: 1930–1980
- Labels: Schirmer, RCA Victor, Cadence, Columbia, Decca, Deutsche Grammophon, Heliodor

John Sebastian (born John Sebastian Pugliese; April 25, 1914 − August 18, 1980) was an American musician and composer known as a master of the classical chromatic harmonica. He was the first harmonicist to adopt an all-classical repertoire and, along with Larry Adler and Tommy Reilly, established the harmonica as a serious instrument for classical music. In addition to performing, Sebastian increased the range of classical music available for the harmonica by transcribing numerous existing classical works for the harmonica, composing works of his own, and commissioning or otherwise encouraging other composers to write for the instrument.

He is the father of singer-songwriter John B. Sebastian, a founder of the popular 1960s folk rock band The Lovin' Spoonful.

== Early life ==
Sebastian was born John Sebastian Pugliese on April 25, 1914, into a wealthy Italian banking family in Philadelphia, Pennsylvania, where his father was a bank president. Later in life, Sebastian truncated his name to "John Sebastian." He is sometimes called "John Sebastian Sr." to distinguish him from his rock musician son John Benson Sebastian; however, the Sr./ Jr. designation is not strictly correct as his son has a different middle name.

As a boy, Sebastian became interested in the harmonica, which in the 1920s was being promoted to Philadelphia youth through bands and contests organized by philanthropist Albert N. Hoxie and sponsored by the Philadelphia Rotary Club and Musical League. The harmonica was seen as a cheap instrument, easy to learn and play, that could provide young people with both a social outlet and the basic musical knowledge to stimulate their interest in learning more "important" instruments such as piano and violin. In 1924, approximately 10,000 boys participated in the citywide harmonica contest, and by 1926, an estimated 70,000 Philadelphia boys were members of harmonica groups.

Sebastian's harmonica skills were quickly recognized. He joined Hoxie's Philadelphia Harmonica Band, an elite ensemble of 50 to 60 boys that traveled the country and played for presidents, visiting dignitaries, and special events such as the Philadelphia celebration of Charles Lindbergh's transatlantic flight. He also worked for several seasons as an instructor at Hoxie's summer harmonica camp, teaching other boys to play. By age 12, he was featured as a soloist with John Philip Sousa's band.

In 1930, at age 16, Sebastian won the citywide contest and was named Philadelphia's harmonica champion. His prize included a one-week engagement at the Mastbaum Theatre, then the largest and most lavish movie theater in Philadelphia, for which he was paid $125. Rejecting a management request that he play the popular "St. Louis Blues," he chose instead to play an adaptation of pianist Alexander Borovsky's composition "Adoration", which was well received by the audience.

Despite this early success, Sebastian's father did not want his son to have a musical career and instead encouraged his interests in history and Renaissance art. Sebastian graduated from Haverford College in 1936 and studied abroad in Rome and Florence in preparation for a foreign service career, although he was still interested in the harmonica. On the ship back to the United States, he met and was encouraged by Broadway composers Rodgers and Hart, and some time thereafter decided to make the harmonica his career.

== Career ==
=== Performing career ===
Sebastian began his harmonica soloist career in the late 1930s playing nightclubs and cabarets, where his repertoire initially included swing music. Because very little classical music had been written for the harmonica, Sebastian painstakingly transcribed and adapted suitable works that had been composed for other wind instruments or for violin. Between his club dates, he rehearsed for three hours a day and worked on his transcriptions. As each new adaptation was complete, he added it to his repertoire, until within a few years, his sets consisted solely of classical music. He refused to compromise by playing "swing" versions of the classics, and even turned down a Hollywood contract because he would not have control over the musical selections he would play. His choice of material enhanced his reputation as a nightclub performer, and by the early 1940s he regularly appeared at elite clubs such as Café Society and the rooms at the Pierre, Waldorf and St. Regis hotels in New York City, and the Palmer House in Chicago.

Despite Sebastian's nightclub success, he aspired to perform in a concert setting (which his contemporary Larry Adler had already accomplished), and to have the harmonica accepted as a serious instrument by classical music critics and the concert-going public. In order to achieve his goals, Sebastian had to overcome the prevalent view of a harmonica as a "lowly" instrument with little musical value. With the assistance of his manager, André Mertens of the prestigious Columbia Artists Management, in 1941 he debuted as a soloist with the Philadelphia Orchestra, conducted by Eugene Ormandy. Following this breakthrough, Sebastian transitioned from nightclubs to the concert stage. From the 1940s through the 1960s, he toured extensively throughout the U.S. and Canada, giving concerts and recitals. He performed in a wide range of settings, including appearances with major orchestras, community concerts staged at local churches and high schools, and other stage productions such as a revue produced by Vincent Youmans. He also frequently appeared on radio, including performances with the NBC Symphony Orchestra and a fourteen-week series of solo programs over the Blue Network, and later on television.

In December 1954, he gave a full-length classical music recital at The Town Hall in New York City, then considered essential for an American soloist. The program was billed as his "debut" in a positive New York Times review by critic Ross Parmenter, even though by then he had already performed as a soloist with a number of major orchestras, and in 1946 had given a previous recital at the Town Hall with Virgil Thomson and Leonard Bernstein. Parmenter noted that Sebastian, rather than trying to hide the fact that the harmonica was a "small-toned" instrument, made its sound "smaller than need be by the way he envelops it in his hands" and that he worked for "subtlety and poetry within a small dynamic range."

In 1954, Sebastian was one of five American musicians invited to visit West Germany as guests of the Federal Republic of Germany; this marked the first time a foreign government had acted as host to American artists. He toured internationally throughout the 1950s and 1960s, including appearances in Europe as well as the Far East and Africa. He appeared not only in major cities such as Seoul and Tokyo, but also in less traveled areas such as Okayama, Japan, where he was enthusiastically welcomed by children studying harmonica as part of a program to re-establish music education in local schools.

Sebastian, who was self-taught, studied and incorporated techniques used by wind instrument players in many ethnic traditions, in particular learning from Mexican pipe players how to hold air in his cheeks, and practicing yoga to improve his breathing technique.

=== Repertoire ===
Many of Sebastian's selections came from the seventeenth and eighteenth century baroque music era, although he adapted some works by more modern composers such as Rimsky-Korsakov, Bartók and Gershwin. He also drew from the works of impressionists such as Debussy and Ravel, thinking them "ideal" for transposition to the harmonica. He avoided the works of romantic music composers such as Schumann, Brahms and Chopin because he felt that "[the harmonica] does not have the lush, sentimental tone that is so necessary in 'romantic music'. The harmonica can be plaintive, pastoral, ascetic, gay, whimsical— but never 'romantic' in the true sense of the word. I have therefore kept to the wealth of music I believe better suited to the instrument." Despite this statement, he did include a Brahms composition, "Hungarian Dance No. 6," on two of his records, A Harmonica Recital (Schirmer, 1940) and Profile of John Sebastian (Decca, 1960).

In at least one instance, Sebastian's transcriptions caused controversy when the French publishers Durand & Co., who owned the copyright for the Debussy composition, "The Girl With the Flaxen Hair," that was originally transcribed for violin, refused to permit Sebastian to release a harmonica adaptation on his 1947 RCA Victor album Harmonica Classics. Durand claimed that it "would never authorize a performance for the harmonica," even though it had previously authorized harmonicist Larry Adler to record Debussy's "Clair de Lune".

Throughout the 1940s and 1950s, Sebastian continued to expand his available repertoire. He lobbied and sometimes commissioned contemporary composers to write harmonica pieces. Walter F. Anderson, Anthony Burgess, Luciano Chailly, Henry Cowell, Norman Dello Joio, Alan Hovhaness, George Kleinsinger, Frank Lewin, Donald Martino, Edward Robinson, Alexander Tcherepnin, and Heitor Villa-Lobos all composed works for him. Works created for Sebastian include Kleinsinger's "Street Corner Concerto" (1942), Tcherepnin's "Concerto for Harmonica and Orchestra, Op. 86" (1953), and Hovhaness' "Concerto No. 6, op. 114" (1953–1954). When Villa-Lobos composed his "Concerto for Harmonica and Orchestra" for Sebastian in 1955, Sebastian suggested changes that were approved by Villa-Lobos and incorporated into Sebastian's performance of the work. Sebastian himself also wrote several pieces for harmonica, including "Serenade for Exhale Notes", "Inca Dance", "Hornpipe Gigue", "Arabian Love Song", "Moroccan Serenade", and "Afro-Cuban Dance". Occasionally he also performed works that had been written for other harmonicists, such as Larry Adler.

=== Recordings ===
Starting in the 1940s, Sebastian released a series of records on different labels including Schirmer, RCA Victor, Cadence, Columbia, Decca, Deutsche Grammophon and Heliodor. These ranged from orchestra-backed recordings of the concertos written for him by Kleinsinger, Tcherepnin and Villa-Lobos, to light classical selections and even popular songs such as "Foolish Waltz" (promoted by Cadence as Sebastian's "First Popular Smash Record"), "Stranger in Paradise" and "Autumn Leaves". Sebastian collaborated with his then-wife Jane on a children's record called The Happy Harmonica (RCA Victor, 1948), which told the story of a little boy who saves pennies to buy his own harmonica. He wrote and performed the music, while she wrote the lyrics. In the early 1940s, he also released an instructional record on Schirmer entitled Play the Harmonica that provided a short basic two-part lesson on diatonic harmonica for the beginner.

As of 2015, Sebastian's records were all out of print, but according to Sebastian's son John B. Sebastian, the Music Masters label was contemplating some CD reissues.

Some additional unreleased Sebastian recordings also exist in library archives or as noncommercial acetates produced by Deryck Waring Records.

=== Other activities ===
Sebastian served as a consultant to the Hohner company, a major producer of harmonicas. His work was primarily directed towards improving the lower register of his harmonica of choice, the Hohner Chromonica 64.

Sebastian occasionally produced instructional materials aimed at teaching beginning harmonica. His instructional record Play the Harmonica focused on diatonic harmonica, and he also wrote a beginner's method book entitled An Introduction to the Chromatic Harmonica (aka Chromatic Harmonica Instruction Course) that was published by M. Hohner, Inc. in 1972. The book assumes no prior knowledge of music and teaches the notes, scales and techniques involved in playing the chromatic harmonica, using popular folk tunes as demonstration pieces.

Despite his own career focus on classical music, he enjoyed a wide range of folk music and ethnic music from around the world. His son John B. recalled him returning from tours of the United States with obscure folk and blues songs he had discovered in his travels.

=== Later career and death ===
In 1966, following a lengthy concert tour of Africa, Sebastian suffered a heart attack in Rome and after recuperating, remained there, staying until 1976 when he moved to France. Following his illness, he performed less frequently, mainly in Europe, and never performed some of the pieces that had been written for him just prior to his heart attack. (One such work, the "Harmonica Concerto" composed for Sebastian by Henry Cowell in 1962, was finally premiered in 1986 by Robert Bonfiglio with the Brooklyn Philharmonic Symphony Orchestra.). Despite Sebastian's setback, his occasional performances were still well-regarded; after a 1976 Kennedy Center solo performance, a Washington Star reviewer wrote, "He is THE master of the harmonica."

Sebastian died on August 18, 1980, at his home near Périgord, France.

== Personal life ==
Sebastian married Jane Bishir, a radio actress/scriptwriter and Carnegie Hall administrator, sometime before 1944. They had two sons, John B. and Mark. The family lived in Greenwich Village, where according to their son John B. they had a "slightly less than conventional" lifestyle and entertained a variety of artists and musicians, including Garth Williams, Burl Ives, Josh White and Woody Guthrie. The family regularly spent summers near Florence. Sebastian and Jane divorced in 1957.

He divorced his second wife, Geta Strock, in 1968. His third wife, Nadia, survived him. He had a stepdaughter by his second marriage.

== Influence and legacy ==
Although Sebastian's career was cut short by his illness and death, he is often credited, along with Larry Adler, with establishing the harmonica as a serious instrument for classical music and facilitating the creation of a body of classical music composed specifically for the harmonica. Classical harmonicist Robert Bonfiglio has stated that his work builds on that of both Sebastian and Adler.

Sebastian was also a strong influence on his eldest son, John B. Sebastian, who achieved fame in the 1960s as a founding member and principal songwriter for the band The Lovin' Spoonful. John B. became a respected harmonica player (in addition to playing guitar and autoharp), although he primarily plays in a Sonny Terry-influenced blues or folk style on a diatonic rather than chromatic harmonica. In interviews, John B. has described his early exposure to music and stage performance through his father's career, and how his father helped connect him with musicians who influenced his own career, such as Terry and Lightnin' Hopkins.

== Discography ==
Release year	Label/catalog #	Title	Format	Notes
1940	Schirmer; Set No. 11	A Harmonica Recital	Multiple 10-inch 78 rpm discs packaged in album	Contains "Pavane" (Ravel), "Caprice Viennois" (Kreisler), "Hora Staccato" (Dinicu-Heifetz), "Hungarian Dance No. 6" (Brahms), "España cañí" (credited as "Spanish Folk Dance"), "Arabian Love Song" (Sebastian), "Moroccan Serenade" (Sebastian). Sebastian plays unaccompanied.
? Probably late 1940s	Schirmer; Green Seal; 7509	Play the Harmonica	10-inch 78 rpm disc	Narrated two-part lesson on diatonic harmonica for beginners, with demonstrations.
1947	RCA Victor; P-166	Harmonica Classics	Four 10-inch 78 rpm discs packaged in album	Contains "Malaguena" (Lecuona), "Inca Dance" (Sebastian), "Aria" (Bach), "Ritual Fire Dance" (de Falla), "Stompe a la Turca" (credited as "with apologies to Mozart"), "The Girl with the Flaxen Hair" (Debussy), "Harmonica Player" (Guion), and "Moroccan Serenade" (Sebastian). With orchestra directed by Russ Case, and on some tracks Norris Shawker (drums) or Albert Malver (piano). In 1950, all tracks except "Stompe a la Turca" and "The Girl with the Flaxen Hair" were re-released under the same title in the format of three 7-inch 45 rpm discs, with catalog no. WP-166.
1948	RCA Victor; C-43	John Sebastian Plays The Street Corner Concerto	Three 12-inch 78 rpm discs packaged in album	Contains two other pieces, "Poeme" (Griffes) and "Roumanian Rhapsody" (Enescu), in addition to Kleinsinger's "Street Corner Concerto".
1948	RCA Victor; Y-363	The Happy Harmonica	Two 10-inch 78 rpm discs	Children's record and storybook, with narration and music by John Sebastian, written by him in collaboration with his wife Jane, who wrote lyrics. Credited as "Story by Jane and John Sebastian, as told by John Sebastian with his Harmonica".
1953	Cadence; 1420	"Foolish Waltz" b/w "Inca Dance"	7-inch 45 rpm disc	The first Cadence record not performed by Julius LaRosa. With orchestra conducted by Archie Bleyer (on "Foolish Waltz") and Terry Snyder, drums (on "Inca Dance"). Later released on 78 rpm and 45 rpm formats by London Records.
1954	Cadence; 1421	"Stranger in Paradise" b/w "Autumn Leaves"	7-inch 45 rpm disc	With orchestra conducted by Archie Bleyer.
1958	Columbia Masterworks; ML 5264	John Sebastian Plays Bach	LP	Contains performances of three Bach sonatas originally composed for flute, or flute and piano. With Paul Ulanowsky, piano. Reissued on vinyl as Columbia Special Products P 14210 in late 1970s.
1959	Deutsche Grammophon Gesellschaft; DGS 712015	A Harmonica Recital	LP	Different recording than Sebastian's 1940 Schirmer release of same name. With Renato Josi, harpsichord and piano. Contains performances of three baroque works by Veracini, Telemann, and Bach; three modern works by Milhaud, Hovhaness, and Ravel; and Sebastian's own composition "Etude Ala Flamenca".
1960	Decca; DL 10025	Profile of John Sebastian	LP	With Glen Clugston, piano. Contains "Hungarian Dance No. 6" (Brahms), "Serenade" (Sebastian), "March from 'Love for Three Oranges'" (Prokofieff-Heifetz), "Prélude à l'après-midi d'un faune" (Debussy-Heifetz), "An American in Paris" (Gershwin), "Ritual Fire Dance" (de Falla), "Melodie" (Gluck), "Prelude No. 2" (Gershwin), "Rumanian Folk Dances" (Bartók), "Largo from Concerto Grosso in D Min., Op. 3, No. 11" (Vivaldi), and "The Harmonica Player" (Guion).
1968	Heliodor; HS 25064	John Sebastian Plays Villa-Lobos/ Tcherepnin Concertos for Harmonica	LP	Contains Sebastian's 1959 performances of the Villa-Lobos and Tcherepnin concertos composed for him, accompanied by the Stuttgart Radio Symphony Orchestra. Later released on CD as Urania US 5146.

== See also ==
- Larry Adler
- Tommy Reilly (harmonica player)
