= Good Rockin' Charles =

American singer

- Also known as: Charles Edwards
- Born: Henry Lee Bester; March 4, 1933; Tuscaloosa, Alabama, United States
- Died: May 17, 1989 (aged 56) Chicago, Illinois, United States
- Genres: Chicago blues, electric blues
- Occupations: Harmonicist, singer, songwriter
- Instruments: Harmonica, vocals
- Years active: 1950s–1989
- Label: P-Vine

Good Rockin' Charles (March 4, 1933 – May 17, 1989) was an American Chicago blues and electric blues harmonicist, singer and songwriter. He released one album in his lifetime and is best known for his work with Johnny "Man" Young, Otis "Big Smokey" Smothers, Arthur "Big Boy" Spires and Jimmy Rogers.

== Biography ==
He was born Henry Lee Bester in Tuscaloosa, Alabama, and was later known as Charles Edwards. He relocated from his birthplace to Chicago, Illinois, in 1949, and was inspired by the harmonica players Sonny Boy Williamson I, Sonny Boy Williamson II and Little Walter. In the following decade, Charles found steady work with the Chicago blues musicians Johnny "Man" Young, Otis "Big Smokey" Smothers and Arthur "Big Boy" Spires. In 1955 he was a member of the backing band for the blues singer Jimmy Rogers. Two years later, the short-lived independent record label Cobra Records offered Charles the opportunity to record his own work, but he turned it down.

Because of his wariness of working in a recording studio, he had been replaced at the last minute as the harmonica player on Jimmy Rogers's recording of "Walking by Myself" (1956). The role fell to Big Walter Horton, who greatly enhanced his reputation by playing on the track.

In 1975, Charles was persuaded to record his own album. The eponymous album was released by Mr. Blues Records in 1976, having been recorded the previous November. It was subsequently reissued by P-Vine Records. Charles also featured on the American Blues Legends '79 tour of Europe organized by Big Bear Records, and the album of the same name.

Charles later suffered from ill health and was unable to record any significant further work.

Charles died in Chicago in May 1989, aged 56. In 2016 the Killer Blues Headstone Project placed the headstone for him at Mt. Glenwood Cemetery in Willow Springs, Illinois.

== Discography ==
Year	Title	Record label
1976	Good Rockin' Charles	Mr. Blues Records / P-Vine Records
1979	American Blues Legends '79	Big Bear Records

== See also ==
- List of Chicago blues musicians
- List of harmonicists
