= Dazkarieh =

Traditional Portuguese music band

- Origin: Portugal
- Genres: Portuguese traditional music, alternative rock, neofolk
- Years active: 1999–2014
- Labels: Hepta Trad, Seiva, Sopro
- Members: Joana Negrão; Rui Rodrigues; João Campos; Vasco Ribeiro Casais; Luís Peixoto
- Website: www.dazkarieh.com

Dazkarieh was a traditional Portuguese music band that began in 1999. The alternative rock and neofolk band consists of musicians Joana Negrão, Rui Rodrigues, João Campos and Vasco Ribeiro Casais. They have released a total of seven albums. Switzerland, Canada, Belgium, Mexico, Cape Verde, Czech Republic, Spain, Austria, Estonia and especially Germany, are some of the countries through which already exhibited their original sounds, inspired by various world cultures and based in the most diverse instruments, which include Galician gaita, accordion, western concert flute, tin whistle, African percussion instruments, Arabic percussion, bass and guitar. Initially the group was producing sounds that center on an imaginary vocal language, created by the group, for the purpose of treating the clear voice as a standalone instrument, comparable to the others.

== Discography ==
=== 2002 - Dazkarieh I ===
1. Abour Safar
2. kriamideah I
3. kriamideah II
4. kriamideah III
5. Elgtue
6. Gherunaai
7. Troligh ol 'Jighil I
8. Troligh ol 'Jighil II
9. Miafarê Boi
10. Cly

=== 2004 - Dazkarieh II - Espanta Espíritos ===
1. Sansorgui
2. Orubamba
3. Rosa de Lava
4. Zahrany
5. Nangbar
6. Mìura
7. Dazambra
8. Naty
9. Na Sei

=== 2006 - Incógnita Alquimia ===
1. Senhora da Azenha
2. Nyckel Power
3. Meninas Vamos à Murta
4. Água-Mãe
5. Olhos de Maré
6. Cantaria
7. Na Boca do Lobo
8. Cadafalso
9. HG From Hell
10. Estrela de Cinco Pontas
11. Incógnita Alquimia
12. Vitorina

=== 2009 - Hemisférios ===
==== CD1 ====
1. Intro
2. Caminhos Turvos
3. Lua Imersa
4. Instantes
5. Longe, em Segredo
6. Sáfaro
7. Água Forte
8. Voo Longe
9. Sinapse
10. Leve Accordar

==== CD2 ====
1. Intro
2. Baile da Meia Volta
3. Eras Tão Bonita
4. Coroar
5. Virgem
6. Borda d´Água (Prelúdio)
7. Borda d´Água
8. Sanfona
9. Alvorada Sanabresa / Antigo Baile Agarrado
10. Romance
11. Recordai
12. Embalo

=== 2011 - Ruído do Silêncio ===
1. Lilaré dos Cinco Sentidos
2. Sons de Pó
3. Mazurka da Água
4. Tempo Chão
5. Da Minha Janela
6. Moda da Ceifa
7. Moda da Ceifa II
8. Manhãzinha de S. João
9. Repasseado da Calçada
10. Nas Tuas Mãos
11. Légua da Póvo
12. Ruído do Silêncio

=== 2012 - Eterno Retorno ===
1. (Ir)Real
2. Terra escura
3. Embalo ao nascer do sol
4. Quatro ciclos
5. Sei que nao sei
6. Guardar segredo
7. Folha vazia
8. Contos de cordel
9. Tronco
10. Sombra
11. Ladainha do lago
12. Primeiro olhar

=== 2014 - Finisterra ===
1. A Senhora do Leite
2. Quase Um Repasseado
3. Divina Santa Cruz
4. Lá Cima Ó Castelo
5. Bravio
6. Margaça
7. Adufada
8. Rumba Cega (with Cabra Çega)
9. Melancolia
10. Primeiro Olhar (with Matilde Castro)
11. As Canseiras Desta Vida (Cover of José Mário Branco)
