= Joe Powers =

External videos
- "Harmonica Virtuoso Joe Powers." Oregon Public Broadcasting.

Joe Powers is an internationally acclaimed harmonica player, composer, and recording artist. He performs many music genres, such as classical, blues, jazz-fusion, and world traditions, and specializes in playing Argentine Tango music. Powers started playing the harmonica at two years of age, and majored in music composition at the University of Oregon. He has traveled to many countries to perform his music, and has been characterized as a "virtuoso". In 2005 he won a prize for his work at the quadrennial World Harmonica Championship in Germany, and at a Belgian competition in 2008 he won the classical division. Powers is from Portland, Oregon but now resides in the United Kingdom.

== Discography ==
The following are albums from Joe Powers.

- Amor de Tango (2007)
- Mélancolie (2009)
- Just Duet! (2012)
- Apasionado (2015)
- Con Ojos Nuevos (2022)

== See also ==
- List of harmonicists
