= Trossingen Railway =

Railway line in Germany

Coordinates: 48.0740°N 8.6319°E

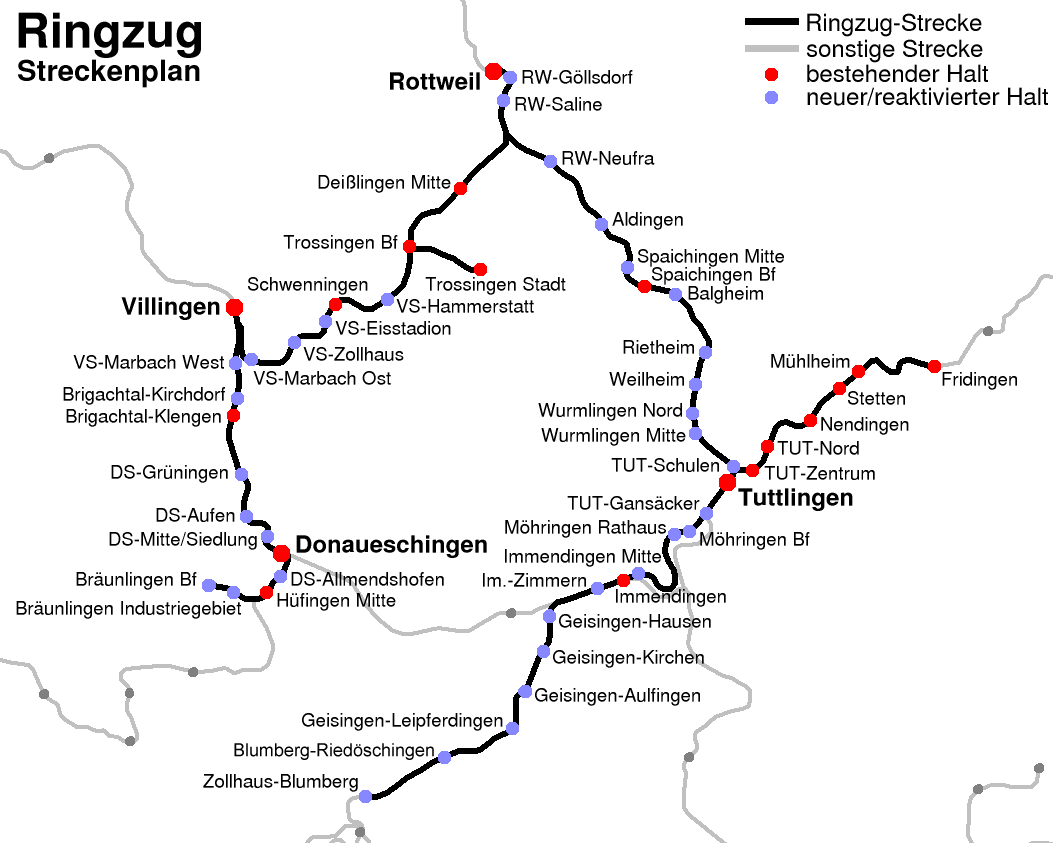
- The Trossingen Railway as part of the Ringzug network

Overview
- Native name: Trossinger Eisenbahn
- Line number: 9463
- Locale: Baden-Württemberg, Germany
- Termini: Trossingen station; Trossingen Stadt

Service
- Route number: 742.1

Technical
- Line length: 3.9 km (2.4 mi)
- Track gauge: 1,435 mm (4 ft 8 1/2 in) standard gauge
- Minimum radius: 190 m (623.4 ft)
- Electrification: 600 V DC
- Operating speed: 80 km/h (49.7 mph) (maximum)
- Maximum incline: 3.5%

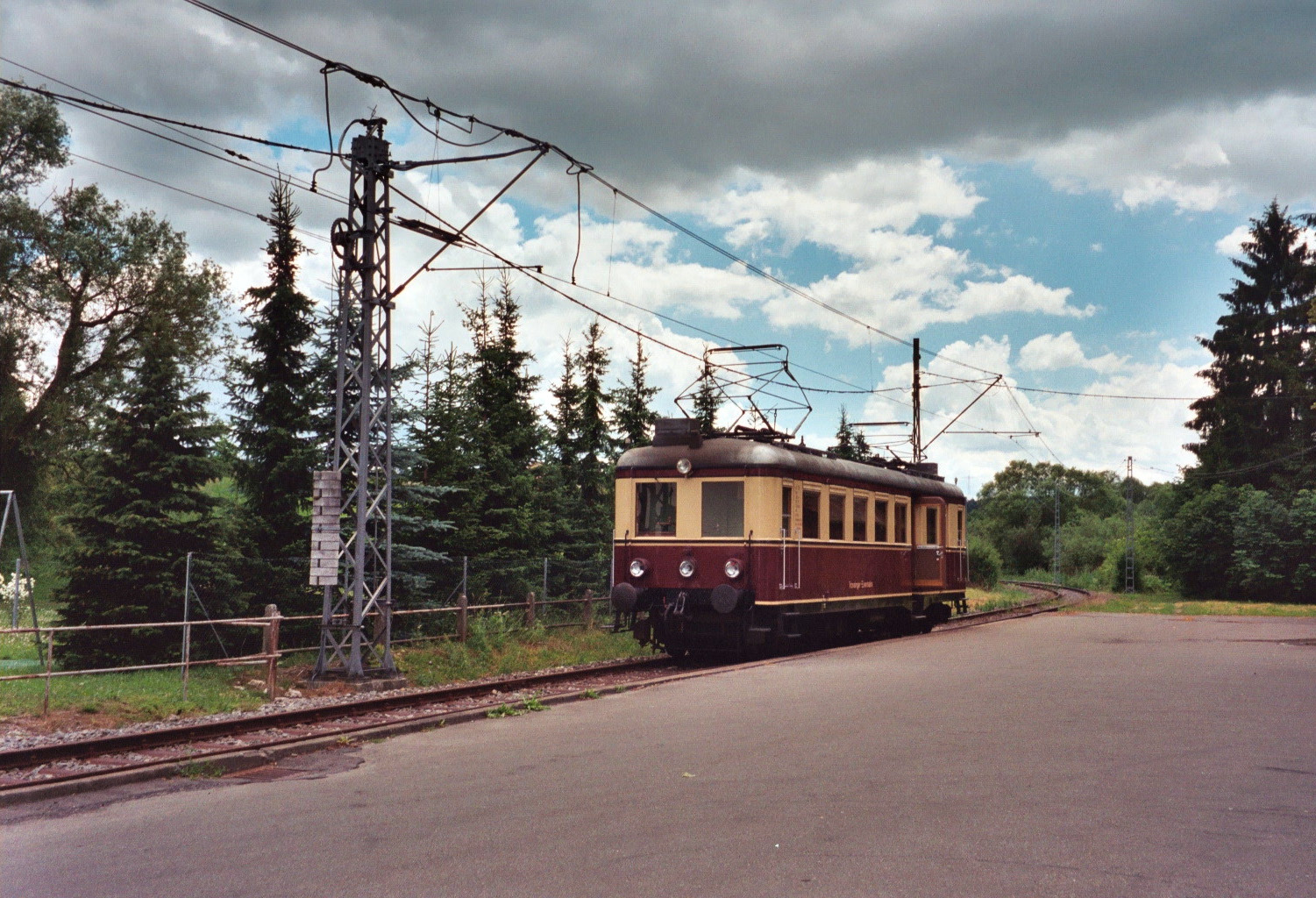
June 2003: a T3 railcar in Trossingen station before reconstruction

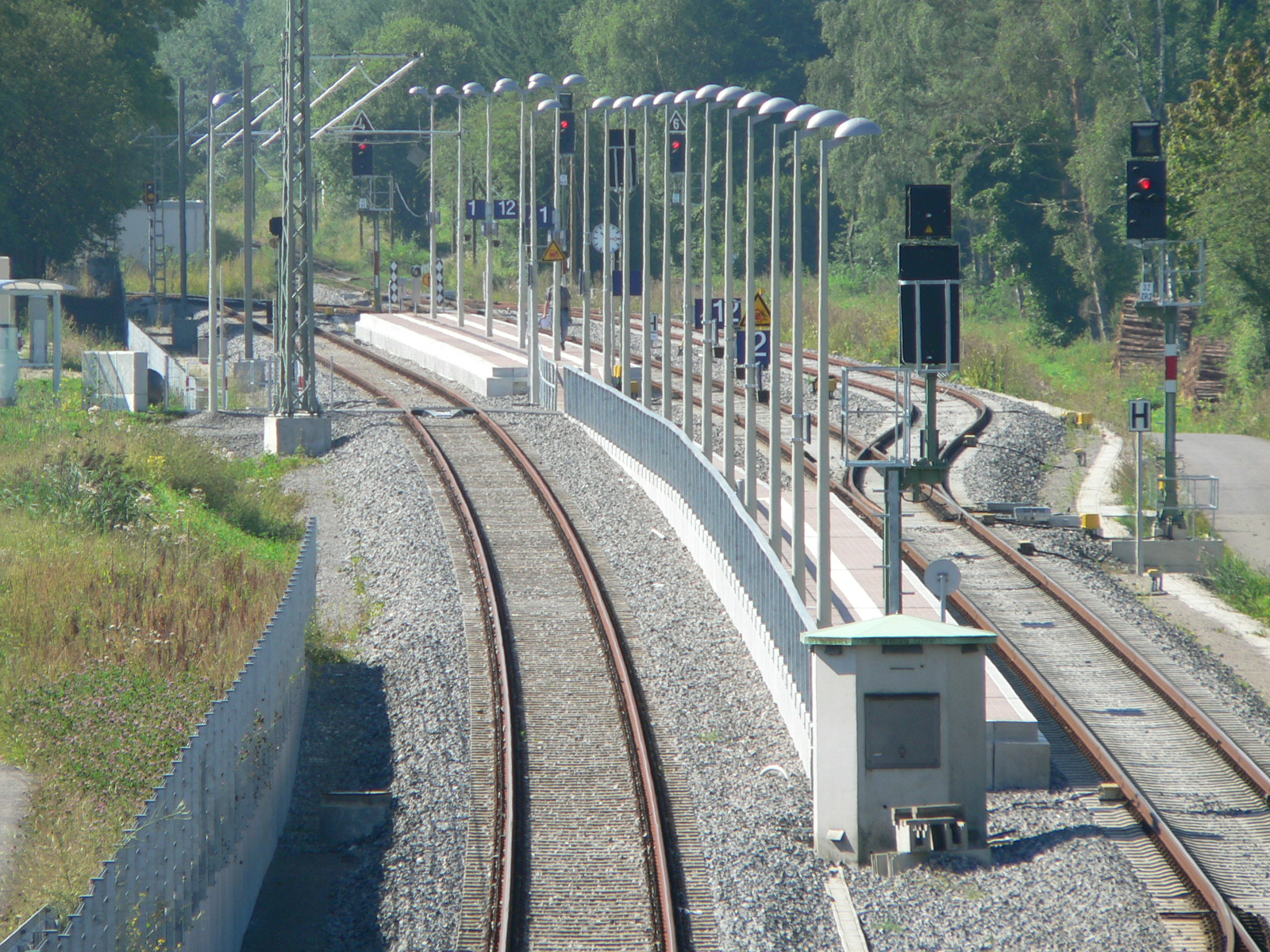
Trossingen station following reconstruction

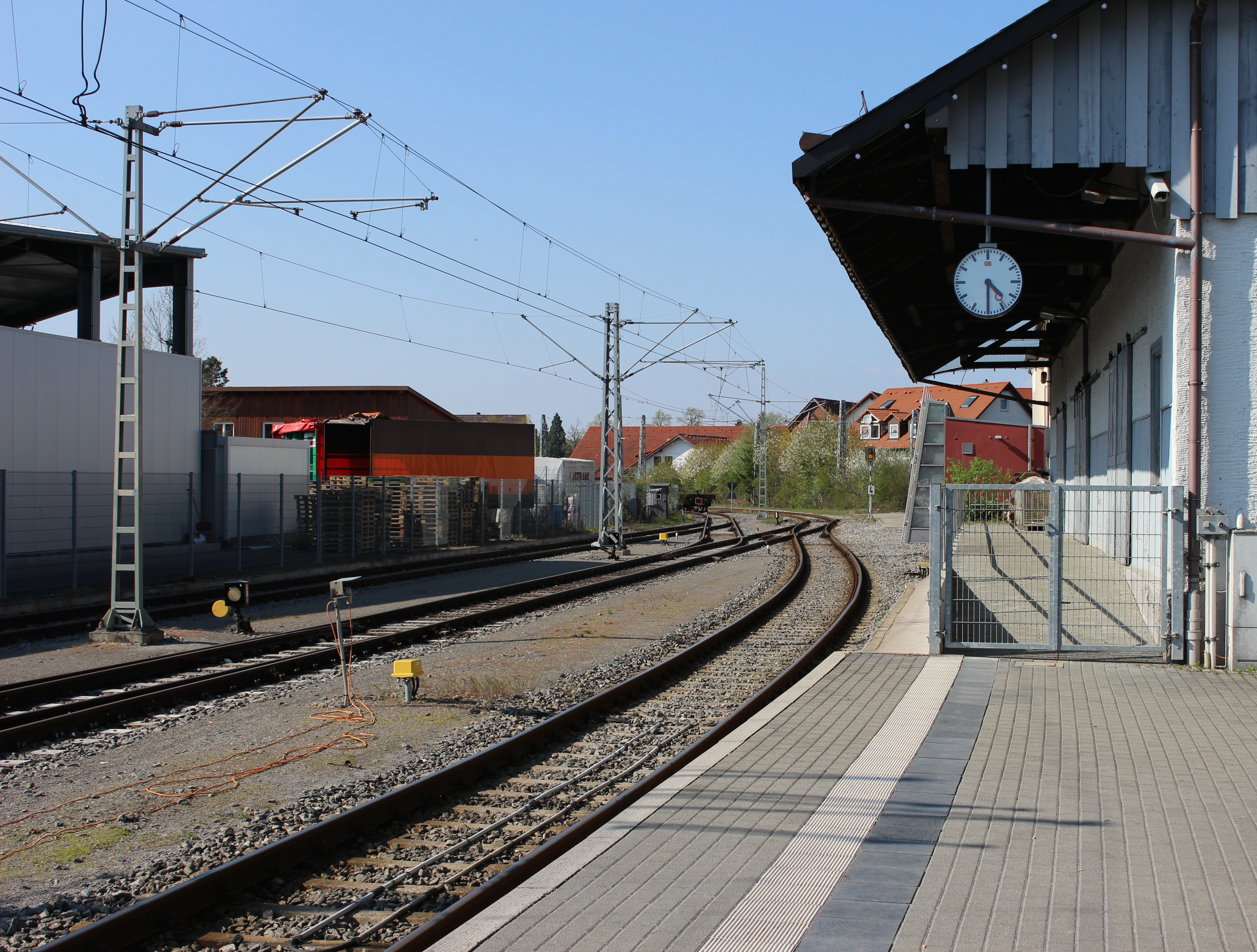
Trossingen Stadt station

The Trossingen Railway (Trossinger Eisenbahn, TE) is a DC-electrified branch line in the German state of Baden-Württemberg. The branch line has connected the town of Trossingen with Trossingen station, which is located on its periphery, since 1897. Trossingen station (formerly called Trossingen Staatsbahnhof—"state station") is on the Rottweil–Villingen railway. The railway is not part of the Deutsche Bahn network; instead it is owned by Stadtwerke Trossingen GmbH. This company formerly operated the railway, but since 2003, operations have been carried out by the Hohenzollerische Landesbahn (HzL). Freight operations were abandoned in 1996.

== History ==
When the Royal Württemberg State Railways (Königlich Württembergischen Staats-Eisenbahnen) opened the Rottweil–Villingen railway on 26 August 1869, Trossingen was not included in the route of the line. The new line ran about four kilometres in a straight line to the north of Trossingen. Despite the economic growth as a result of increasing industrialisation, in particular in the musical instrument industry (for instance Hohner), Trossingen found itself increasingly isolated. Therefore, committed citizens of the town tried in subsequent years to improve the transport situation and when the state railway had shown no interest they ended up agreeing to establish a private company.

To this end, the AG Elektrizitätswerk und Verbindungsbahn Trossingen (“Trossingen Electrical Works and Connecting Railway”) was established in 1896 and the appropriate license for the new line was issued on 31 December 1897. Because a power station was built nearby in Trossingen at the same time, the projected line was to be electrified. The relatively steep slope of the track—it climbed 66 metres towards the town—also favoured electric operations. The new railway was finally opened on 14 December 1898. It was taken over by the town of Trossingen in 1908 and it has been operated ever since as a municipal utility.

The Trossinger Railway is unusual in that it does not use the 15 kV/16.7 Hz electrical system that eventually became normal in Germany. It also does not abut any other electrified railway lines.

Since the 1990s, the line has been considered in danger of being closed, but instead it was saved by being integrating into the Ringzug concept of the Schwarzwald-Baar-Heuberg planning region. Consequently, diesel-powered Regio-Shuttle railcars, operated by the HzL, took over the operation of all traffic on the Trossingen Railway in 2003. Some of the services run via Villingen-Schwenningen and Donaueschingen to Bräunlingen.

The catenary has not been needed in scheduled operations since Friday, 11 July 2003 and the electrical infrastructure is now only used in museum operations. However, two vintage railcars were temporarily restored to scheduled operations from December 2004 because the Ringzug was short of rolling stock.

== Historic vehicle park ==
Type	Designation	Year built	Manufacturer	Electricals	Remarks
Railcar	T1; Zeug Christe	1898	MAN	AEG	One of the oldest operational electric railway vehicles in the world
Railcar	T2	1898	MAN	AEG	Retired in 1961
Carriage	B2 Lias	1898	MAN	–	Formerly B3, B7 from 1938, replaced in 1952 as B6 with the chassis of B5, B2 from 1968
Carriage	B5	1900/ 1906	Ganz / Hannoversche Waggonfabrik AG	–	1900 built as a steam railcar, converted to a passenger carriage in 1906, in Trossingen from 1908, called a "lounge car", dismantled in 1952 with chassis going to B2
Carriage	B7	1913	Waggonfabrik Rastatt	–	B6 until 1952, retired in 1965, scrapped in 1967
Goods wagon	G4	1898	MAN	–	Whereabouts unknown
Locomotive	EL4 Lina	1902	AEG	AEG	
Towing railcar	T3	1938	Maschinenfabrik Esslingen	AEG	Called a "Sunday carriage"
Railcar	T5	1956	Maschinenfabrik Esslingen	Siemens-Schuckertwerke	
Railcar	T6	1968	Waggonfabrik Rastatt	Siemens-Schuckertwerke	Displayed from 2003 to 2005 in the Familienpark Villingen-Schwenningen

== Trossingen Stadt station ==
The Trossingen Stadt terminus now has only one platform track for passenger traffic. The remaining three tracks are used for the railway museum.

In addition to connecting services to trains in Trossingen Station, some Ringzug services also run directly to Villingen and Bräunlingen.

In Trossingen Stadt station there are connections to the following bus routes (as of 2014):

- 51 Trossingen – Tuttlingen ZOB (central bus station)
- 52 Trossingen – Tuningen
- 53 Trossingen – Spaichingen
- 57 Trossingen – Weigheim
- 21/22 Trossingen – Aldingen/Trossingen – Aldingen – Aixheim

== Museum ==
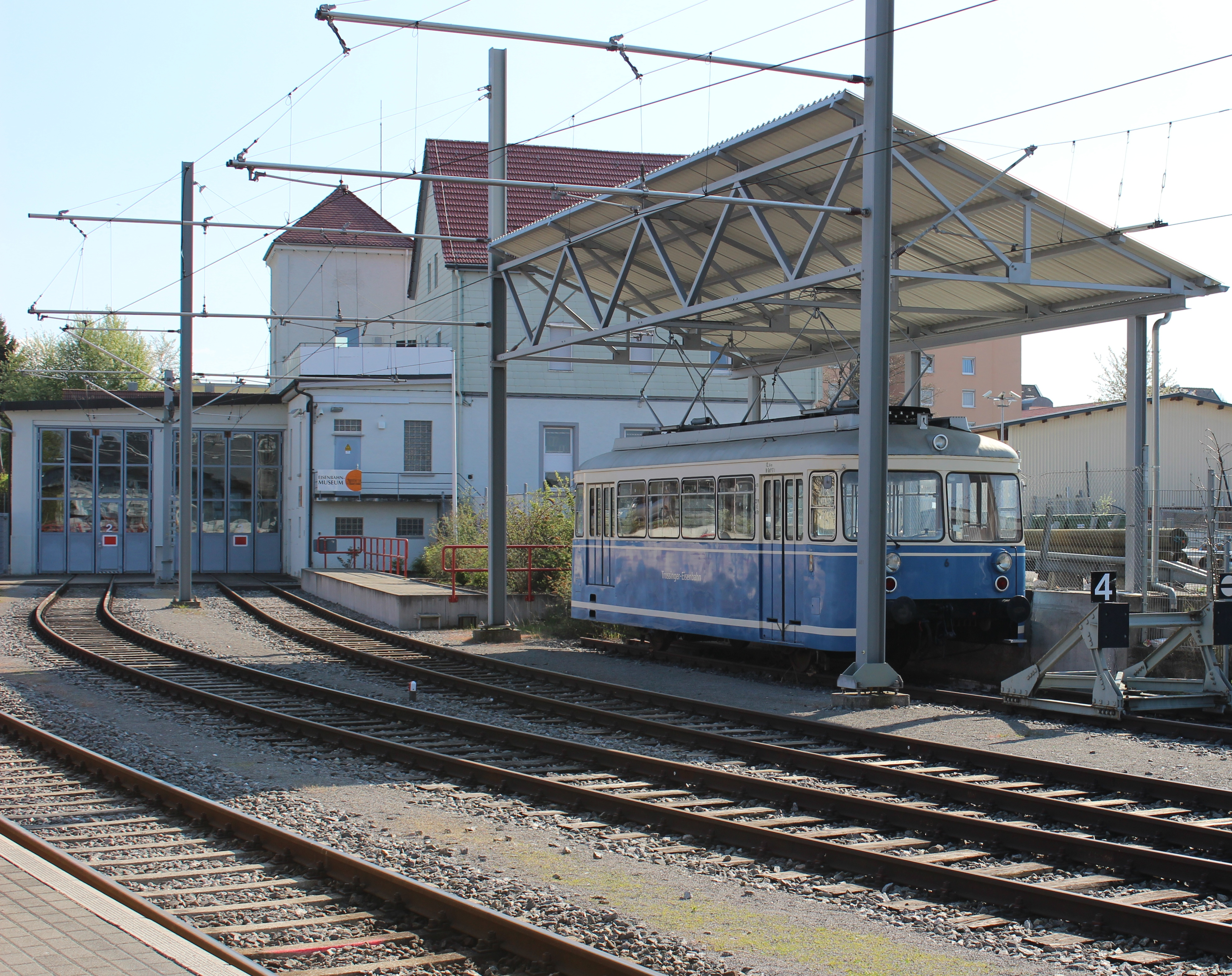
T6 railcar with the museum in the background

A small museum of items from the Trossinger Railway has been located in the roundhouse at Trossingen Stadt station since 5 June 2005. Most of the historic rolling stock have been housed here. The Freundeskreis der Trossinger Eisenbahn (Friends of the Trossinger Railway) is involved in the Museum. This was established on 7 September 2004 and its first official excursion trip ran on 1 May 2005. The T1 railcars are said to be the world's oldest operational electric railway vehicles.
