= Charlie Sayles =

American blues harmonica player (born 1948)

- Born: Charles Warner Sayles; January 4, 1948 (age 78); Woburn, Massachusetts, U.S.
- Genres: Chicago blues
- Occupations: Harmonicist, singer and songwriter
- Instruments: Harmonica, vocals
- Years active: 1970s–present

Charles Warner Sayles (born January 4, 1948) is an American Chicago blues harmonicist, singer and songwriter. At various times, Sayles has played alongside Pete Seeger, Bobby Parker, Deborah Coleman, and Bill Monroe. He has had three albums issued on JSP Records. His most recent release was Charlie Sayles and the Blues Disciples (2015).

== Life and career ==
He was born in Woburn, Massachusetts. From a broken home, Sayles spent his childhood moving from one foster home to another. In the late 1960s, he enlisted in the Army, was posted to the 101st Airborne Division, and sent to fight in the Vietnam War. Whilst serving, Sayles heard a fellow soldier play the harmonica, and later listened to a B.B. King record on the radio. Both experiences ignited his interest and, after his tour of duty in Vietnam ended, he served his final six months in Germany. He bought some Hohner harmonicas at that time and, in 1971, took them back to the United States on his discharge from military service. He resided in Massachusetts and, in making a slow transition back to civilian life after three years in the infantry, started to learn to play the harmonica by trying to copy the records of Sonny Boy Williamson II. By 1974, Sayles had started drifting and playing his harmonica on the streets, moving to Atlanta and then New York City. In the latter location he met Ralph Rinzler, an organizer of the Smithsonian Folklife Festival in Washington, D.C., who arranged for Sayles to appear on the Festival's bill in 1976. Sayles was paired with Pete Seeger and they made several appearances. The same year, Sayles recorded Goin' Up - Goin' Down - The Raw Harmonica Blues of Charlie Sayles, which was released by Dusty Road Records. Also in 1976, he had an educational album issued, Charlie Sayles: Harp Instruction Record. Rinzler arranged for Sayles to play at a few other festivals and Sayles relocated to live in Washington, D.C.

Sayles developed his own style of playing by performing regularly on street corners and in subways. He attempted to project as full an overall sound as possible, using extended phrasing and rapid register changes. He found occasional employment as a laborer when money was tight. With assistance from Rinzler, by 1979 Sayles had acquired his own backing band in Washington, D.C. This presented a challenge as he then needed to adapt his playing, to suit having other instruments in the mix. Sayles continued to work on his own song writing ability, as he often found it difficult to play other harmonicist's tunes. Sayles lost his right eye and several teeth when he was attacked on the street. He was married for eight years to a woman who played bass guitar in Sayles backing ensemble. However as the marriage fell apart, so did the band, and Sayles was left where he started out playing on the streets. Sayles became a born again Christian at this time, a faith he has maintained.

His recording career started again in 1990, after a long break. He recorded Night Ain't Right for the British JSP Records label, and the collection contained many of Sayles own compositions. AllMusic commented "The key to the record's success is the way Sayles twists conventions around, finding tastes of flourishes funk and jazz within the genre's boundaries. His willingness to play with the music is the reason why Night Ain't Right is a modern-day Chicago blues record worth exploring". The follow-up, I've Got Something to Say (1995), was produced by the Washington guitarist, Bobby Parker, with Deborah Coleman making a guest appearance on guitar. Hip Guy was released in 2000, which again saw Sayles combine Chicago blues, New Orleans funk and elements of rock and roll in his unique style. However, outside of Sayles general East Coast location, sales figures for all three albums were modest.

More recently, Sayles received funding from the National Endowment for the Arts to teach harmonica playing to prisoners. A photograph taken at one of those lessons appeared on the back cover of his most recent recording. In 2015, Sayles fortunes changed again when he had the opportunity to record another album. He utilised assistance from his landlord, the guitarist Tony Fazio, and the recording team at Fetal Records. His band is known as the Blues Disciples, with Sayles singing and playing the harmonica, Fazio on rhythm and bass guitar, plus drummer Greg Phillips.

== Discography ==
Year	Title	Record label	Additional credits
1976	Goin' Up - Goin' Down - The Raw Harmonica Blues of Charlie Sayles	Dusty Road Records	
1976	Charlie Sayles: Harp Instruction Record	None credited	
1990	Night Ain't Right	JSP Records	
1995	I Got Something to Say	JSP Records	
2000	Charlie Sayles: Hip Guy	JSP Records	
2015	Charlie Sayles and the Blues Disciples	Fetal Records	Charlie Sayles and the Blues Disciples featuring Tony the Legend Fazio

== See also ==
- List of harmonicists
