= Sally Cline =

English writer (1938–2022)

Sally Cline FRSA
- Born: 5 January 1938; London, U.K.
- Died: September 2022 (aged 84)
- Occupations: Writer, biographer, journalist, editor, instructor
- Spouse: Larry Adler (m. 1969, div. 1977)
- Relatives: Jerry Adler (brother-in-law)

Sally Irene Cline (5 January 1938 – September 2022) was a British writer and editor, best known for her biographies of Radclyffe Hall, Dashiell Hammett, and Zelda Fitzgerald. She was a fellow of the Royal Society of Arts.

== Early life and education ==
Cline was born in London, the daughter of A. T. Cline. She graduated from Durham University with an arts degree and earned a master's degree in literature from Lancaster University. Her master's thesis was titled "Lesbian Feminist Versions: Construction of a New Reality" (1982).

== Career ==
Cline was a lifestyle journalist as a young woman. Later she wrote biographies, short stories, and books of nonfiction. Her biography of Radclyffe Hall was shortlisted for the Lambda Literary Award for Lesbian Memoir or Biography. She edited a series on writing for Bloomsbury Publishing. She was director of the Royal Literary Fund Writers Pool Mentoring Scheme. She taught writing courses at Cambridge University, Anglia Ruskin University, and City University London.

== Publications ==
- "The Case of Beatrice: An Analysis of the Word Lesbian and the Power of Language to Control Women" (1984)
- Reflecting Men at Twice Their Natural Size (1987, with Dale Spender)
- Just Desserts: Women and Food (1990)
- Women, Celibacy and Passion (1993)
- Lifting The Taboo: Women Death and Dying (1995)
- Radclyffe Hall: A Woman Named John (1998)
- Couples: Scene from the Inside (1998)
- Zelda Fitzgerald: Her Voice in Paradise (2002)
- The Arvon Book of Life Writing (2010, co-editor, with Carole Angier)
- The Arvon Book of Literary Non-Fiction (2012, co-editor, with Midge Gillies)
- Dashiell Hammett: Man of Mystery (2014)
- Literary Non-Fiction: A Writers' & Artists' Companion (2015, with Midge Gillies)
- After Agatha: Women Write Crime (2022)

== Personal life ==
In 1960, Cline married Neville Samuel Gaffin. Cline married her second husband, American musician Larry Adler, in 1969. They had a daughter and they divorced in 1977. "At different times in her life she has been heterosexual, lesbian, married, separated, divorced," noted a 1993 profile of Cline. She died in 2022, at the age of 84.
