= Luís Peixoto =

Portuguese folk musician

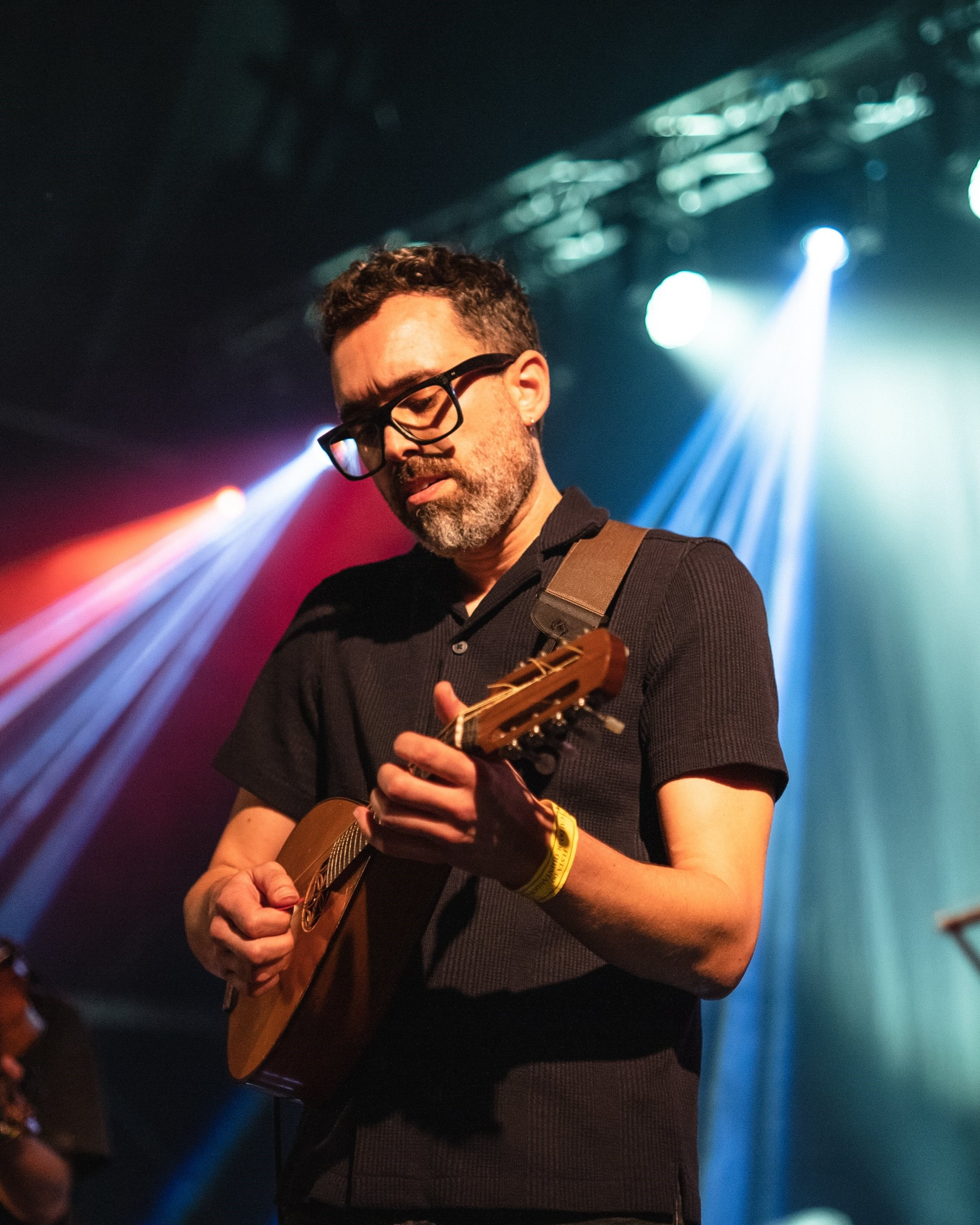
Luís Peixoto playing live presenting his album Geodesia at Quintandona Festival in Portugal (2023)

Luís Peixoto (born April 11, 1980) is a Portuguese folk musician.

== Early life and education ==
Peixoto was born in Coimbra, Portugal, and grew up in the Algarve. He studied civil engineering at the University of Coimbra.

== Music career ==
Peixoto was a part of Dazkarieh for six years, as well as the Stockholm Lisboa Project. His first solo album, Assimétrico (2017), incorporated electronic influences. His second album, Geodesia (2021), was a collaboration with Ciscu Cardona and Rubén Bada, as well as a number of guests from other Iberian and non-Iberian regions. In it, he returned to acoustic roots, playing mainly mandolin.
