= Stockholm Lisboa Project =

Portuguese/Swedish folk music band

- Origin: Stockholm, Sweden; Lisbon, Portugal
- Genres: Folk music Fado; World music
- Years active: 2006–present
- Members: Simon Stålspets; Sérgio Crisóstomo; Rita Maria; Alice Andersson
- Past members: Liana; Luis Peixoto; Micaela Vaz; Filip Jers
- Website: stockholmlisboa.com

Stockholm Lisboa Project is a Portuguese/Swedish folk music band.

== History ==
Founded in 2006 they are based in Sweden and Portugal, and have received the German Record Critics' Award (2009 and 2013), was selected for a showcase at Womex in Copenhagen. The band was nominated to the Songlines Music Awards 2010 and also the Swedish Folk & World Music Awards 2012.

The group has played live radio concerts for RDP in Portugal (2007, 2008, 2009), SR in Sweden (2007), WDR in Germany (2009), NDR in Germany (2016), YLE in Finland (2008), Spanish National Radio (2011) as well as concerts in festivals and concert halls around the world.

== Line-up ==
=== Current members ===
- Simon Stålspets – nordic mandola, Goat Horn, willow flute, harmonica, vocals
- Sérgio Crisóstomo – violin, vocals
- Rita Maria – lead vocals
- Alice Andersson – saxophone, vocals

=== Past members ===
- Liana – vocalist (member from 2006~2011, participated on the records "Sol" (2007) & "Diagonal" (2009))
- Luis Peixoto – mandolin (member from 2006~2007, participated on the record "Sol" (2007))
- Micaela Vaz – vocalist
- Filip Jers – harmonica

== Discography ==
- 2007: Sol
- 2009: Diagonal
- 2012: Aurora
- 2016: Janela
