= Jerry Adler (harmonica player) =

American musician (1918-2010)

- Adler in 1941 on the set of Pot o' Gold

Background information
- Born: Hilliard Gerald Adler; October 30, 1918; Baltimore, Maryland
- Died: March 13, 2010 (aged 91)
- Occupation: Musician
- Instrument: Harmonica

Hilliard Gerald Adler (October 30, 1918 – March 13, 2010) was an American harmonica player whose performances have been used in numerous film soundtracks.

Adler was born in Baltimore, and early in his childhood mastered the harmonica, winning a local talent contest sponsored by the Baltimore Evening Sun at age 13. His older brother Larry Adler, four years his senior, had won the same contest five years earlier, performing the same piece, Beethoven's Minuet in G.

Later, Adler found work with Paul Whiteman and performed regularly with his orchestra. After starting his solo career, he joined the Army Air Corps, where he did theater and film work in the entertainment division.

Adler focused on popular music as his career developed, and he soloed in numerous film soundtracks from the 1940s to the 1960s, including Shane, High Noon, Mary Poppins, and My Fair Lady. He also taught actors how to pretend to play the instrument convincingly where their on-screen performances required.

He published an autobiography, Living from Hand to Mouth, in 2005.

Jerry Adler died of prostate cancer in 2010, aged 91.
