= Neustadt (Schwarzw) station =

Railway station in Titisee-Neustadt, Germany

Neustadt (Schwarzw)
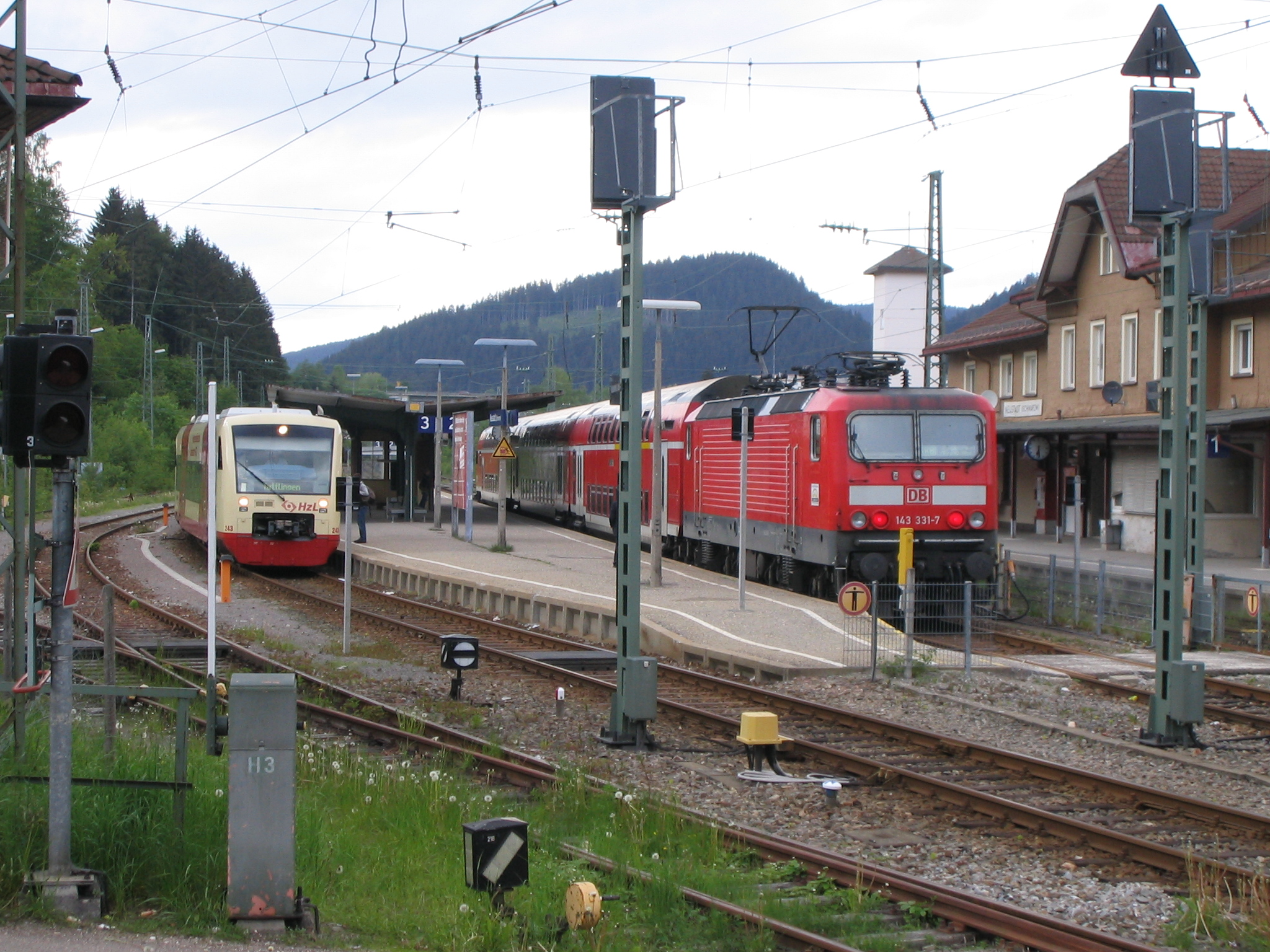
- A Regionalbahn service on the Höllentalbahn and a Ringzug DMU in Neustadt station

General information
- Location: Bahnhofstr. 1, Neustadt, Titisee-Neustadt, Baden-Württemberg; Germany
- Coordinates: 47°54′37″N 8°12′39″E
- Line: Freiburg (Breisgau)–Donaueschingen (km 34.9)
- Platforms: 3

Construction
- Accessible: Yes

Other information
- Station code: 4451
- DS100 code: RNSS
- IBNR: 8004331
- Category: 5
- Fare zone: RVF: C; WTV: RVF (RVF transitional tariff, select season tickets only)
- Website: www.bahnhof.de

History
- Opened: 21 May 1887; 139 years ago
- Electrified: 18 June 1936; 90 years ago

Services
Preceding station	Breisgau S-Bahn	Following station
Titisee towards Breisach	S1	Terminus
Titisee towards Freiburg Hbf	S10	Rötenbach (Baden) towards Villingen (Schwarzwald)
Titisee towards Endingen am Kaiserstuhl	S11	Terminus
Location

Neustadt (Schwarzwald) station is one of two stations in Titisee-Neustadt in the German state of Baden-Württemberg. The other is Titisee. It is located in Neustadt at 805 metres above sea level on the Höllentalbahn, which links Freiburg with Donaueschingen. The station has three platform tracks and is classified by Deutsche Bahn (DB) as a category 5 station. Established in 1887, the entrance building is now heritage-listed and houses among other things a DB agency with ticket sales.

== Location ==
Neustadt station is approximately 200 metres west of the centre of Neustadt, a district of the municipality of Titisee-Neustadt. The station building is east of the tracks and has the address of Bahnhofstrasse 1. The station area is to the west of Bahnhofstrasse and Saiger Straße (street) crosses over the station tracks at a level crossing at the southern end of the station. North of the station there is another level crossing over Schwarzenbachweg. State road 172 crosses the station tracks using a bridge that spans the entire valley including the Gutach river and Gutachstraße. To the east of the station is a wooded area, which federal highway 31 passes through. There is commuter parking next to Saiger Straße.

Neustadt station is a through station on the Höllentalbahn ("Hell Valley Railway", line number 4300), which runs from Freiburg to Donaueschingen. The Höllentalbahn is a single-track mainline and since 2019 is fully electrified. In the Deutsche Bahn timetable, the line from Donaueschingen to Freiburg is listed in table 727 and the formerly non-electrified section from Neustadt to Donaueschingen is listed in table 755.

== History ==
Construction of the first part of the Höllentalbahn from Freiburg to Neustadt began in 1882 and the line was opened by the Grand Duchy of Baden State Railways (Großherzoglich Badische Staatseisenbahnen) on 21 May 1887. Neustadt station was built as a terminus station with facilities for maintaining steam locomotives and a roundhouse. A goods shed and a loading dock were available for freight traffic and a siding was built to the Fürstlich-Fürstenberg paper mill a few years after the opening of the line. Due to a shortage of funds, the extension of the Höllentalbahn from Neustadt to Donaueschingen was delayed, so the line was not opened until 20 August 1901. This made Neustadt into a through station. In 1910, Neustadt received a fireless locomotive to handle operations on the siding to the paper mill. After the First World War, the station acquired another steam locomotive.

The Höllentalbahn was electrified from Freiburg to Neustadt in the 1930s. The system used had a voltage of 20,000 V at a frequency of 50 Hertz as Deutsche Reichsbahn wanted to investigate the suitability of mains power for railway operations. These experiments led to the development of the 25 kV AC electrification system, which is used in much of the world, but not in Germany. The electrical test operation began on 18 June 1936, with the construction costs amounting to 7 million Reichsmarks. The eastern Höllentalbahn from Neustadt to Donaueschingen, however, was not electrified, so trains running from Freiburg to Donaueschingen had to change locomotives in Neustadt. For this purpose, the station received a three-road roundhouse for the servicing of electric locomotives. For the steam and diesel locomotives, there was a two-road (rectangular) engine shed. Three platform tracks were available for passenger services at an island platform and a "house" platform (next to the station building) after the Second World War. On 20 May 1960, the Höllentalbahn was converted to the standard German electrification system (15 kV AC). In the 1980s, the fireless locomotives used for the paper mill siding were taken out of service and replaced by diesel locomotives until the closure of the mill in 1988. One steam locomotive was scrapped, while the other is still available as an historical exhibit. By the 1990s, the locomotive depot in Neustadt had become unnecessary because all rail services now terminated in Neustadt. The two engine sheds were then demolished. The two mechanical interlockings were decommissioned in 1991. The station is now remotely controlled from the signal box in Titisee.

== Facilities ==
The station building was built in 1887 with the opening of the Höllentalbahn. It is a two-storey plastered building with a small loft in the middle of the building. The station building formerly had service and waiting rooms; on the ground floor there was a signal box, a ticket office, a third-class waiting room and a first and second-class waiting room. Today the building is heritage-listed and it houses a ticket centre of Südbadenbus, a subsidiary of Deutsche Bahn.

The station has four tracks, three of which are platform tracks. Tracks 1 and 2 are used by trains to and from Freiburg. Usually these trains run on track 2. Track 3 is used by trains to and from Donaueschingen. Tracks 2 and 3 are located on an island platform, which is a reached by a passenger underpass. The height of the platforms above the railhead is 38 cm (15 in). The usable length and current use is as set out below.

Platforms
Track	Usable length	Platform height	Current use
1	218 m	38 cm	Individual Regionalbahn services towards Titisee, Himmelreich, Kirchzarten and Freiburg
2	213 m	38 cm	Regionalbahn services towards Titisee, Himmelreich, Kirchzarten and Freiburg
3	213 m	38 cm	Interregio-Express services towards Donaueschingen, Immendingen, Tuttlingen, Sigmaringen and Ulm; Regional-Express services towards Donaueschingen, Villingen and Rottweil

The electrification of the Höllentalbahn from Freiburg formerly ended in Neustadt. Thus, while electric trains ran from Freiburg, diesel trains ran to Donaueschingen. For this reason almost all trains terminated in Neustadt. But there was a train in the morning, which ended and started in Titisee. In recent years most of the diesel services were operated by diesel multiple units of class 611 and 628. Until its discontinuation in 2003, the Kleber-Express ran over the entire route of the Höllentalbahn but it did not use the electrification of the western section. Electrification of the remaining line to Donaueschingen was finished in 2020 and trains now run through to Villingen via Donaueschingen, interconecting with the Black Forest Railway from Offenburg to Constance at Lake Constance.

== Services ==
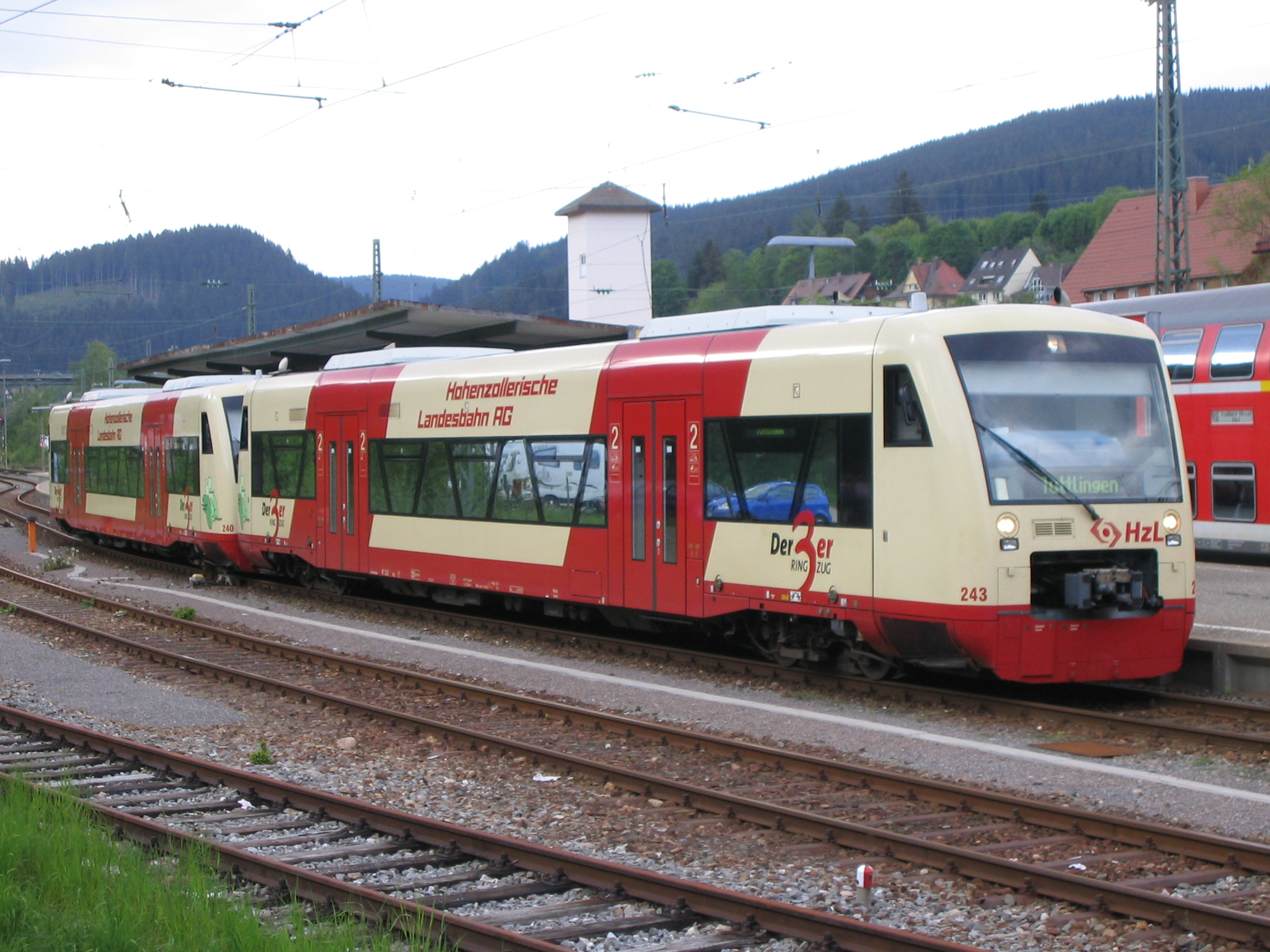
Ringzug service of the Hohenzollerische Landesbahn in Neustadt

=== Rail ===
==== Passengers ====
After the opening of the Höllentalbahn section from Neustadt to Freiburg in 1887, there were direct services from Neustadt to Freiburg. After the Höllentalbahn was extended to Donaueschingen in 1901, there were also through express services from Freiburg to Donaueschingen. Just a few years later there was also through trains to Ulm. When the western Höllentalbahn was electrified in 1936, the connections from Donaueschingen to Freiburg were partly broken, although most of the trains had locomotive changes in Neustadt. The operation of steam locomotives on the western Höllentalbahn was abandoned a few years after the electrification. In the 1980s, there were continuous express trains from Freiburg to Donaueschingen and some additional regional services, beginning in Neustadt. The express trains ran from Donaueschingen to Neustadt hauled by diesel locomotives and proceeding to Freiburg hauled by electric locomotives. In the early 1990s, almost all through connections on the Höllentalbahn were lost with services terminating in Neustadt. Double-deck sets have since been hauled by locomotives of class 143 on the western Höllentalbahn and DMUs of class 611 or class 628 run on the eastern Höllentalbahn.

With the completion of electrification between Neustadt and Donaueschingen in 2019, services began operating over the entire line, no longer terminating in Neustadt. As of the December 2021 timetable change, the following services stop at Neustadt (Schwarzw):

- Breisgau S-Bahn S1 / S10 / S11: half-hourly service to Freiburg, hourly service to Villingen (Schwarzwald), and additional trains west of Freiburg.

=== Buses ===
Neustadt station has a bus station, located next to the station building towards Freiburg. Neustadt is a hub for bus services In the network of Südbadenbus, a subsidiary of Deutsche Bahn. There are bus connections to Hüfingen, Löffingen, Lenzkirch, Bonndorf, Seebrugg, Feldberg and Hammereisenbach. There is a customer service centre for Südbadenbus in Neustadt.

== Sources ==
- Hans-Wolfgang Scharf; Burkhard Wollny (1987). Die Höllentalbahn. Von Freiburg in den Schwarzwald (in German). Freiburg im Breisgau: Eisenbahn-Kurier-Verlag. ISBN 3-88255-780-X.
- Jörg Sauter (2007). Die Eisenbahn im Höllental — Von Freiburg in den Hochschwarzwald (in German). Freiburg: Eisenbahn-Bildarchiv, EK-Verlag. ISBN 978-3-88255-370-3.
- DB Regio Südbaden (2011). Die Höllentalbahn — ein gutes Stück Schwarzwald. 125. Jubiläum der Höllentalbahn (in German). Freiburg.
