= Filip Jers =

Swedish harmonica player and composer (born 1986)

Filip Jers (born November 7, 1986, in south of Sweden) is a Swedish harmonica player and composer.

Filip Jers gained recognition after winning the World Harmonica Festival in Trossingen (2005).

He received the 2003 Musik Direkt jazzprize, 2003 Åmåls Junior Blues Prize, 2004 Danish Munspelsmästerskapen 1st prize, 2004 Musik Direkt Jeunesses Musicales International International prize, 2004 Höörs Community Cultureprize, 2005 World Harmonica Championships 1:a prize, 2006 Sundsgården Musicianscholarship, 2006 Lions Musicscholarship Höör, 2009 Royal College of Music Studentgrant, 2010 SWEJS Göteborg Jazz Scholarship, 2010 Harry Arnolds Jazz Standy-By Prize, 2010 Kungliga Musikaliska Akademien Jazzgrant and receiving the Alice Babs Jazz scholarship in 2012.

Filip Jers was the first harmonica student to be accepted and receive a diploma in harmonica by the Royal College of Music in Stockholm. He plays often as a guest soloist but also as a permanent member in Stockholm Lisboa Project, Primus Motor and Filip Jers Quartet.

== Discography ==
- In the Spirit of Toots, 2023 - Filip Jers & Carl Bagge Trio
- Filip Jers Quartet Plays Classical, 2022 (feat. Henrik Hallberg & Wille Alin)
- New Scandinavian Harmonica, Vol. 1, 2014 - Jouko Kyhälä & Filip Jers
- Diagonal, 2009 with Stockholm Lisboa Project
- Åka med, 2012 with Primus Motor
- Spiro, 2011, Solo CD
- Look to the West - West of Eden (guest appearance on Going to Hull)
