= Philip Achille =

British harmonica player

Philip Achille is a British harmonica player who attended Solihull School, a British private school in the West Midlands.

His achievements include:

- National Harmonica League Player of the Year 2005
- World Youth Solo Chromatic Harmonica Champion 2005
- World Open Harmonica Champion 2005
- Tabor Foundation Award 2006
- Birmingham International Jazz Festival Young Musician 2006
- Achille played the introduction section for Jon Bon Jovi's finale of the Royal Variety Performance 2007.
- Achille also played at Andrew Lloyd Webber's birthday celebration in Hyde Park in September 2008.
