= Robert Bonfiglio =

American classical harmonica player

Robert Bonfiglio (born September 6, 1950) is an American classical harmonica player. Described by the music critic for the Los Angeles Times, as "the Paganini of the harmonica", he is known for his many recordings and live performances featuring the instrument.

== Early life and education ==
Bonfiglio was born in Milwaukee, Wisconsin, the son an orthopedic surgeon, and raised in Iowa City, Iowa. He first began playing the diatonic harmonica when he was thirteen, and although he played in local blues bands as a teenager, had no plans to become a professional musician. He enrolled in the University of Arizona to study chemistry, but at the same time became interested in the possibilities of the chromatic harmonica. After travelling to Trossingen, Germany, in the 1970s where he attended a seminar by the master harmonica player, Cham-Ber Huang, he decided on a musical career. He enrolled in Mannes College of Music in New York City, studying composition. Mannes, like the other major music conservatories in the United States at the time, did not offer majors in the harmonica. However, Bonfiglio also studied the classical harmonica with Cham-Ber Huang for five years and was coached privately by Andrew Loyla, the Principal Flautist with the New York City Ballet orchestra for over ten years. During this time he added all the existing classical music composed for the harmonica to his repertoire. After receiving his Bachelor of Music from Mannes, Bonfiglio went to post-graduate study at the Manhattan School of Music. It was his composition teacher there, Charles Wuorinen, who told him he could do more with the classical harmonica than with composition because it was such a special niche.

== Career ==
After graduating from the Manhattan School of Music with his Masters in Music, Bonfiglio supported himself as a session musician in New York working on commercials and soundtracks for television programs and films, including the soundtracks for Kramer vs. Kramer and Places in the Heart. His breakthrough as a concert artist came in 1986 when he performed the world premiere of Henry Cowell's Harmonica Concerto with the Brooklyn Philharmonic Symphony Orchestra conducted by Lukas Foss. BONFIGLIO has been a concerto soloist with Orchestras including the Minnesota Orchestra, Orchestre de la Suisse Romande, the Orchestra of the Teatro Colón in Buenos Aires, the Luxembourg Philharmonic, the Leipzig M D R-Radio Symphony, the Hong Kong Philharmonic, Orchestre National du Capitole de Toulouse, the Madrid Radio Television Española Orchestra, Real Orquesta Sinfónica de Sevilla, the Estonia National Symphony, Edmonton Symphony, the Mexico City Philharmonic, as well as the Milwaukee Symphony, the Indianapolis Symphony, Louisville Orchestra, Oregon Symphony, Utah Symphony and the Los Angeles Philharmonic.

== Personal life ==
Bonfiglio is married to the flautist Clare Hoffman. The couple founded the Grand Canyon Music Festival in 1984 and continue to serve as its artistic directors.

== Discography ==
Bonfiglio's recordings include:

- Villa-Lobos: Harmonica Concerto, Bachianas Brasileiras, with the New York Chamber Symphony, RCA Victor, 1989
- Through the Raindrops, High Harmony Records, 1992
- Live at the Grand Canyon, High Harmony Records, 1994. Recorded at the Grand Canyon Music Festival in September 1993 and September 1994.
