= The Three Monarchs =

British comedy musical group

- Also known as: The Monarchs
- Genre: Comedy harmonicists
- Years active: 1946–1981
- Past members: Eric Yorke; Les Henry; Jimmy Prescott; Johnny Crowe; David Conway; Robin Wilson

The Three Monarchs were a British comedy musical group of harmonica players, active between 1946 and 1981.

== History ==
The Monarchs were formed in 1946 by Eric Yorke (1919–1997), who recruited Les Henry (born Henry Leslie, and known on stage as "Cedric"; 1920–2007), along with Jimmy Prescott and Johnny Crowe. Eric Yorke had begun performing in his teens, and in 1936 featured as "The Harmonica Kid" on Carroll Levis' talent shows, on radio and on tour. Les Henry won solo harmonica championships and had his own award-winning harmonica group before touring in the Second World War with ENSA. He turned down an offer from Harry Secombe and Spike Milligan to help form their new comedy group – who became The Goons – in order to join Eric Yorke, who had formed The Monarchs at the end of the war.

Crowe soon left, and the group became the Three Monarchs. The group first came to public notice on the BBC radio programme The Forces Show, and became popular when Henry, as "Cedric", who had a notably high-pitched voice, developed the comedy side of the act. They worked extensively at the London Palladium, and toured nationally and internationally, including visits to South Africa and Las Vegas. Prescott was replaced by David Conway in 1957. In the 1960s, the group featured regularly on The Black and White Minstrel Show on British television.

Robin Wilson joined the group in the 1960s when David Conway left to form a double act with his wife. Eric Yorke retired in 1981, and the group split up. Les Henry continued to perform, as Cedric Monarch, into the 1990s and beyond, and also took acting roles.
