= Villingen (Schwarzwald) station =

Railway station in Baden-Württemberg, Germany

Villingen (Schwarzw)
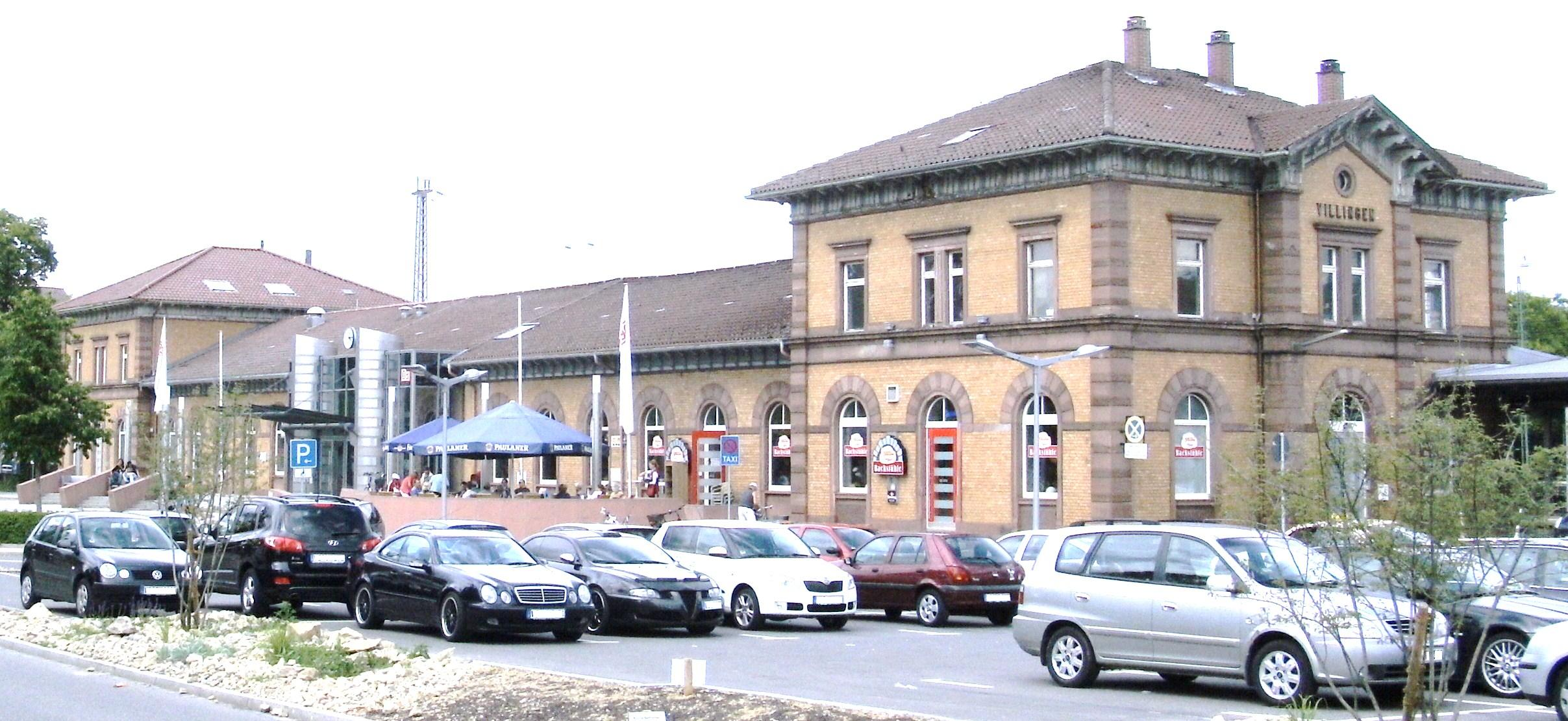
- Villingen station building

General information
- Location: Bahnhofstr. 5, Villingen-Schwenningen, Baden-Württemberg; Germany
- Coordinates: 48°03′28″N 8°27′54″E
- Elevation: 704 m (2,310 ft)
- Owner: DB Netz
- Operator: DB Station&Service
- Lines: Rottweil–Villingen (km 26.787); Offenburg–Singen (km 85.9)
- Platforms: 5 (3 in regular use)

Construction
- Accessible: Yes

Other information
- Station code: 6418
- DS100 code: RVL
- IBNR: 8000366
- Category: 4
- Fare zone: Move: 4
- Website: www.bahnhof.de

History
- Opened: 6 July 1869 (first train)

Services
| Preceding station | DB Regio Baden-Württemberg | Following station |
|---|---|---|
| St. Georgen towards Karlsruhe Hbf | RE 2 | Donaueschingen towards Konstanz |
| Terminus | RE 55 | Donaueschingen towards Ulm Hbf |
| Preceding station | (Offenburg) | Following station |
| Reverses direction | RB 42 | Marbach Ost towards Bräunlingen |
| Reverses direction | RB 42 | Marbach West towards Rottweil |
| Preceding station | Breisgau S-Bahn | Following station |
| Donaueschingen towards Freiburg Hbf | S10 | Terminus |
Location

Villingen (Schwarzwald) station (officially called Villingen (Schwarzw) by Deutsche Bahn) is one of two stations in Villingen-Schwenningen in the German state of Baden-Württemberg. The other is Schwenningen (Neckar). In addition, there are five more halts (Haltepunkte). The station is located east of the old town of Villingen beyond the Brigach. It is located at 704 metres above sea level on the Black Forest Railway and it is the terminus of the Rottweil–Villingen railway.

== History ==
The building was built before 1869. The station was owned by the Grand Duchy of Baden State Railway (Großherzoglich Badische Staatseisenbahnen). Since, however, it was the terminus of the Rottweil–Villingen railway of the Royal Württemberg State Railways (Königlich Württembergischen Staats-Eisenbahnen), a locomotive shed and residential building for railway staff were operated by the Württemberg Railways in Villingen in Baden. The two railways shared a goods shed.

The central block of the present-day entrance building has been renovated several times, most recently on the occasion of the 1000th anniversary of Villingen in 1999.

The Black Forest Railway was electrified in 1972. The section from Offenburg to Villingen was electrified on 28 September 1975 and the line from Villingen to Constance in 1977. The electrification of the line to Villingen brought the amount of electrified railway in the West Germany to 10,000 km, which is marked by a memorial plaque at the station.

The station was upgraded to make it fully accessible ib 2020 and 2021. For this purpose two lifts were installed and the platforms were raised to allow the level boarding of trains. The cost was €15.8 million and the city contributed €1.2m, the state €0.5m and the rest was funded by Deutsche Bahn.

== Rail services ==
There are direct connections to, among other places, Ulm, Konstanz, Karlsruhe and Neustadt im Schwarzwald.

=== Long distance ===
Villingen (Schwarzw) station is served by a pair of InterCity services operated by Deutsche Bahn, called the Bodensee ("Lake Constance"), running between Emden and Konstanz. Frequently the station is used in the summer months to reach the tourist regions of the Black Forest and Constance. The pair of IC services called Schwarzwald ("Black Forest") from Hamburg to Constance was discontinued in December 2014 due to low patronage.

| Line | Route | Frequency |
|---|---|---|
| IC 35 | Norddeich Mole – Emden Hbf – Münster (Westf) Hbf – Duisburg – Cologne – Bonn – Koblenz – Mannheim – Karlsruhe – Offenburg – Villingen (Schwarzw) – Singen (Hohentwiel) – Konstanz | Some train pairs on weekends |

=== Regional services ===
| Line | Route | Frequency |
|---|---|---|
| RE 2 | Karlsruhe – Baden-Baden – Achern – Offenburg – Villingen (Schwarzw) – Donaueschingen – Singen (Hohentwiel) – Konstanz | 60 min |
| RE 55 | (Triberg –) Villingen (Schwarzw) – Donaueschingen – Tuttlingen – Sigmaringen – Riedlingen – Schelklingen – Ulm Hbf | 1 train daily |
| RB 42 | Bräunlingen – Donaueschingen – Villingen (Schwarzw) – Schwenningen (Neckar) – Trossingen Bahnhof – Rottweil – Spaichingen – Tuttlingen – Immendingen – Blumberg-Zollhaus | 60 min |
| S10 | Villingen (Schwarzw) - Donaueschingen - Neustadt (Schwarzw) - Titisee - Freiburg | 60 min |

== See also ==
- Rail transport in Germany
- Railway stations in Germany
