= Larry Adler =

American harmonica player (1914–2001)

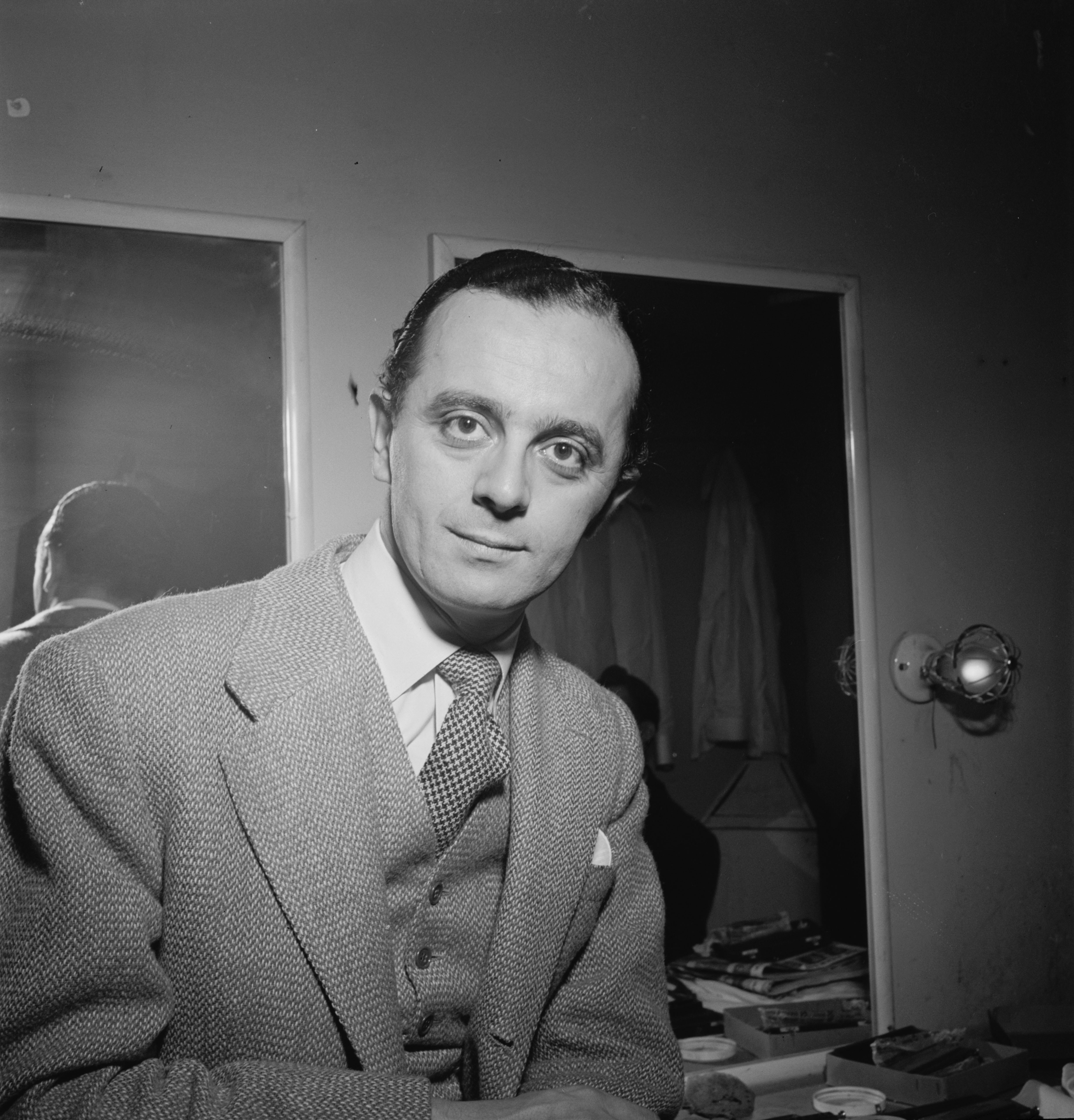
- A photo of Adler in City Center in New York City in January 1947 by William Gottlieb
- Born: Lawrence Cecil Adler; February 10, 1914; Baltimore, Maryland, United States
- Died: August 6, 2001 (aged 87); London, England
- Occupations: Composer, actor, musician
- Years active: 1931–2001
- Spouses: Eileen Walser (m. 1938; div. 1961); Sally Cline (m. 1969; div. 1977)
- Children: 4
- Relatives: Jerry Adler (brother)

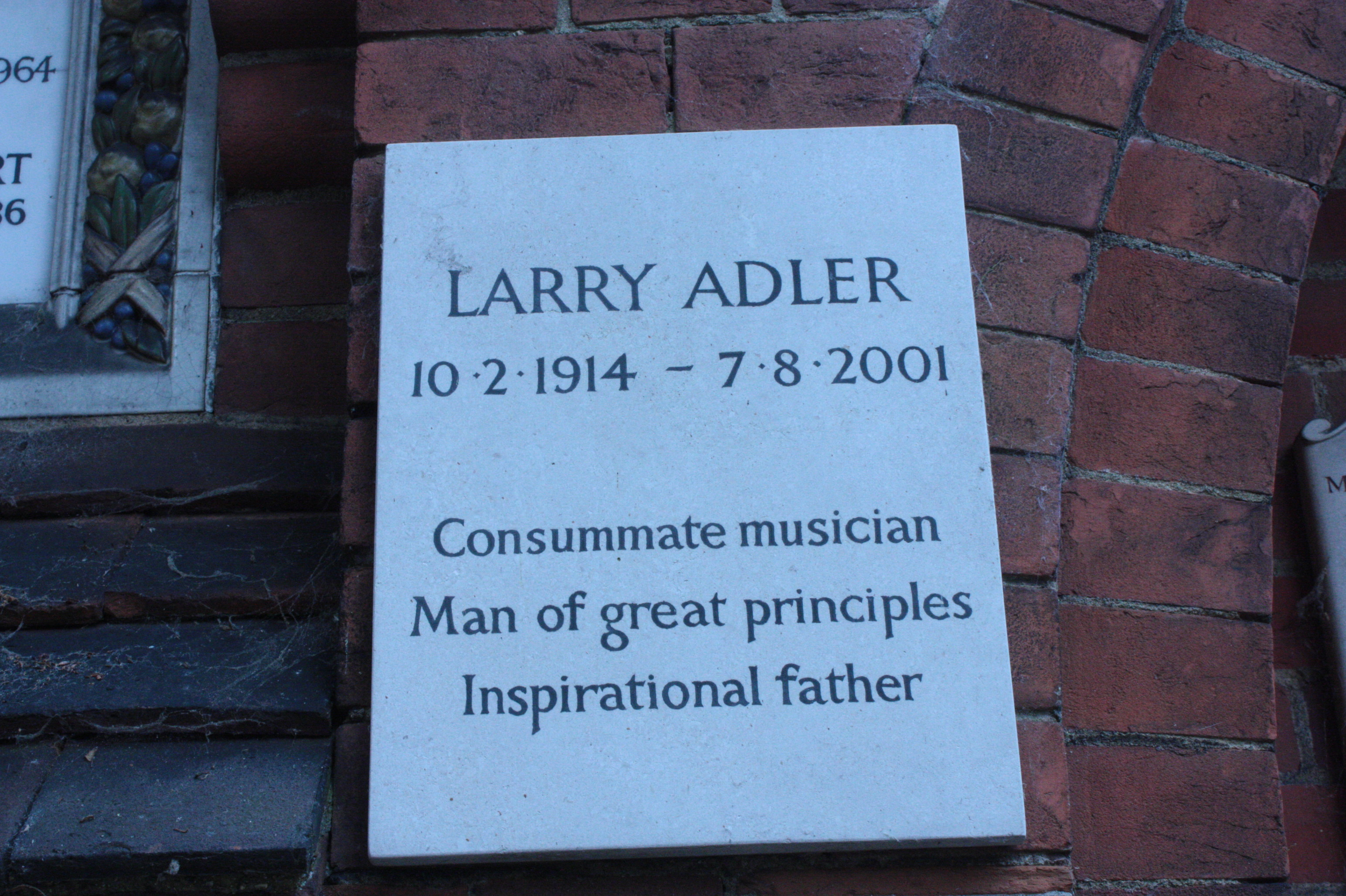
Memorial tablet to Larry Adler, Golders Green Crematorium

Lawrence Cecil Adler (February 10, 1914 – August 6, 2001) was an American harmonica player and film composer. Known for playing major works, he played compositions by George Gershwin, Ralph Vaughan Williams, Malcolm Arnold, Darius Milhaud and Arthur Benjamin. During his later career, he collaborated with Sting, Elton John and Kate Bush.

== Early life ==
Adler was born in Baltimore, Maryland, to Sadie Hack and Louis Adler. They were a Jewish family. He graduated from Baltimore City College high school. He taught himself harmonica, which he called a mouth organ. He played professionally at 14. In 1927, he won a contest sponsored by the Baltimore Sun, playing a Beethoven minuet, and a year later he ran away from home to New York. After being referred by Rudy Vallée, Adler got his first theatre work, and caught the attention of orchestra leader Paul Ash, who placed Adler in a vaudeville act as "a ragged urchin, playing for pennies".

== Career ==
From there, he was hired by Florenz Ziegfeld and then by Lew Leslie again as an urchin. He broke the typecasting and appeared in a dinner jacket in the 1934 Paramount film Many Happy Returns, and was hired by theatrical producer C. B. Cochran to perform in London. That same year, he played Rhapsody in Blue for Gershwin who exclaimed "the Goddam thing sounds as if I wrote it for you!" He became a star in the United Kingdom and the Empire, where, it has been written, harmonica sales increased 20-fold and 300,000 people joined fan clubs.

Adler was one of the first harmonica players to perform major works written for the instrument, often written for him: these include Jean Berger's Concerto for Harmonica and Orchestra "Caribbean" (1941), Cyril Scott's Serenade (harmonica and piano, 1936), Vaughan Williams' Romance in D flat for harmonica, piano and string orchestra; premiered New York, 1952, Milhaud's Suite Anglaise (Paris, May 28, 1947), Arthur Benjamin's Harmonica Concerto (1953), Malcolm Arnold's Harmonica Concerto, Op. 46 (1954, written for The Proms) and Naresh Sohal's Concerto for harmonica, percussion and strings (1966). He recorded all except the Scott Serenade and the Sohal, some more than once. Earlier, Adler had performed transcriptions of pieces for other instruments, such as violin concertos by Bach and Vivaldi – he played his arrangement of Vivaldi's Violin Concerto in A minor with the Sydney Symphony. Other works he played in harmonica arrangements were by Bartók, Beethoven (Minuet in G), Debussy, Falla, Gershwin (Rhapsody in Blue), Mozart (slow movement from the Oboe Quartet, K. 470), Poulenc, Ravel (Boléro), Stravinsky and Walton.

During the 1940s, Adler and the dancer Paul Draper formed an act and toured nationally and internationally, performing individually then together in each performance. One popular number was Gershwin's "I Got Rhythm". During the McCarthy era he was accused of being a communist and refused to cooperate with the House Un-American Activities Committee (HUAC). After being blacklisted and an unsuccessful libel suit decided in 1950, he moved to the United Kingdom in 1951 and settled in London, where he remained for the rest of his life. Another source indicates he stayed in London from 1949.

The 1953 film Genevieve brought him an Oscar nomination for his work on the soundtrack, and considerable wealth. His name was originally removed from the credits in the United States due to blacklisting. His other film scores included A Cry from the Streets (1958), The Hellions (1961), The Hook (1963), King & Country (1964) and A High Wind in Jamaica (1965). He also scored a hit with the theme song of the French Jacques Becker movie Touchez pas au grisbi with Jean Gabin, written by Jean Wiener.

In 1959, a reviewer from the Village Voice called Adler "a great artist" after watching his twice-nightly performances at the Village Gate.

In 1964, in an interview, asked what he thought of the Beatles, he said that "Lennon and McCartney have little musical talent". In 1994, for his 80th birthday, Adler and George Martin produced an album of George Gershwin songs, The Glory of Gershwin, on which they performed "Rhapsody in Blue". The Glory of Gershwin reached number 2 in the UK albums chart in 1994. Adler was a musician and showman. Concerts to support The Glory of Gershwin showed he was a competent pianist. He opened each performance with Gershwin's "Summertime", playing piano and harmonica simultaneously. The album included Peter Gabriel, Oleta Adams, Elton John, Sting, Jon Bon Jovi and Richie Sambora, Meat Loaf, Sinéad O'Connor, Robert Palmer, Cher, Kate Bush, Elvis Costello, Courtney Pine, Issy Van Randwyck, Lisa Stansfield and Carly Simon, all of whom sang Gershwin tunes with an orchestra and Adler adding harmonica solos.

Adler made a total of four appearances at the BBC Proms: in 1952, 1953 and 1954 at the Royal Albert Hall and at the Proms in the Park concert in Hyde Park on 13 September 1997 as part of the Last Night of the Proms.

== Acting, writing and wartime radio ==
Adler appeared in five movies, including Sidewalks of London (1938), in which he played a harmonica virtuoso named Constantine. His other film appearances were in Three Daring Daughters (1948) playing himself; Music for Millions (1944) playing Larry; The Singing Marine (1937) playing Larry; and The Big Broadcast of 1937 (1936). He was a prolific letter writer, his correspondence with Private Eye becoming popular in the United Kingdom.

Adler wrote an autobiography entitled It Ain't Necessarily So in 1985, and was food critic for Harpers & Queen. He appeared on the Jack Benny radio program several times, entertaining disabled soldiers in the US during World War II. A further biography, Me and My Big Mouth appeared in 1994 but he told The Free-Reed Journal: "That's a lousy book and I don't like it; it's ghosted. ... [It] has a certain amount of factual material but the author completely missed my style and my voice. That's why I hate the book."

== Personal life ==
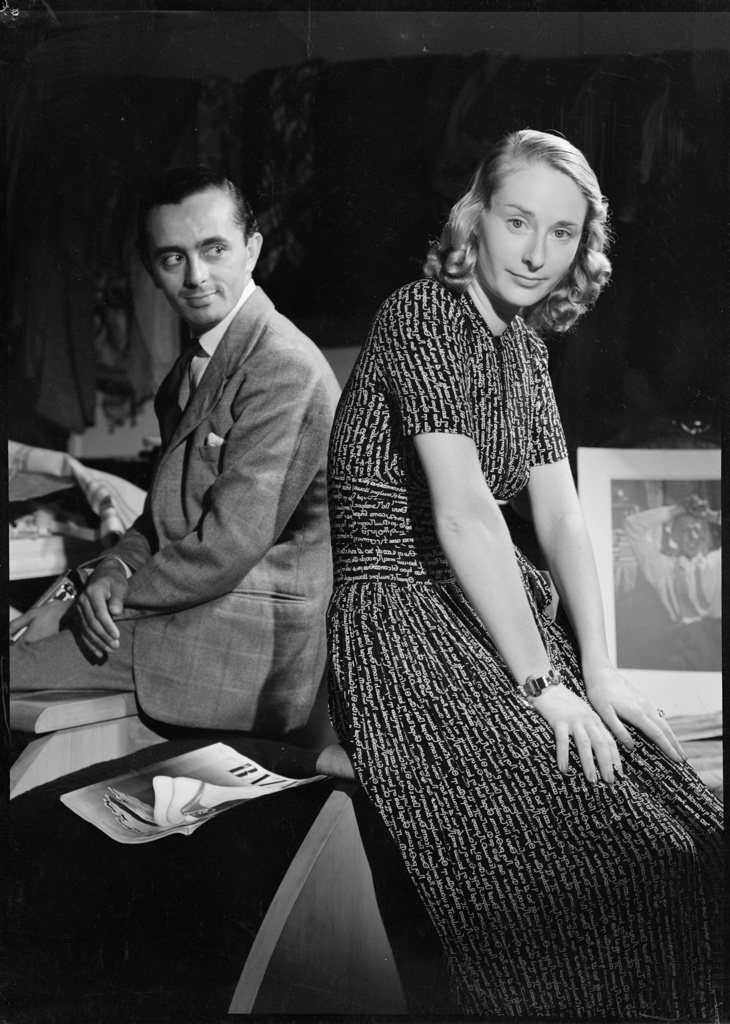
Larry Adler and Eileen Walser (attrib.), Sydney, c. 1938

Adler married Eileen Walser in 1938; they had two daughters and one son. They divorced in 1961. He married Sally Cline in 1969; they had one daughter. They divorced in 1977. At the time of his death, in addition to his children he also had two grandchildren and two great-grandchildren.

His son, Peter Adler, fronted the band Action and others in Dublin, Ireland, in the late 1960s. Adler was an atheist. His brother, Jerry Adler (1918–2010), was also a harmonica player.

Adler was a close friend of Peter Stringfellow, who hosted his birthday parties at his central London club for at least the last ten years of his life.

He was an outspoken critic of Ronald Reagan, primarily because of Reagan's anti-communist activities when president of the Screen Actors Guild in the 1940s and 1950s.

He died of cancer in St Thomas' Hospital, London, aged 87, on 6 August 2001. He was cremated at Golders Green Crematorium, London, where his ashes remain.
