= Trossingen =

- Town
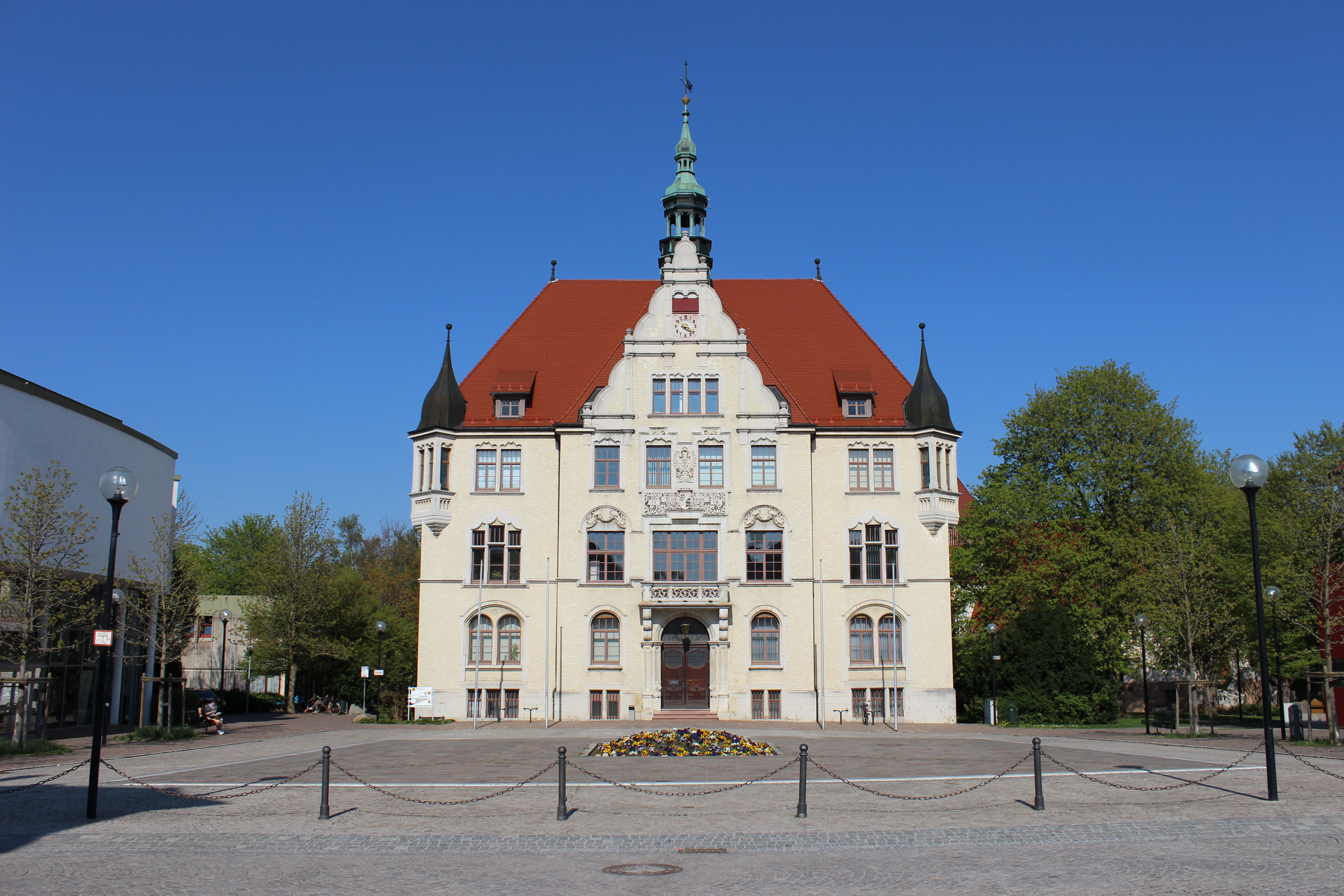
- The town hall of Trossingen

- Flag Coat of arms

- Location of Trossingen within Tuttlingen district
- Interactive map of Trossingen
- Location within Germany Location within Baden-Württemberg
- Coordinates: 48°04′32″N 08°38′10″E
- Country: Germany
- State: Baden-Württemberg
- Admin. region: Freiburg
- District: Tuttlingen

Government
  - Mayor (2020–28): Susanne Irion (CDU)

Area
  - Total: 24.2 km^{2} (9.3 sq mi)
- Elevation: 699 m (2,293 ft)

Population (2025-12-31)
  - Total: 17,538
  - Density: 725/km^{2} (1,880/sq mi)
- Time zone: UTC+01:00 (CET)
  - Summer (DST): UTC+02:00 (CEST)
- Postal codes: 78647
- Dialling codes: 07425
- Vehicle registration: TUT
- Website: www.trossingen.de

Trossingen (German pronunciation: [ˈtʁɔsɪŋən]; Swabian: Drossinge) is a town in Baden-Württemberg, Germany. It is situated in a region called Baar, between the Swabian Alb and the Black Forest. Stuttgart is about an hour away, Lake Constance about half an hour, and the source of the river Danube can be reached in about twenty minutes by car. Trossingen is renowned as a "music town". Although it has only nearly 17,000 inhabitants as of December 31, 2018, the town is home to the renowned 'University of Music Trossingen' (with its famous Early Music department), which is one of Baden-Württemberg's five state conservatories, and there are several other institutions specializing in musical education, like the 'Bundesakademie für musikalische Jugendbildung' and the 'Hohner Konservatorium' .

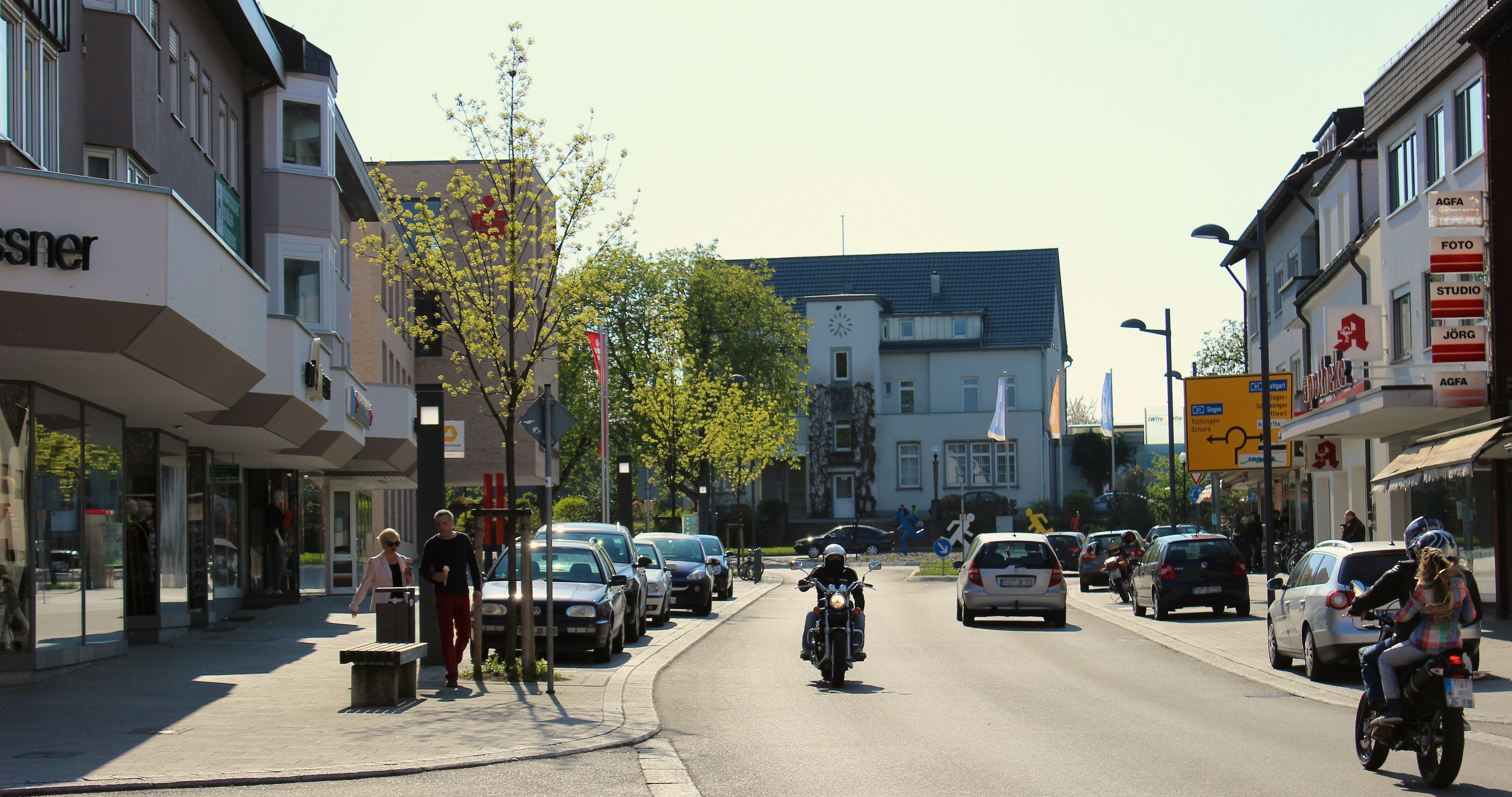
View from the main street to the train station

In 1830 Christian Messner from Trossingen, a cloth maker and weaver, copied a harmonica brought to Trossingen by his next door neighbor, a clockmaker from Vienna. This was the beginning of musical instrument production in the town. Messner was so successful at making such instruments that eventually his brother and some relatives also started making harmonicas. From 1840 on his nephew Christian Weiss started working on his own, so by 1855 there were two registered businesses - Christian Messner & Co. and Württ. Harmonikafabrik Ch. Weiss. Trossingen is not the home of the world's oldest existent harmonica manufacturer, C.A. Seydel Sohne, founded in 1847, which is based in the town of Klingenthal/Sachsen.

In 1857 the Matthias Hohner company was founded. Today, Hohner harmonicas and accordions are well known all over the world. Trossingen also houses the German Harmonica Museum.

Trossingen has a historic railway: the Trossinger Eisenbahn.

At the edge of town, in a former clay quarry, were found several dozen skeletons, both complete and partial, of the prosauropod dinosaur Plateosaurus engelhardti during excavations in the early 20th century. The local museum Auberlehaus houses several original bones.

== International relations ==
Trossingen is twinned with:

- Cluses, France
- Beaverton, Oregon, United States
- Windhoek, Namibia
