= Schwenningen (Neckar) station =

Railway station in Villingen-Schwenningen, Germany

Schwenningen (Neckar)
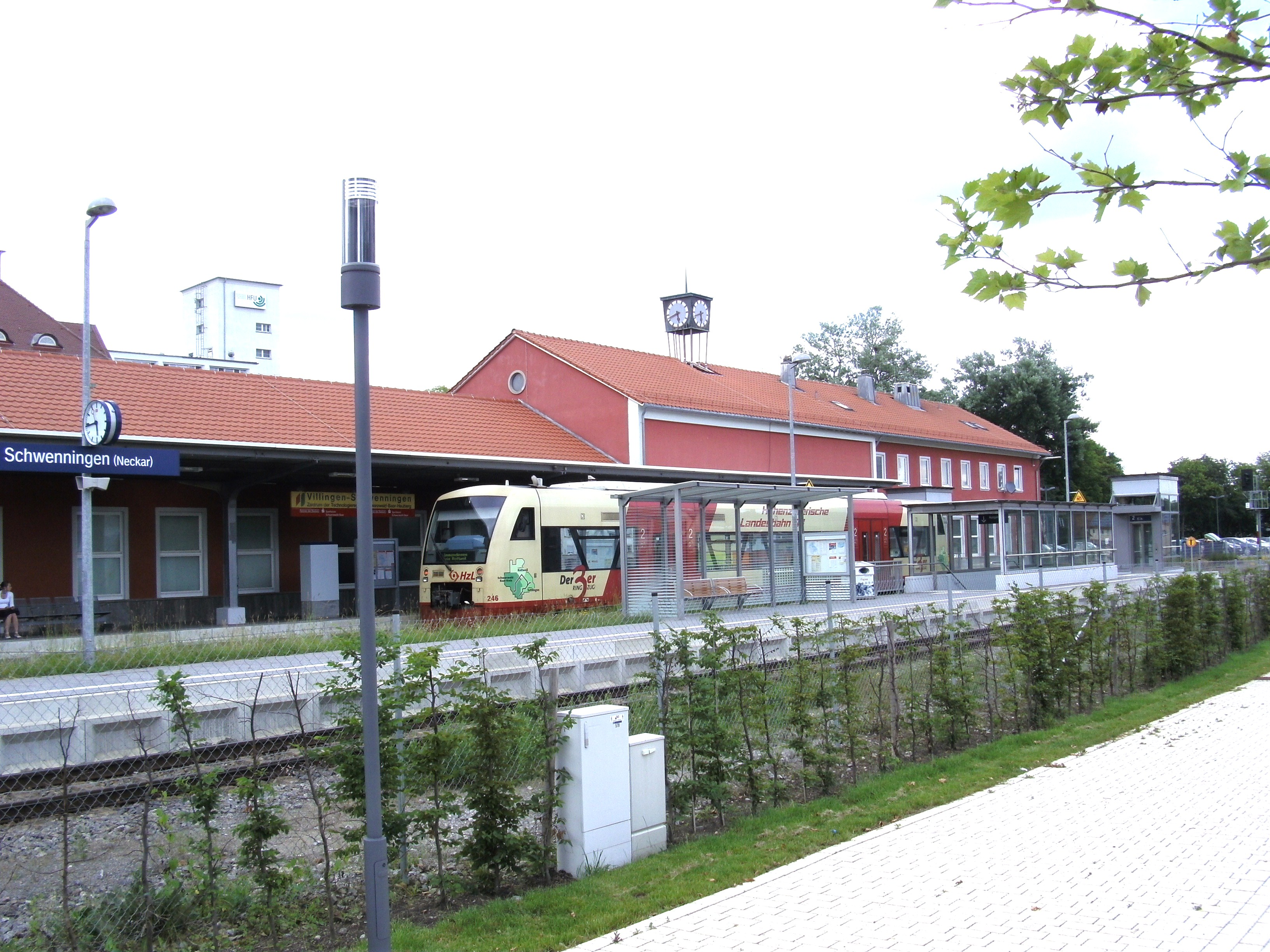
- Ringzug train in Schwenningen station

General information
- Location: Erzberger Str. 20, Villingen-Schwenningen, Baden-Württemberg; Germany
- Coordinates: 48°03′36″N 8°32′08″E
- Line: Rottweil–Villingen
- Platforms: 2

Construction
- Accessible: Yes

Other information
- Station code: 5752
- DS100 code: RSCV
- IBNR: 8005490
- Category: 6
- Fare zone: Move: 4
- Website: www.bahnhof.de

History
- Opened: 1869

Services
Preceding station	(Offenburg)	Following station
Hammerstatt towards Rottweil	RB 42	Eisstadion towards Bräunlingen
Location

Schwenningen (Neckar) station is one of two stations in Villingen-Schwenningen in the German state of Baden-Württemberg. The other is Villingen (Schwarzwald). Schwenningen owes its connection to the railway to Johannes Bürk, who had demanded a route through Schwenningen to promote the local watch industry, which included his own factory. The original plans involved a route through Niedereschach. The station is located at the Neckar, south of central Schwenningen. It is located at 695 metres (2,280 feet) above sea level on the Rottweil–Villingen railway. Originally the station was 540 metres (1,770 feet) long and up to 56 metres (184 feet) wide. The complex included a station building and a goods shed.

The station promoted the economic boom of Schwenningen as an industrial city. The watch industry attracted workers from far away, some from the Stuttgart area. That explains why 436,410 passengers were counted in 1907, as Schwenningen had developed from the village into a city by that time.

== History ==
The station building was completed in 1872.

As a result of the industrial importance of Schwenningen, the station was repeatedly targeted by Allied air raids during World War II.

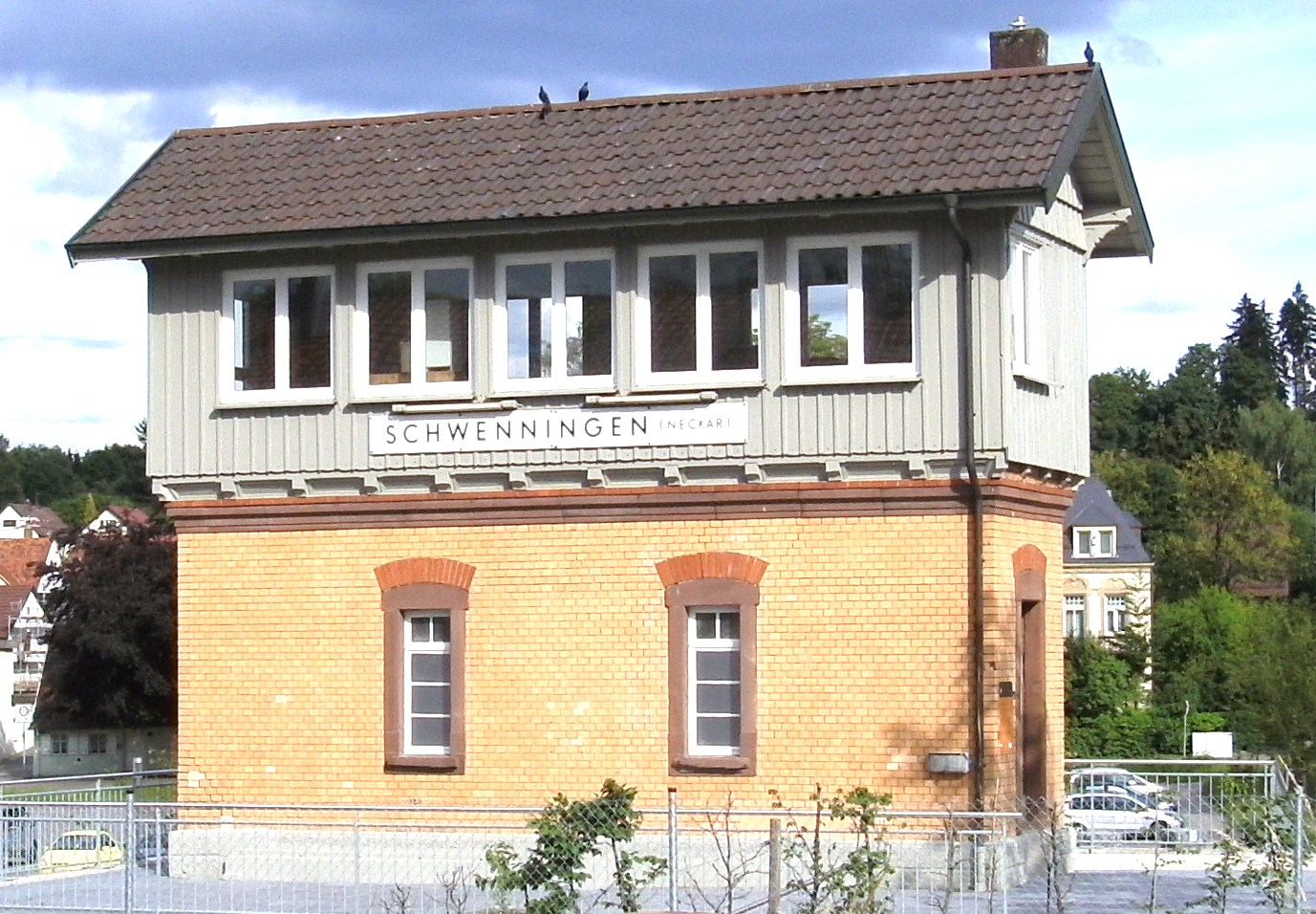
Historical signal box of 1869

A goods yard was once located on the opposite side of the tracks, but west of the entrance buildings. After the remediation of the area and the defusing of the last known unexploded ordnance, the venue was used for the Villingen-Schwenningen state garden show (Landesgartenschau) in 2010.

The station includes a historic signal box, which was built in 1869. This allowed the route to be set by means of mechanical levers. It is located opposite the entrance building near the Neckar. The building is no longer used for railway operations, but is heritage-listed. During the garden show, the pedestrian underpass that once connected the entrance building with Neckarstraße was shortened. It now extends only to the rear of the second platform and the signal box, which was secured with a new base.

== Regional services ==
RB 42	Bräunlingen – Donaueschingen – Villingen (Schwarzwald) – Schwenningen (Neckar) – Trossingen – Rottweil – Spaichingen – Tuttlingen – Immendingen – Blumberg-Zollhaus	60 min
