= Ringzug =

German railway network

Logo of the 3er-Ringzug

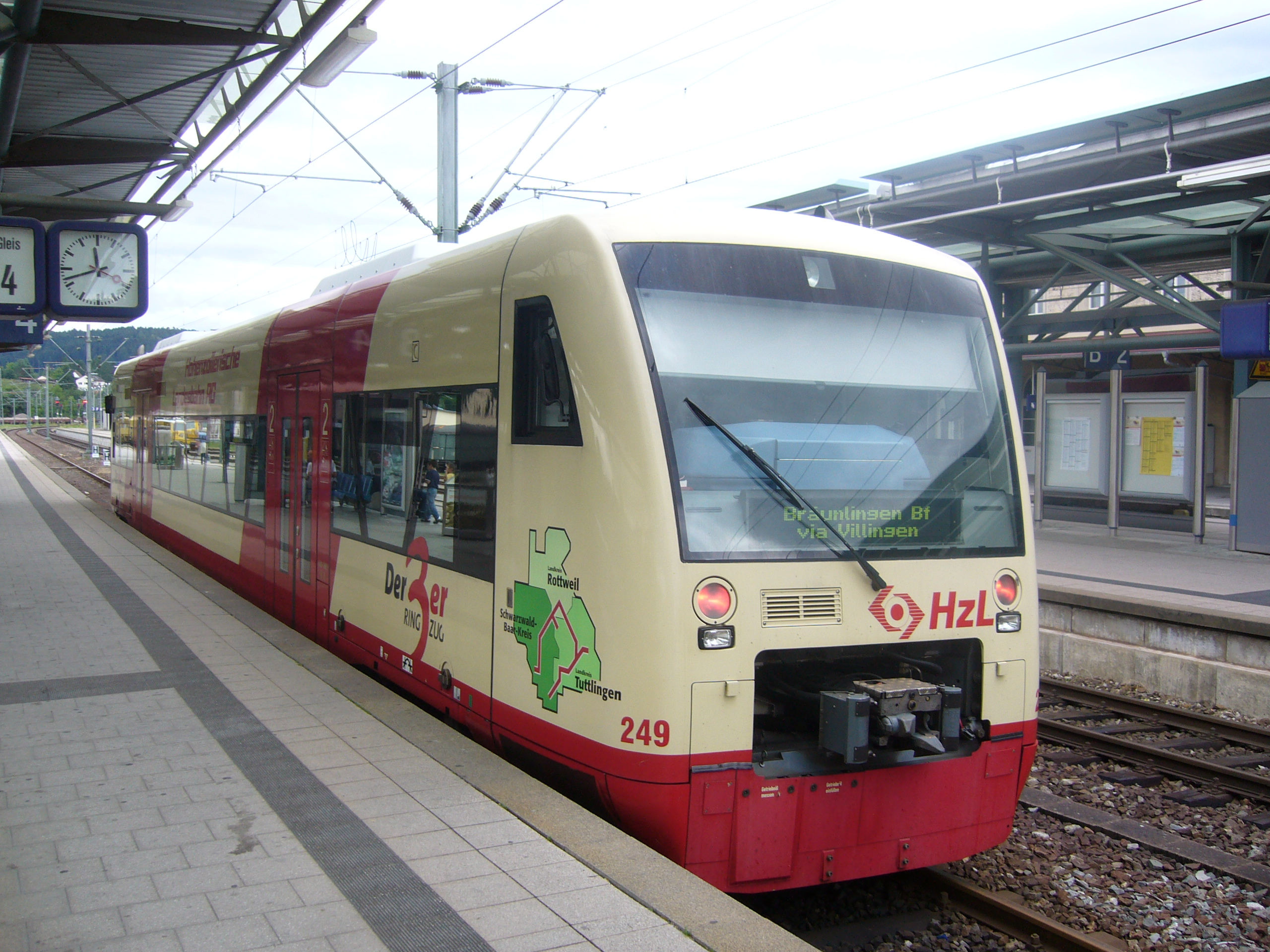
A Ringzug railcar in Rottweil

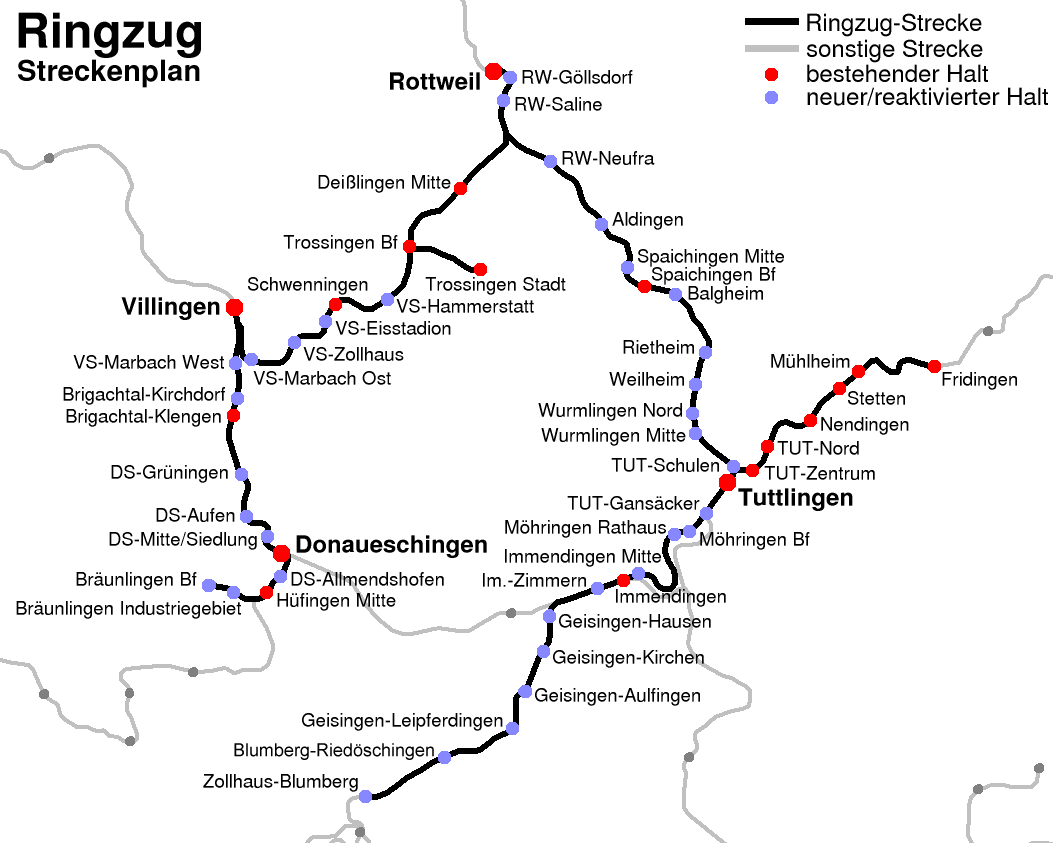
Line map of the Ringzug

The Ringzug ("ring train"), also called the 3er-Ringzug ("ring train of the 3") is a passenger transport network in the districts of Tuttlingen, Rottweil and Schwarzwald-Baar in southern Baden-Württemberg, Germany. The Ringzug went into regular operations on 31 August 2003 and has operated in its current form since 12 December 2004. The concept of the Ringzug is the operation of a clockface timetable, coordinated with a variety of other buses and train services, over an S-Bahn-like network in a rural environment. In March 2006, the passenger association Pro Bahn described the Ringzug as an exemplary public transport system at its 2006-passenger transport awards (Fahrgastpreis 2006). The Ringzug has aroused interest beyond the region and can point to steadily rising passenger numbers and declining deficits.

== Name ==
The term Ringzug was chosen because its route was originally intended to form a ring, but it is interrupted by the gap between Immendingen and Donaueschingen. The network also includes lines that are not part of the ring. These include the Trossingen Railway and parts of the Breg Valley Railway, the Wutach Valley Railway and the Tuttlingen–Inzigkofen railway. The alternative term 3er-Ringzug indicates that three districts participate in the project.

== History ==
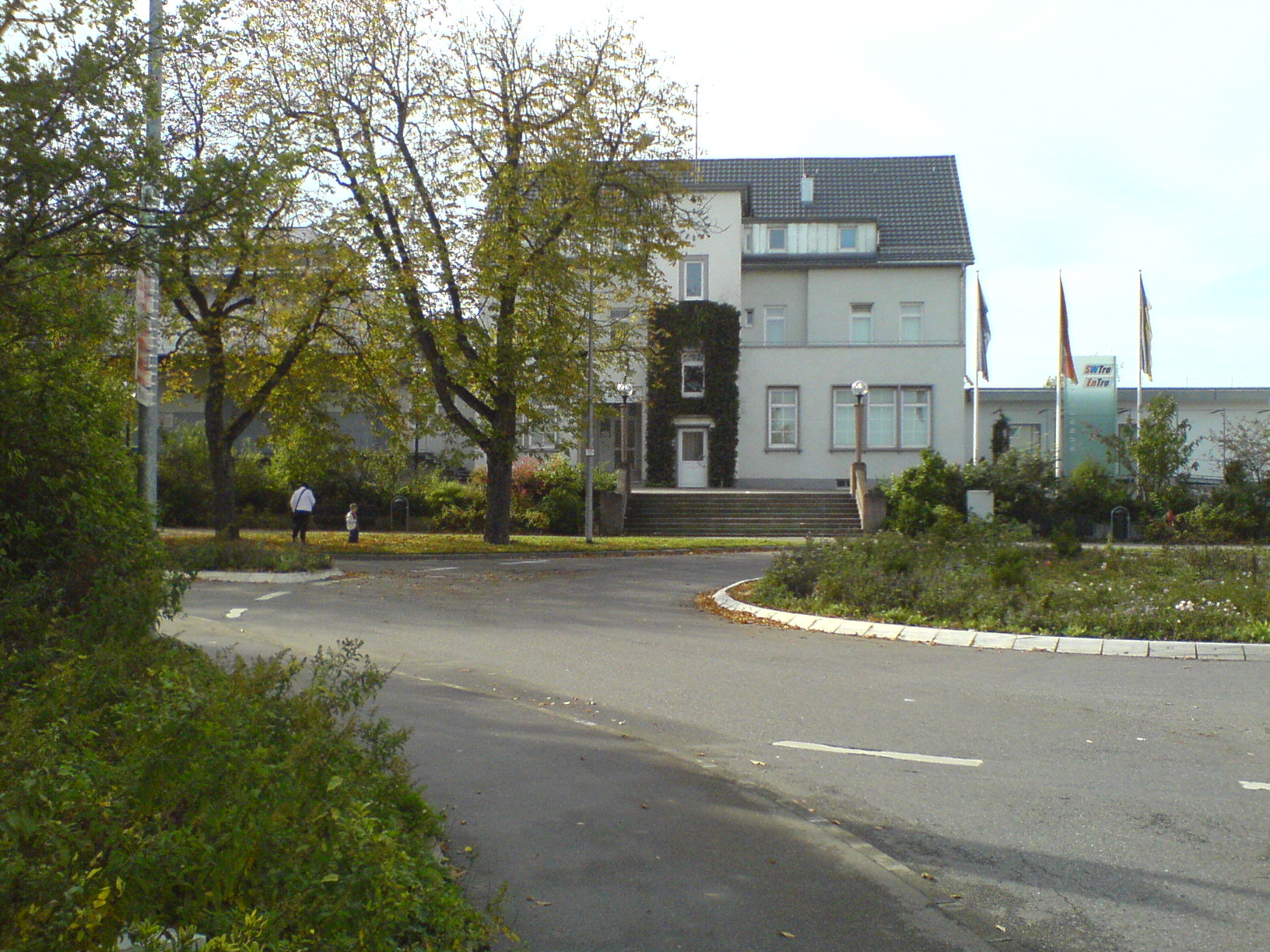
In the mid-1990s the Trossingen Stadt station of the Trossingen Railway was in danger of being closed

The majority of stations in the Ringzug area were skipped in the 1970s and 1980s due to the implementation of Deutsche Bundesbahn's so-called eilzugmäßigen (semi-fast running) of regional services. On the 28 kilometre-long section of the Plochingen–Immendingen railway (part of the Gäubahn) between Tuttlingen and Rottweil, Spaichingen was the only remaining stop. No train stopped even in Aldingen, which had 7,500 residents.

Passenger services on the Marbach–Bad Dürrheim railway were abandoned in 1953, the abandonment of passenger services on the Heuberg Railway followed in 1966 and the northern section of the Wutach Valley Railway from Lauchringen to Zollhaus-Blumberg had no scheduled passenger traffic from 1967. After 1972, this was also true for the Breg Valley Railway. Even the Trossingen Railway would have been completely shut down if a decision taken by the Trossingen council in 1996 had been implemented.

In the area of Upper Danube Nature Park between Tuttlingen and Fridingen, the "Danube Valley" model was launched in September 1990 by the district of Tuttlingen to reverse some of the displacement of school transport from rail. Otherwise, public transport in the region was largely focused on school bus services.

As a result of this withdrawal of services from the area, the Schwarzwald-Baar-Heuberg area had no regional connections, except on long-distance services. On the Black Forest Railway, in addition to the express trains, an InterRegio service ran at two-hour intervals between Hamburg and Konstanz. On the Plochingen–Immendingen railway, express trains (Durchgangszug or later EuroCity services) ran from Stuttgart via Zurich to Italy. There were also long-distance passenger trains on the Ulm–Tuttlingen-Donaueschingen–Neustadt (Schwarzw) and the Rottweil–Villingen–Donaueschingen–Neustadt (Schwarzw) routes.

=== Political decisions on the way to the establishment of Ringzug 1995–2001 ===
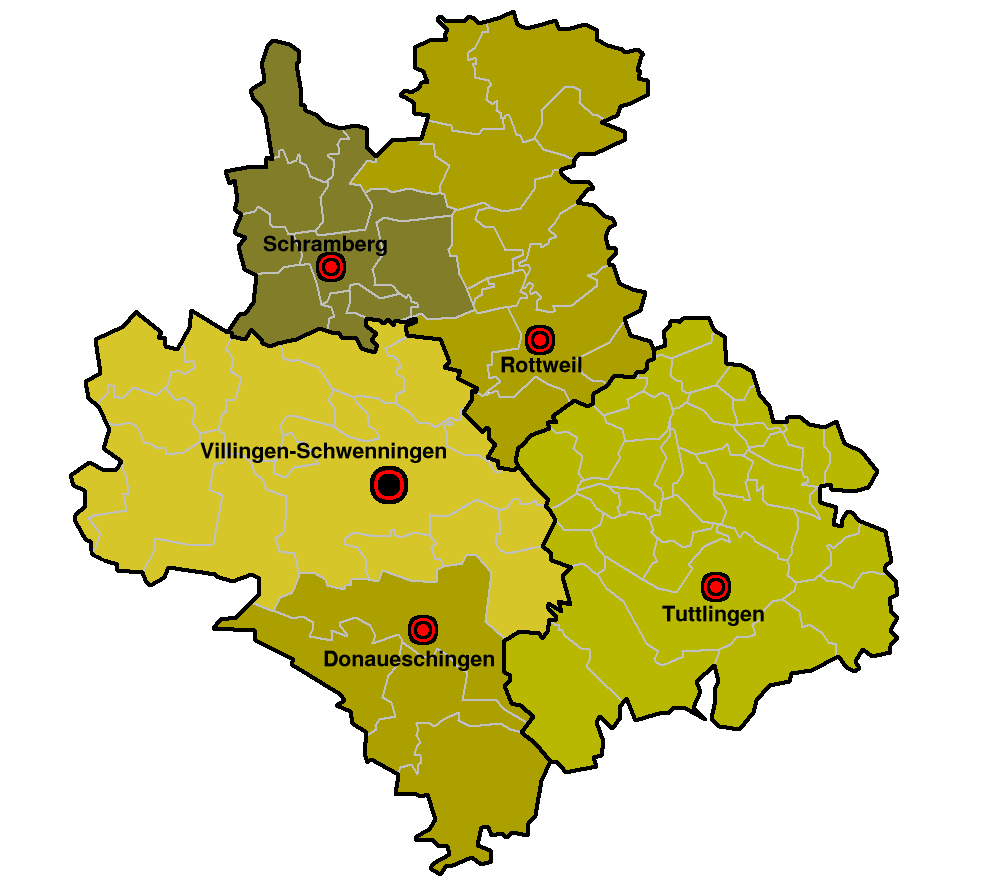
The Region Schwarzwald-Baar-Heuberg

Logo of the Hohenzollerischen Landesbahn

In January 1995, the regional association of Schwarzwald-Baar-Heuberg was presented by the Tübingen transport consultant Gerd Hickmann with an elaborate study of an integrated timetable for buses and trains in the Schwarzwald-Baar-Heuberg region. This suggested an integrated regular-interval timetable be introduced in the region to connect rail and bus services. The backbone of this new transport concept would be a Ringzug. Following Hickmann's study his colleague Ulrich Grosse supervised the development of the concept and advised the political authorities to implement it. In January 1996. the district councils of Tuttlingen, Rottweil and the Schwarzwald-Baar-Kreis decided to implement the developed concept under the so-called "Trossingen agreement" (Trossinger Vereinbarung). The residence of then Premier Erwin Teufel as the region's representative in the parliament of Baden-Württemberg assured the promotion of the new transport system.

After the Trossingen agreement, the three councils developed the concept and approved it in 1999. Then, the state of Baden-Württemberg called for tenders for an operator for the Ringzug network. Among several tenders received, four were from railway companies, including Deutsche Bahn. Finally, the tender of Hohenzollerische Landesbahn was accepted at the end of 1999. Between 1999 and 2001, further planning stopped because a dispute over the distribution of operating costs between the districts had broken out. This dispute was settled in 2001 and in the same year, the financial agreement with the State of Baden-Württemberg was also completed. In December 2001, the special-purpose association (Zweckverband) was established to create the Ringzug, initially under the chairmanship of the former administrator of Tuttlingen District, Hans Volle.

=== Improving transport infrastructure 2001–2003 ===
The partial disuse of lines for decades and the lack of stations required massive investment in transport infrastructure. The signalling technology, which originated in part from the early part of the 20th century, had to be fundamentally overhauled and was eventually replaced by a computerised system. Even electronic interlockings were introduced, which are now remotely controlled from Karlsruhe. Overall the new signalling technology, the stations and the upgrading of the network cost about €67 million. In addition, €33 million was spent on a total of 20 Regio-Shuttle sets that were delivered at the beginning of 2003 and intended for use on the new network. A new depot was built for this in Immendingen.

=== Limited Ringzug operations in 2003/2004 ===
Originally, the Ringzug was scheduled to open on 15 December 2002, but significant delays in the renovation work delayed the start of operations until 31 August 2003. However, since the infrastructure was not yet fully available at that time, only a limited operation was launched. Many of the proposed new stations were not yet completed, so trains could not stop at them for months. Because an electronic interlocking was being installed at the junction to the Wutach Valley Railway branch in Hintschingen, the line also could not be included at first. So the Ringzug was launched with an incomplete route network and a few stations, which meant that in the first year buses still ran parallel to the railway lines.

== Network ==
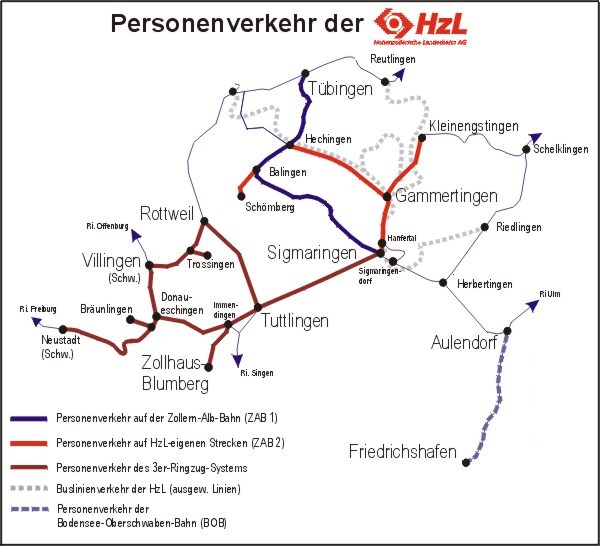
The Ringzug as part of HzL-operated network, which also includes routes outside the main network.

=== Integrated lines ===
The Ringzug network consists of the following seven railways:

- The Breg Valley Railway from Bräunlingen (formerly from Furtwangen) to Donaueschingen over its entire remaining length,
- the Black Forest Railway from Offenburg to Konstanz over the Donaueschingen–Villingen section,
- the Rottweil–Villingen railway over its entire length,
- the Plochingen–Immendingen railway over the Rottweil–Tuttlingen section,
- the Tuttlingen–Inzigkofen railway over the Immendingen–Tuttlingen–Fridingen an der Donau section,
- the Wutach Valley Railway from Immendingen to Waldshut over the Immendingen–Blumberg-Zollhaus section and
- the Trossingen Railway from Trossingen station to Trossingen Stadt over its entire length.

None of the railway lines is part of the main line of the Hohenzollern Landesbahn. For the majority of these services the DB Netz is responsible for the railway Infrastructure, while the Trossingen Railway belongs to Stadtwerke Trossingen (the municipal utility), the Wutach Valley Railway belongs to the town of Blumberg and the Hüfingen-Bräunlingen section was the responsibility of the Südwestdeutsche Verkehrs-Aktiengesellschaft ("Southwest German Transport Company", SWEG). The last two were reactivated for the Ringzug, after decades without regular passenger services. On the three lines that do not belong to DB Netz AG, passenger services are now operated exclusively by Ringzug. On the remaining sections there are additional services operated by Deutsche Bahn.

==== Gap between Donaueschingen and Immendingen ====
There is a gap in the system between Immendingen and Donaueschingen. This was due to the timetabling in the mid-1990s, when the concept was developed. At that time InterRegio services that ran on the Black Forest Railway between Donaueschingen and Immendingen occupied train paths that the Ringzug would have needed. Therefore, the Ringzug has to date refrained from operating over this route. Instead, it was decided to include the Wutach Valley Railway, running through the relatively sparsely populated Immendingen–Zollhaus-Blumberg section, in the Ringzug. This led to the reactivation of this section, which was not originally planned, leaving the Donaueschingen–Immendingen gap.

After the end of the InterRegio traffic on the Black Forest Railway and changes in the timing of services on this line, it would be now be possible for Ringzug services to operate through the gap between Immendingen and Donaueschingen. This would connect Geisingen station, Geisingen-Gutmadingen, Donaueschingen-Neudingen and Donaueschingen-Pfohren. This is frequently the subject of political discussion, but operations are not currently planned.

=== Services ===
- RB 42: Bräunlingen – Donaueschingen – Villingen (Schwarzw) – Schwenningen (Neckar) – Trossingen Bf – Rottweil
- RB 42a: Trossingen Bf – Trossingen Stadt
- RB 43: Rottweil – Spaichingen – Tuttlingen – Immendingen – Geisingen-Leipferdingen (– Blumberg-Zollhaus)

=== Stations ===
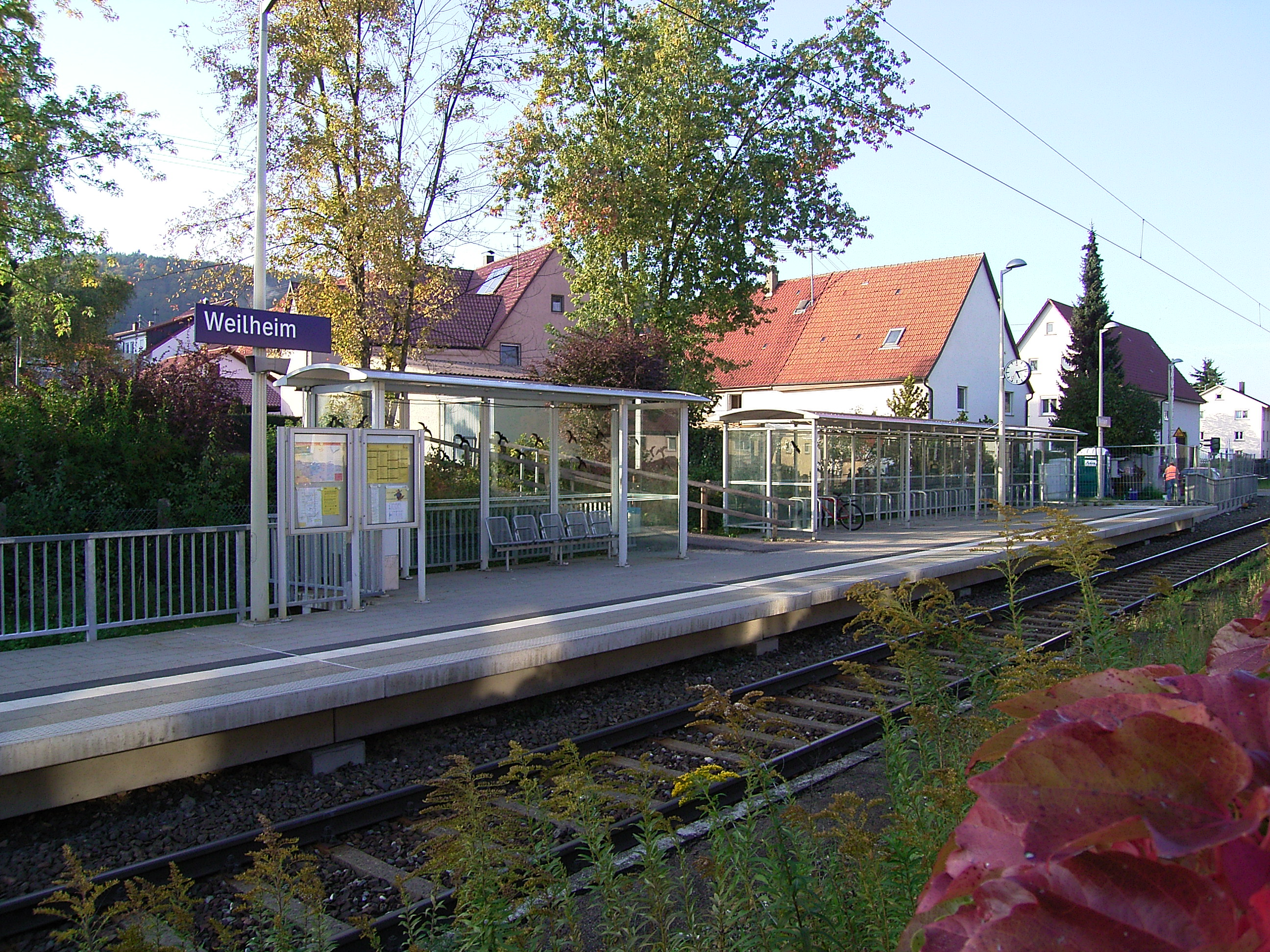
Weilheim station on the Plochingen–Immendingen railway; the station was restored for Ringzug services

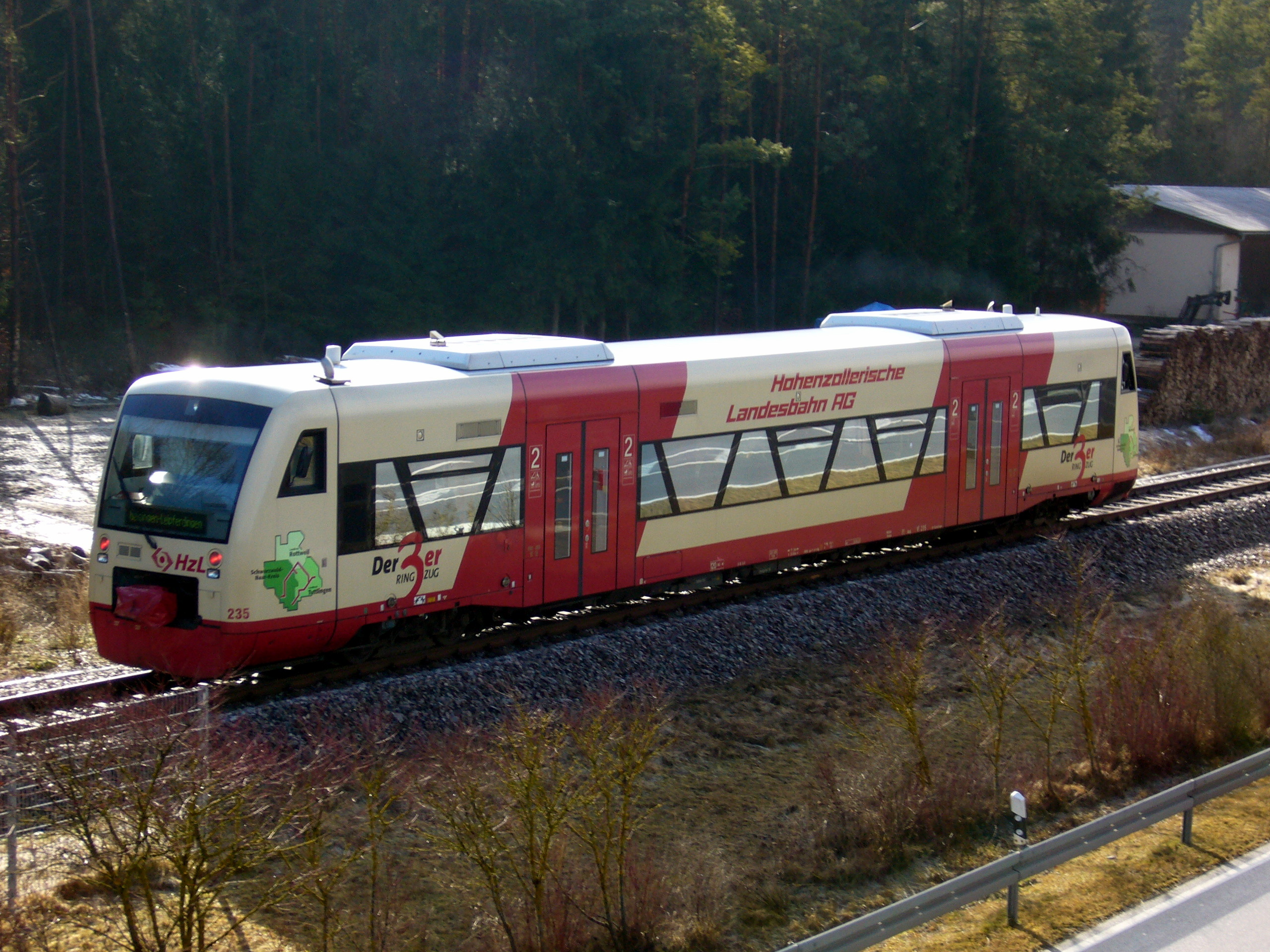
Near Geisingen-Kirchen on the Wutach Valley Railway

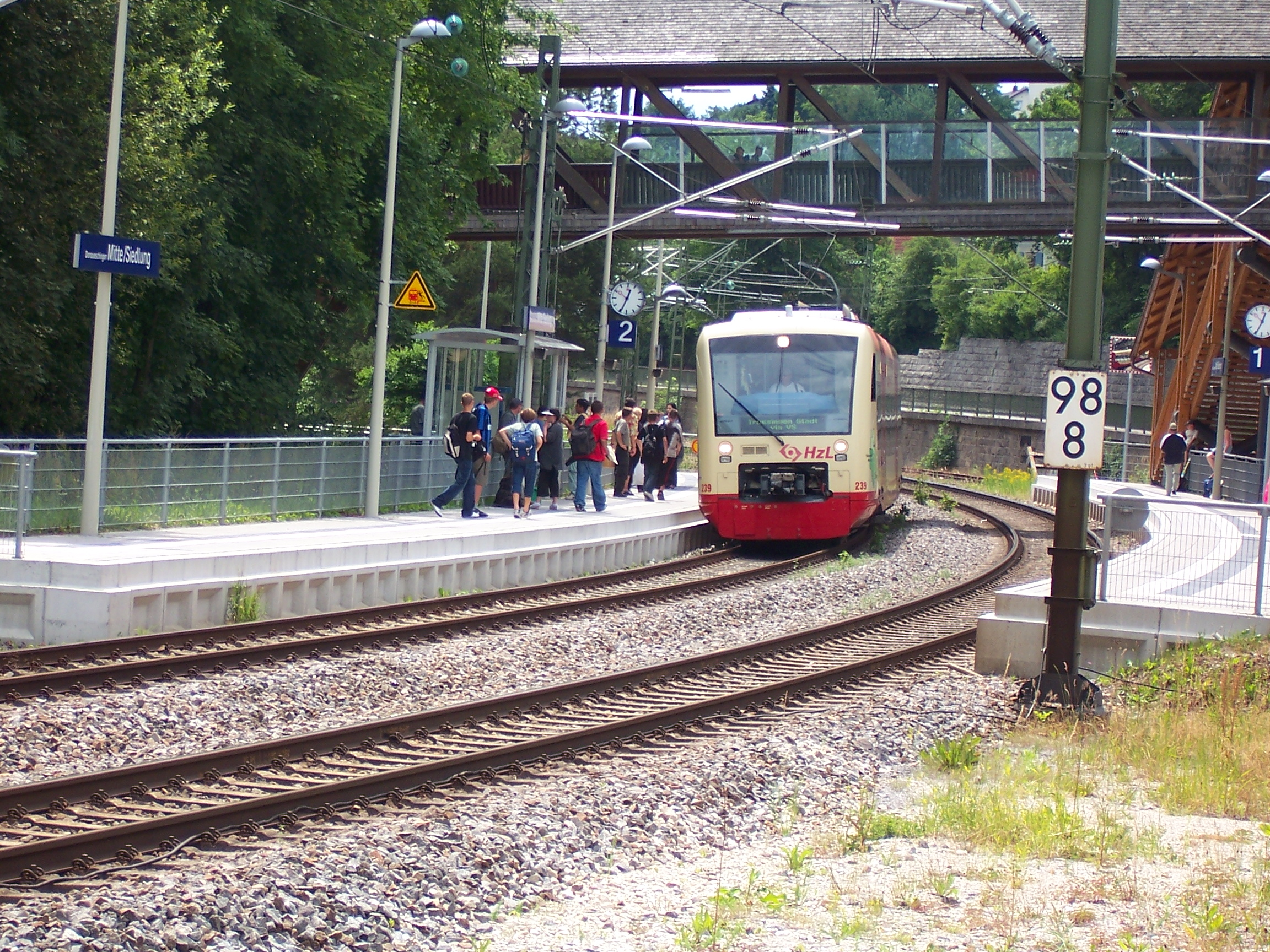
At Donaueschingen Mitte/Siedlung station on the Black Forest Railway

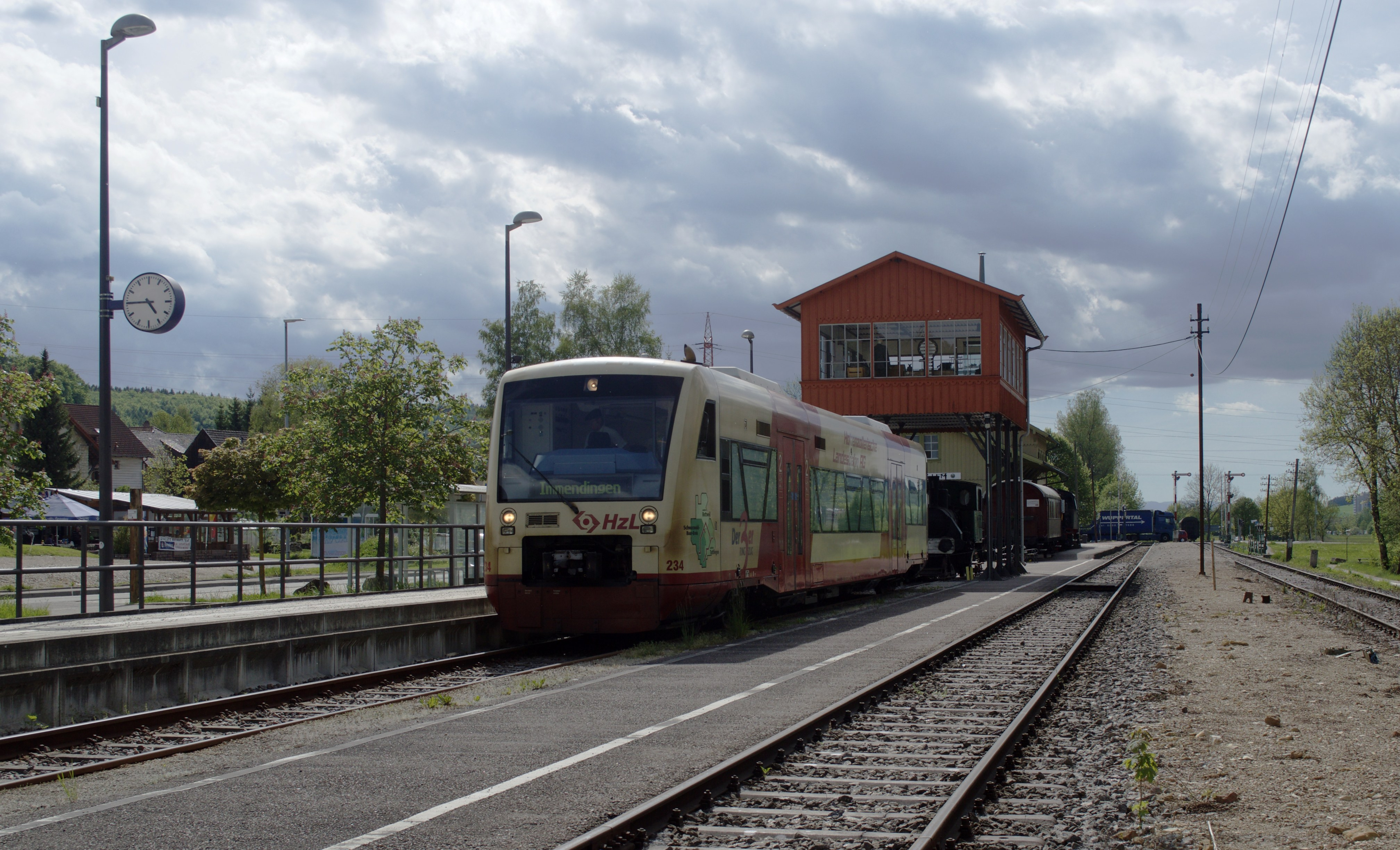
Blumberg-Zollhaus is the southern terminus of the Ringzug

By 2004, DB Station&Service established 18 new stations and reactivated 16 abandoned stations for the Ringzug operations. Some existing stations were moved closer to their respective settlements. The average distance between the stations is 1.9 kilometres. All municipalities and parts of municipalities lying on lines are usually connected, so that the large towns will continue to have one or even several stations. Many of the Ringzug stations are request stops, most have access for the disabled.

Station	km	Route	Transport association
Bräunlingen	0	Breg Valley Railway	VSB
Bräunlingen Industriegebiet	3	Breg Valley Railway	VSB
Hüfingen Mitte	6	Breg Valley Railway	VSB
Donaueschingen Allmendshofen	7	Breg Valley Railway	VSB
Donaueschingen	8	Breg Valley Railway/ Black Forest Railway	VSB
Donaueschingen Mitte / Siedlung	9	Black Forest Railway	VSB
Donaueschingen Aufen	11	Black Forest Railway	VSB
Donaueschingen Grüningen	14	Black Forest Railway	VSB
Brigachtal Klengen	17	Black Forest Railway	VSB
Brigachtal Kirchdorf	18	Black Forest Railway	VSB
Marbach West (Villingen-Schwenningen)	19	Black Forest Railway	VSB
Villingen (Schwarzw)	22	Black Forest Railway/ Rottweil–Villingen	VSB
Marbach Ost (Villingen-Schwenningen)	25	Rottweil–Villingen	VSB
Zollhaus (Villingen-Schwenningen)	28	Rottweil–Villingen	VSB
Schwenningen Eisstadion	30	Rottweil–Villingen	VSB
Schwenningen (Neckar)	31	Rottweil–Villingen	VSB
Schwenningen Hammerstatt	32	Rottweil–Villingen	VSB
Trossingen	37	Rottweil–Villingen	TUTicket, VSB, VVR
Deißlingen Mitte	40	Rottweil–Villingen	VVR
Rottweil Saline	46	Rottweil–Villingen	VVR
Rottweil	49	Rottweil–Villingen / Stuttgart–Hattingen	VVR
Rottweil Göllsdorf	50	Stuttgart–Hattingen	VVR
Rottweil Saline	52	Stuttgart–Hattingen	VVR
Rottweil-Neufra	56	Stuttgart–Hattingen	VVR
Aldingen (b Spaichingen)	60	Stuttgart–Hattingen	TUTicket
Spaichingen Mitte	62	Stuttgart–Hattingen	TUTicket
Spaichingen	64	Stuttgart–Hattingen	TUTicket
Balgheim	66	Stuttgart–Hattingen	TUTicket
Rietheim (Württ)	69	Stuttgart–Hattingen	TUTicket
Weilheim (Württ)	71	Stuttgart–Hattingen	TUTicket
Wurmlingen Nord	73	Stuttgart–Hattingen	TUTicket
Wurmlingen Mitte	74	Stuttgart–Hattingen	TUTicket
Tuttlingen Schulen	76	Stuttgart–Hattingen	TUTicket
Tuttlingen	77	Stuttgart–Hattingen / Tuttlingen–Inzigkofen	TUTicket
Tuttlingen Gänsäcker	78	Tuttlingen–Inzigkofen	TUTicket
Möhringen	81	Tuttlingen–Inzigkofen	TUTicket
Möhringen Rathaus	82	Tuttlingen–Inzigkofen	TUTicket
Immendingen Mitte	87	Tuttlingen–Inzigkofen	TUTicket
Immendingen	88	Tuttlingen–Inzigkofen	TUTicket
Immendingen-Zimmern	89	Tuttlingen–Inzigkofen/ Wutach Valley Railway	TUTicket
Geisingen-Hausen	93	Wutach Valley Railway	TUTicket
Geisingen-Kirchen	94	Wutach Valley Railway	TUTicket
Geisingen-Aulfingen	96	Wutach Valley Railway	TUTicket
Geisingen-Leipferdingen	99	Wutach Valley Railway	TUTicket, VSB
Blumberg-Riedöschingen	103	Wutach Valley Railway	VSB
Blumberg-Zollhaus	107	Wutach Valley Railway	VSB

== Operations and Organisation ==
=== Links with other transport modes ===
With the start of Ringzug operations, public transport services in the region has been fundamentally reorganised. Parallel bus services along the railway lines were largely discontinued. Buses have since then served as feeders to the railway and have been coordinated with Ringzug services. Important points of connection between the railway and buses are at Bräunlingen station, Donaueschingen station, Brigachtal-Klengen, Brigachtal-Kirchdorf, Villingen (Schwarzwald), Schwenningen, Rottweil, Aldingen, Tuttlingen, Immendingen, Geisingen-Hausen and Geisingen-Leipferdingen.

In Rottweil, Ringzug services running in both directions coordinate with long-distance services on the Plochingen–Immendingen railway, so all stations between Leipferdingen and Rottweil have connections to following InterCity trains running every two hours to Stuttgart. In Immendingen and Villingen there are regular connections to the Black Forest Railway towards Karlsruhe or Konstanz. In the summer the Ringzug also connects at Blumberg-Zollhaus with the Museum Railway to Weizen.

=== Transport and cycle sequence ===
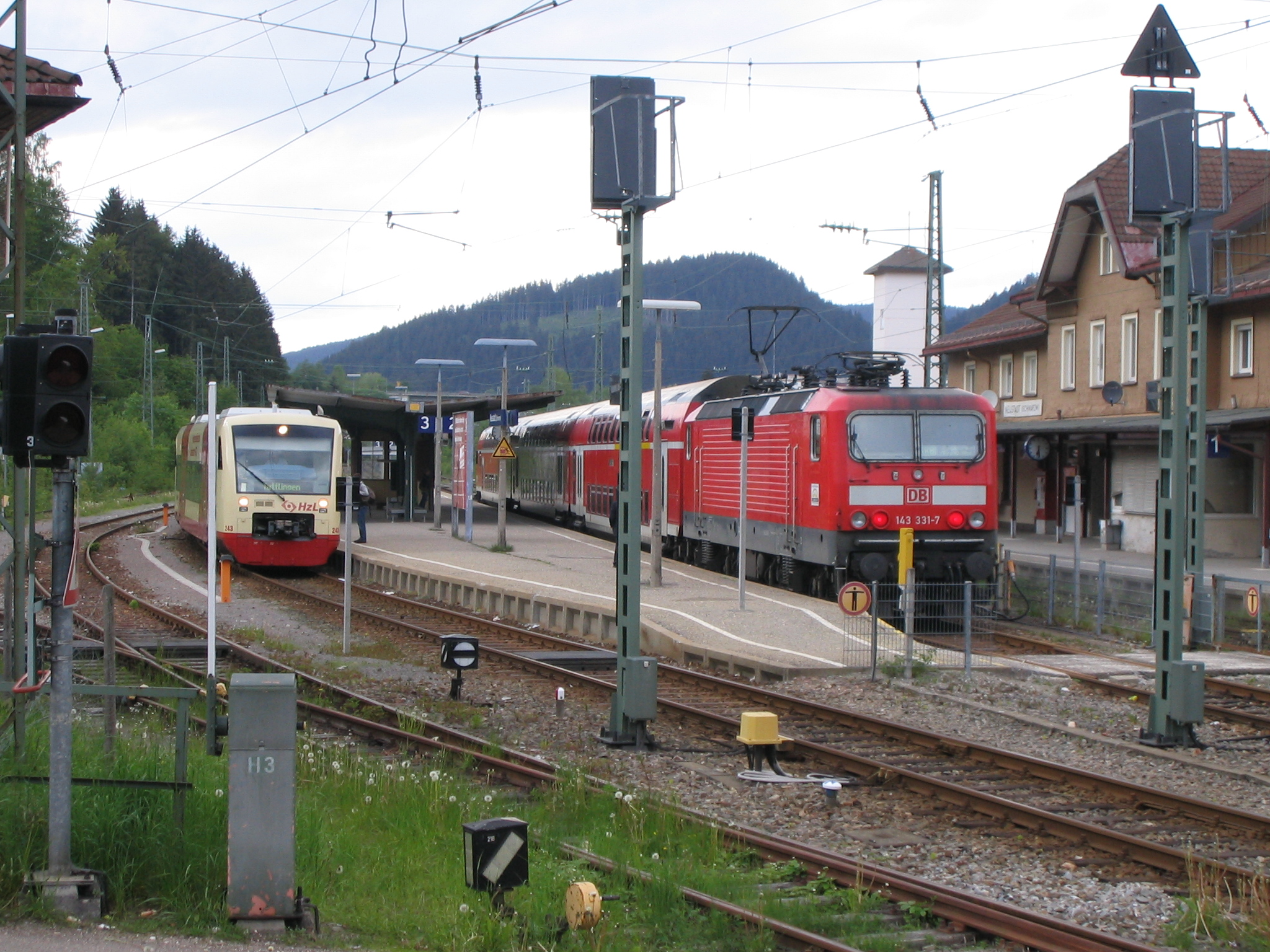
A railcar at the edge of the network in Neustadt (Schwarzwald)

The Ringzug operates on both weekdays and weekends over the line from Bräunlingen to Geisingen-Leipferdingen or Blumberg at a two-hour regular interval. On weekdays this basic service is supplemented by numerous additional services which usually do not complete the basic route. Many trains start or end in Rottweil or Trossingen Stadt and run to or from Leipferdingen. On weekdays there are services between Bräunlingen and Trossingen and between Rottweil and Leipferdingen at least once an hour. This service is amplified again on some section during the peak, so that, for example, between Tuttlingen and Spaichingen on weekdays between 15:00 and 18:00, giving an approximate half-hour service. However, between Trossingen and Rottweil on weekdays during the off-peak there is only a two-hour basic service, so Deißlingen station outside the peak and on weekdays is served only every two hours.

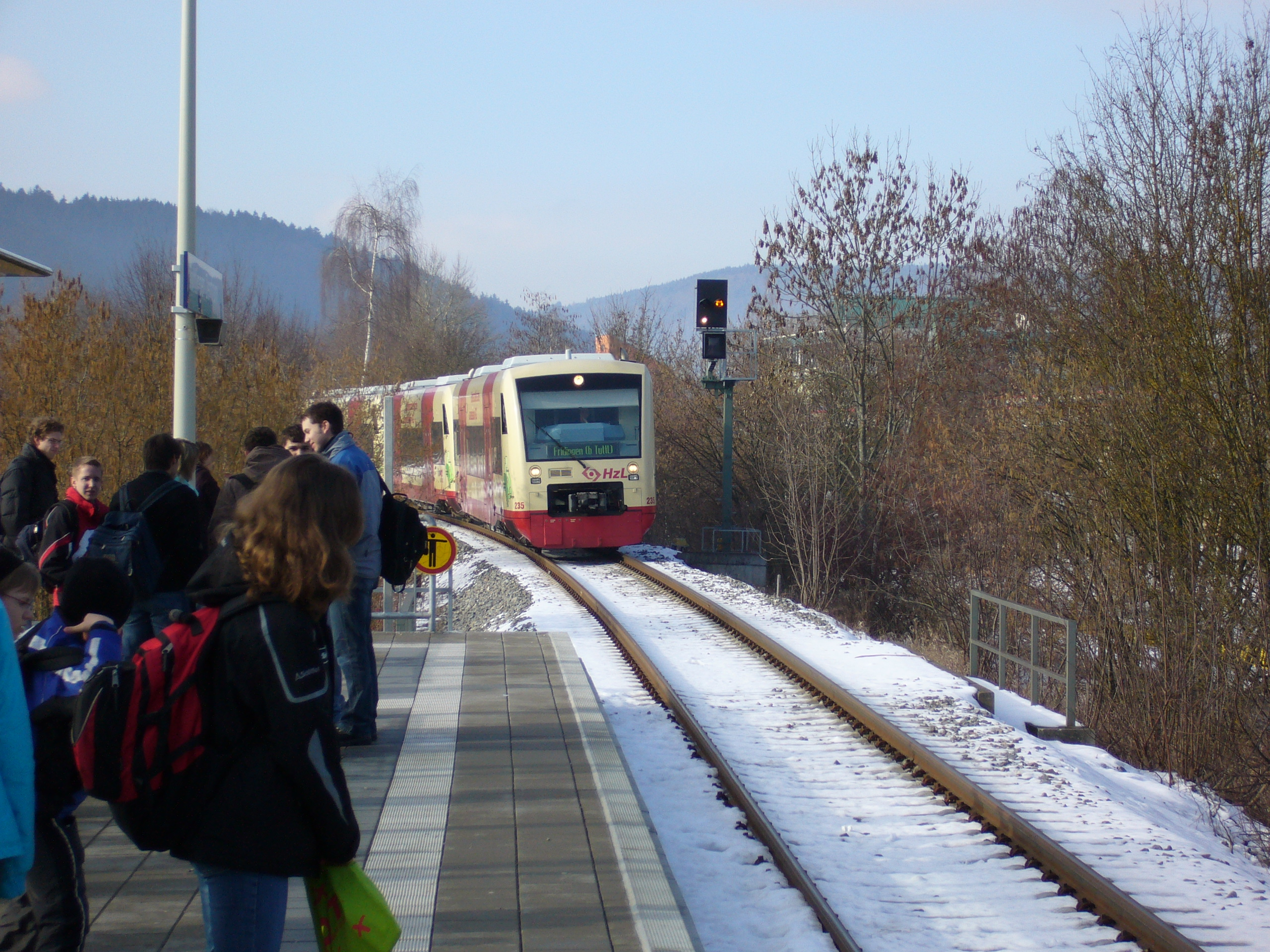
An operation under multiple-unit train control on the section between Tuttlingen and Fridingen, which is not served at regular intervals

Some services do not run to the regular interval pattern. So trains run on the Trossingen Railway stop at Trossingen Bahnhof to ensure that nearly all connections can be achieved. On the Tuttlingen–Inzigkofen railway section from Tuttlingen to Fridingen an der Donau, however, the Ringzug services do not run at regular intervals. Only irregular services operate on weekdays. At the weekend there are no Ringzug services. Here, the majority of public transport traffic continues to be handled by buses. Most Ringzug services on the Wutach Valley Railway on weekdays begin in Leipferdingen rather than in Zollhaus-Blumberg so that the Wutach Valley Railway section between Leipferdingen and Zollhaus on weekdays is mostly also served by buses. A few Ringzug services run off the formal route network to Sigmaringen and to Neustadt (Schwarzw). One pair of trains also runs on school days from Immendingen via Geisingen station to Donaueschingen.

Ringzug trains operate 1,258,000 train-kilometres annually.

=== Rolling stock ===
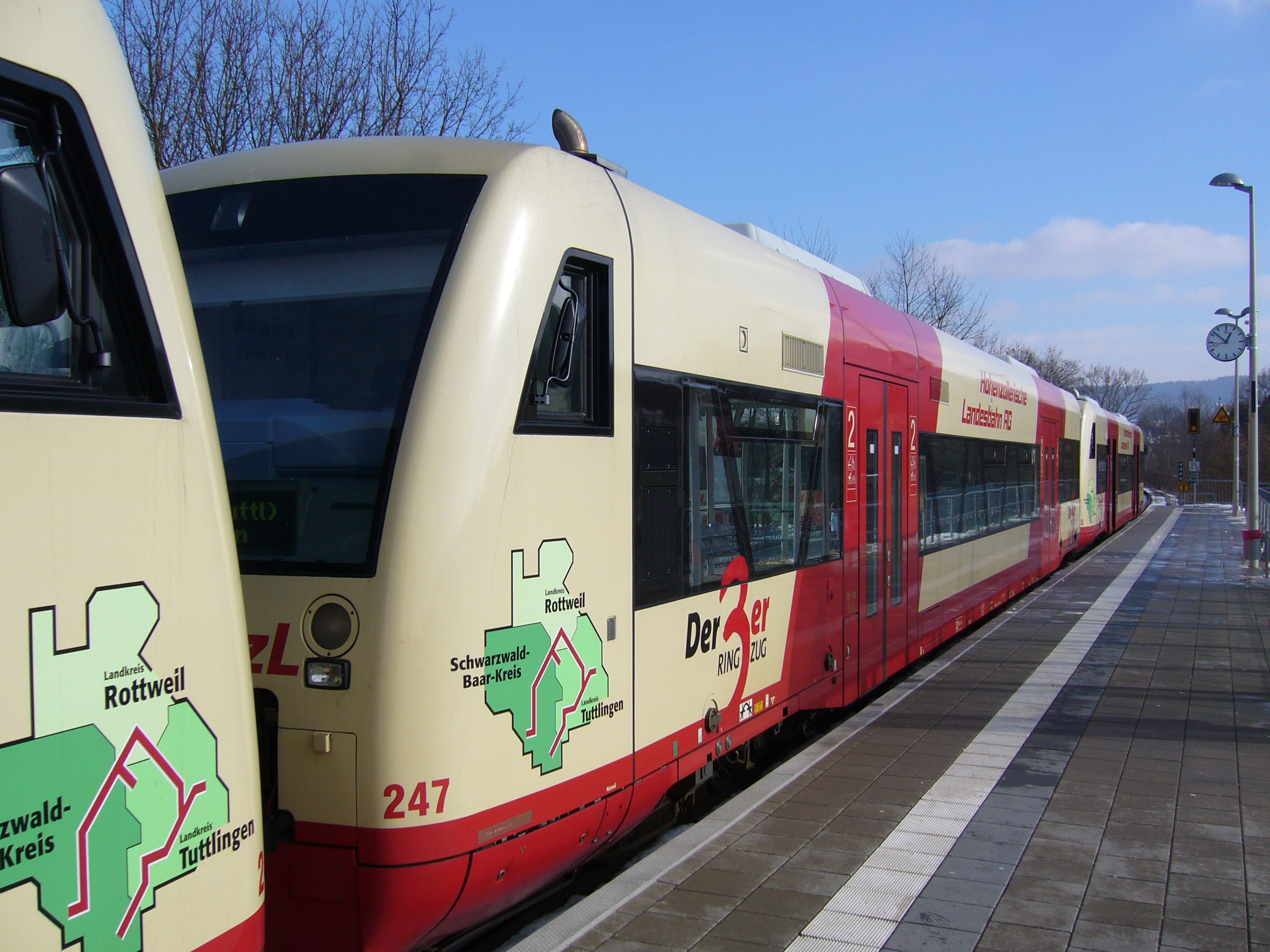
Railcars under multiple-unit train control

Ringzug services are operated by DMUs former by 20 Stadler Regio-Shuttle RS1 sets. They differ from other vehicles of this type in that there are sockets at some seats for laptop use. There is also one ticket machine in each railcar. All are air conditioned and have a toilet.

In the morning peak hour Ringzug services are partly carried out in cooperation with DB Regio and are operated with class 425 EMUs. This is because the Ringzug Regio Shuttles cannot handle the high demand at this time. The Ringzug plans to operate class 611 sets.

The unexpectedly high ridership quickly led to capacity constraints, meaning among other things, that from December 2004 vintage railcars of the T3 and T5 model built in 1938 and 1956, were restored to service on the Trossingen Railway for regular services. The modern Regio-Shuttle sets that were actually intended to run on the Trossingen Railway were used to run in multiple on other unexpectedly heavily loaded trains on other routes.

== See also ==
- List of railway routes in Baden-Württemberg
