= Ulrich Grosse =

German transport consultant

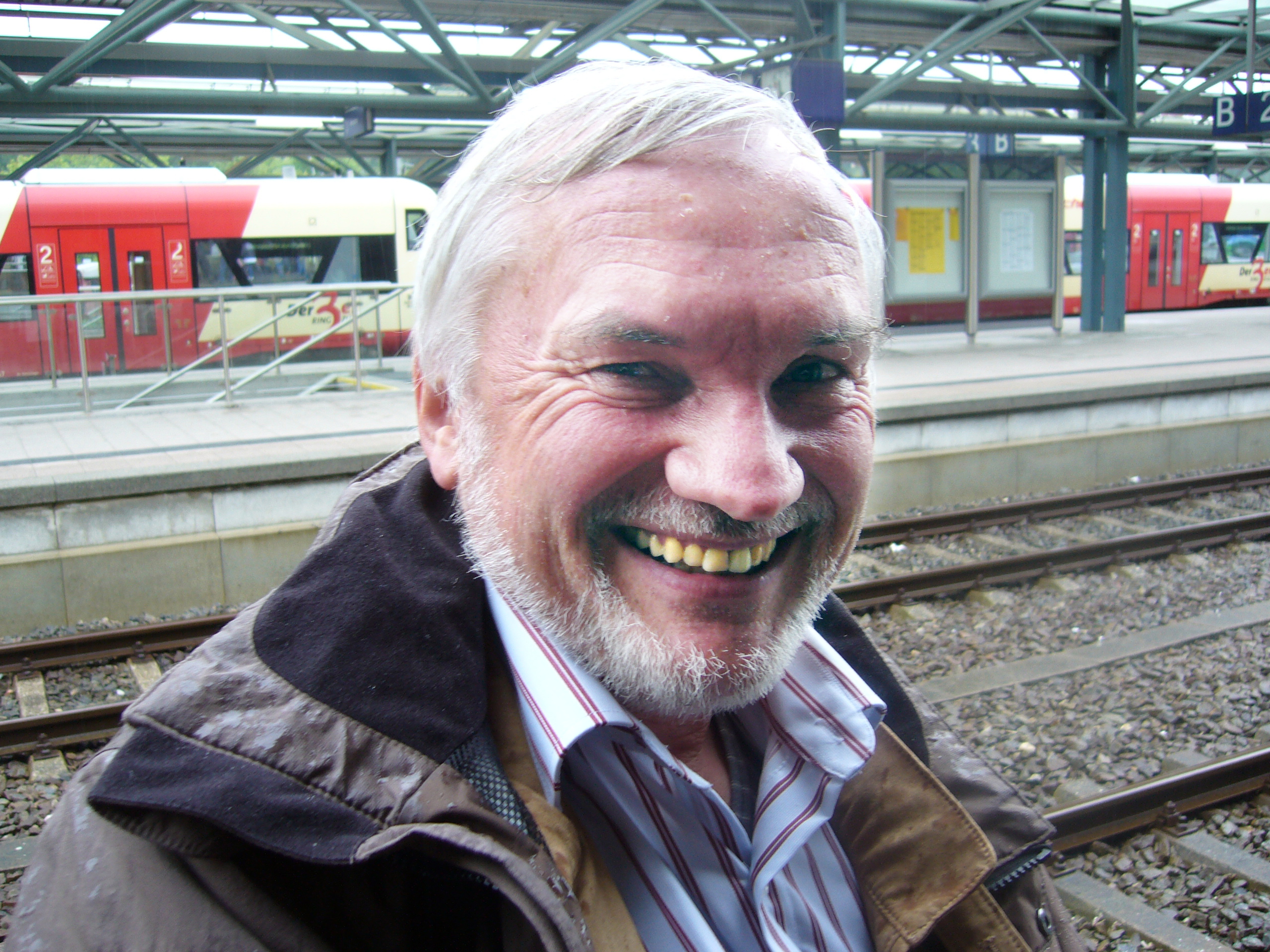
Ulrich Grosse at the celebration of Five Years of Ringzug in the Tuttlingen, Rottweil und Black Forrest-Baar districts in 2008

Ulrich Grosse is a German public transport consultant. He was in 1983 one of the first specialists who advised counties in terms of public passenger transport. Numerous transport concepts and the reactivation of a number of railroad tracks are based on his work.

== Life and career ==
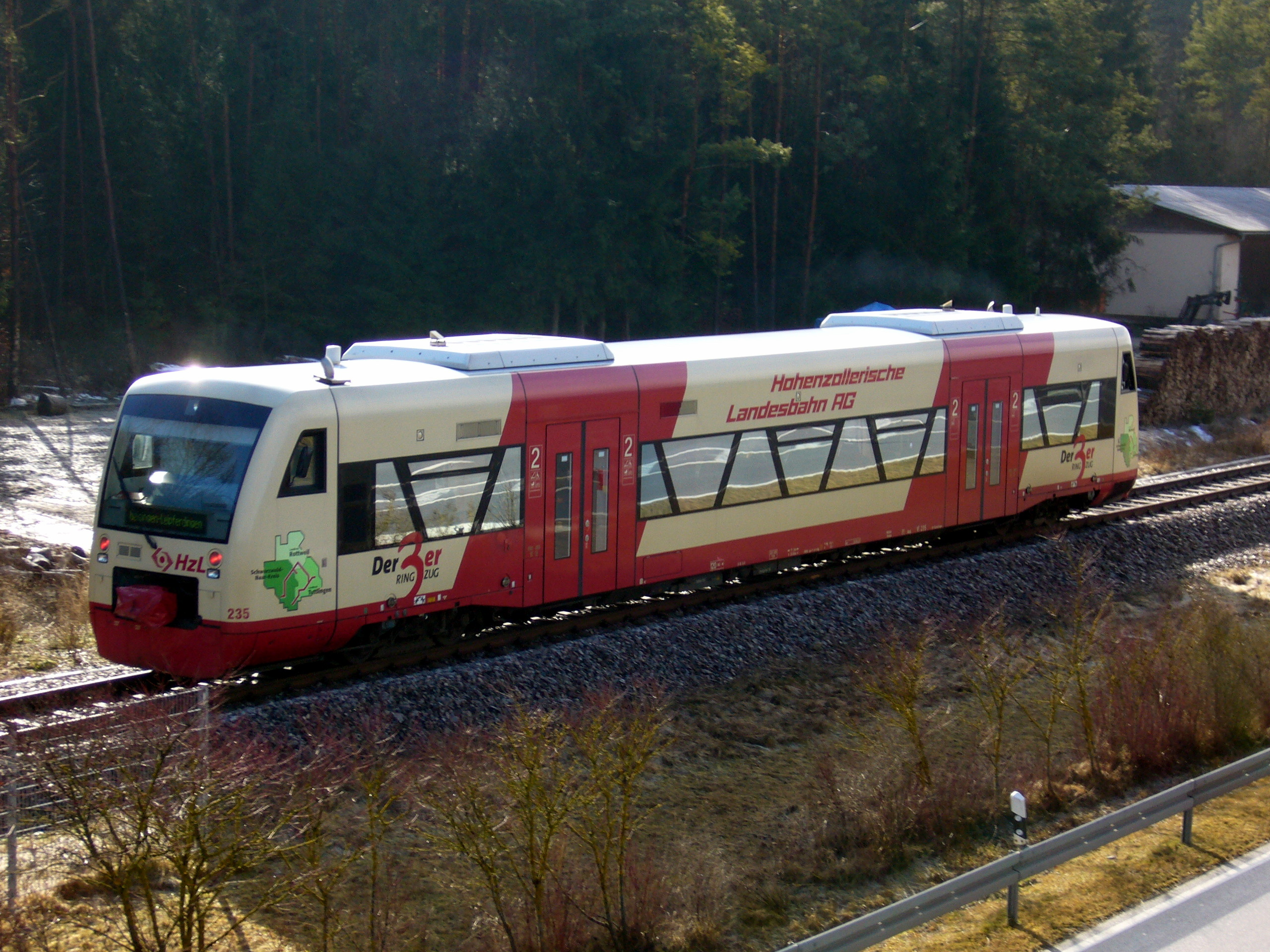
A train on the Ringzug of the Wutach Valley Railway (2007), reactivation of which was based on Grosse's advice

Ulrich Grosse grew up in Nagold and studied mathematics and physics at the University of Tübingen. From 1972 to 1982 he represented the city of Nagold in committee meetings of the Regional Association of the Northern Black Forest and the Chamber of Commerce of that region. He was involved in the improvement of transport service on the Nagold Valley Railway. From 1972 he worked with a citizens' initiative to reactivate the Ammertalbahn, though the attempt failed. In 1978 he became a teacher.

In 1984 he succeeded in implementing a new station south of Balingen after decades of closure of stations. This was the first time that a new train stop outside of metropolitan areas in Baden-Württemberg was opened after a period of closures of railway stations.

He argues that public transport should be shifted from road to rail. Traffic by trains and busses along railroad tracks should be interlinked within clock-face schedules. He observed that public passenger transport in the rural community is generally best served by shuttle services to train stations. Thus he advises that bus services should not run in parallel to railroad tracks, but rather serve as a perpendicular feeder to the rail.
