= Immendingen station =

Railway station in Immendingen, Germany

Immendingen
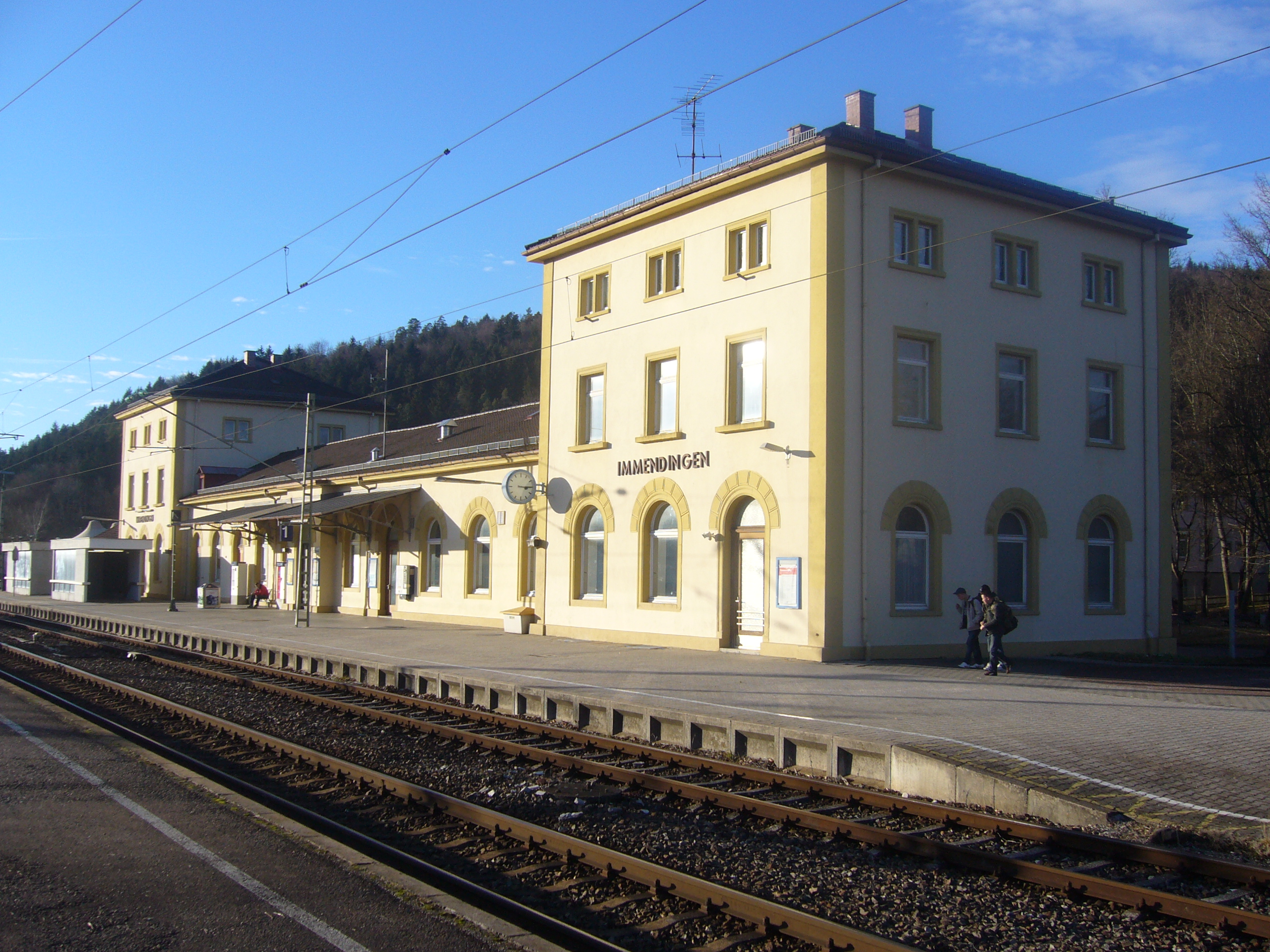
- Immendingen station from the trackside

General information
- Location: Bahnhofplatz 1, Immendingen, Baden-Württemberg; Germany
- Coordinates: 47°56′10″N 8°43′47″E
- Elevation: 658 m (2,159 ft)
- Owner: DB Netz
- Operator: DB Station&Service
- Lines: Black Forest Railway (km 119.0) (KBS 720); Stuttgart–Immendingen railway (km 161.0) (KBS 740)
- Platforms: 5

Construction
- Accessible: No (except platform 1)

Other information
- Station code: 2982
- DS100 code: RIM
- IBNR: 8000182
- Category: 4
- Fare zone: Move: 8
- Website: www.bahnhof.de

History
- Opened: 15 June 1868

Services
Preceding station	DB Regio Baden-Württemberg	Following station
Donaueschingen towards Karlsruhe Hbf	RE 2	Engen towards Konstanz
Geisingen towards Villingen (Schwarzwald)	RE 55	Tuttlingen towards Ulm Hbf
Preceding station	(Offenburg)	Following station
Immendingen-Zimmern towards Blumberg-Zollhaus	RB 43	Immendingen Mitte towards Rottweil
Location

Immendingen station is a junction station in Immendingen in the German state of Baden-Württemberg. The Black Forest Railway from Offenburg to Konstanz connects with the Danube Valley Railway from Donaueschingen to Ulm meet at the station. Immendingen is also served by trains on the Wutach Valley Railway, which branches at the neighbouring Hintschingen station via Blumberg to Waldshut; regular passenger services have been restored on the section of the line to Blumberg since 2004 as part of the Ringzug concept. Until the construction of the Tuttlingen-Hattingen (Baden) connecting curve in 1934, Immendingen was also the terminus of trains from Stuttgart running over the Plochingen–Immendingen railway and Stuttgart–Horb railway (Gäubahn).

== History ==
On 15 June 1868, the Grand Duchy of Baden State Railway (Großherzoglich Badische Staatseisenbahnen) opened the section of the Black Forest Railway between Engen and Donaueschingen. This included Immendingen station. Two years later on 26 July 1870, the Royal Württemberg State Railways (Königlich Württembergischen Staats-Eisenbahnen) inaugurated the 9.7 km-long route between Tuttlingen and Immendingen, the last piece of the Upper Neckar Railway, providing a continuous connection from Immendingen via Tübingen to Stuttgart. Immendingen was the stop for the change of operational responsibility between Baden and Württemberg. In 1873, Baden completed the last sections of the Black Forest Railway. It also opened the ten-kilometre section from Tuttlingen junction on 26 November 1890, completing the Danube Valley Railway to Ulm via Sigmaringen. The line from Ulm to Sigmaringen had been completed in 1873. Under the treaty for the construction of Danube Valley Railway between Baden and Württemberg that had been concluded on 22 May 1875, Württemberg was responsible for the operation of the line, part of which ran through Baden territory. The section of the line from Immendingen junction to the junction with the Wutach Valley Railway at the neighbouring Hintschingen station was put into operation for military reasons on 20 May 1890, a few months before the completion of the Danube Valley Railway, with trains generally running from or to Immendingen. This made Immendingen station one of the most important railway junctions between Offenburg and Konstanz. Trains between Stuttgart and Zurich had to terminate and reverse at the station at the station and at the same time responsibility for operations was transferred between the Württemberg and the Baden railways. The station therefore had a locomotive depot of the Württemberg State Railways and a maintenance facilities for Baden locomotives.

Initially the incorporation of the two state railways into the newly formed Deutsche Reichsbahn in 1920 did not change the function of the station. The significance of the Immendingen rail junction was only reduced significantly on 15 May 1934 with the completion of the direct connection between Tuttlingen and Singen in the form of single-track 8.2 km-long line from Tuttlingen to Hattingen (Baden). The express trains between Stuttgart and Zurich have since used the new line bypassing Immendingen. The Immendingen locomotive depot, which formed part of the Singen locomotive depot, therefore also lost its importance, although during the Second World War, it temporarily became an independent locomotive depot.

The railway junction formed the economic backbone of the town of Immendingen for decades. There were jobs at the station, in the maintenance of the rail track and in external services. At its height, the share of railway workers, including their family members and railway pensioners, amounted to approximately 50% of the total resident population of Immendingen.

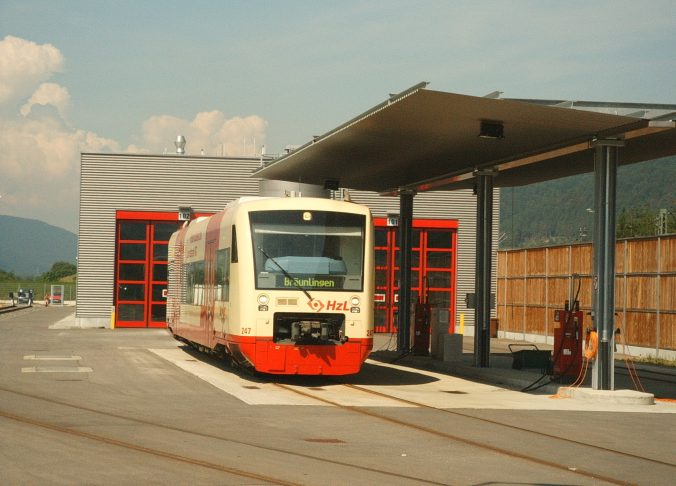
Ringzug rolling-stock depot of the HzL in Immendingen

In 2003, the line between Immendingen and Fridingen was integrated into the Ringzug network. An operating workshop of Hohenzollerische Landesbahn (HzL) has been located in Immendingen since 2004. It is used for the maintenance of Ringzug sets and training courses for new drivers are held there. Deutsche Bahn auctioned Immendingen station building in 2014 and it is now privately owned.

== Station facilities ==
Originally the station precinct included a locomotive depot for the Baden railway with a reception room, a turntable, a crane coal and coal store. It also included the Württemberg railway's administration and depot, including a hand-operated turntable. When the electrically operated turntable was installed in Zimmern in 1926, these facilities were decommissioned. The construction of a new locomotive hall in 1937-38 delayed the demolition of these buildings until 1941–42. The largest hall with seven entrances was built at the west end of the station together with an accommodation building for drivers from Zimmern and the associated tracks. From 1946 to 1953, the locomotive hall served as a rolling stock depot.

The operator of the Ringzug, the Hohenzollerische Landesbahn, built a depot in Immendingen with a number of workspaces.

== Transport services ==
There are direct connections to, among other places Ulm, Konstanz, Karlsruhe and Neustadt im Schwarzwald.

=== Long distance ===
Immendingen station is served by a pair of InterCity trains, the Bodensee, running between Emden and Konstanz and operated by Deutsche Bahn long-distance services. This station is frequently used in the summer months to reach the tourist regions of the Black Forest and Lake Constance by rail. A pair of IC trains called the Schwarzwald from Hamburg to Konstanz was abandoned in December 2014 due to low usage.

Line	Route	Frequency
IC 35	Norddeich Mole – Emden Hbf – Münster (Westf) Hbf – Duisburg – Cologne – Bonn – Koblenz – Mannheim – Karlsruhe – Offenburg – Villingen (Schwarzw) – Immendingen – Singen (Hohentwiel) – Konstanz	Single pair of trains on weekends

=== Regional services ===
Trains on the Black Forest Railway stop here every hour in each direction.

Line	Route	Frequency
RE 2	Karlsruhe – Baden-Baden – Achern – Offenburg – Villingen (Schwarzw) – Donaueschingen – Immendingen – Singen (Hohentwiel) – Konstanz	Hourly
RE 55	Neustadt (Schwarzw) – Donaueschingen – Immendingen – Tuttlingen – Sigmaringen – Riedlingen – Schelklingen – Ulm Hbf	Hourly, with exceptions
RB 43 (SWEG)	3er-Ringzug: Bräunlingen – Donaueschingen – Villingen (Schwarzw) – Schwenningen (Neckar) – Trossingen station – Rottweil – Spaichingen – Tuttlingen – Immendingen – Blumberg-Zollhaus	60 min (Mon–Fri); 120 min (Sat+Sun)

=== Bus services ===
Attached to the station is a small bus station with four bus platforms on which bus routes 405, 410, 420, 430 and 450 stop, connecting Immendingen station with Emmingen-Liptingen, Geisingen, Möhringen an der Danube, Ippingen, Hattingen and Mauenheim.

== Other stations in Immendingen ==
Apart from Immendingen station, the town contains the halts of Immendingen Mitte and Immendingen Zimmern, both of which are exclusively served by the Ringzug.
