= Wutach Valley Railway =

Railway in Baden-Württemberg, Germany

Coordinates: 47°50′16″N 8°33′23″E

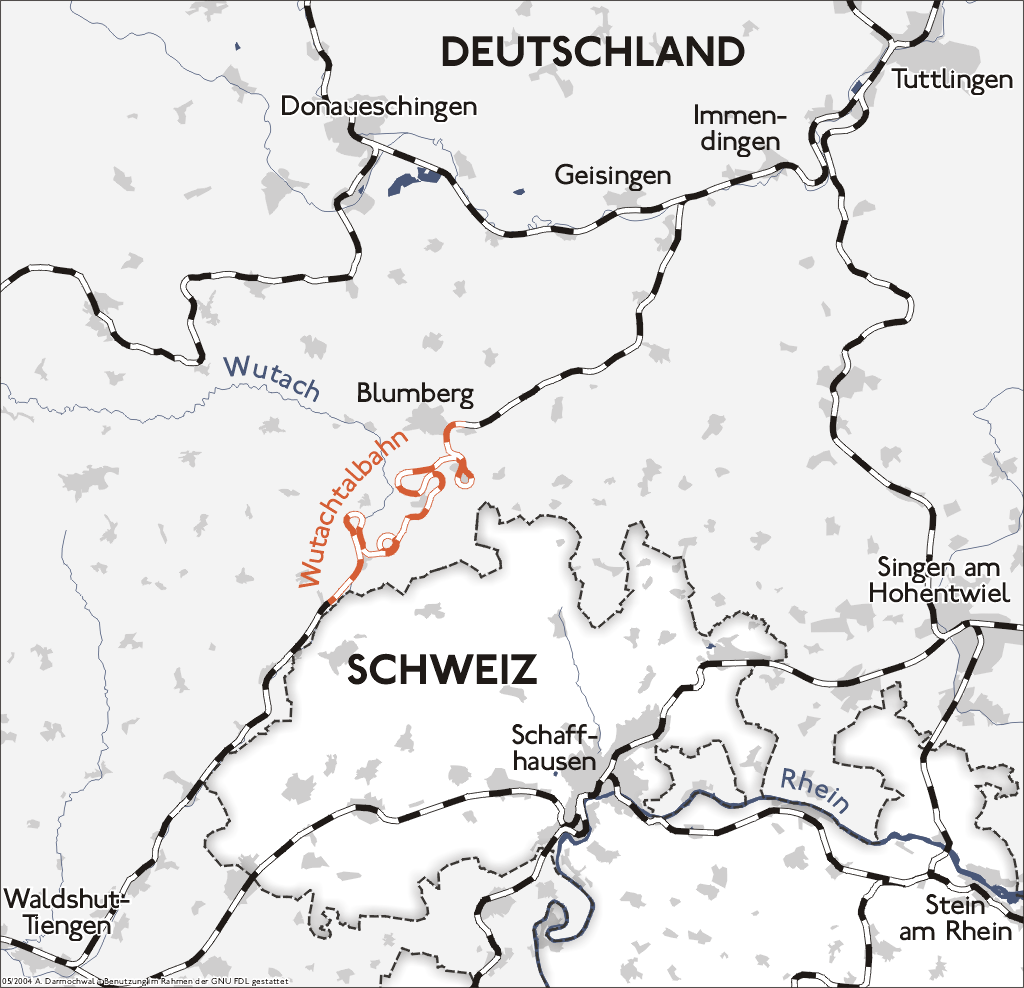

Overview
- Native name: Wutachtalbahn
- Line number: 4403
- Locale: Baden-Württemberg, Germany
- Termini: Lauchringen; Immendingen

Service
- Route number: 743, 12737

Technical
- Line length: 61.5 km (38.2 mi)
- Track gauge: 1,435 mm (4 ft 8 1/2 in) standard gauge

The Wutach Valley Railway (German: Wutachtalbahn) is a railway line in southern Germany that mostly follows the Valley of the river Wutach and partly the border between the German state of Baden-Württemberg and the Swiss canton of Schaffhausen. It links the town of Waldshut-Tiengen on the High Rhine Railway (Hochrheinbahn) with Immendingen on the Black Forest Railway (Schwarzwaldbahn). Because of the twisting route of its central section, it is popularly known as the Sauschwänzlebahn (lit. 'pigtail line'). It is the only line in Germany with a spiral tunnel.

== History ==
The line was planned in the 1860s, though construction was not completed until the 1890s, and its purpose was at least partly strategic, to allow a means for moving military supplies around the south of the Black Forest; the German Empire having seized Alsace and Lorraine from the French in the Franco-Prussian War of 1870-71, a revenge attack in this area from the French or a preemptive strike to prevent one were key issues in German military thinking at the time. The normal commercial route along the Rhine passed into Swiss territory so could not be used for military purposes.

The southern section of the line, following the valley of the Wutach from Waldshut-Tiengen to Weizen (part of the town of Stühlingen), is relatively conventional. However, the middle section, from Weizen to Blumberg, involved an approximately 250 m (820 ft) gain in height, and the military authorities specified that the line must not have a gradient of more than 1:100 since there was a need to move heavy military equipment. Accordingly, the line proceeds in a series of curves (including one complete circle), taking 26.5 km (16.5 mi) of track to travel a beeline distance of 9.5 km (5.9 mi), with spectacular large viaducts, tunnels and bridges including the only spiral railway tunnel in Germany. The track is of standard gauge and is mainly single track; the bridges and tunnels were built on a scale to allow eventual doubling of the track, though this was never carried out. The final section, from Blumberg to meet the Black Forest Railway near Geisingen, is again relatively conventional. The unconventional configuration of the track resulted in increased fares, as ticket prices were calculated on the distance travelled along the track.

The line did indeed play a strategic role at various times in its history, and its most recent refurbishment (in the early 1960s) was carried out with NATO funds, although in this case if the line had been used for military purposes the traffic would probably have been in the opposite direction. However, in the period after the Second World War its commercial use declined, and, section by section, passenger service was withdrawn, though the southern section remained open for freight traffic until 2001. After the Deutsche Bundesbahn withdrew passenger services on the central section in 1974, a voluntary organization was set up in 1976 to re-open it as a museum line under steam traction, and it is now a popular tourist attraction. There have been a number of initiatives to re-open passenger services on the other sections of the line as part of a regional transport strategy, and since December 2004 the northern section has formed part of the 3rd Ring Railway (3er Ringzug) network of local railway lines (RB 42 service) in the south-eastern part of the Black Forest, in the districts of Tuttlingen, Rottweil and Schwarzwald-Baar. The southern section was reopened and since January 2024 trains operate every two hours from Waldshut to Weizen (RB 37).

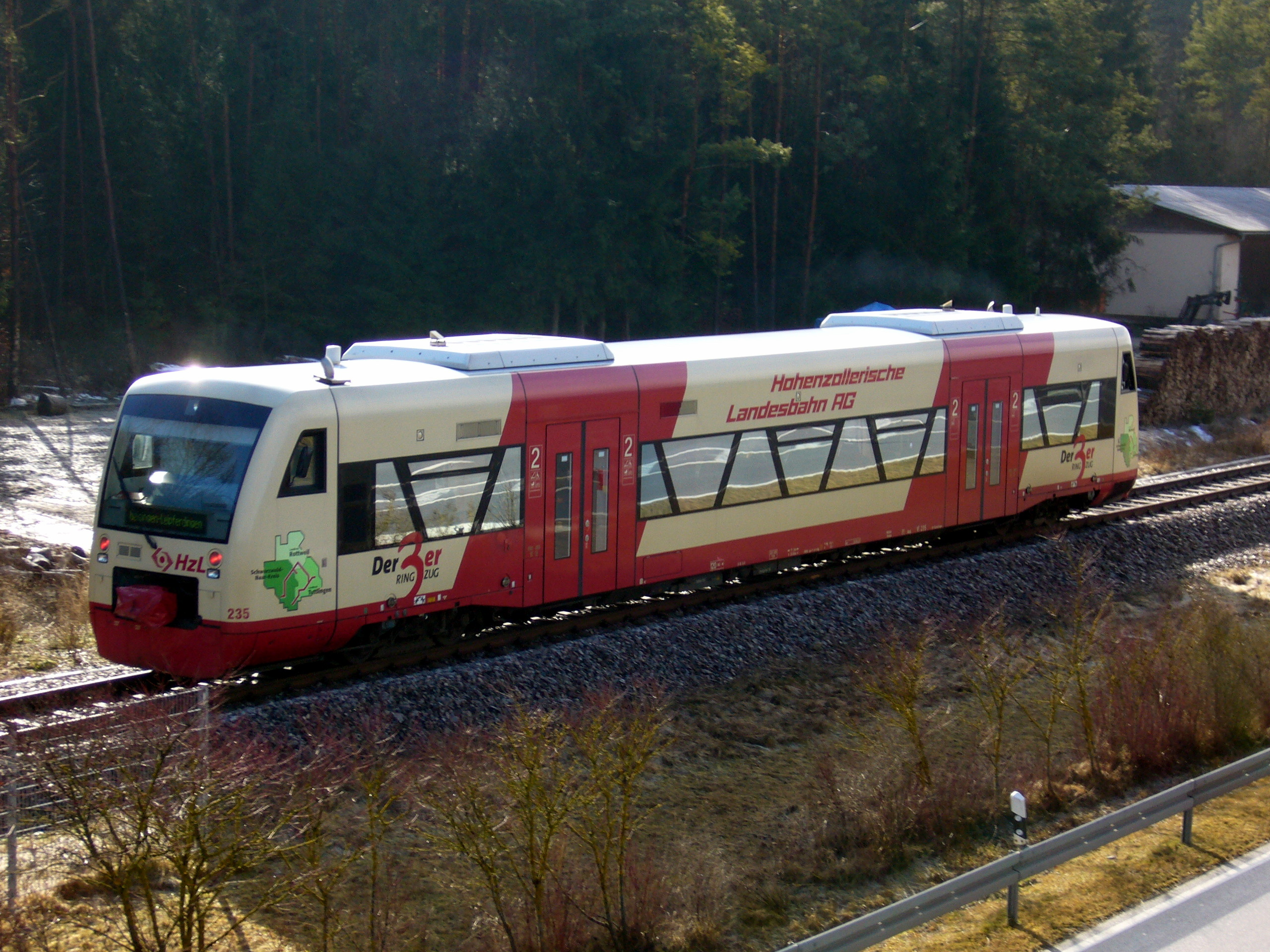
A Ringzug train in Kirchen

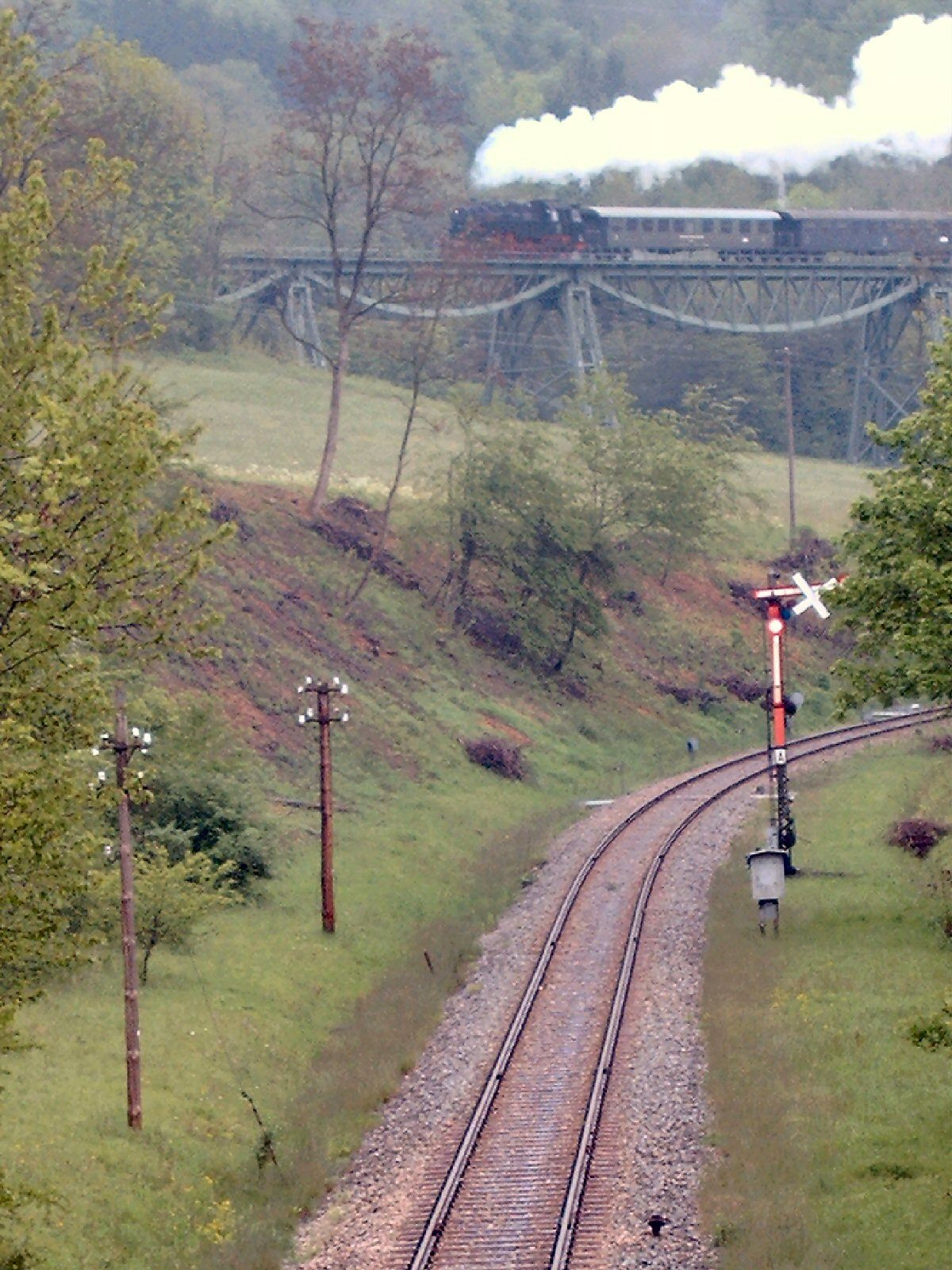
A heritage train near Epfenhofen

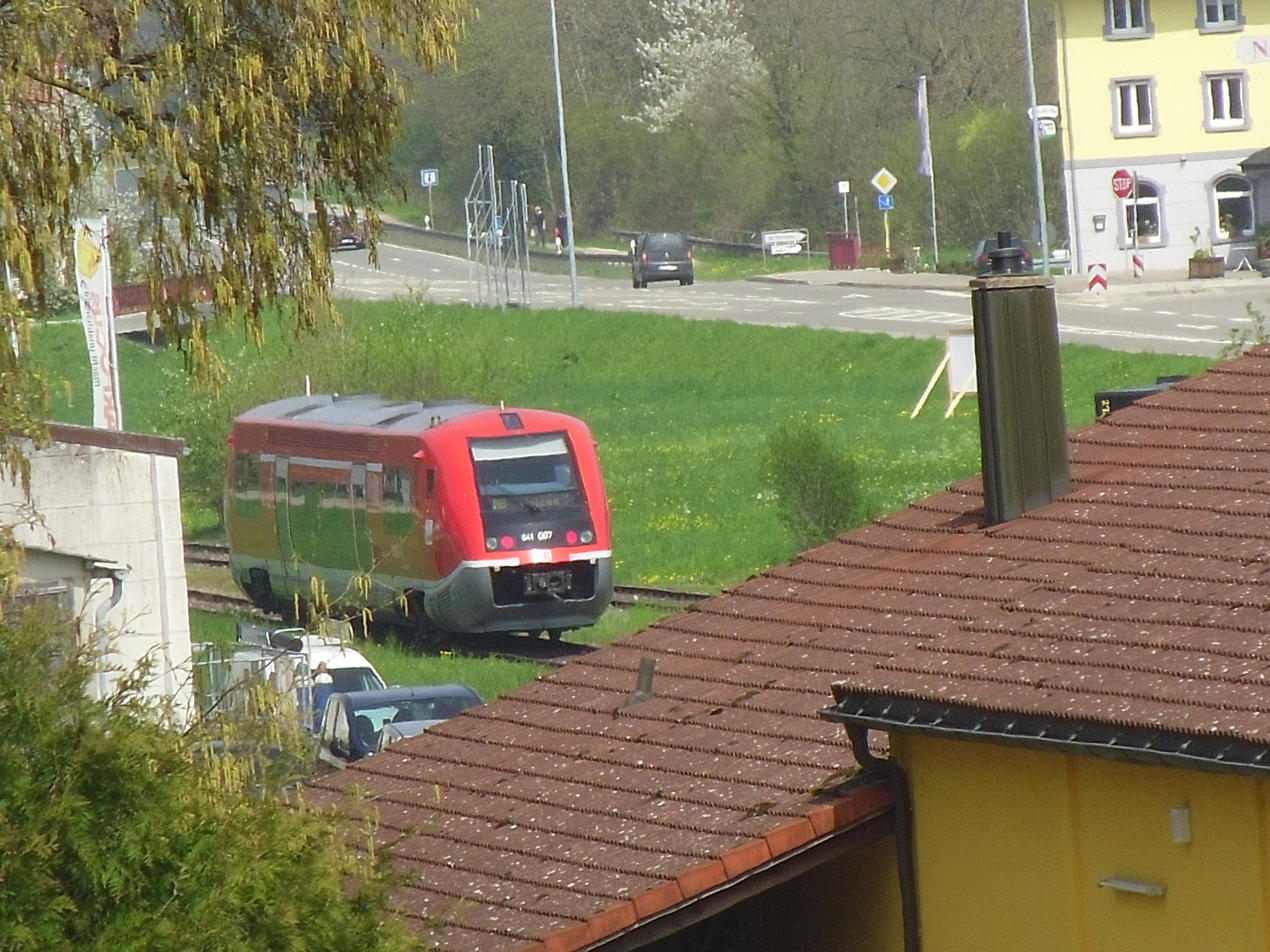
RB 37 near Stühlingen

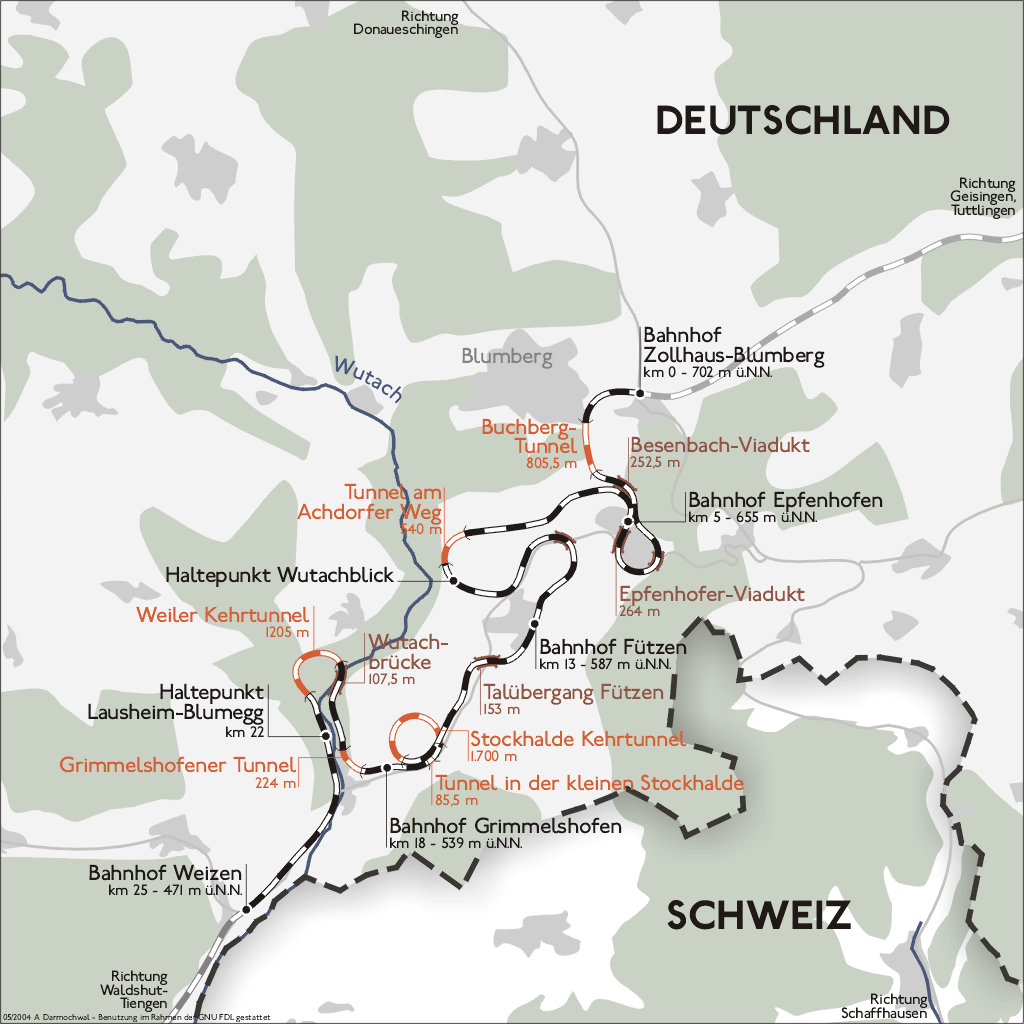
Map of the "Pigtail Line" stretch of the Wutachtalbahn
