= Donaueschingen station =

Railway station in Baden-Württemberg, Germany

Donaueschingen
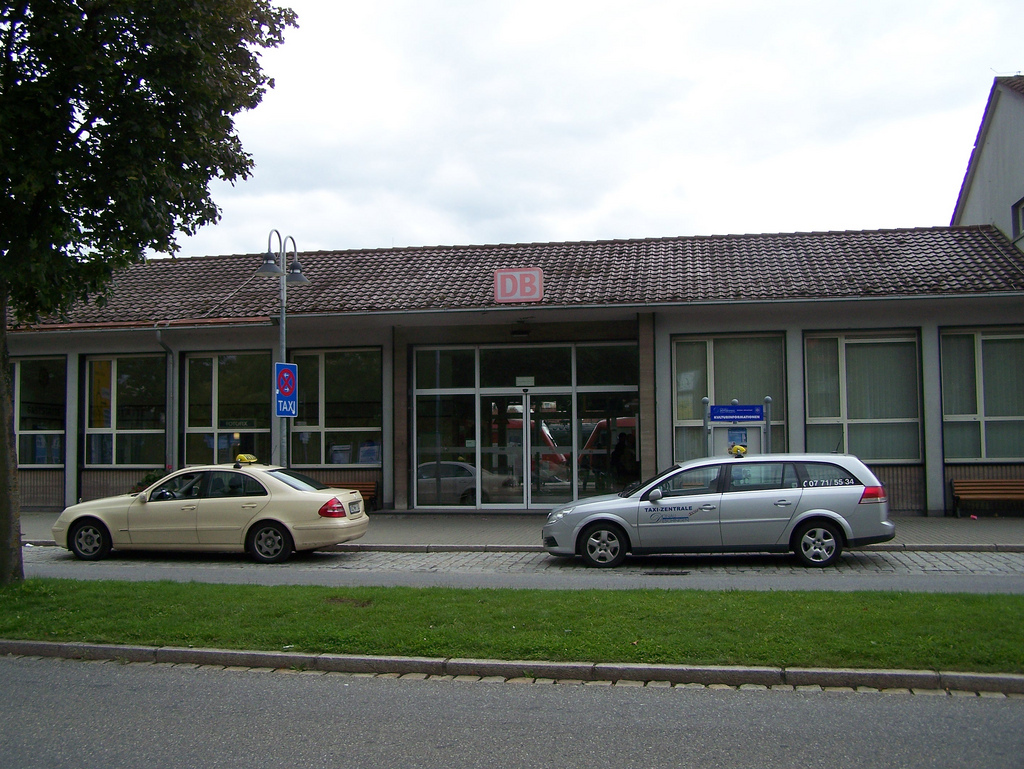

General information
- Location: Bahnhofstr. 1 Donaueschingen, Baden-Württemberg; Germany
- Coordinates: 47°56′52″N 8°29′56″E
- Elevation: 677 m (2,221 ft)
- Owner: DB Netz
- Operator: DB Station&Service
- Lines: Black Forest Railway (Baden) (99.8 km) (KBS 720); Freiburg–Donaueschingen (74.7 km) (KBS 727)
- Platforms: 5

Construction
- Accessible: Yes

Other information
- Station code: 1264
- DS100 code: RDO
- IBNR: 8000077
- Category: 4
- Fare zone: Move: 6
- Website: www.bahnhof.de

History
- Opened: 15 June 1868

Services
Preceding station	DB Regio Baden-Württemberg	Following station
Villingen (Schwarzwald) towards Karlsruhe Hbf	RE 2	Immendingen towards Konstanz
Villingen (Schwarzwald) Terminus	RE 55	Geisingen towards Ulm Hbf
Preceding station	(Offenburg)	Following station
Donaueschingen Mitte/Siedlung towards Rottweil	RB 42	Donaueschingen Allmendshofen towards Bräunlingen
Preceding station	Breisgau S-Bahn	Following station
Hüfingen Mitte towards Freiburg Hbf	S10	Villingen (Schwarzwald) Terminus
Location

Donaueschingen station is a junction station in the south of the German state of Baden-Württemberg. It is the only official Bahnhof (station) in the city of Donaueschingen. The city also has the Haltepunkte (halts, which is defined in Germany as a station having no sets of points) of Donaueschingen Allmendshofen, Donaueschingen Mitte/Siedlung, Donaueschingen Aufen and Donaueschingen Grüningen. The station is classified by Deutsche Bahn (DB) as a category 4 station and has five platform tracks. It is used daily by about 100 trains operated by DB long-distance, DB Regio and the Hohenzollerische Landesbahn.

== History ==
The station was opened on 15 June 1868 with the completion of the Black Forest Railway from Donaueschingen to Immendingen. On 6 August 1869, this was followed by the commissioning of the line from Donaueschingen to Villingen. On 18 October 1892, a railway line was completed to Hüfingen but renovations were required for the tracks to be connected to the station. Therefore, the tracks were upgraded and a Bahnmeisterei (office of the director of track maintenance) was built. In 1884, the station received a crane to make the loading of freight easier. In 1893, three new electro-mechanical interlockings were also put into operation. A freight hall was created in 1899 to handle increasing freight volumes. Additionally the engine house was extended. In 1901, the station had to be rebuilt because of the extension of the Höllentalbahn (Hell Valley Railway). In 1902, the old station building was replaced by a new one and in the same year it gained a fourth signal box. The remaining renovations were completed in 1910 with the reconstruction of the platform canopies lasting until 1912. The station was substantially destroyed in the Second World War, so a new station was opened in 1959.

== Description ==
The station is located south of central Donaueschingen. The station area is bounded in the south by Friedrich-Erbert-Straße and Güterstraße and in the north by Bahnhofstrasse. In the west and in the east there are bridges that cross the station precinct, the Schellenberg and the Bahnhofstrasse bridges. The station building is located on the north side of the tracks and its address is Bahnhofstraße 1. The building houses a travel centre, among other things.

The station has three platforms, some of which have barrier-free access for the disabled. The station is connected by a bus route.

=== Platform information ===
- Track 1: height 38 cm, length 245 metres
- Track 2: height 38 cm, length 245 metres
- Track 3: height 38 cm, length 245 metres
- Track 4: height 38 cm, length 130 metres
- Track 5: height 38 cm, length 130 metres

== Rail services ==
The station is served by one pair long-distance trains on the weekend to Emden, Dortmund and Konstanz. Services as of 2021 are as follows:

Line	Route	Frequency
IC 35	Schwarzwald: (Emden Hbf – Münster (Westf) Hbf –) Dortmund Hbf – Essen Hbf – Cologne Hbf – Koblenz Hbf – Karlsruhe Hbf – Offenburg – Villingen (Schwarzw) – Donaueschingen – Singen (Hohentwiel) – Konstanz	1 train pair (only on weekends)
RE 2	Karlsruhe – Baden-Baden – Achern – Offenburg – Villingen (Schwarzw) – Donaueschingen – Immendingen – Singen (Hohentwiel) – Konstanz	60 min
RE 7	(Triberg –) Villingen (Schwarzw) – Donaueschingen – Tuttlingen – Sigmaringen – Riedlingen – Schelklingen – Ulm	60/120 min
RB 42	Bräunlingen – Donaueschingen – Villingen (Schwarzw) – Schwenningen (Neckar) – Trossingen Bahnhof – Rottweil – Spaichingen – Tuttlingen – Immendingen – Blumberg-Zollhaus	60 min
S10	Villingen (Schwarzw) - Donaueschingen - Neustadt (Schwarzw) - Titisee - Freiburg	60 min
