= Spaichingen station =

Railway station in Spaichingen, Germany

Spaichingen
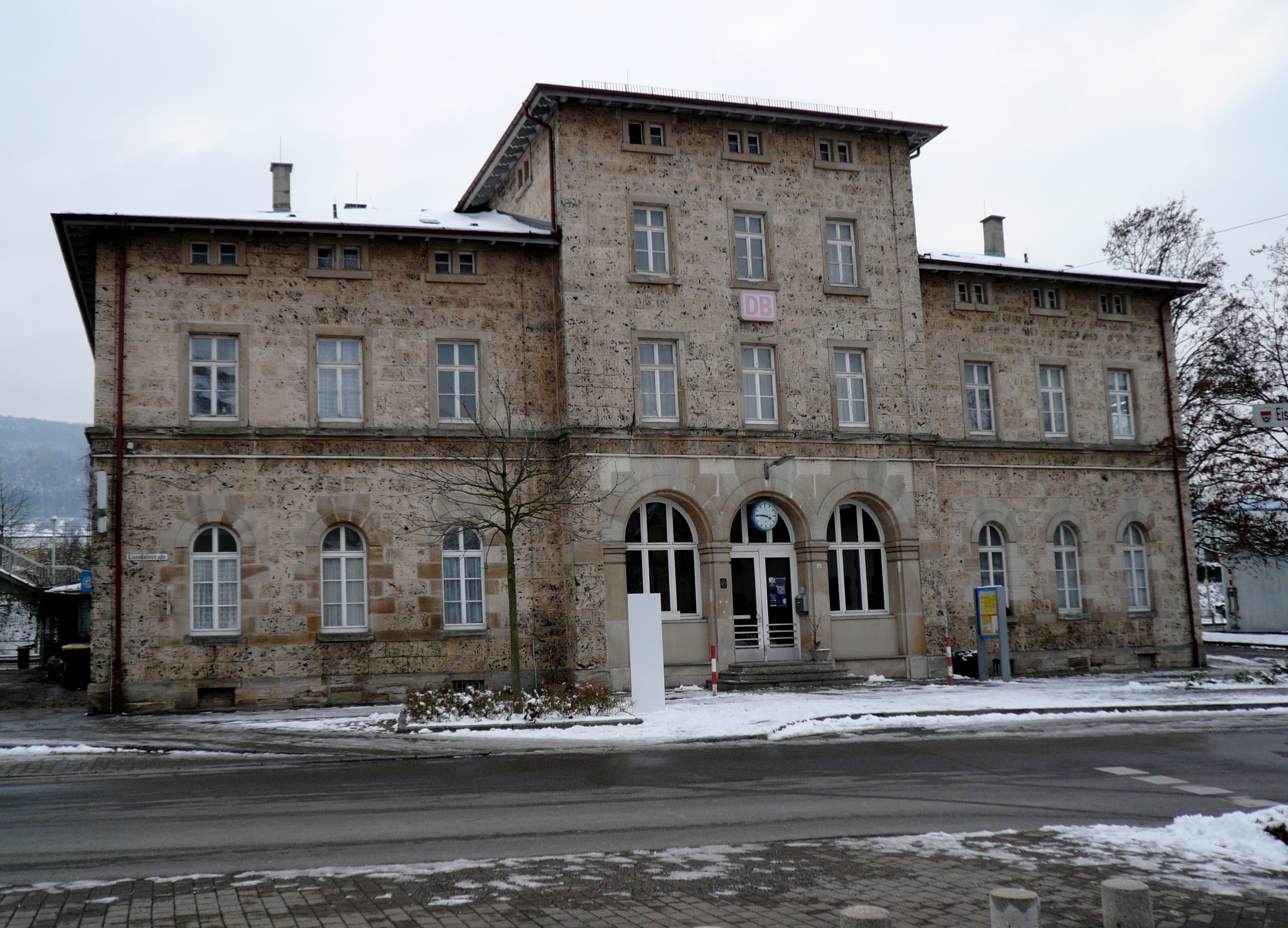
- Spaichingen station

General information
- Location: Eisenbahnstr. 35, Spaichingen, Baden-Württemberg; Germany
- Coordinates: 48°04′08″N 8°44′25″E
- Lines: Plochingen–Immendingen railway; Heuberg Railway until 1966
- Platforms: 3

Construction
- Accessible: No (except platform 1)

Other information
- Station code: 5916
- DS100 code: TSP
- IBNR: 8005616
- Category: 5
- Fare zone: Move: 7
- Website: www.bahnhof.de

History
- Opened: 15 July 1869

Services
Preceding station	DB Fernverkehr	Following station
Tuttlingen towards Zürich HB	IC 87	Rottweil towards Stuttgart Hbf
Preceding station	(Offenburg)	Following station
Tuttlingen towards Blumberg-Zollhaus	RB 43	Aldingen (b Spaichingen) towards Rottweil
Location

Spaichingen station is a station on the Plochingen–Immendingen railway in the German state of Baden-Württemberg.

== History ==
Spaichingen station was opened on 15 July 1869 with the Rottweil–Tuttlingen section of the extension of the Upper Neckar Valley Railway (Obere Neckarbahn), connecting Stuttgart, Plochingen, Tübingen, Horb and Rottweil. On 28 May 1928, Spaichingen became a railway junction with the opening of the Heuberg Railway to Reichenbach (Heuberg), 15 years after its groundbreaking ceremony. Until the line was closed in 1966, it connected Heuberg with Spaichingen, the seat of the Württemberg district (Oberamt) until its abolition in 1938. The station is situated on the southern edge of Spaichingen at 676 metres above sea level. It is located near Spaichingen Hauptstraße (main street), part of Bundesstraße 14. Spaichingen has three platform tracks for passenger services. In 1957, the station had a staff of 19 people. The station building is now unoccupied. Originally the station was 445 metres long and up to 74 meters wide. The complex included an office building and a goods shed, which was used as such until 1976 and demolished in 2011.

== Rail services ==
Since December 2017, Intercity line 87 have run hourly on the Plochingen–Immendingen line, replacing a Regional-Express service running Stuttgart between Singen and can therefore be used with local tickets. These stop in Spaichingen every two hours. Spaichingen is also served by hourly Ringzug services, which connects the town to Bräunlingen via Rottweil, Villingen and Donaueschingen. In the opposite direction, Blumberg-Zollhaus on the Swiss border can be reached via Tuttlingen and Immendingen.

Train class	Route
IC 87 / RE 87	Stuttgart – Böblingen – Herrenberg – Horb – Rottweil – Spaichingen – Tuttlingen – Singen (Hohentwiel)
RB 43	Rottweil – Spaichingen – Tuttlingen – Immendingen – Blumberg-Zollhaus

== Gallery ==
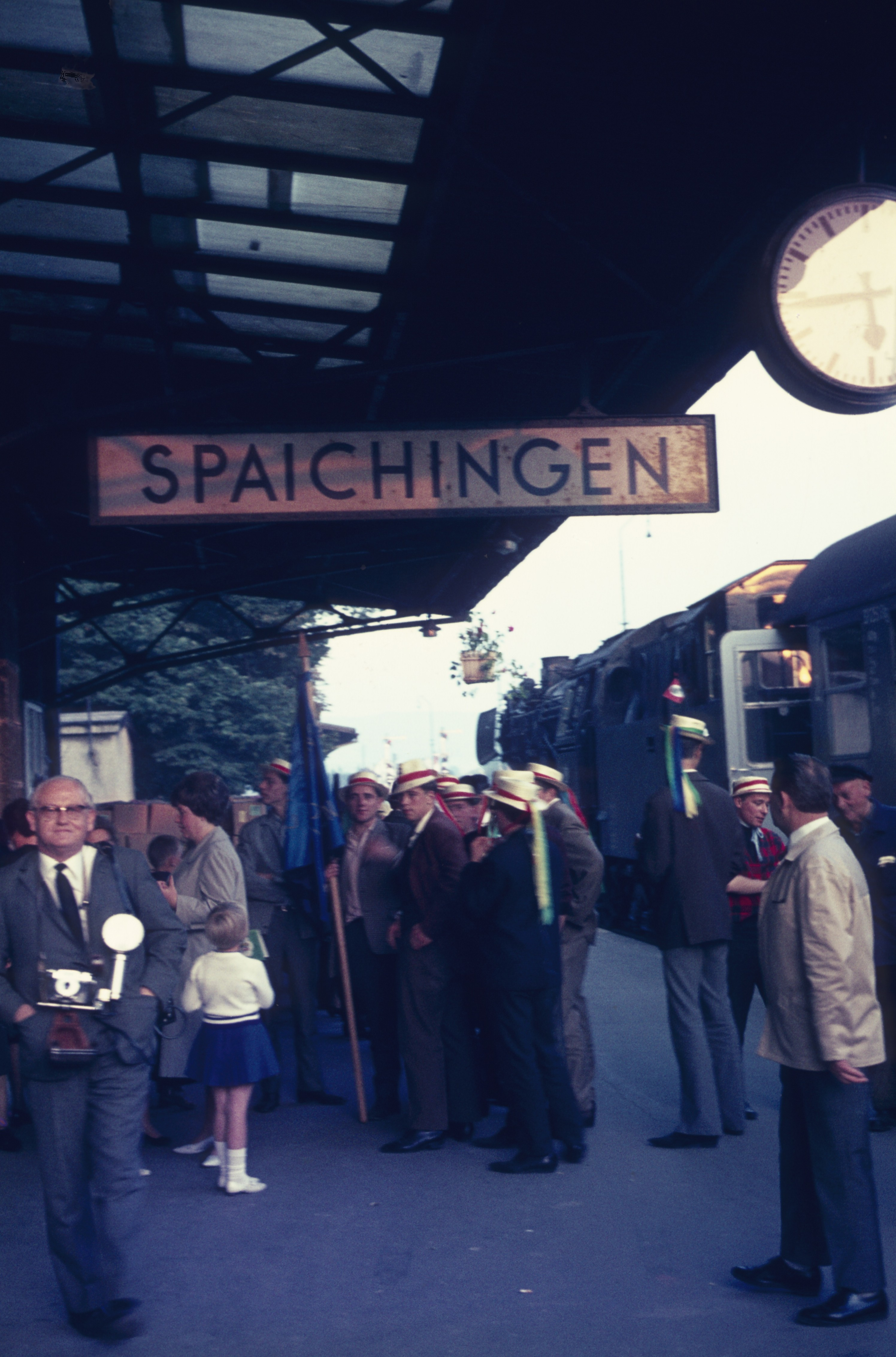
Last trip on the Heuberg Railway at platform 3 in 1966

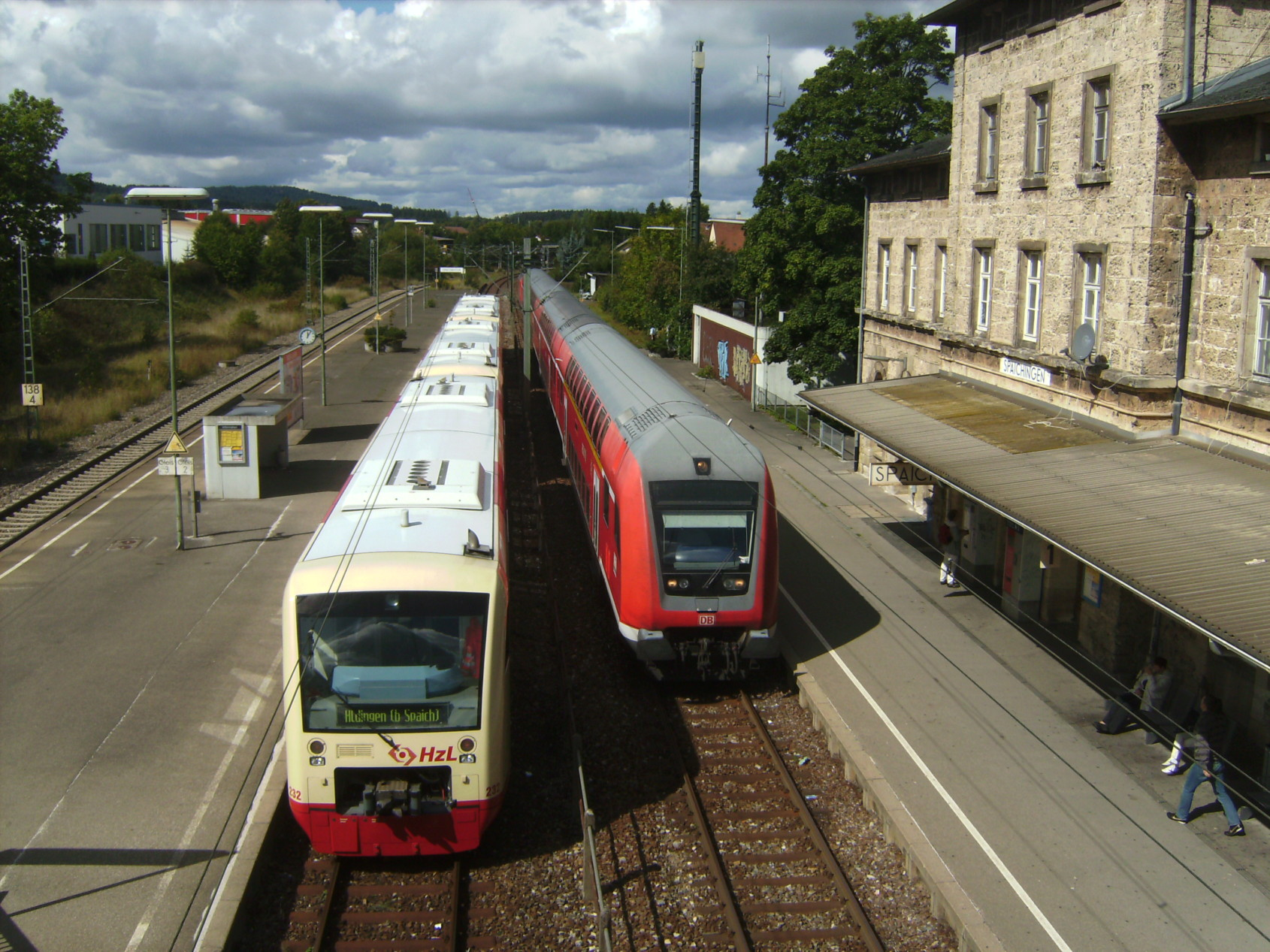
A Ringzug service to Aldingen and the Stuttgart-Singen Regional-Express service meet in Spaichingen
