= Rottweil station =

Start of the Rottweil–Villingen railway

Rottweil
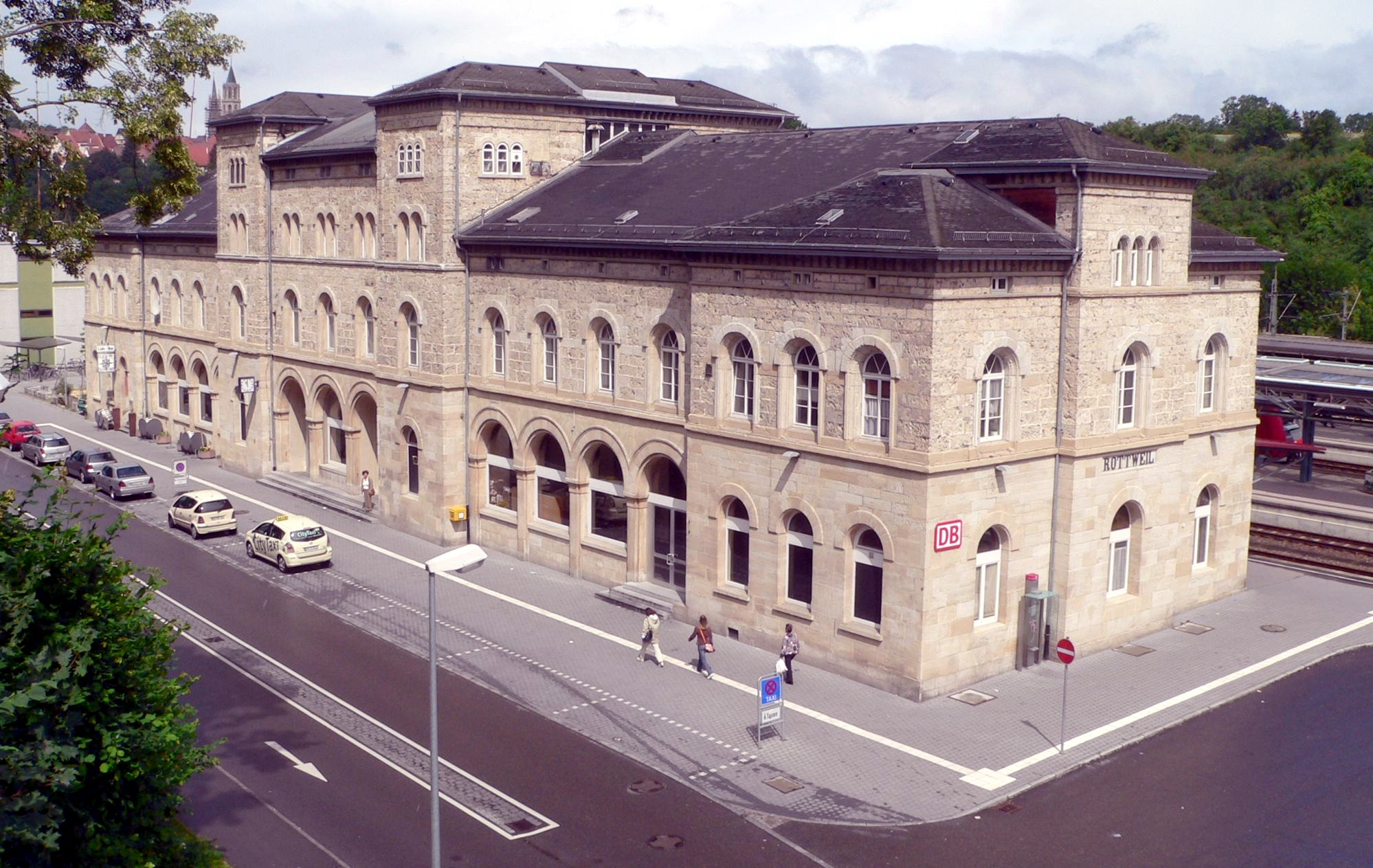

General information
- Location: Bahnhofstr. 1, Rottweil, Baden-Württemberg; Germany
- Coordinates: 48°9′53″N 8°38′30″E
- Lines: Plochingen–Immendingen railway; Rottweil–Villingen railway; until 1971: Balingen–Rottweil railway
- Platforms: 5

Construction
- Accessible: Yes

Other information
- Station code: 5405
- DS100 code: TR
- IBNR: 8000322
- Category: 3
- Fare zone: Move: 2/23; naldo: 620 (Move transitional zone)
- Website: www.bahnhof.de

History
- Opened: 23 July 1868
Services
Preceding station	DB Fernverkehr	Following station
Tuttlingen towards Zürich HB	IC 87	Horb towards Stuttgart Hbf
Spaichingen towards Zürich HB	IC 87	Oberndorf (Neckar) towards Stuttgart Hbf
Preceding station	DB Regio Baden-Württemberg	Following station
Tuttlingen towards Singen (Hohentwiel)	RE 4	Horb towards Stuttgart Hbf
Terminus	RE 14a	Sulz (Neckar) towards Stuttgart Hbf
Preceding station	(Offenburg)	Following station
Deißlingen Mitte towards Bräunlingen	RB 42	Terminus
Aldingen (b Spaichingen) towards Blumberg-Zollhaus	RB 43	Terminus
Location

Rottweil station is on the Plochingen–Immendingen railway in the German state of Baden-Württemberg and is the start of the Rottweil–Villingen railway. It lies on the northeastern edge of Rottweil at a height of 557 metres above sea level.

== History ==
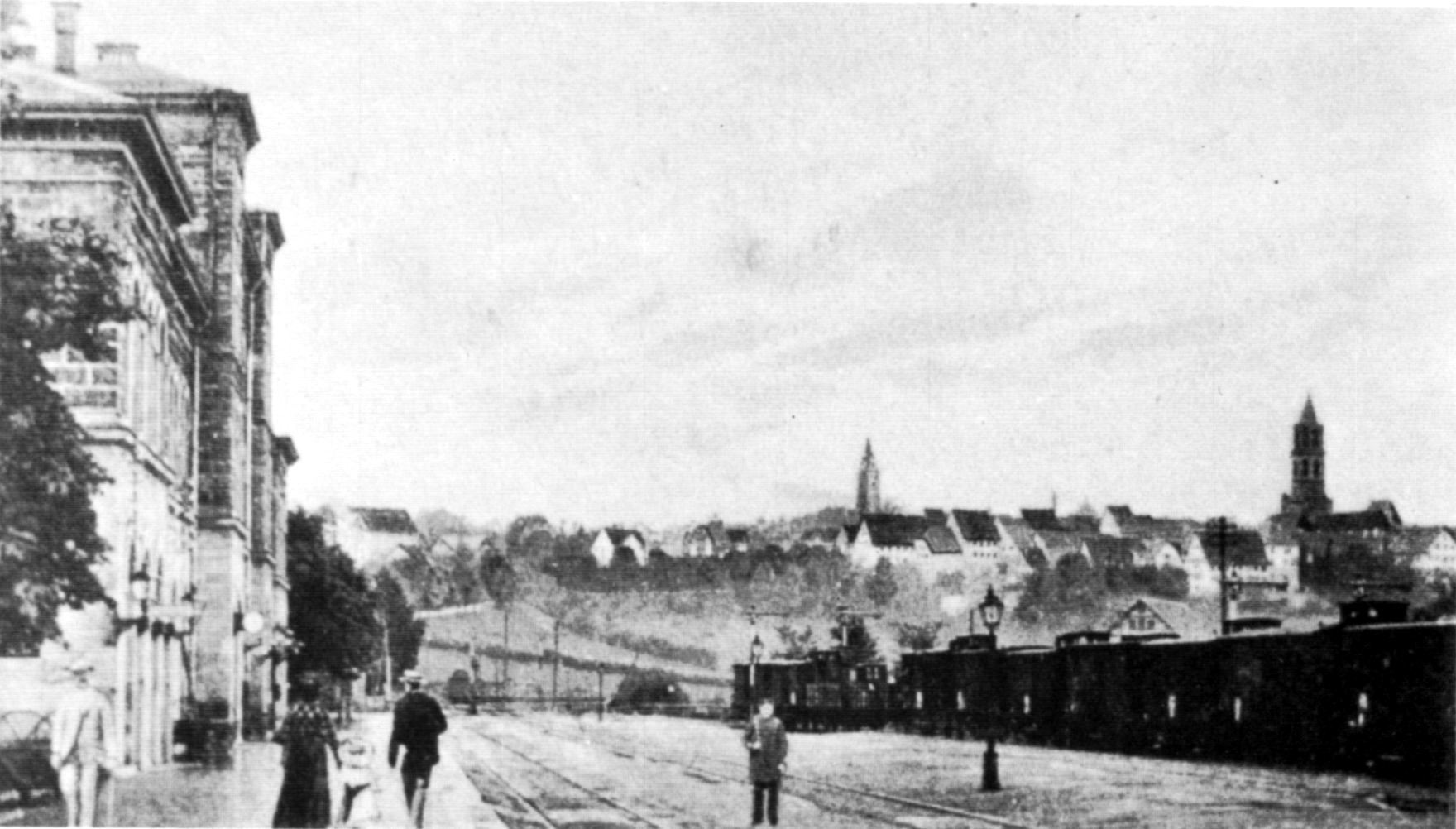
Rottweil station in 1900

Construction began in 1865. During the work, the remains of about 2,000 Russian soldiers were found. They had died about 50 years earlier in an epidemic. Their final resting place was in a mass grave on the grounds of the station. The station was opened on 23 July 1868.

Originally the station was 685 metres long and up to 162 metres wide. The complex included an administration building, a freight shed, two locomotive sheds and a repair shop.

On 11 August 1972, a freight train with 26 wagons derailed. Among other things, six tankers with caustic soda overturned, releasing 30,000 litres of caustic soda, but volunteer fire fighters prevented an oxyhydrogen explosion. No one was injured, and the damage amounted to about 750,000 Deutsche Mark.

== Significance ==
Rottweil station is at the junction of Rottweil–Villingen railway and the Gäu Railway. Regionalbahn and Regional-Express operate on the latter, with Intercity trains stopping every two hours in Rottweil. They were in the past supplemented by Intercity-Express and Cisalpino trains (the latter on the Stuttgart–Milan route). Parts of both lines form part of the Ringzug network that is operated by the Hohenzollern Landesbahn. Until 1971 Rottweil was also the terminus of the Balingen–Rottweil railway. In addition, the station is an important stop for urban and regional bus services.

== Rail services ==
The Stuttgart–Rottweil–Singen line IC 87 (RE 87) is served hourly. Part of the route can be used with regional tickets. Two pairs of train runs to/from Zürich.

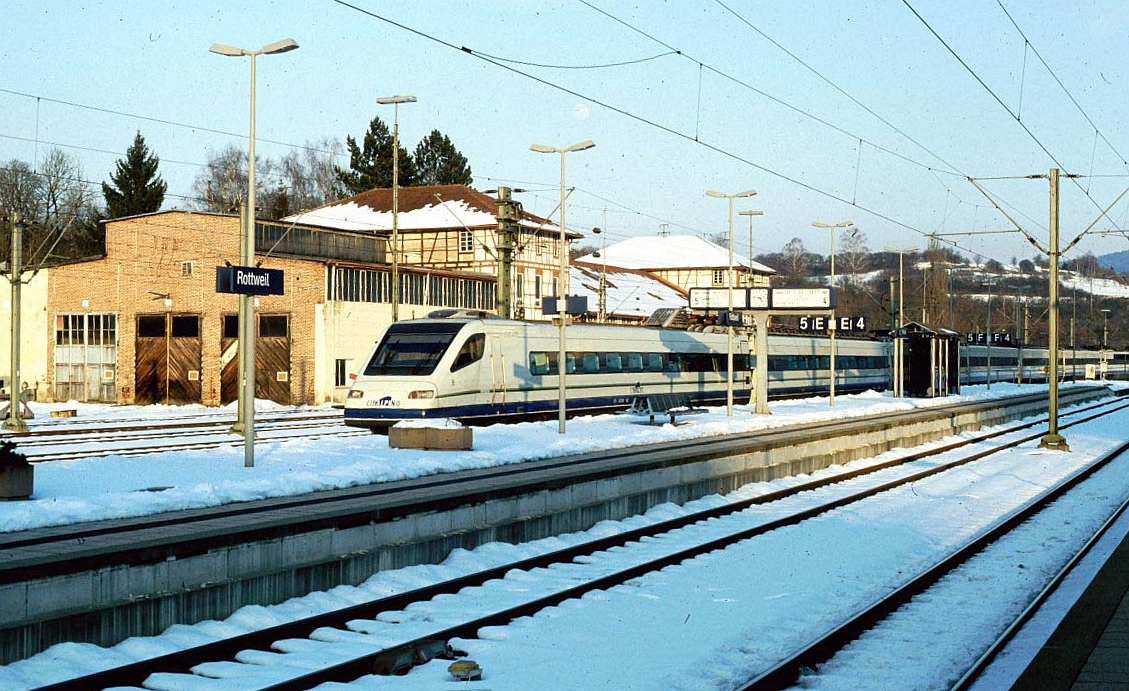
Cisalpino in Rottweil station, 2003

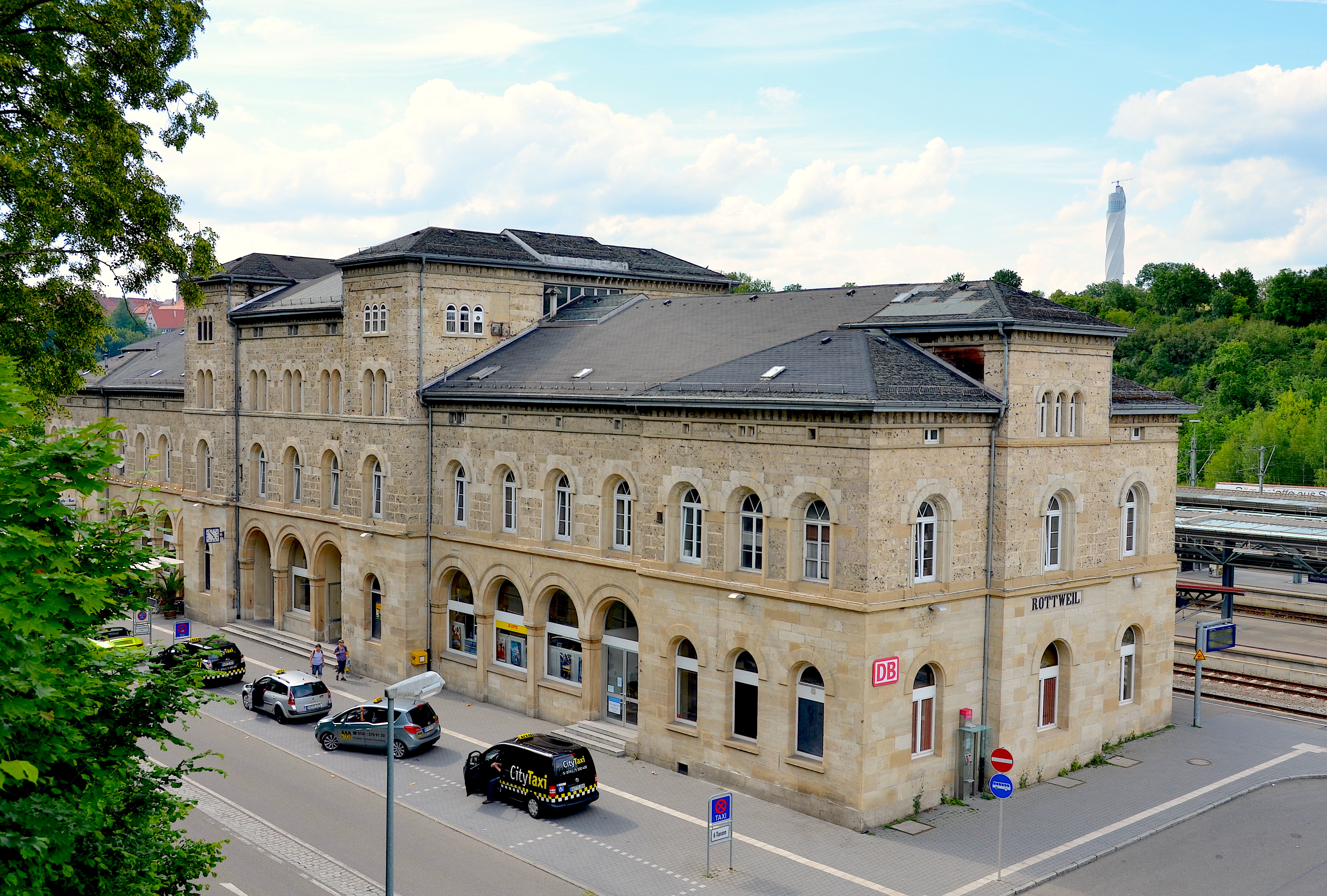
Rottweil station 2018 and ThyssenKrupp Test Tower in the background

Line	Route	Frequency
IC 87 / RE 87	Stuttgart – Böblingen – Herrenberg – Eutingen im Gäu – Horb – Rottweil – Tuttlingen – Singen (– Konstanz)	60 min
RE 4a	Stuttgart – Böblingen – Herrenberg – Horb – Rottweil – Tuttlingen – Singen	1 train pair
RE 4	Stuttgart – Böblingen (– Herrenberg ) – Horb – Rottweil – Tuttlingen – Radolfzell – Konstanz	2 train pairs
RE 14a	Stuttgart – Böblingen – Herrenberg – Eutingen – Horb – Rottweil	60 min
RB 42	Rottweil – Trossingen – Villingen – Donaueschingen – Bräunlingen	60 min
RB 43	Rottweil – Tuttlingen – Immendingen (– Blumberg-Zollhaus)	60 min

== Platforms ==
Rottweil has 5 platform tracks for passengers as well as several other tracks for freight. The platform tracks can be reached via a lift. On the platforms are covered shelters. The entrance building has a waiting room with lockers, a separate non-smoking waiting room and a ticket counter.

=== Others uses ===
The station building houses a newspaper kiosk and a café. In addition, there is a model railway in the 3rd floor of the building. It is operated by the Rottweiler Eisenbahn- und Modellbaufreunden (“Rottweil railway and model-building friends”) and is open to visitors.
