= Tuttlingen station =

Railway station in Tuttlingen, Germany

Tuttlingen
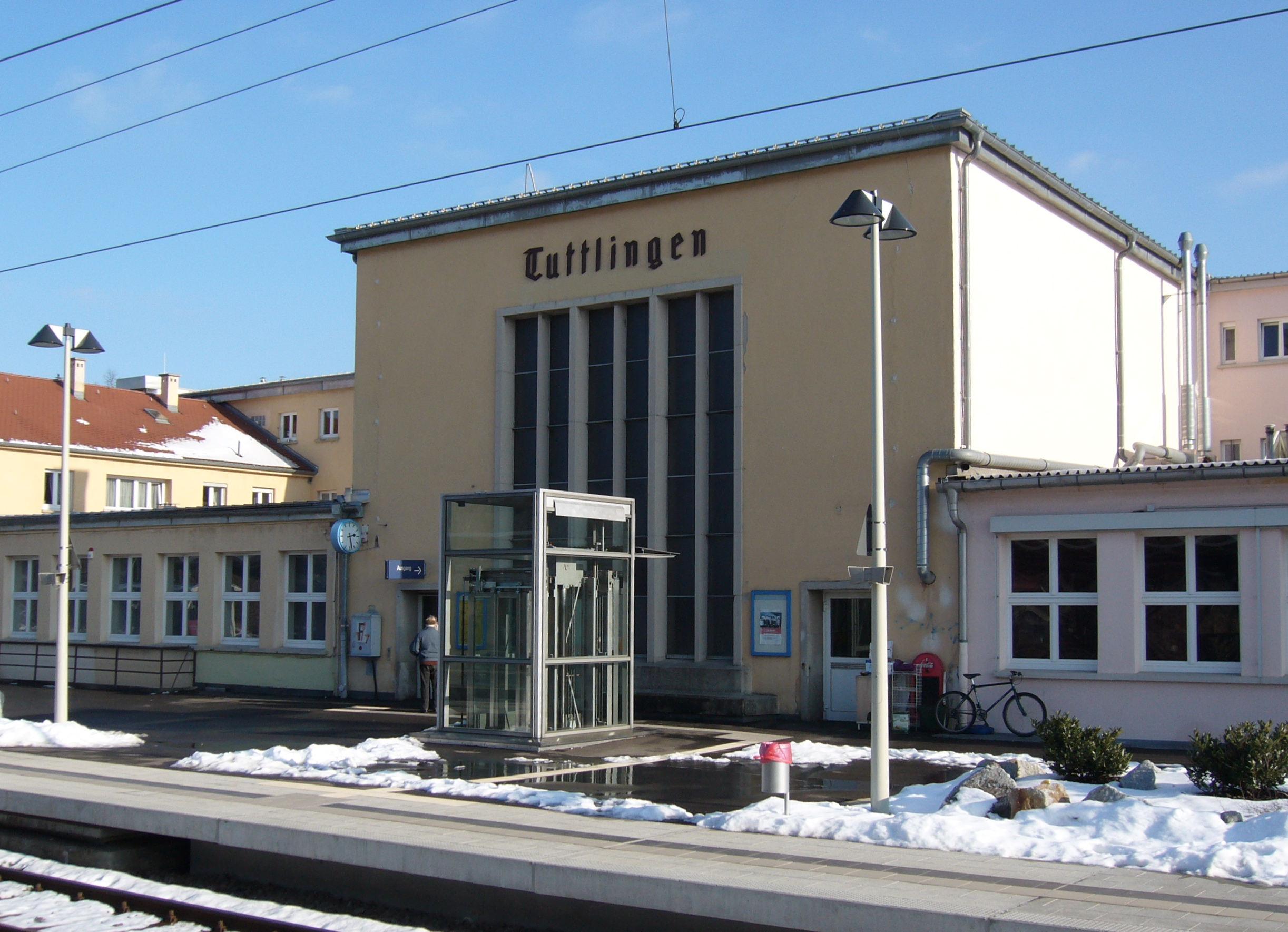
- View of track 1 and the entrance building

General information
- Location: Bahnhof 1, Tuttlingen, Baden-Württemberg; Germany
- Coordinates: 47°58′48″N 8°47′54″E
- Lines: Plochingen–Immendingen railway; Tuttlingen–Inzigkofen railway; Tuttlingen–Hattingen railway line
- Platforms: 5

Construction
- Accessible: Yes
- Architect: Construction office of the Stuttgart division of the Reichsbahn
- Architectural style: Modernism of Weimar period

Other information
- Station code: 6292
- DS100 code: TTU
- IBNR: 8000163
- Category: 3
- Fare zone: Move: 7 and 8
- Website: www.bahnhof.de

History
- Opened: 29 September 1933

Services
Preceding station	DB Fernverkehr	Following station
Singen (Hohentwiel) towards Zürich HB	IC 87	Rottweil towards Stuttgart Hbf
Engen towards Zürich HB	IC 87	Spaichingen towards Stuttgart Hbf
Preceding station	DB Regio Baden-Württemberg	Following station
Engen towards Singen (Hohentwiel)	RE 4	Spaichingen towards Stuttgart Hbf
Immendingen towards Villingen (Schwarzwald)	RE 55	Mühlheim (b Tuttlingen) towards Ulm Hbf
Preceding station	(Offenburg)	Following station
Tuttlingen Gansäcker towards Blumberg-Zollhaus	RB 43	Tuttlingen Schulen towards Rottweil
Tuttlingen Gansäcker towards Immendingen	RB 43a	Tuttlingen Zentrum towards Sigmaringen
Preceding station	SVG Stuttgart	Following station
Engen towards Konstanz	FEX Bodensee II	Horb towards Stuttgart Hbf
Location

Tuttlingen station is the most important of the eight railway stations in Tuttlingen in the German state of Baden-Württemberg. The station was built between 1928 and 1933 at a new location and replaced the original much smaller Tuttlingen station built in 1869. Tuttlingen station is a railway node at the intersection of the Plochingen–Immendingen railway and the Tuttlingen–Inzigkofen railway. The station is connected to the InterCity network and is one of the most important stations in the Ringzug ("Ring Train") network. It serves as the main hub for public transport in the Tuttlingen district.

== History ==
=== The station of 1869 ===
==== Tuttlingen connection to the railway ====
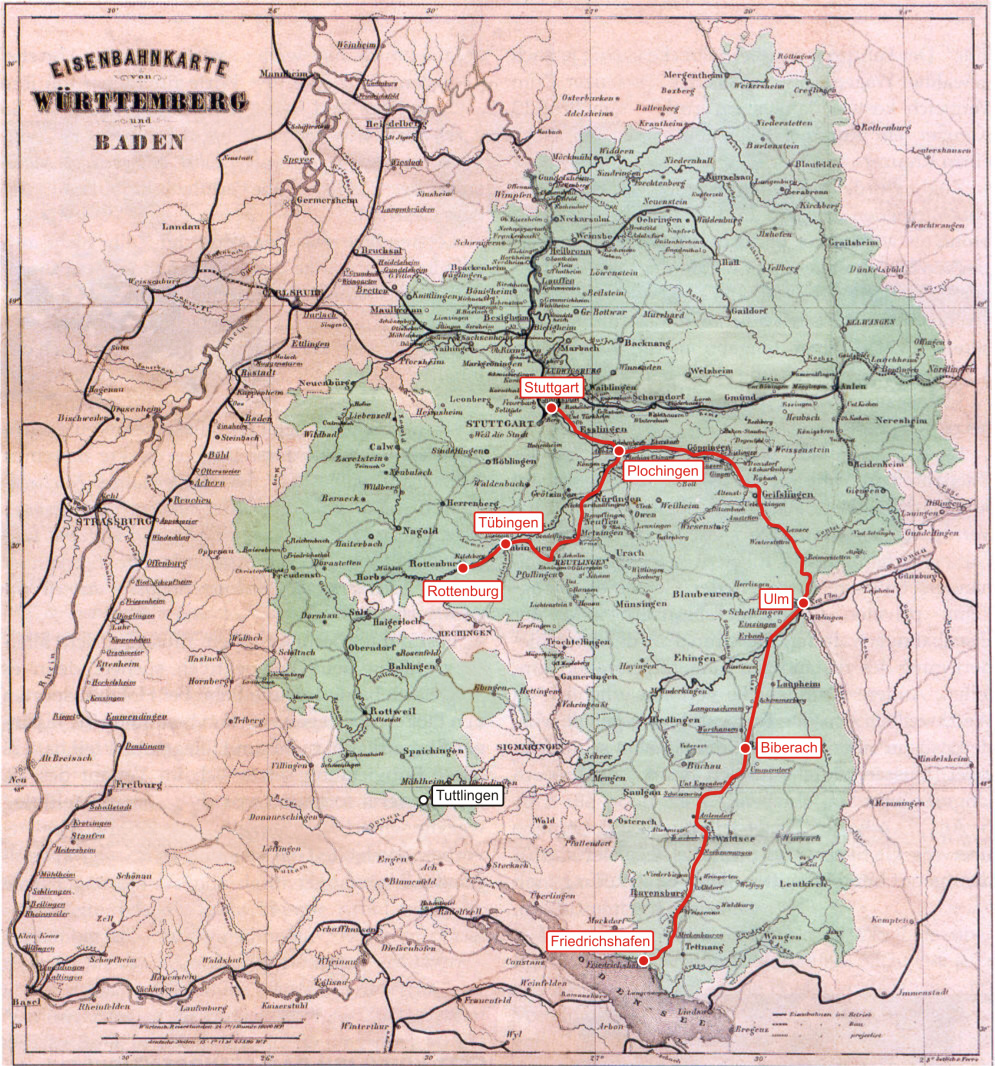
The location of Tuttlingen was well off the main railways of Württemberg and on the border with Baden. The extension from Plochingen southwest to Rottenburg am Neckar is already visible.

In the mid-19th century, Tuttlingen was near the border of the Grand Duchy of Baden in the south of the Kingdom of Württemberg. It was very conveniently situated on the so-called Swiss Post Road (Schweizer Poststraße), a major north–south road link from Stuttgart to the Swiss border near Schaffhausen. In 1797 Johann Wolfgang von Goethe passed on this busy road from Weimar via Tuttlingen to Switzerland. The construction of the main railways of Württemberg from 1844 to 1850 meant that the Swiss postal road lost its significance and Tuttlingen no longer had a convenient location. This only changed with the extension of the Württemberg rail network to Tuttlingen. In 1859, the Royal Württemberg State Railways started construction of the Upper Neckar Railway, leaving the main line at Plochingen towards Reutlingen and the Neckar valley to the southwest. The line was opened in stages to Tübingen, Rottenburg am Neckar and Horbm reaching Rottweil on 23 July 1868, where a line was under construction connecting to at the Black Forest Railway in Baden. This connecting line would run from Rottweil to Tuttlingen, where it was proposed that the line would continue to Immendingen in Baden. The Baden State Railway was also building the Black Forest Railway to Immendingen at this time. The line to Tuttlingen was opened on 15 July 1869, connecting it to the railway network the first time, restoring the convenient position it had lost two decades ago.

==== Impact of the station building to the Urban Development ====
The first Tuttlingen station was located near the current roundabout at Aesculap-Platz, at the intersection of federal highways 14 and 311 just outside the settlement and off the road network at the time. The reason for this comparatively unfavourable location was that the railway was primarily intended as a connecting line to the Black Forest Railway and the topography made it difficult to put the station closer to the centre of the town. The line follows the Prim, the Faulenbach and the Elta rivers from Rottweil to the south and passes west of Tuttlingen to reach the valley of the Danube to connect with the Black Forest Railway at Immendingen station. The original settlement of Tuttlingen, however, was entirely east of the confluence of the Elta and the Danube so line ran west of Tuttlingen and the station had to be built well outside of the built up area of the town. The town extended the street then called Poststraße (post street) from Rathausplatz to the distant station. The street that at first mainly ran through fields and meadows became the central axis between the town centre and the station and was consequently renamed Bahnhofstraße (station street). The construction of Bahnhofstraße required the straightening of the Danube, which originally flowed in the area of present-day Stadtgarten (town park). The connection to the railway was also one of the reasons for the strong growth of Tuttlingen, which now extends mainly to the west towards the station. In 1867, two years before the opening of the railway, Tuttlingen had 7,031 inhabitants; by 1883 it had grown to 8,343 residents and in 1900 it had 13,530 inhabitants. As a result of the construction of the railway, the emerging Tuttlingen company of Jetter und Scheerer (now Aesculap AG) settled in the developing station area, where it was easily accessible for commuters and the commodities it produced could easily be transported by train. The rail connection played an important role in the industrial development of Tuttlingen; it had previously been based largely on agriculture and trade.

==== Development of rail connections to Tuttlingen up to 1890 ====
The ride from Tuttlingen station to Stuttgart initially took about eight hours (today the IC service takes about an hour and 25 minutes), which was partly a result of the indirect route via Horb, Tübingen and Plochingen. A relatively direct route from Tuttlingen to Stuttgart was created with the completion of the Gäu Railway (Gäubahn), that is the railway from Freudenstadt via Eutingen im Gäu to Stuttgart in 1879. Tuttlingen was not yet connected to the east by rail: the initial section of the Danube Valley Railway (Donautalbahn) from Ulm, completed in 1873, only extended as far as Sigmaringen. Further construction, starting in 1887 only under pressure from the German General Staff, extended the line to Tuttlingen for strategic military purposes. This was completed in 1890, making Tuttlingen station a railway junction and an interchange: there was now a direct connection to Ulm, Stuttgart and Immendingen via the Black Forest Railway. A connection to Singen ran only indirectly via Immendingen, where trains needed to reverse.

=== The station of 1933 ===
==== Background: the development of the Gäu Railway ====
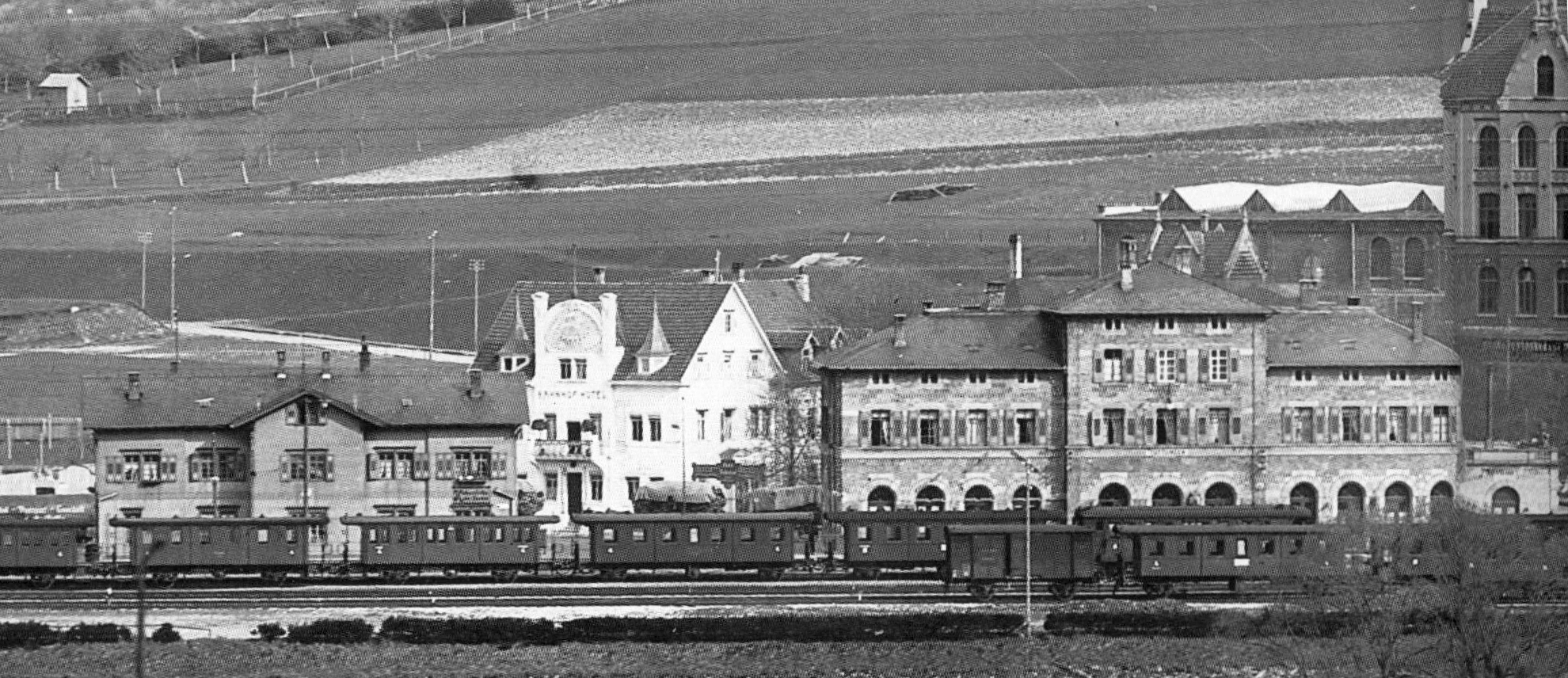
Tuttlingen station in 1908

After the First World War, the Free People's State of Württemberg sought to expand its railways. For economic reasons, Württemberg was interested in ensuring that the traffic from Berlin to Switzerland ran through its territory and not only through the neighbouring states of Bavaria and Baden. Württemberg sought to upgrade its part of the railway line from Berlin to Zurich via Würzburg, Stuttgart and Tuttlingen. To this end, it entered into an agreement with Deutsche Reichsbahn on 23 February 1927, which resulted in several upgrading projects, including the construction of a new station in Tuttlingen. It was envisaged that the Gäu Railway would be fully duplicated between Stuttgart and Tuttlingen. The Gäu Railway would no longer continue from Tuttlingen to Immendingen, connecting to the Black Forest railway. Rather, it was planned to build a direct north–south line from Stuttgart to the German-Swiss border at Singen. Tuttlingen would be connected by a single-track 8.2 km long line (called the Hattinger Kurve—“Hattingen curve”), leading via Hattingen to the Black Forest Railway, so that the traffic from Stuttgart to Switzerland would no longer need to operate over the detour via Immendingen.

==== Construction of the new station 1928–1933 ====
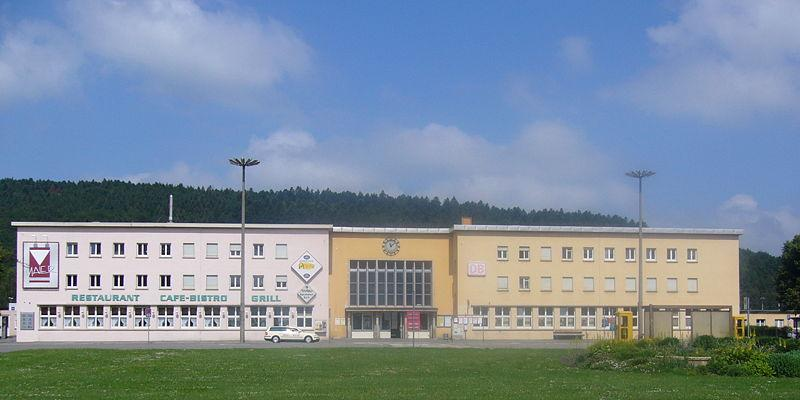
View of the new entrance building

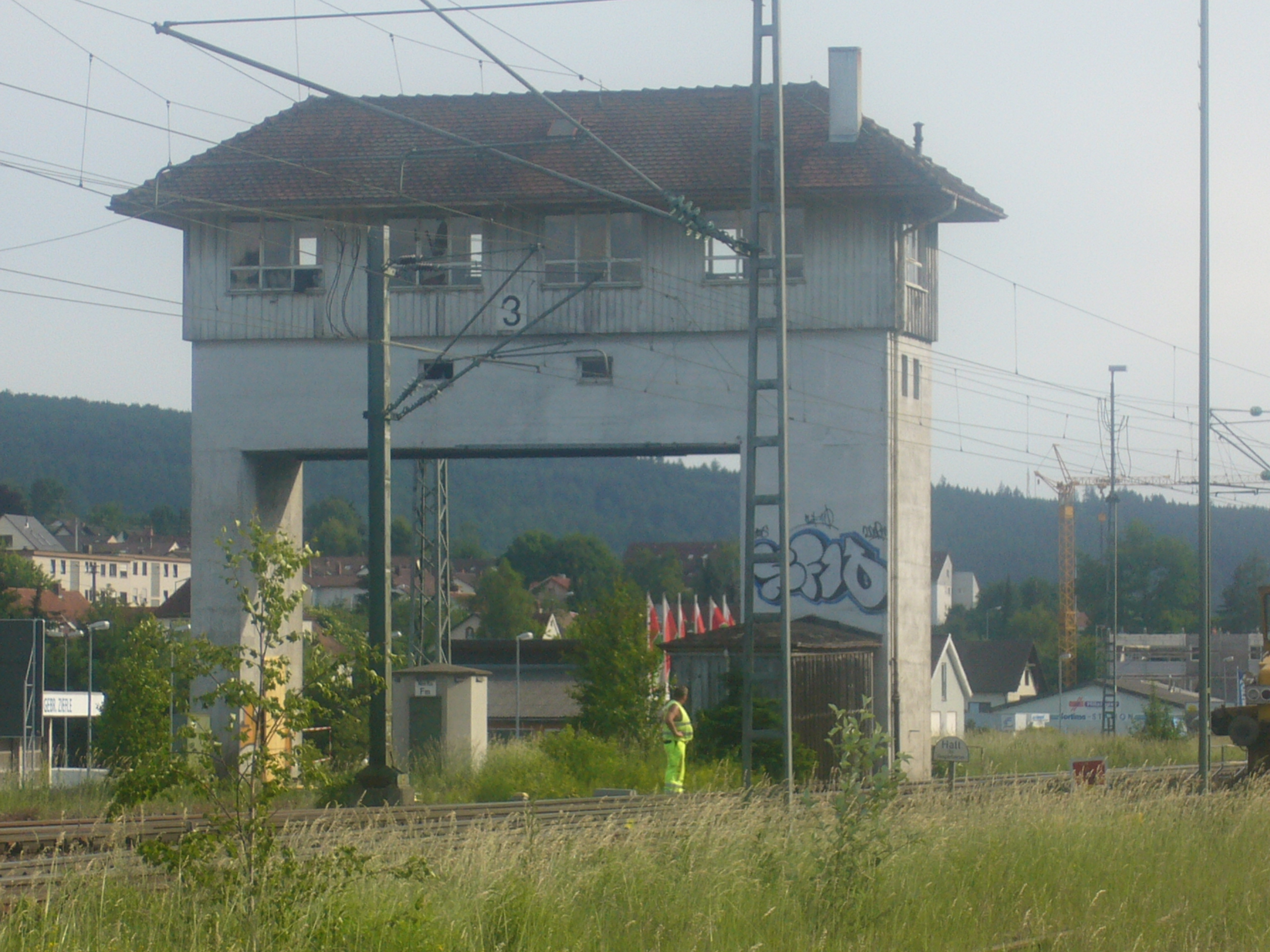
Former entrance to the station

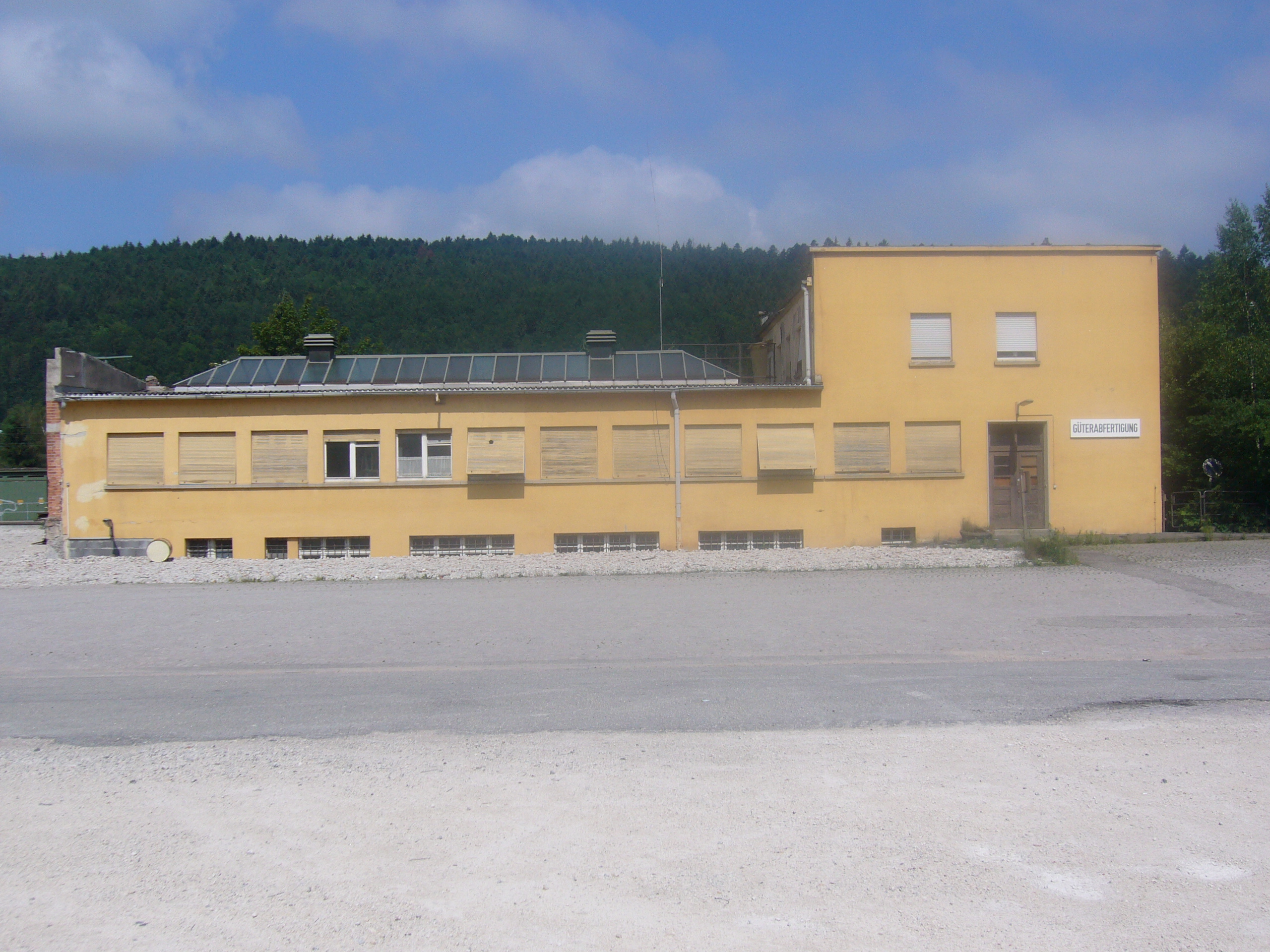
Freight terminal building

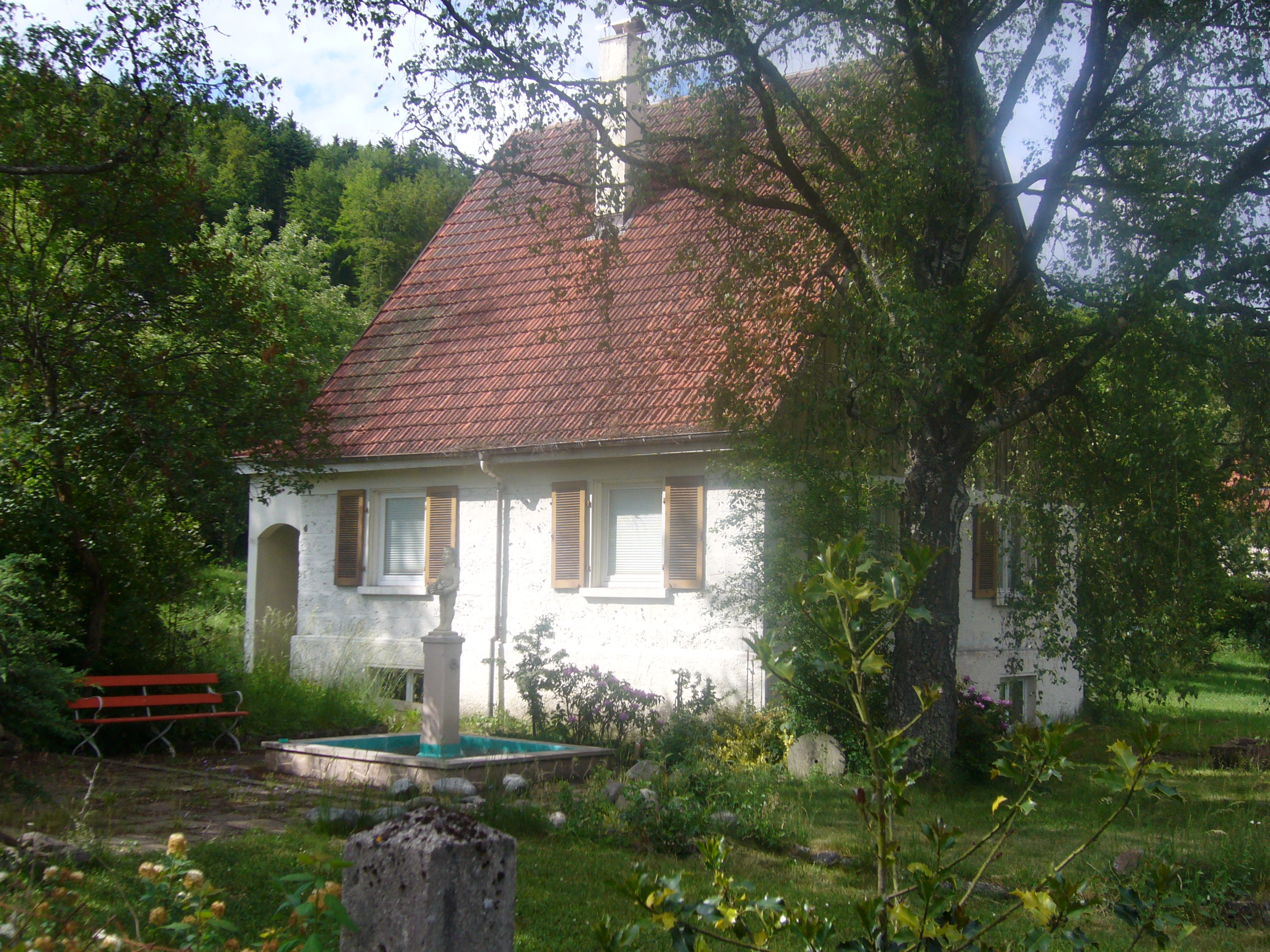
Residence in the Koppenland district, which was built in the 1930s out of material from the demolished station building

In the 1920s, the 1869 station had already reached the limit of its capacity. An extension of the old station was not possible due to its location, wedged between the Danube, the Ehrenberg (hill) and Weimarstraße. The planned installation of a second track to Stuttgart in conjunction with the new line to Hattingen was not possible at the old site. The Reichsbahn railway division (Reichsbahndirektion) of Stuttgart, which was entrusted with the work, thus decided, to build a new station on the other side of the Danube, another 200 metres further away from the centre, where there was enough room for the development of the station. The bed of the Danube was moved for about 2 km in the district of Koppenland and the level of the new railway station area was raised with excavated material sourced from 4 km away in the Hölzle forest of the Wurmlingen district.

Alfred Nägele was in charge of the construction of the new station for the railway division of Stuttgart. The installation of the track began in the spring of 1932. These and other parts of the station infrastructure crossed the border into Baden, so that the station was partly in Württemberg and partly in Baden. The station had eight tracks and sidings, a roundhouse, a freight terminal building and a turntable. During the construction of the station provision was made in various places for possible future expansion of the station, which, however, never came about. The station buildings were designed by the construction office of the railway division of Stuttgart. They are in the style of the late 1920s, in the modernist style of the Weimar Republic. A special feature was the flat roof of the entrance building, which is quite unusual for Tuttlingen architecture. The station building is three stories high and was at the time of the construction one of the biggest railway buildings in Württemberg. Although the building had been planned by the railway administration in Stuttgart before the Nazi seizure of power, there are also similarities with monumental Nazi architecture. Tuttlingen station building still remains as the largest railway building in the region and is oversized for a city the size of Tuttlingen.

An average of 280 workers found employment daily at Tuttlingen station during the 1928–1933 construction period, representing a huge relief for the local labour market, which had been battered by the global economic crisis. Overall, the new station required 20,000 m^{3} of concrete and 900 tons of steel and led to the building of 24.6 kilometres of track. The total cost of the station construction amounted to 9 million Reichsmarks (equivalent to 42 million 2021 euros).

The station was officially opened on 29 September 1933. The form of the celebration was strongly influenced by Nazi propaganda. One of the speeches was given by the President and Nazi Gauleiter of Württemberg Wilhelm Murr. In addition, the director of the Reichsbahn railway division in Stuttgart also spoke. He blamed the delay in completing the new building on its high cost. The delay was caused by the austerity program, which had been imposed on rail operations in Württemberg.

The facilities of the old station, which were no longer used, were dismantled in the months after the opening of the new station. The station building was demolished and the stones used in part to build a house. In May 1934, the construction of a single-track new line to Hattingen was completed. The completion of the duplication of the Gäu Railway was never completed. Work ended in 1941 during the Second World War. The section from Oberndorf to Aistaig therefore remained as a single track, along with the new section from Tuttlingen to Hattingen.

==== War damage in 1945, reparations and conversion to diesel power ====
Of the five Allied air raids in Tuttlingen in February and March 1945, four were mainly on the railway infrastructure. The west wing of the station building, the freight yard, the locomotive depot and the railway tracks were damaged severely. After the surrender of Tuttlingen in May 1945, civilian rail traffic came to a complete standstill in June 1945. As the German army had blown up many bridges over the Danube in the last days of the war, the Danube Valley Railway was not completely reopened until 1950. Trains in the French occupation zone did not initially operate to Tuttlingen. It was not until 1948 that trains ran from Tuttlingen to Stuttgart and Zurich. The direct services from Tuttlingen to Berlin that operated on the Gäu Railway from 1928 to 1941 were never restored. It was not until 1957 that the last war damage was repaired at Tuttlingen station.

In 1946, the French occupation forces removed as reparations one of the tracks of the Gäu Railway between Tuttlingen and Horb am Neckar, which had been duplicated only a few years earlier. Since then, Tuttlingen has only been connected by single-track lines in all directions. Between 1955 and 1969, all services through Tuttlingen were converted from steam to diesel operations.

==== Electrification, restoration and sale of railway facilities since the 1960s ====
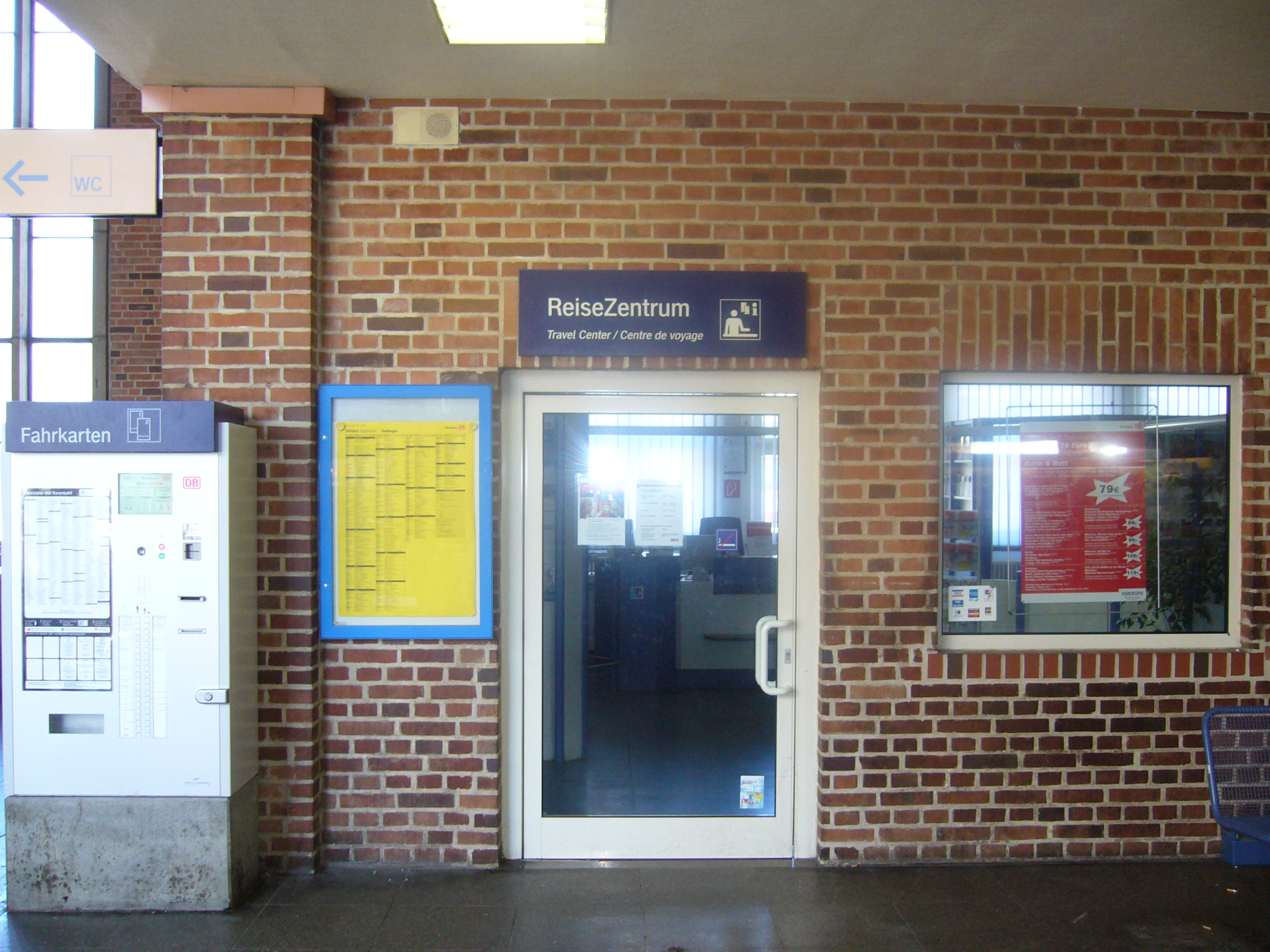
The travel centre opened in 1995

In 1977, Deutsche Bundesbahn electrified the Gäu Railway, reducing the travelling time from Stuttgart and Zurich. The Danube Valley Railway is still diesel-operated.

Since the 1960s, there have been numerous restoration projects at Tuttlingen station, which had been designed for a possible extension during its construction at the beginning of the 1930s. Of the original eight tracks, five are currently still in operation. With the closure of freight operations the freight tracks and many sets of points have been dismantled. In 1992, Deutsche Bundesbahn sold the freight yard site to the city of Tuttlingen and the roundhouse site to a railway enthusiast. Also in 1992, DB sold the west wing of the station building to an insurance broker, who then renovated it and rented part of it. The east wing, which was retained by DB was fundamentally renewed in 1994. A renovation of the facade, as has been done on the west wing, was not carried out, however. DB closed the luggage counter in 1995, but in the same year established a travel centre.

== The station today ==
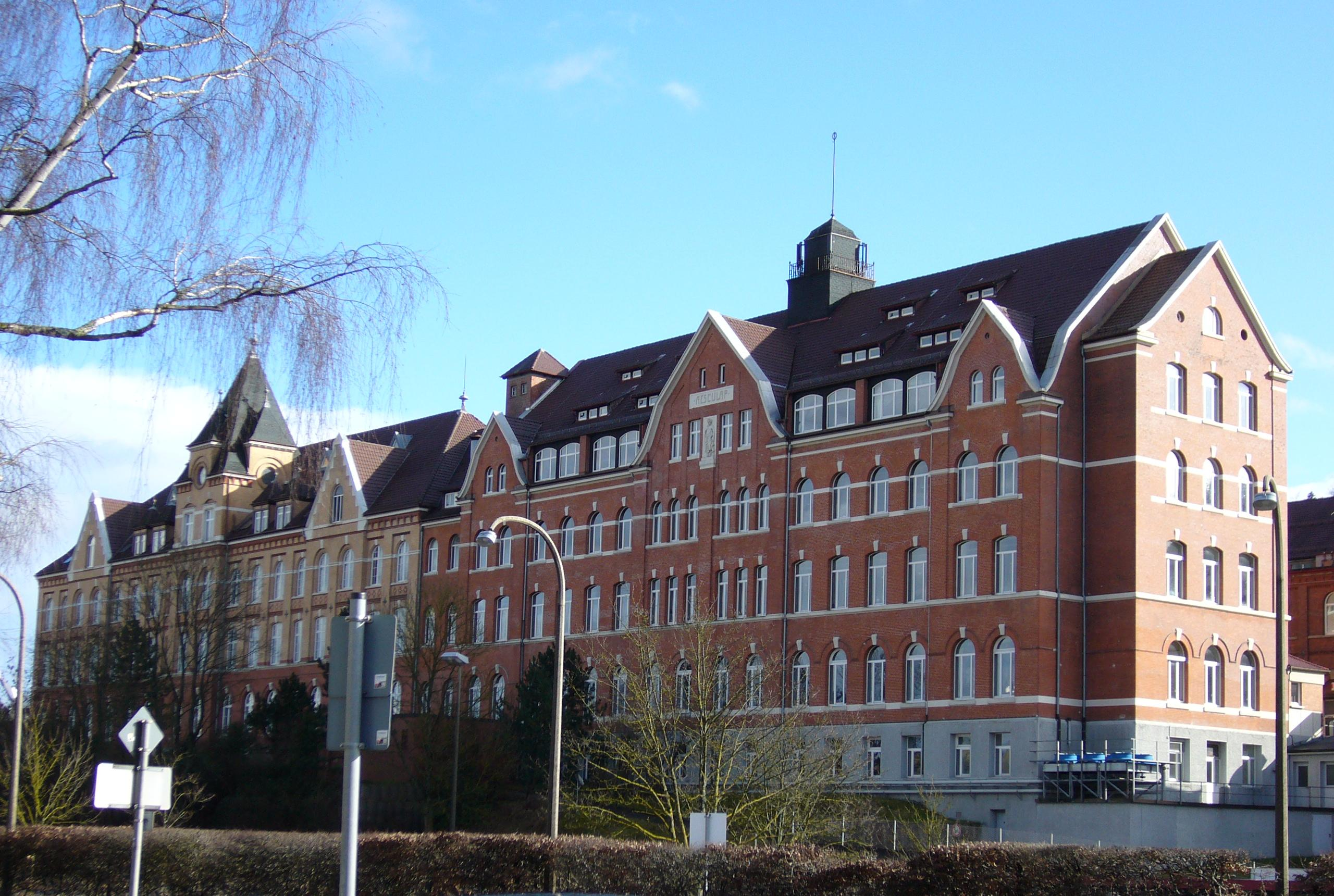
The Aesculap firm seen from the station forecourt

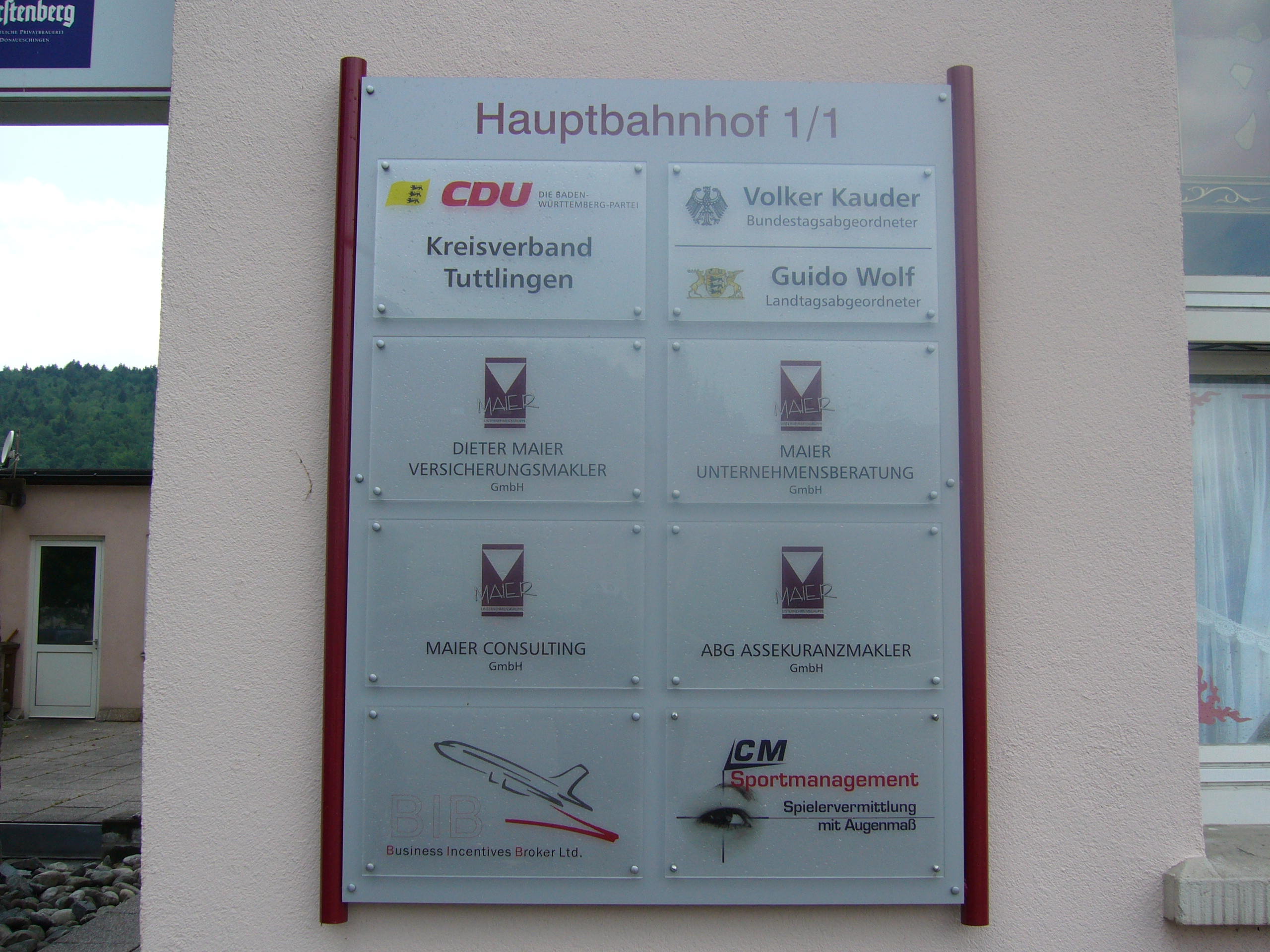
The constituency office of Volker Kauder and Guido Wolf in the station building

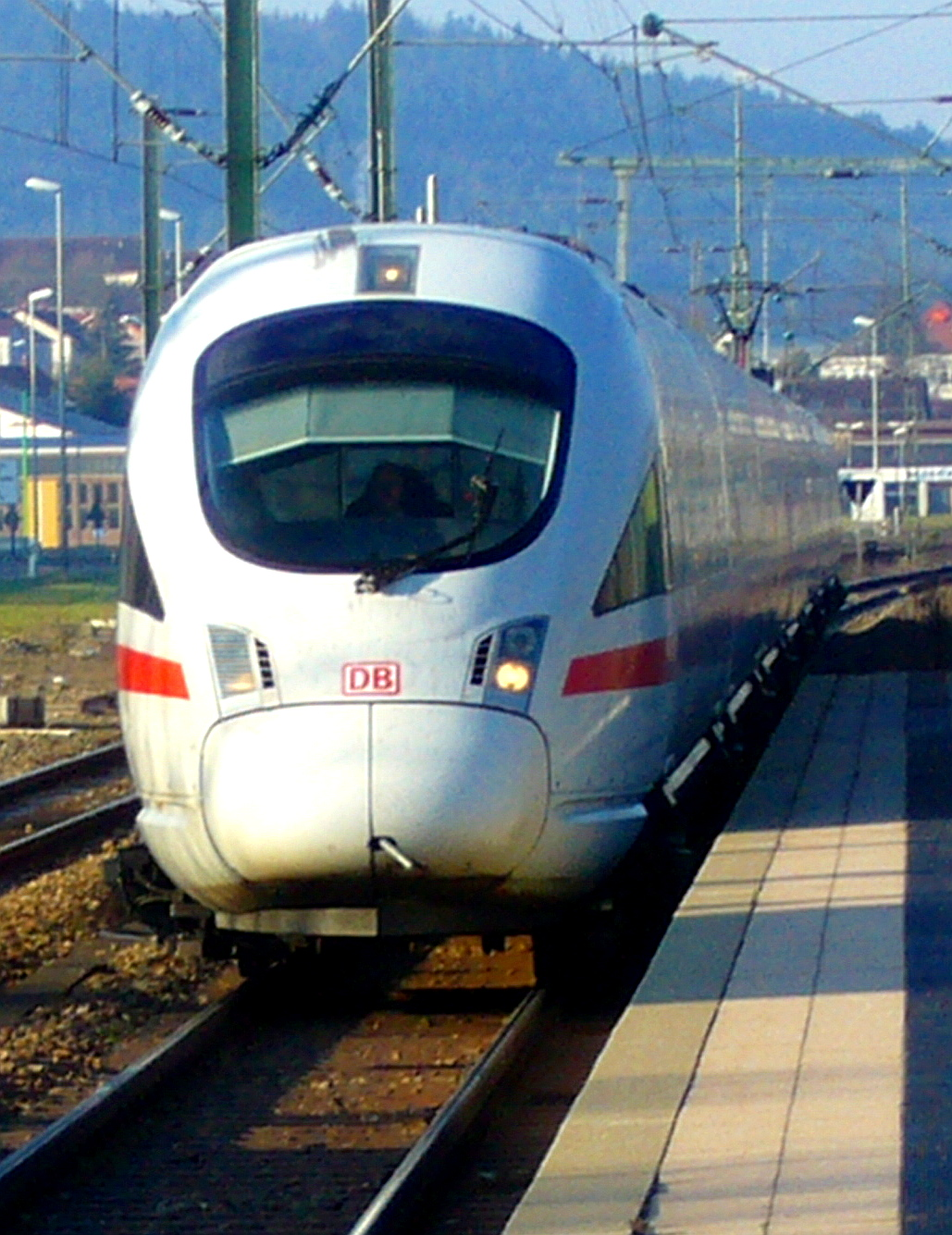
Intercity-Express in Tuttlingen station

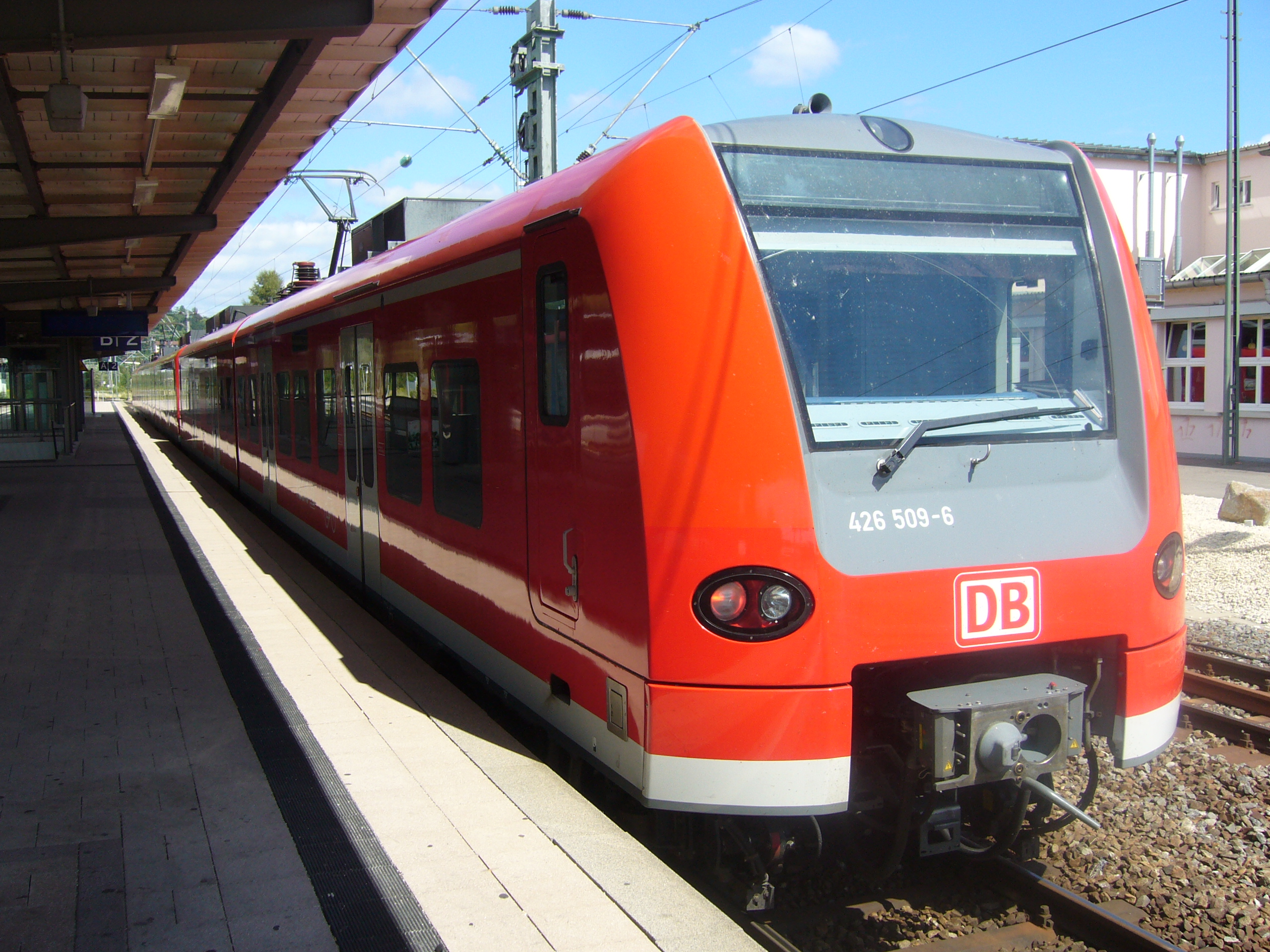
Regional-Express on the Plochingen–Immendingen railway in Tuttlingen station

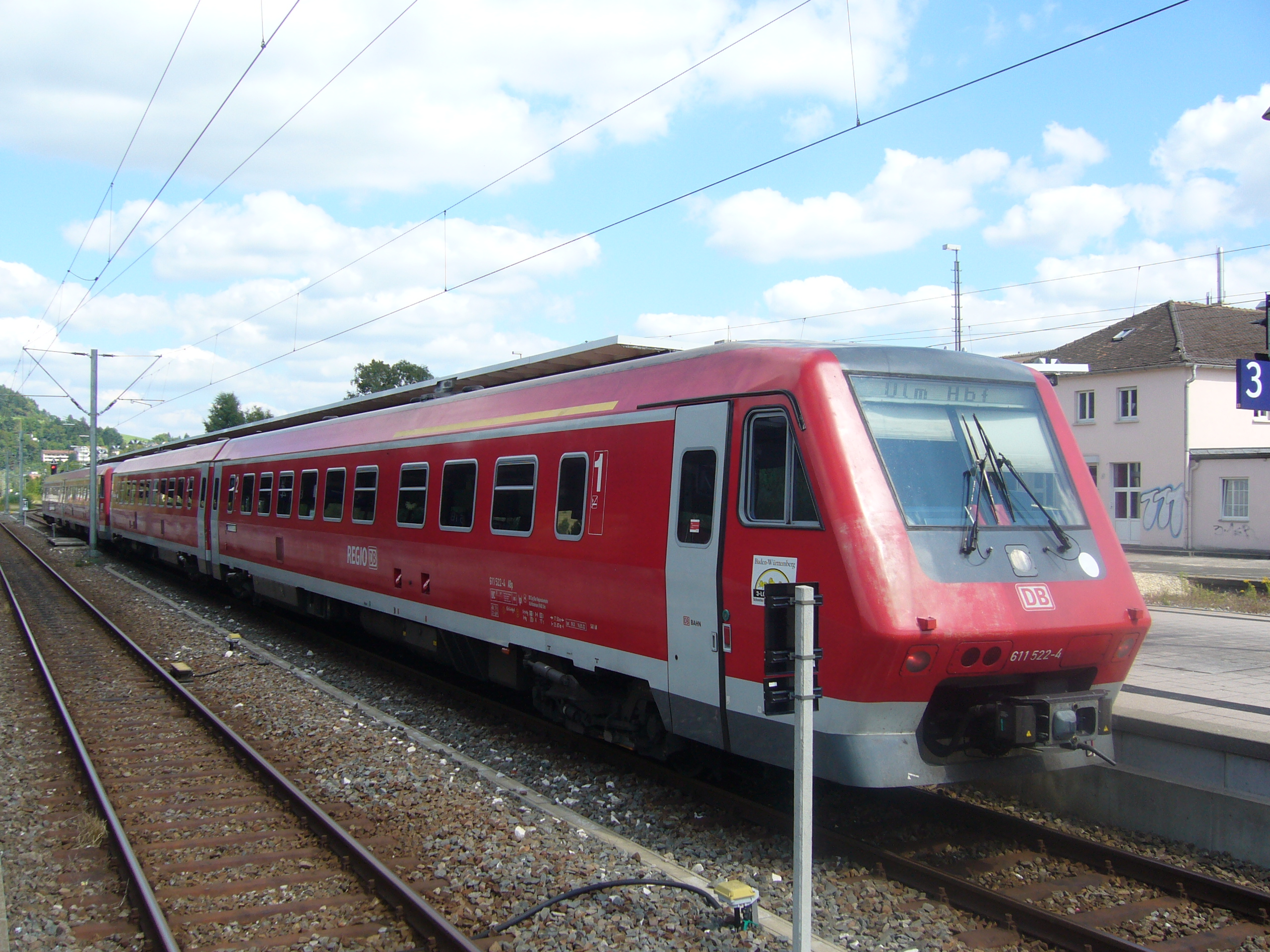
Regional-Express on the Tuttlingen–Inzigkofen railway in Tuttlingen station

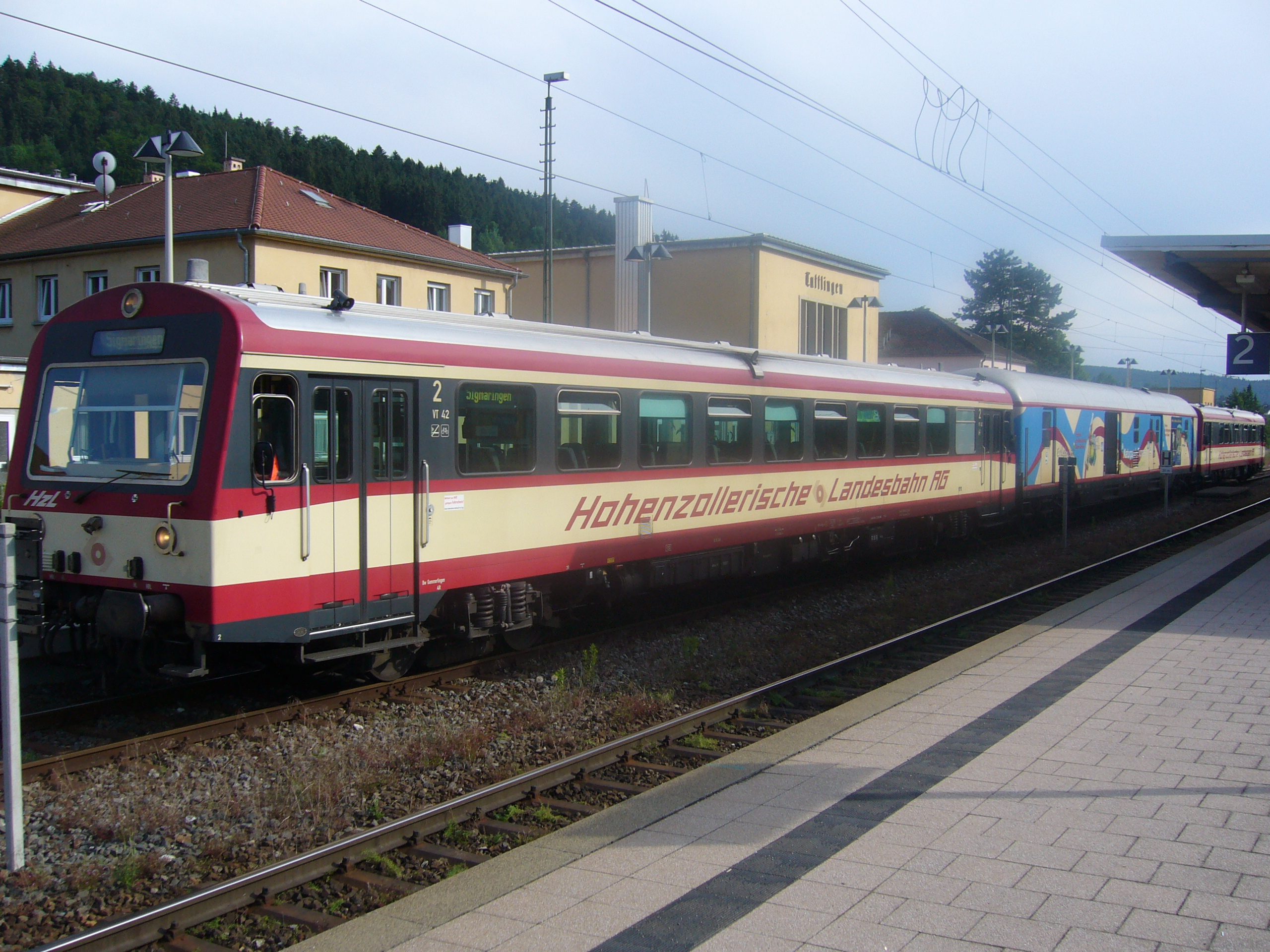
Naturpark-Express in Tuttlingen station

=== Platforms ===
- Platform track 1 is used for Ringzug (“ring train”) services to Fridingen
- Track 2 is used for regional and long-distance services on the Gäu Railway to Stuttgart
- Track 3 is used for regional services on the Danube Valley Railway to Ulm
- Track 4 is used for regional services on the Danube Valley Railway to Neustadt, and Ringzug services towards Rottweil / Villingen and Bräunlingen
- Track 5 is used for the regional and long-distance services on the Gäu Railway to Singen / Zurich and Ringzug services towards Immendingen / Geisingen-Leipferdingen

=== Length of platforms ===
- Track 1: height: 55 cm, length: 80 m; this is the only platform track that is completely barrier-free, since it is only used by Ringzug services
- Track 2: height: 76 cm, length: 320 m; not accessible
- Track 3: height: 76 cm, length: 320 m; not accessible
- Track 4: height: 76 cm, length: 320 m; only partially accessible for Ringzug services (not suitable for passengers in wheelchairs)
- Track 5: height: 76 cm, length: 320 m; only partially accessible for Ringzug services (not suitable for passengers in wheelchairs)

=== Location ===
The station is located about 2 km west of the old town on the edge of central Tuttlingen and is bordered on the west by the Koppenland district and allotments, as well as the Danube cycle path (Donauradweg). The track field extends to the former Baden district of Möhringen. The station forecourt east of the station is very close to the Aesculap company, Tuttlingen's largest employer.

=== Station or Hauptbahnhof? ===
Tuttlingen station is not among the 122 German stations called a Hauptbahnhof (“main” or “central” station) by Deutsche Bahn, but it is widely known as Tuttlingen Hauptbahnhof in Tuttlingen.

=== Use of the station infrastructure for non-railway purposes ===
Large parts of the station and the railway facilities are now privately owned and are no longer used to serve rail services. The station building is now divided into a rail section and a non-rail section and they are separated by a glass wall from each other. The non-rail section is mainly used by catering establishments.

At the locomotive shed and the turntable there is now a private Railway Museum, which now exhibits 26 (not usually serviceable) steam locomotives, mostly in the open air.

=== Operations ===
The station is a railway junction, where the Gäu Railway from Stuttgart to Singen meets the Danube Valley Railway from Ulm to Donaueschingen. Tuttlingen station now served only passenger trains. No freight is still handled at the station. Intercity (IC) and Regional-Express (RE) services are now operated by Deutsche Bahn, while Ringzug (lit. 'ring train') and Naturpark-Express services were operated by Hohenzollerische Landesbahn (HzL, which was mainly owned by the Baden-Württemberg government). The present-day railway operations at the station are owned by DB Station&Service. Deutsche Bahn currently classifies the station in station category 3.

==== Stuttgart–Tuttlingen–Zurich IC service ====
Intercity trains (IC) between Stuttgart and Zurich on the Gäu Railway stop at the station every hour. Tuttlingen is served by a total of seven pairs of trains per day that connect directly to Zurich and another eight that provide interchange in Singen, producing an hourly service. The IC services connect in Tuttlingen on the hour with the Ringzug services to Rottweil and Geisingen-Leipferdingen or Blumberg-Zollhaus. The international IC trains consist of class 1016 or 1116 locomotives of the ÖBB and EC coaches provided by the SBB, while the domestic German connections are operated with Intercity 2 trainsets.

Line	Route	Interval
IC 87	Stuttgart – Tuttlingen – Singen (Hohentwiel) – Schaffhausen – Zurich	Hourly

==== Regional Express (RE) and Regionalbahn (RB) ====
Line	Operator	Route	Frequency
RE 4	DB Regio Baden-Württemberg	Stuttgart – Böblingen – Herrenberg – Horb – Rottweil – Spaichingen – Tuttlingen – Singen – Konstanz	A pair of trains on Saturdays and Sundays
RE 55	DB Regio Baden-Württemberg	Ulm – Sigmaringen – Tuttlingen – Donaueschingen – Neustadt	Every 120 minutes, sometimes every 60 minutes
RB 43	SWEG	Bräunlingen – Donaueschingen – Villingen – Schwenningen – Trossingen – Rottweil – Spaichingen – Tuttlingen – Immendingen – Blumberg-Zollhaus	Every 60 minutes
RB 43a	SWEG	Sigmaringen – Tuttlingen – Immendingen	Some trains on weekends

In addition, the Schienenverkehrsgesellschaft mbH (SVG) operates FEX services on Saturday/Sunday and during holidays.

Line	Route	Frequency	Operator
FEXBodensee II	Stuttgart – Böblingen – Horb – Tuttlingen – Engen – Singen – Radolfzell – Konstanz	limited service	SVG

==== Ringzug and Naturpark-Express ====
Tuttlingen station is connected to a total of eight stops within the City of Tuttlingen by Ringzug (lit. 'ring train') services. This connects Tuttlingen station every hour on weekdays and every two hours on weekends over the Danube Valley Railway with Immendingen and from there via the Wutach Valley Railway (Wutachtalbahn) with Geisingen-Leipferdingen. Some Ringzug services, especially on weekends, are extended from Leipferdingen to Blumberg. Ringzug services over the Gäu Railway run via Spaichingen to Rottweil and then usually every two hours as far as Bräunlingen.

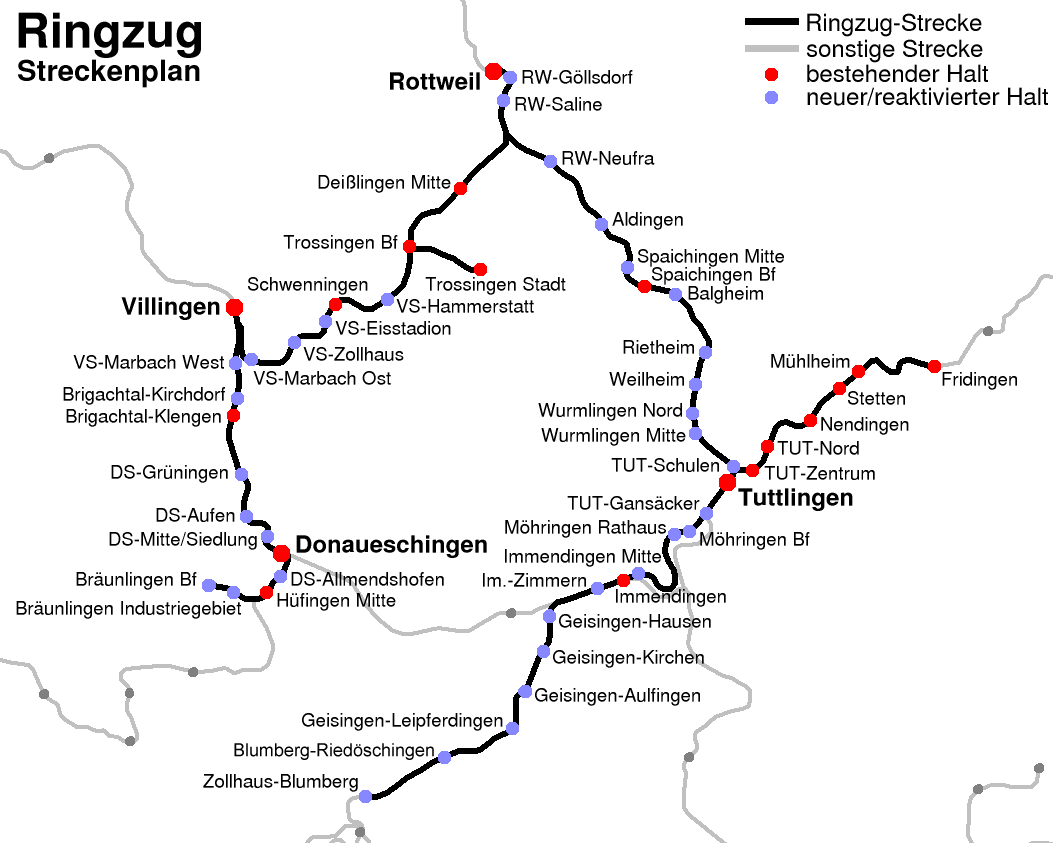
Tuttlingen station in the Ringzug network

Between May and October, Tuttlingen is served by the Naturpark-Express, connecting Tuttlingen with the Upper Danube Nature Park (Naturpark Obere Donau) and Gammertingen with connections to the RadWanderShuttle to Engstingen in the east and in the west with Blumberg on the Wutach Valley Railway museum railway and is targeted primarily at the tourist market.

==== Connections to the city bus service ====
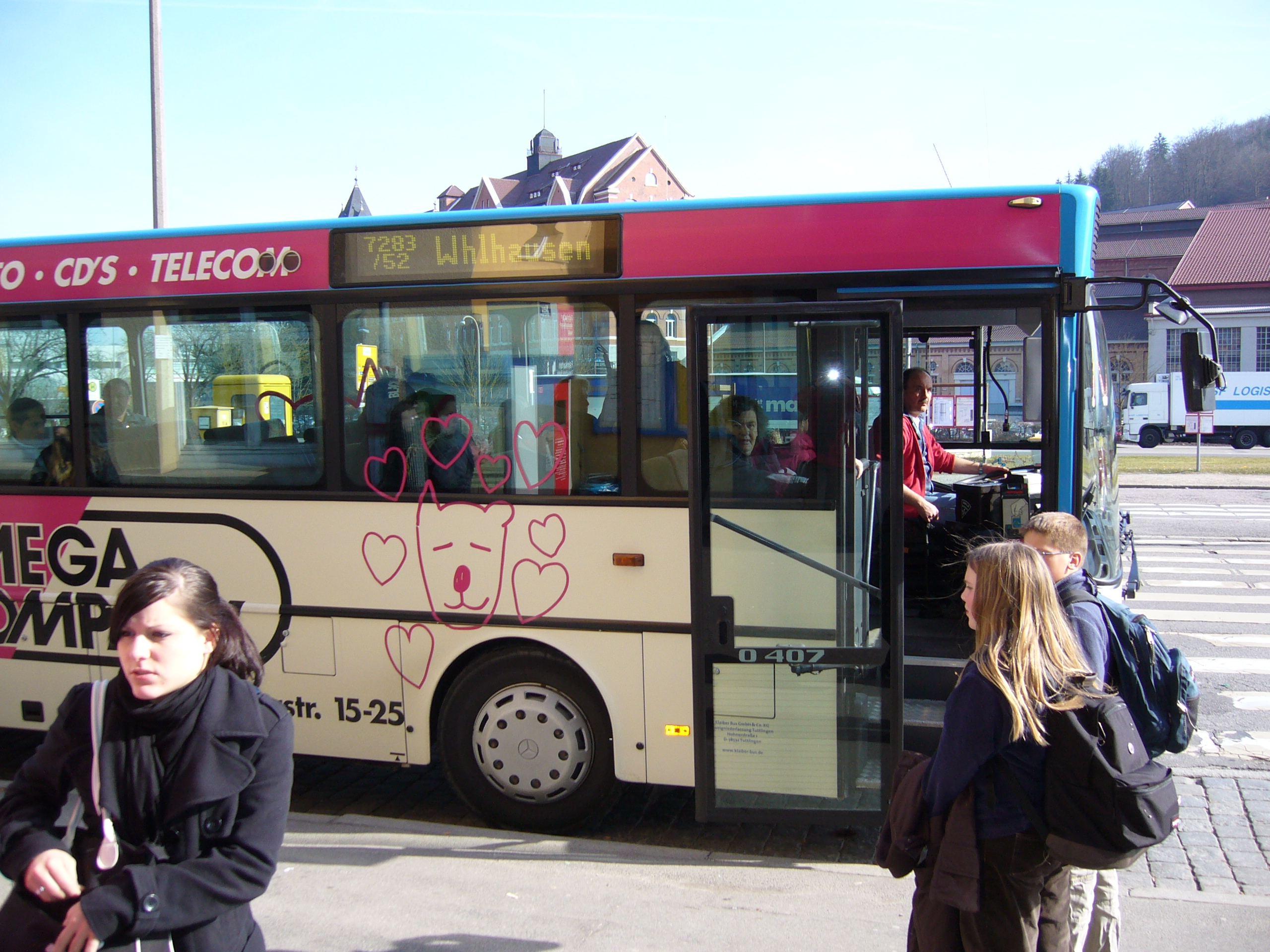
Bus in the station forecourt

Since Tuttlingen station is well outside the city centre and major residential areas, many passengers will need to use buses to continue their journeys. City buses run both on weekdays as on weekends at quarter-hour intervals to the central bus station in the central city, connecting to all the city and intercity buses. This basic cycle of four buses per hour on weekdays is supplemented by a number of additional buses.

=== Access for private transport ===
Immediately east of the station is the Danube cycle path (Donauradweg), which is a major tourist attraction. There is no bike path on Bahnhofstraße to the city centre. Rather, cyclists must cross Aesculap-Platz, the intersection point of two busy highways to reach the city centre. At the station non-secure bike parking is available. The construction of a bike station at the station is a project under the Local Agenda 21.

The station is well connected to the road network due to the proximity of two major highways. There is free parking for car drivers.

=== Barrier-free access ===
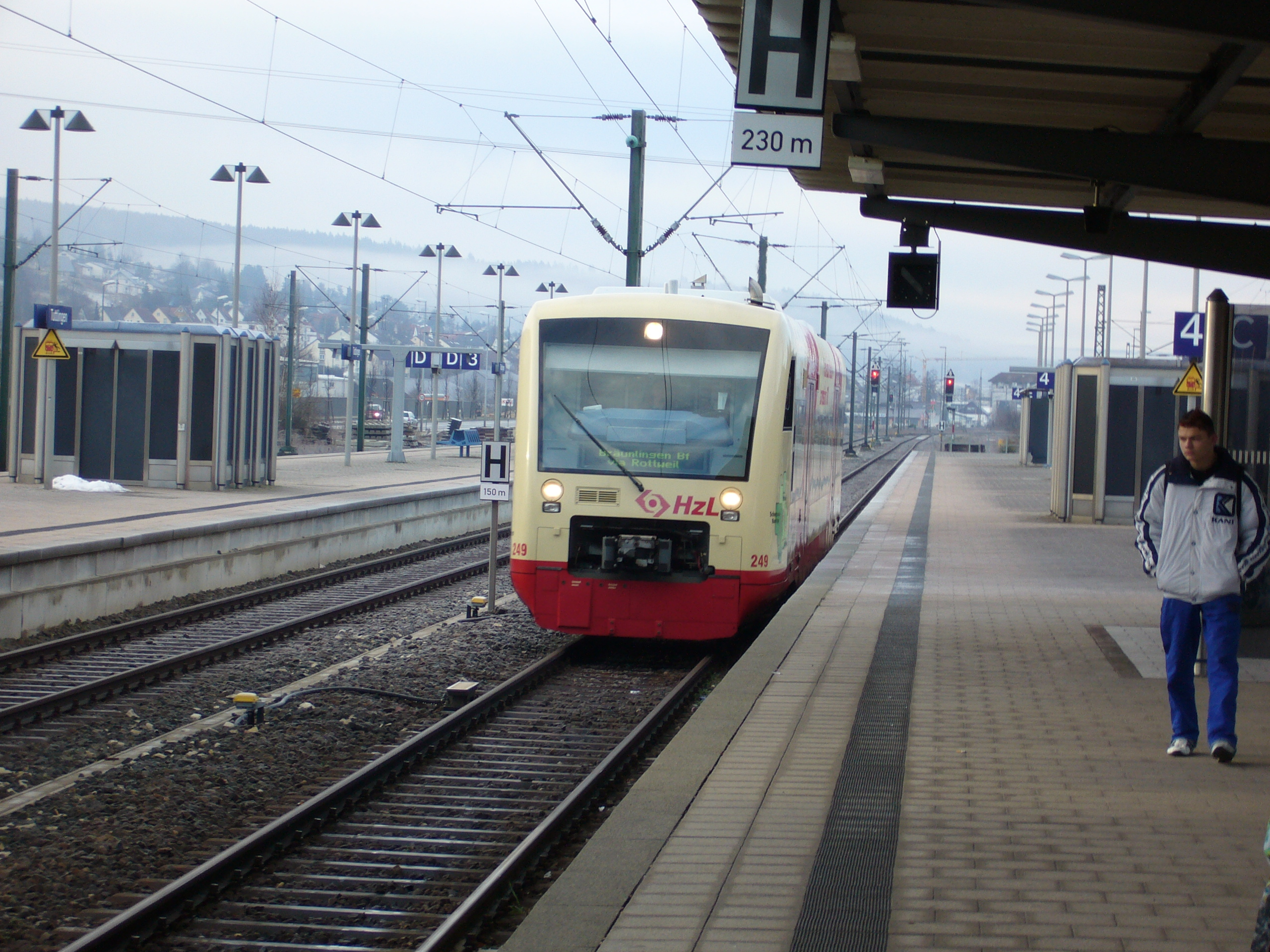
Ringzug service entering Tuttlingen station

Deutsche Bahn station classifies Tuttlinger station as partially accessible. There are lifts next to the stairs for access to the platforms. However, since platforms 2–5 have a platform height of 76 cm, there is generally no barrier-free access: they are only occasionally served by trains that allow step-free access, so wheelchair users generally require outside help to get on or off trains. Track 1 is fully accessible for the occasional departures of Ringzug services to Fridingen.
