= History of railways in Württemberg =

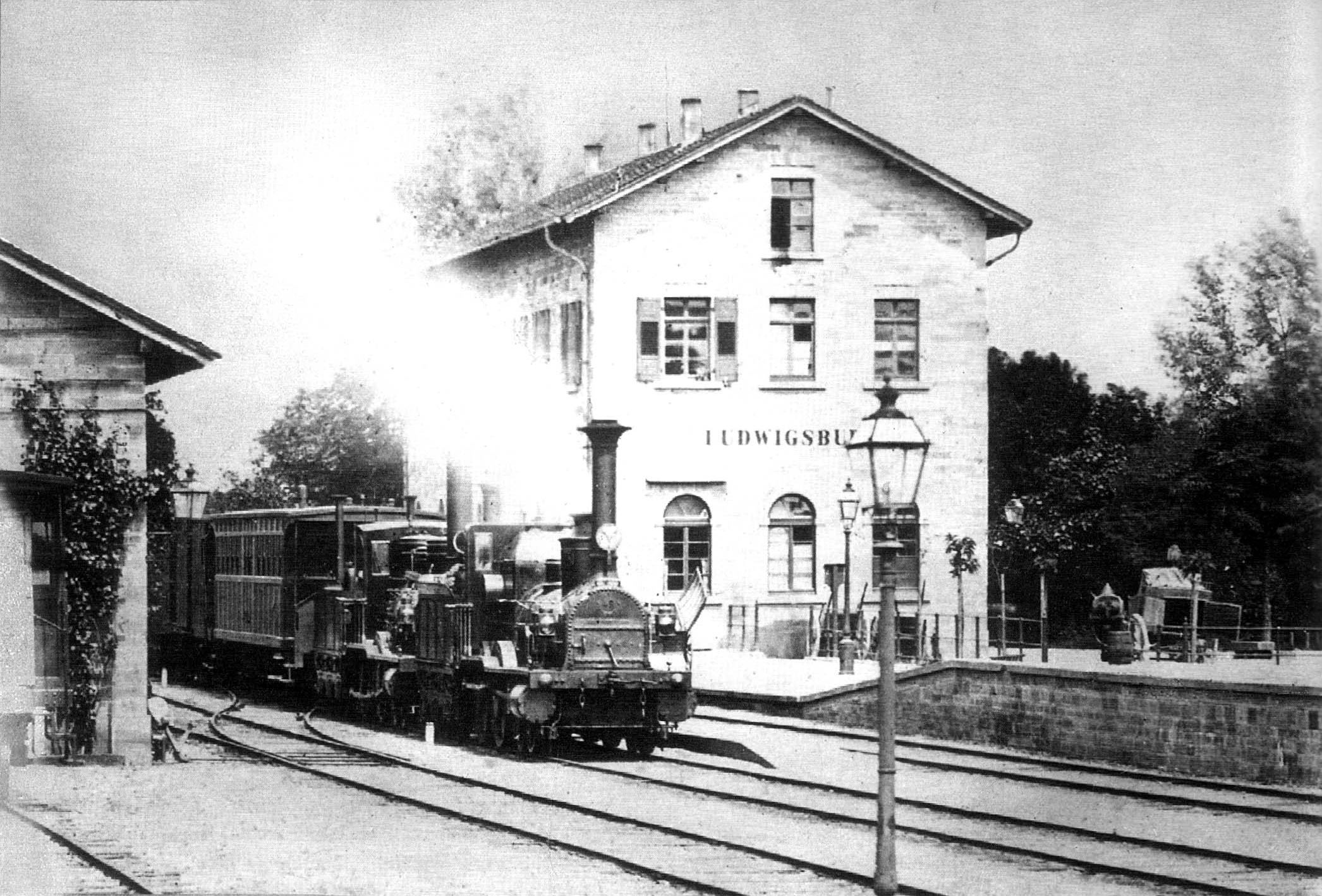
A steam train in the station in Ludwigsburg around 1860

The history of railways in Württemberg describes the beginnings and expansion of rail transport in Württemberg from the first studies in 1834 to today.

== Starting points ==
From the start of the 19th century, transport planning in the Kingdom of Württemberg revolved primarily around the construction of canals, which were meant to connect the rivers Neckar and Danube, and Lake Constance, with each other. As a result of the advent of railways elsewhere, King William I of Württemberg commissioned a study to determine whether the construction of railways instead of canals would be more appropriate. The report of the commission undertaking the study agreed and recommended the construction of a railway between Stuttgart and Ulm, running through the valleys of the rivers Rems, Kocher, and Brenz. Toward the end of 1835, additional demands developed in Ulm for a railway running from Stuttgart, via Ulm, along the Fils river, all the way to Lake Constance.

Despite the early and systematic state support of railway construction, it was another 10 years before the opening of the first railway in Württemberg. In the other larger states of the German Confederation (Deutscher Bund), such as Bavaria, Saxony, Prussia, Austria, Brunswick, Baden, and Hanover, at least one, and in some cases several, railways had been put into service by that time.

The late adoption was caused by the conclusion that the expensive construction of railways would not be cost-efficient in the relatively poor state. The total cost of building the main railways was thought to be about 30 million guilders, which was three times the state's annual gross domestic product. This relatively costly estimate was largely due to the hilly topography of Württemberg, and in particular the need to cross the Swabian Jura added to the expense. This mountain range splits the state into two sections, and the steep escarpment on the northern edge, the Albtrauf, posed a particularly challenging obstacle. In the southwestern part, the Black Forest formed part of the border with the neighbouring state of Baden. The planned routes, which were initially limited to running in river valleys, were also complicated by the interlocking of parts of the routes, such as in the Upper Neckar and Upper Danube valleys, with territory of the neighbouring states of Baden and Hohenzollern.

The construction of railways in neighbouring states, and the possibility of profits due to transit traffic, plus advances in railway engineering and technology, and the fear of being left behind by the development in the adjacent territories, finally provided the impetus needed to start railway building in Württemberg.

== Construction of the main railways ==
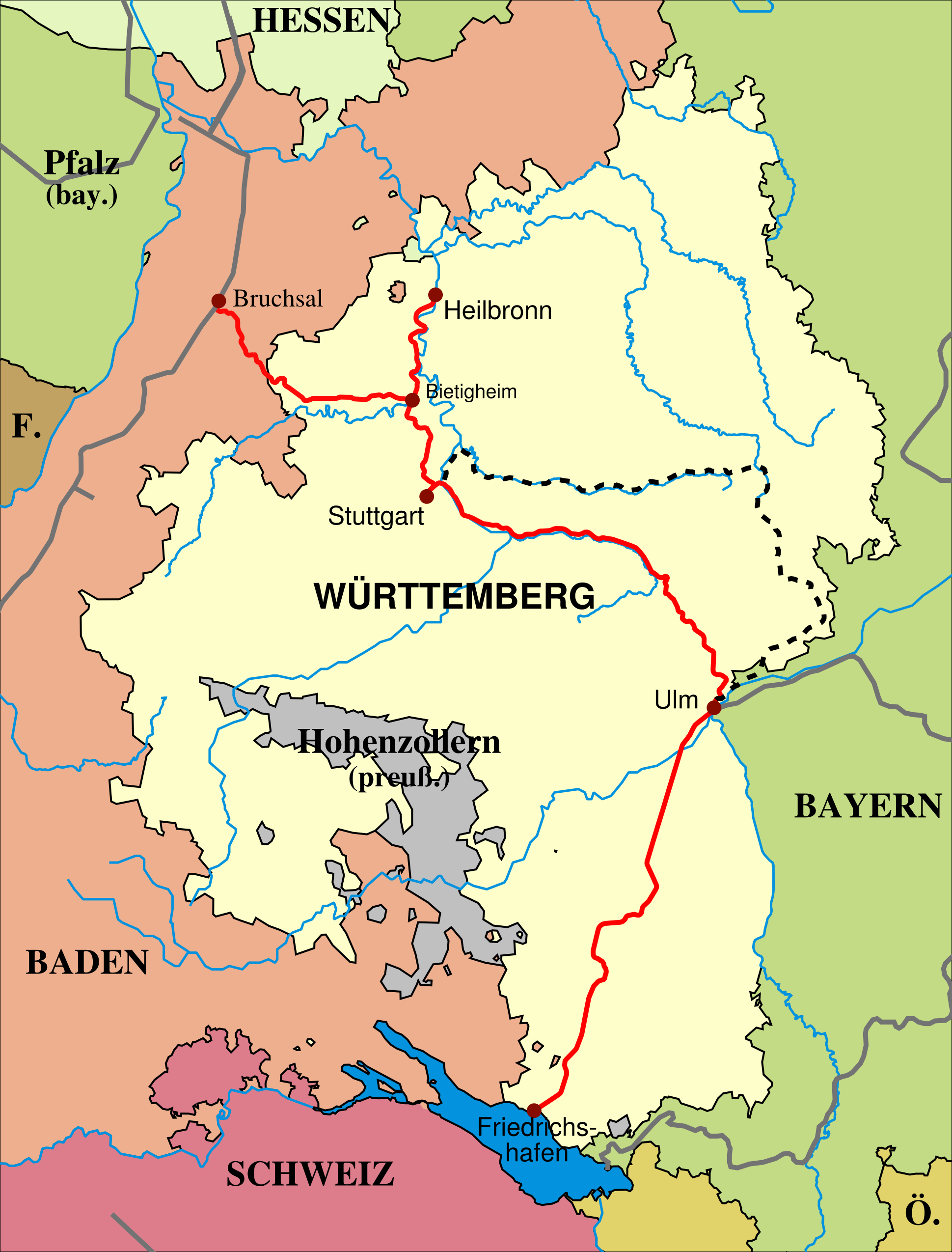
Railway network in 1854

The state government finally adopted the conclusions of the commission, and in 1836 formulated the plans for this initial list of main lines:

- Ostbahn (Eastern line):
  - 1st alternative: starting in Cannstatt, through the Fils valley, to Ulm, called the Fils Valley Railway (Filsbahn)
  - 2nd alternative: starting in Cannstatt, through the valleys of the rivers Neckar, Rems, and Brenz, to Ulm, called the Remsbahn (Rems railway)
- Northern Railway (Nordbahn): from Cannstatt to Heilbronn
- Western Railway (Westbahn): branching off the Nordbahn near Eglosheim, and running toward the cities of Bruchsal or Pforzheim in Baden
- Southern (Südbahn): from Ulm to Friedrichshafen on Lake Constance

These plans were completed in 1839, and were revised by the surveyors von Negrelli, Charles Vignoles, and Karl Etzel. The resulting central questions were:

- Routing of the Ostbahn: Using the Rems Railway alternative meant avoiding the Swabian Jura, but also meant a considerably longer route than the Fils Railway option, one which had to pass through Bavarian territory to boot. The direct route meant that the Geislinger Steige had to be conquered. Due to the better connection to Stuttgart, and the shorter distance to be covered, the Filsbahn alternative was chosen.
- Choice of the central station (Zentralbahnhof): The various plans had either Cannstatt, Stuttgart, or Berg as alternatives for the central railway station of the network. Because of the location of Stuttgart in the basin of a valley, initially plans called for a connection from Cannstatt or Berg via a secondary connection line only. Etzel later drew up plans that included modern engineering, including the Prague Tunnel and Rosenstein Tunnel, which made possible the location of the central station in the middle of Stuttgart. Since Stuttgart was by far the largest city of the three, and therefore passenger traffic expectation were highest, the decision was made to go with the Stuttgart location, even though its geographical location caused problems that still exist today (see Stuttgart 21).

The Royal Württemberg State Railways (Königlich Württembergischen Staats-Eisenbahnen or K.W.St.E.) were intended as state railways (Länderbahnen) from the beginning; applications for licences to operate private railway companies (for example, the Württembergischen Eisenbahngesellschaft, which had been founded as a private company in 1836) were initially denied. The government, and King, were interested in preserving the rights of the state with a view on the profits foreseen in the rail transit traffic between states. The negotiation of railway connection rights between the neighbouring states was a task for the state governments in any case.

On 18 April 1843, the Railway Law (Eisenbahngesetz) was passed, which legislated the creation of the railways listed above. The same law restricted the investment of private funds in the area of secondary connecting railways (Sekundärbahn). This law was also the impetus for the founding of the Maschinenfabrik Esslingen, which became the primary operator and designer of railway construction and railway technology in Württemberg.

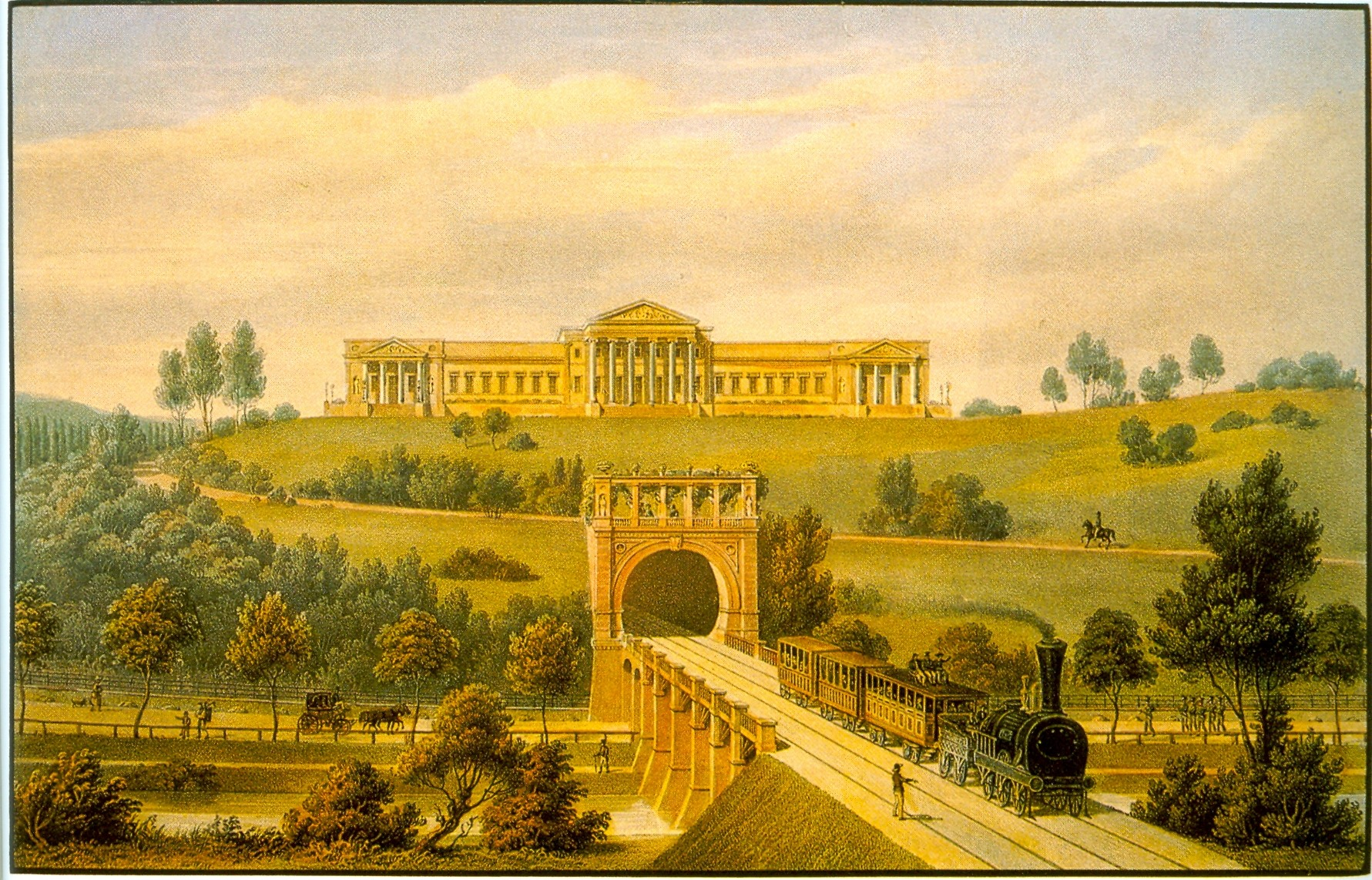
Rosenstein with the railway tunnel around 1845, at the time of the opening of the section Stuttgart-Esslingen

After the passage of the law, the Zentralbahn (Central line) was the first line to be started, which connected Stuttgart via two separate branches with Ludwigsburg and Esslingen. Construction began in 1844, and the first section between Cannstatt und Untertürkheim was opened for service on 22 October 1845, with the entire line completed in 1846. The Nordbahn was completed in 1848, and the Ostbahn and Südbahn were completed in 1850.

The Westbahn required negotiations with Baden. These discussions were typical of the relationship of Württemberg with its neighbouring states, which was marked by both cooperation and competition. Both sides were convinced of the necessity of a railway connection on the one hand, but at the same time, both states were also interested in keeping the transit traffic from the north inside their territory as much as possible. Württemberg would have liked a connection between Heilbronn and Wiesloch, and Baden was inclined to grant a connection via Durlach–Pforzheim. By connecting in Bruchsal, a compromise was reached. As a result of these negotiations, the Westbahn was constructed between 1850 and 1853, and subsequently put into service. In 1854, a connection to the Bavarian railway network was achieved in Ulm.

The direct route Bretten–Stuttgart–Ulm developed into the most important railway axis in Württemberg, and it came to be known as the Hauptbahn (Main line).

== Internal expansion ==
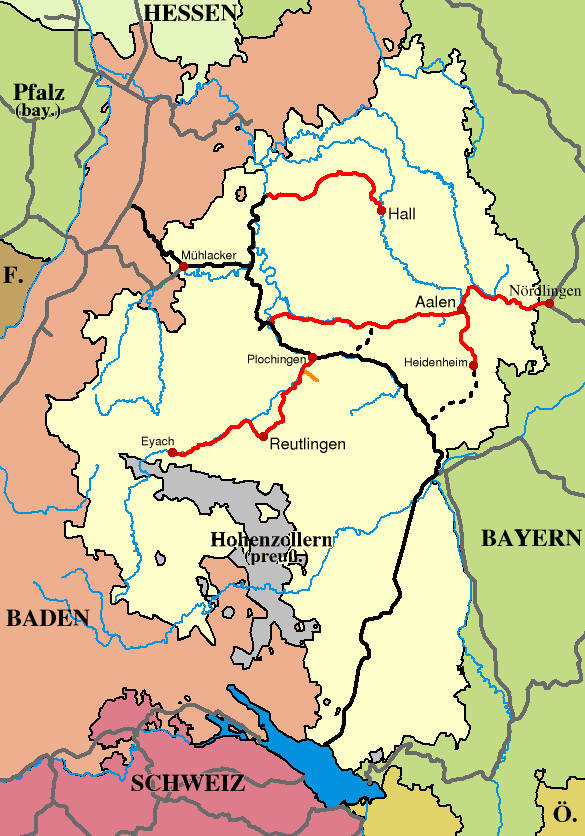
Railway network in 1864

Even though the main lines turned out to be economically successful, a lull in railway construction commenced for the next several years. However, between 1854 and 1856 a steel mill for the manufacture of rails was built in Wasseralfingen near Aalen. Only in 1857 did the construction of railways restart in these areas of urgent need:

- the upper Neckar region with the industrial city of Reutlingen and Tübingen
- the northeast of the state of Württemberg
- the east, with Aalen and Heidenheim, with eye on a connection to the Bavarian railway network near Nördlingen

Of these projects, the first to be realized was the Upper Neckar Railway, with the section Plochingen–Reutlingen completed in 1859, the expansion to Rottenburg in 1861, and to Eyach in 1864.

To open up the northeast of Württemberg, the initial plans called for a route from Heilbronn through the Kocher valley and via Hall to Aalen. Due to the technical difficulty of that route, it was abandoned and a route via Öhringen, Hall, and Crailsheim, then through the Jagst valley to Aalen was planned instead. However, the new Railway Law of 18 November 1858 legislated only the construction of the Kocher Railway to Hall, which was completed in 1862.

To get the railway into the east of Württemberg, in 1857 the state government had planned on a route branching off the Fils Valley Railway near Lonsee to Heidenheim. After further exploration, this plan was found to be uneconomical, and was abandoned. Branching off in Uhingen in the Fils valley to Lorch, and then running through the Rems valley to Aalen, was thought to have a better chance of being realized. This route also offered a better connection to the Upper Neckar Railway. However, Bavaria, which feared competition on its own north–south connection, indicated that it would not permit a connection to its railway network at Nördlingen. For this reason, the Rems Railway, running from Cannstatt to Waiblingen, and from there alongside the Rems river to Aalen and Wasseralfingen, was constructed, and opened for service in 1861. Also in 1861, the states of Württemberg and Bavaria signed a treaty, which codified the expansion of this line to Nördlingen, which was completed in 1863. However, that treaty did include an unfavorable clause for Württemberg, which prohibited the direct connection between Aalen and Ulm (later to become the Brenz Railway) until 1875. For this reason, it was just a branch line that was constructed in 1864 to connect Aalen to Heidenheim.

== Connections to other states ==
At the time of the construction of the Western Railway, Baden had secured the right to a possible connection in Mühlacker to a railway coming from Pforzheim. Baden completed this connection in 1863 (please see Karlsruhe–Mühlacker railway), which meant that Mühlacker on the Württemberg side became a railway node, and grew in a short time from a village to a small city.

Any additional expansion of the rail network required negotiations with neighbouring states. Along with Bavaria and Baden, these states included Prussia, whose territory of Hohenzollern bordered on Württemberg, and Hesse, whose exclave Wimpfen was situated between Baden and Württemberg.

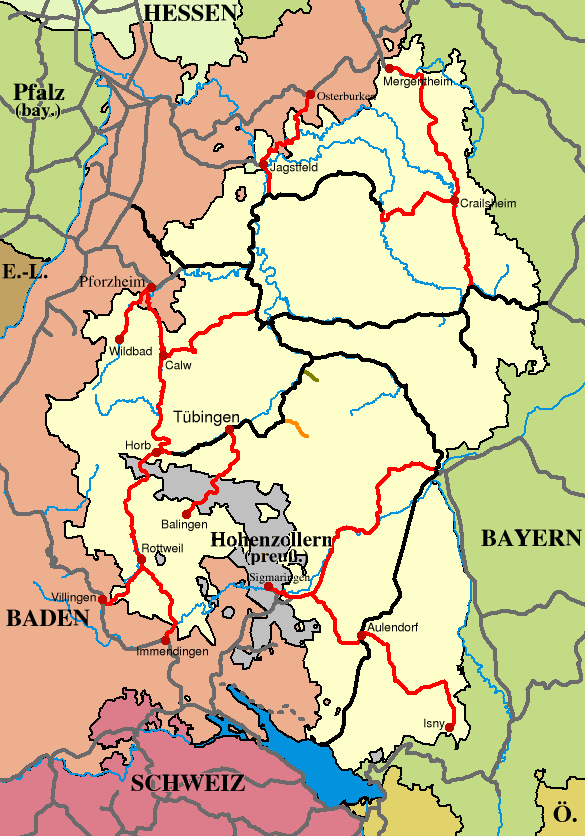
Railway network in 1874

In 1864, three northerly connection points to the Odenwald Railway (Heidelberg–Mosbach–Würzburg) in Baden were agreed upon:

- from Heilbronn via Jagstfeld and Wimpfen to Meckesheim (now part of the Franconia Railway, Elsenz Valley Railway)
- from Heilbronn via Jagstfeld to Osterburken (now part of the Franconia Railway)
- from Crailsheim via Mergentheim to Lauda (Tauber Valley Railway)

A connection along the Neckar in the direction of Eberbach to the Hessian railway there, which was desired by Württemberg, did not materialize, due to opposition by Baden, which feared competition to its Rhine Valley Railway.

The above agreements meant the development of Jagstfeld and Crailsheim into railway nodes. The planned railways were constructed between 1866 and 1869, and Crailsheim was additionally connected to Goldshöfe station (on the Rems Railway) via the Upper Jagst Railway and Hall via the Hohenlohe Railway.

In the south, Württemberg planned to expand its Upper Neckar Railway via Horb am Neckar to Rottweil. In addition, another line was planned from Stuttgart to Horb, which was meant to speed up that connection. The latter was possible in two alternatives: via Böblingen and Herrenberg (now on the Stuttgart–Horb railway), or via Weil der Stadt, Calw, and Nagold (on the Black Forest Railway). Based on the estimated expense, the latter option was initially chosen.

This railway was supposed to be able to connect to the railway network of Baden south of Rottweil, but Baden saw this line as competition to its Rhine Valley Railway. On the other hand, Baden was interested in a connection between Waldshut, where it had a connection into Switzerland, and Ulm. That connection was seen by Baden as having the potential for profits via a connection between France and Switzerland and the east. Württemberg saw that line as competition to its Southern Railway. Added to this picture was the complication that both of these desired lines would need to run through the territory of Hohenzollern, which would require negotiations with Prussia. Prussia was interested in getting its city of Sigmaringen onto the railway network in exchange for an agreement on these other railway plans. In 1865, all of these factors led to the following negotiated agreement on the construction of these railways:

- at the Neckar river: from Eyach to Horb, and, crossing Hohenzollern territory, to Rottweil, then branching off there to Villingen (the Rottweil–Villingen railway), and via Tuttlingen to Immendingen in Baden (now forming the Plochingen–Immendingen railway);
- in the Black Forest: one line from Pforzheim to Wildbad (the Enz Valley Railway), and another to Calw (the Black Forest Railway);
- in Hohenzollern: a line from Tübingen to the Prussian Hechingen, and on to Balingen, Ebingen, and Sigmaringen (the Tübingen–Sigmaringen railway);
- construction of the Waldshut-Ulm connection (including the Radolfzell–Mengen railway) along the Ablach and Danube rivers via Radolfzell, Schwackenreute, Meßkirch (in Baden), Krauchenwies (in Prussia), and Mengen (in Württemberg), with connecting lines from both Krauchenwies and Mengen to Sigmaringen, and an additional connection from Aulendorf to Schwackenreute.

The latter connection had to do with the concurrent construction of the Herbertingen–Isny railway, which meant that Aulendorf became a railway node. The agreement also included the closing of the gap to Lake Constance, which was not completed at this time.

These agreements resulted in great construction activity, which were only slightly delayed by the wars of 1866 (Austro-Prussian War) and 1871 (Franco-Prussian War). The railways along the Neckar were completed between 1866 and 1870; the lines in the Black Forest, inclusive of the connection Stuttgart–Calw–Horb, between 1868 and 1874. The connection Waldshut–Ulm was put into service in 1873, and 1875 saw the opening of the railways in the Allgäu. The connection between Tübingen and Sigmaringen was constructed in several sections between 1869 and 1878.

== After the founding of the German Reich ==
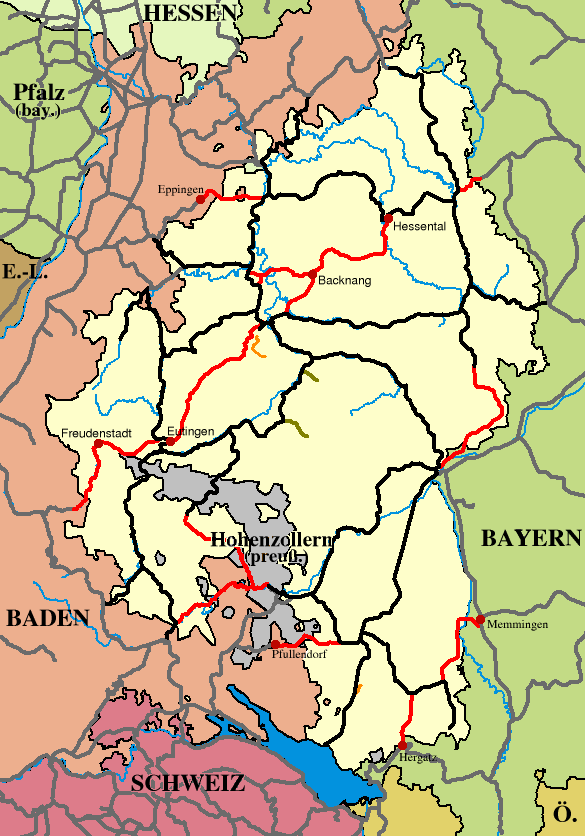
Railway network in 1890

In 1871, Württemberg joined the German Reich, founded at the conclusion of the Franco-Prussian War. The railways of the states remained independent, regardless of the efforts of Reichskanzler Otto von Bismarck. However, Article 42 of the constitution of the Reich demanded that the individual state railways would allow the administration of the railway network as one integrated unit in the interest of public transportation. The Reich railway office had the responsibility of overseeing railway activities. In addition, Article 41 of the constitution enabled the Reich government to order the construction of railways for military purposes.

Railway construction after the founding of the Reich, in particular construction to eliminate any gaps in east–west connections, can therefore be understood as having been done on behalf of the military, which demanded transportation capacity from the east to the French border. Also, the law legislating the management of the network as one unit offered the opportunity to Württemberg to finally achieve some of the connections which had been denied by neighbouring states on the basis of unwanted competition.

Until 1890, Württemberg was focused on the completion of its main railways (Hauptbahnen). The most significant project at the time was the creation of a northeast–southwest axis, made up of the Murr Railway Schwäbisch Hall–Hessental and the Eutingen im Gäu–Schiltach railway line Stuttgart–Freudenstadt, with a construction plan of 1872, and the completion of construction in 1879 and 1880. Both lines were further connected into Baden and Bavaria, and the Murr Valley Railway was expanded via two connecting lines to the Northern Railway, from Backnang to Bietigheim and to Ludwigsburg.

Württemberg had also finally reached an agreement with Bavaria on the construction of the Brenz Railway, which traveled across a section of Bavarian territory, and completed the connection between Heidenheim und Ulm. This railway was made possible by the expiration of the limitation on this connection in 1861, and was completed in 1876.

In 1873, an agreement was reached with Baden on the construction of the Kraichgau Railway, which was constructed between 1878 and 1880 and traveled from Durlach via Bretten and Eppingen to Heilbronn, with one half of the line running through each state. Part of the agreement was the repurchase by Baden of the section Bretten–Bruchsal, which meant that the Württemberg section of the Western Railway only ran to Bretten. Lastly, the agreement made possible the Jagstfeld–Neckarelz–Eberbach connection desired by Württemberg, which was completed by Baden in 1879.

Other state railways were constructed in the Allgäu region between Kißlegg and Wangen (1880) and further into the Bavarian Hergatz (1890), and between Leutkirch and the Bavarian town of Memmingen (1889). Alongside the upper Danube, the gap between Tuttlingen and Sigmaringen was closed in 1890.

These additions meant the completion of the main line network in 1890. In 1899 and 1901, respectively, the finals gaps with the railways of Baden and Bavaria were closed in the area of Lake Constance. The railways in Württemberg were not only profitable, and supplied those profits to the coffers of the state government, but were also significant in the rapid advancement of industrialization in the state during the 19th century. Towns located on railways were attractive to industry, and often grew enormously as a result. The railway network has also proven to be long-lived; almost all of the network is still in use today, even though some sections have lost their earlier importance. The exceptions are:

- the Weil der Stadt–Calw section of the Black Forest Railway, which had lost much of its significance soon after its construction due to the Gäu Railway;
- the Beihingen–Bietigheim branch from the Murr Valley Railway, which, after suffering damage in 1945, was not rebuilt;
- the Altshausen–Pfullendorf section of the Altshausen–Schwackenreute railway, which was closed for passenger traffic in 1964;
- the Leutkirch–Isny section on the Herbertingen–Isny railway.

== Construction of secondary lines ==
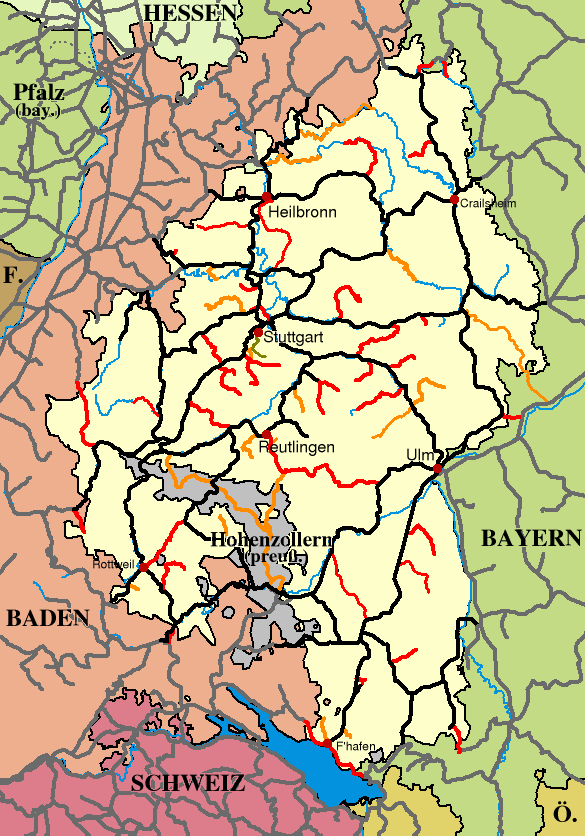
Railway network in 1940

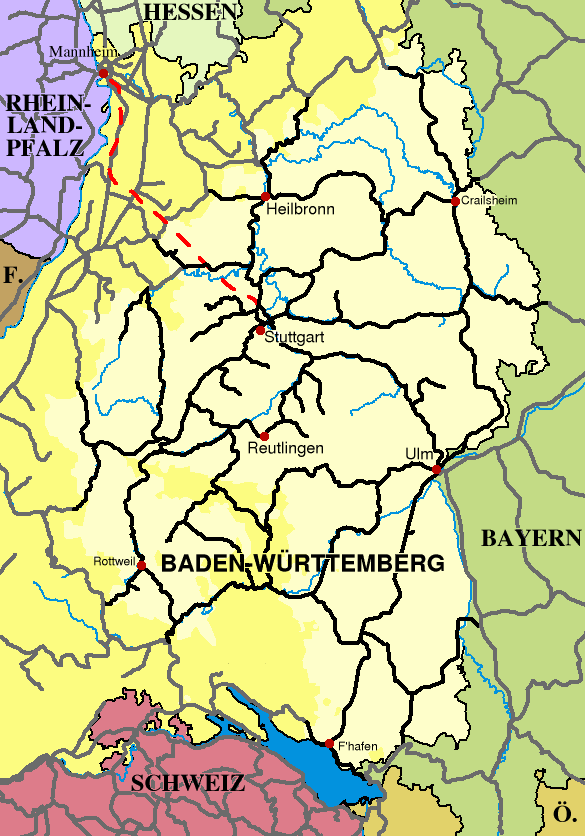
Railway network in 2005

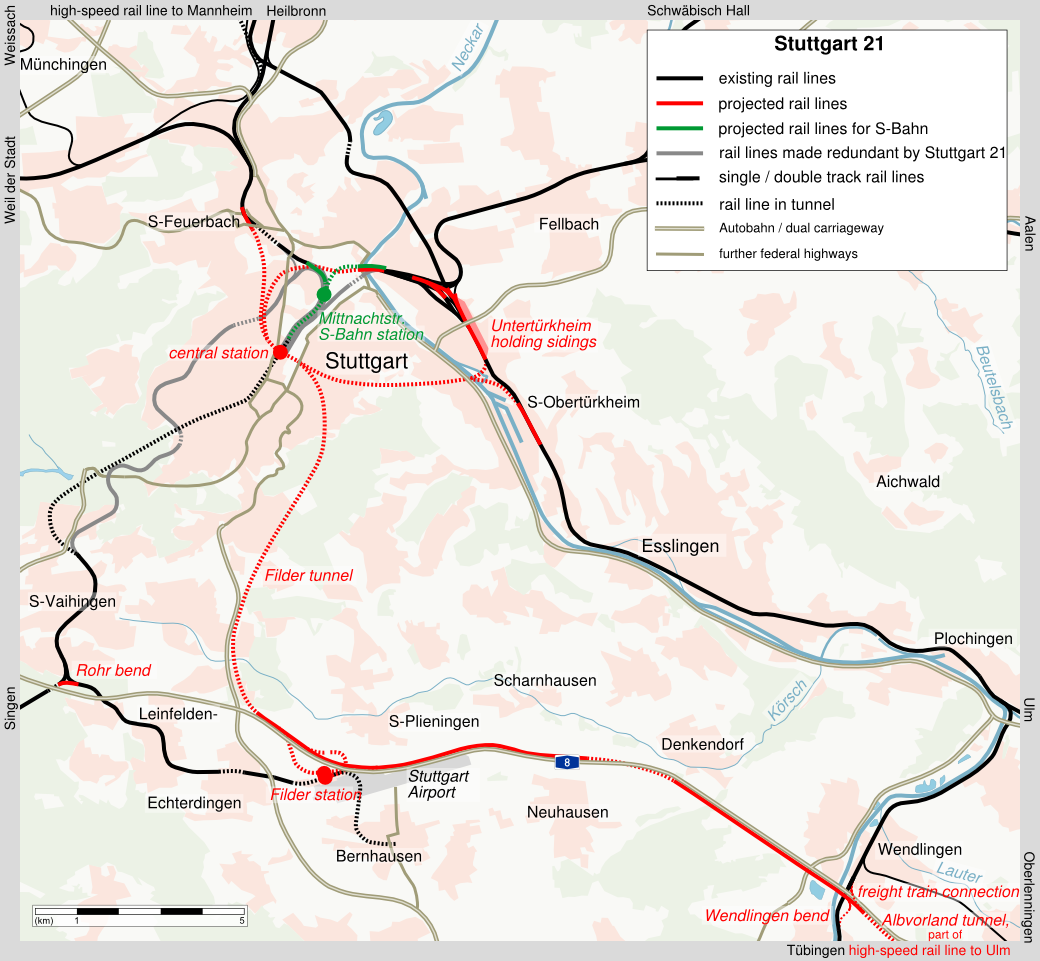
Project Stuttgart 21

The flip side of the economic success of the areas on the main railways was that communities who were not connected to the network were left behind by the industrialization, and more and more pushed for their own integration into the railway net. The connection of these areas, which were often located in unfavorable spots from a geographic perspective, had already been thought about in the Railway Law of 1843, with permission for the construction of these secondary connections to be given to private companies.

The first of these railways was the connection between Unterboihingen (today called Wendlingen) and Kirchheim unter Teck (the Teck Railway), constructed in 1864 by the Kirchheimer Eisenbahn-Gesellschaft. In 1873, the privately owned Erms Valley Railway was completed, in 1884 the Filder Railway joined this list, and in 1888 the narrow-gauge connection Ravensburg–Weingarten–Baienfurt was opened. The Altensteigerle between Nagold and Altensteig saw the start of an era of construction of branch lines by the state railways, and numerous state and private secondary railway lines were built by the 1920s.

The new branch lines were usually run through river valleys, and were built using standard gauge; in some cases, due to cost restrictions, narrow gauge was used. Very few of the branch lines were built to connect already existing lines, and building this type of connection by private companies was prohibited in any case.

In the Stuttgart area a few bypass lines were added to relieve the pressure on the main station at the state capital. These included the Schuster Railway from Kornwestheim to Untertürkheim, completed in 1896, the Rankbach Railway from Böblingen to Renningen, completed between 1914 and 1915, as well as the construction of the shunting yard in Kornwestheim between 1918 and 1920.

== Transition to the Reichsbahn ==
After World War I, the constitution of 1919 brought to an end the independence of the state railways; on 1 April 1920, they joined to form the Reichsbahn. The former state railways directorate of Württemberg became the Reichsbahn directorate Stuttgart (Reichsbahndirektion Stuttgart). The railway network at the time was 2,153 kilometres in length.

Construction of new lines continued until 1928, and then ceased. The profitability of the railways had experienced a marked decrease, not only due to the economic crises of the time, but also due to the poor results of some of the branch lines. In addition, automobile passenger traffic started to become a competitor to the railways.

Among the railway openings worth mentioning before the start of World War II are the section Klosterreichenbach–Raumünzach on the Murg Valley Railway, completed in 1928, and the connection between Tuttlingen und Hattingen of 1934, which eliminated the hair pin curve in Immendingen for trains between Stuttgart and Singen. The projects at the border between Baden and Württemberg were only completed under the aegis of the Reichsbahn.

== World War II and further development ==
During World War II, the railways became targets of numerous aerial attacks due to their military significance, and at the end of the war, many of the railway bridges were destroyed by the retreating Wehrmacht troops. At the end of the war, the railway network was inoperable.

Württemberg was split into a northern American (called Württemberg-Baden) and southern French (called Württemberg-Hohenzollern) zone of occupation. In both zones, the railways were quickly repaired as an important component of the rebuilding efforts. The French occupation forces were additionally interested in using rail transport to get reparations moved into France, and helped themselves to parts of the railway infrastructure itself, such as the deconstruction of the second track between Horb and Tuttlingen on the Plochingen–Immendingen railway. In 1952, Württemberg became part of the new state of Baden-Württemberg.

After the reconstruction of the railway network, there was no additional new construction undertaken. The reason, as was the case in the rest of Germany, was the ever-increasing share of passenger traffic utilizing automobiles, which also became the preferred transport method supported by the national government. This led to the elimination of passenger service on some lines, and the complete closing of other lines, starting at the end of the 1950s. This had the biggest impact on the branch lines constructed since 1890, with the newest lines seeing the most service reductions and closings.

In 1978, the Verkehrs- und Tarifverbund Stuttgart (VVS) was founded in Stuttgart, which manages and operates the Stuttgart S-Bahn network in the Stuttgart area.

Since the railway reforms of 1994, which asked that the states take responsibility for their own regional and local transport networks, a slight trend toward the reopening of a few of the closed branch lines is apparent; examples are the Schönbuch Railway (1996), Erms Valley Railway (1999), or the Balingen–Schömberg section of the Balingen–Rottweil line (2002).

The Mannheim–Stuttgart high-speed railway was constructed by 1991 for ICE trains, which replaced the use of the former Western Railway line in terms of long-distance connections. As part of the project Stuttgart 21, which also includes a complete redesign and construction of a new Stuttgart Hauptbahnhof, a new high-speed railway between Stuttgart and Ulm (Stuttgart–Wendlingen high-speed railway and Wendlingen–Ulm high-speed railway) is also planned, which would be used by ICE trains instead of the Fils Valley Railway.

== Popular culture ==
The railways of Württemberg inspired the Volkslied Auf de schwäbsche Eisebahne.

== See also ==
- Rail transport in Germany
- Royal Württemberg State Railways

== Literature ==
- Walz, Werner: Die Eisenbahn in Baden-Württemberg: Geschichte der Bahnen in Baden und Württemberg 1840 bis heute. Motorbuch Verlag, Stuttgart 1980, ISBN 3-87943-716-5
- von Morlok, Georg: Die Königlich Württembergischen Staatseisenbahnen: Rückschau auf deren Erbauung während der Jahre 1835–1889 unter Berücksichtigung ihrer geschichtlichen, technischen und finanziellen Momente und Ergebnisse. 1890 (Nachdruck: Siedentop, Heidenheim 1986, ISBN 3-924305-01-3)
- Albert Mühl, Kurt Seidel: Die Württembergischen Staatseisenbahnen. Theiss, Stuttgart und Aalen 1970, ISBN 3-8062-0032-7
- Bernd Beck: Schwäbische Eisenbahn – Bilder von der Königlich Württembergischen Staatseisenbahn. Gebr. Metz, Tübingen 1989, ISBN 3-921580-78-1
- Otto Supper: Die Entwicklung des Eisenbahnwesens im Königreich Württemberg. Denkschrift zum 50. Jahrestag der Eröffnung der ersten Eisenbahnstrecke in Württemberg am 28. Oktober 1845. 1905 (Nachdruck: Kohlhammer, Stuttgart 1981, ISBN 3-17-005976-9)
