= Tuttlingen–Hattingen railway line =

Railway line in Germany

Tuttlingen–Hattingen
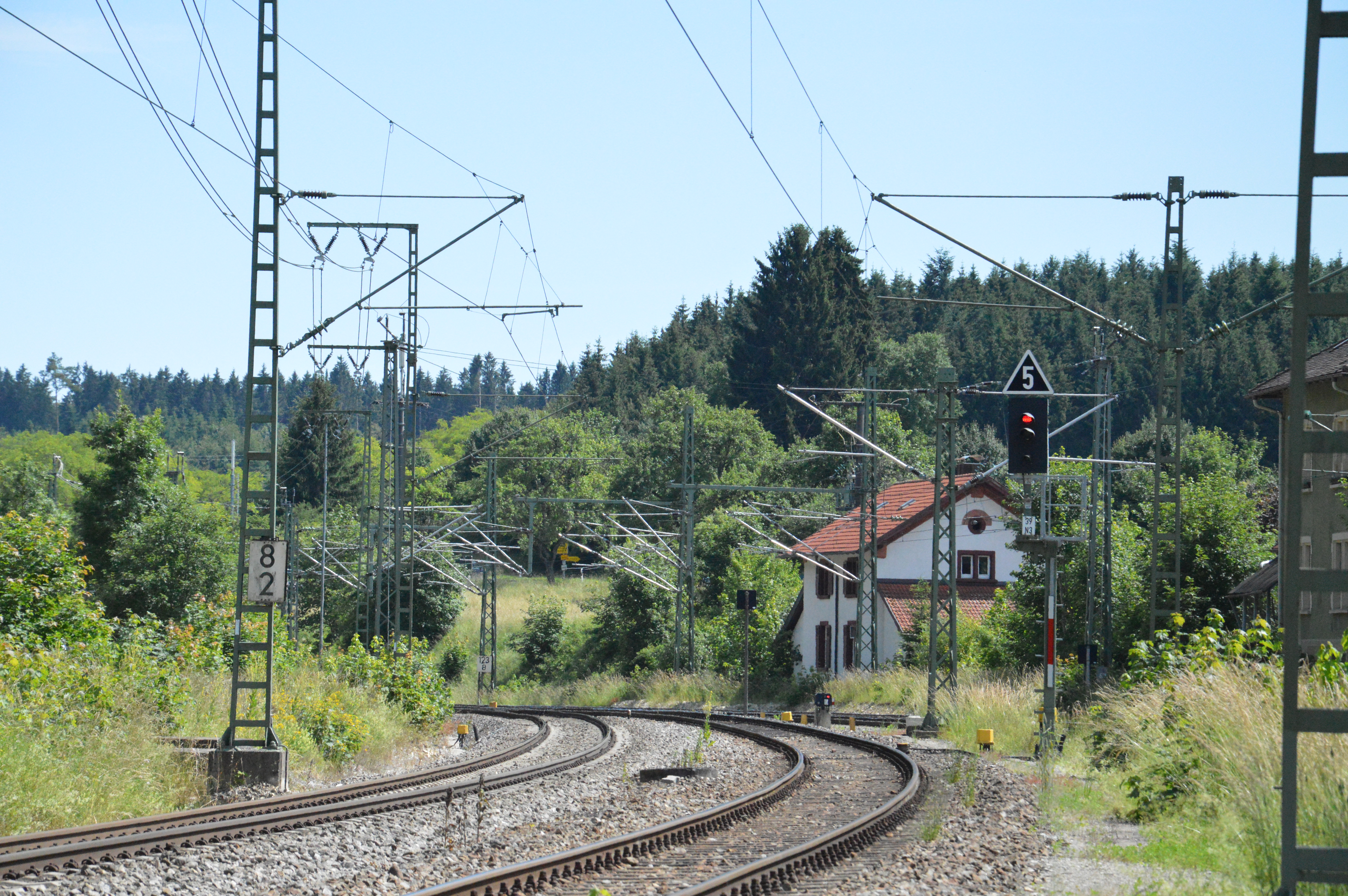
- Junction with the Black Forest Railway at Hattingen

Overview
- Line number: 4661
- Stations: 1

Service
- Route number: 740

Technical
- Line length: 8.5 km (5.3 mi)
- Number of tracks: 1
- Track gauge: 1,435 mm (4 ft 8 1/2 in) standard gauge
- Electrification: 15 kV/16.7 Hz AC overhead catenary

The Tuttlingen–Hattingen railway line, also called the Hattingen curve, is a railway line Baden-Württemberg, Germany. It runs 8.5 kilometres (5.3 mi) from Tuttlingen to Hattingen (Baden), creating a north–south line that bypasses Immendingen to the west. The line forms part of the Gäubahn between Stuttgart and Singen (Hohentwiel).

== Services ==
In addition to freight traffic, the Hattingen curve hosts regular Intercity trains between Stuttgart and points south, including Singen (Hohentwiel), Konstanz, and Zürich.
