= Gäubahn =

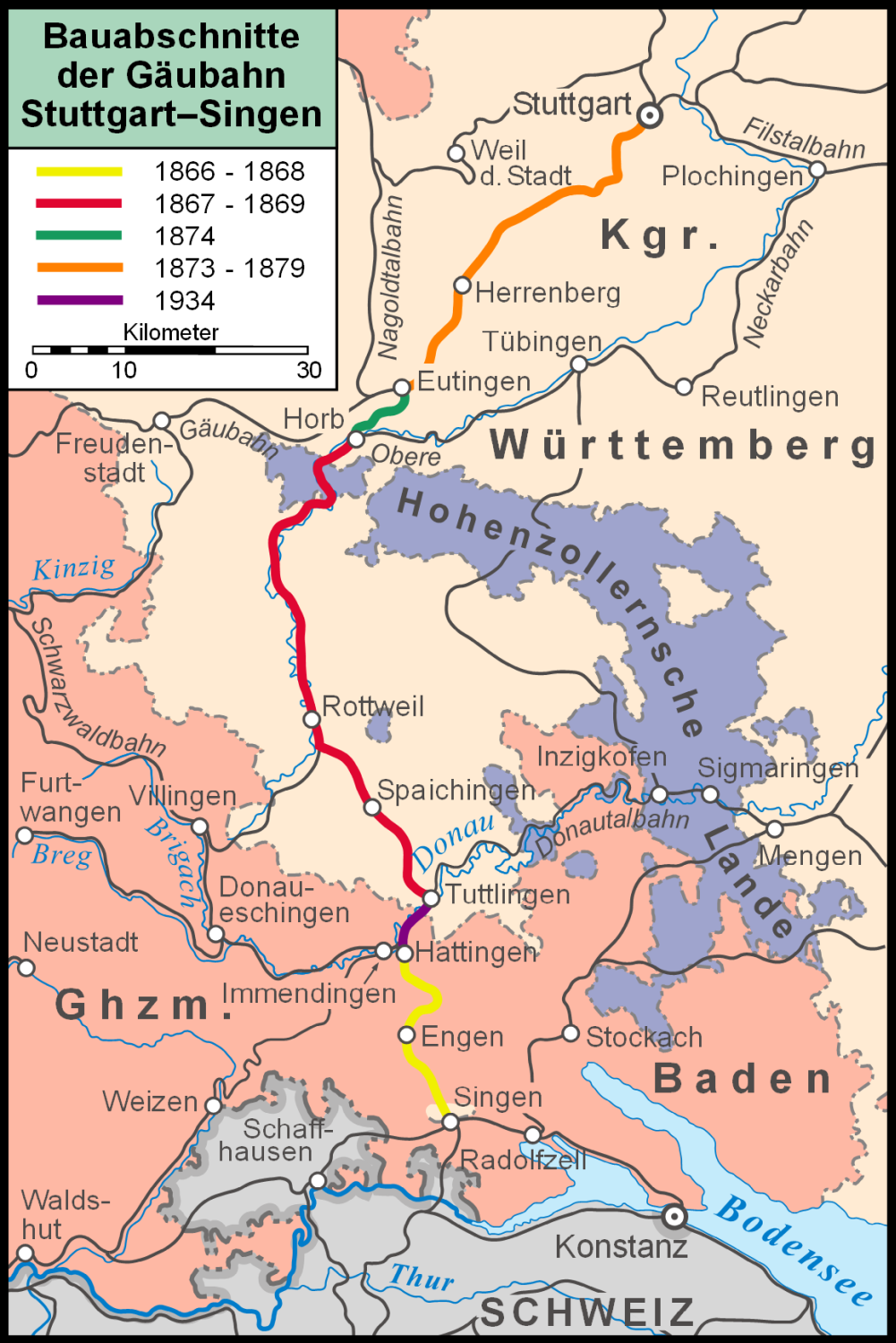
Course and history of the origin of the Gäubahn

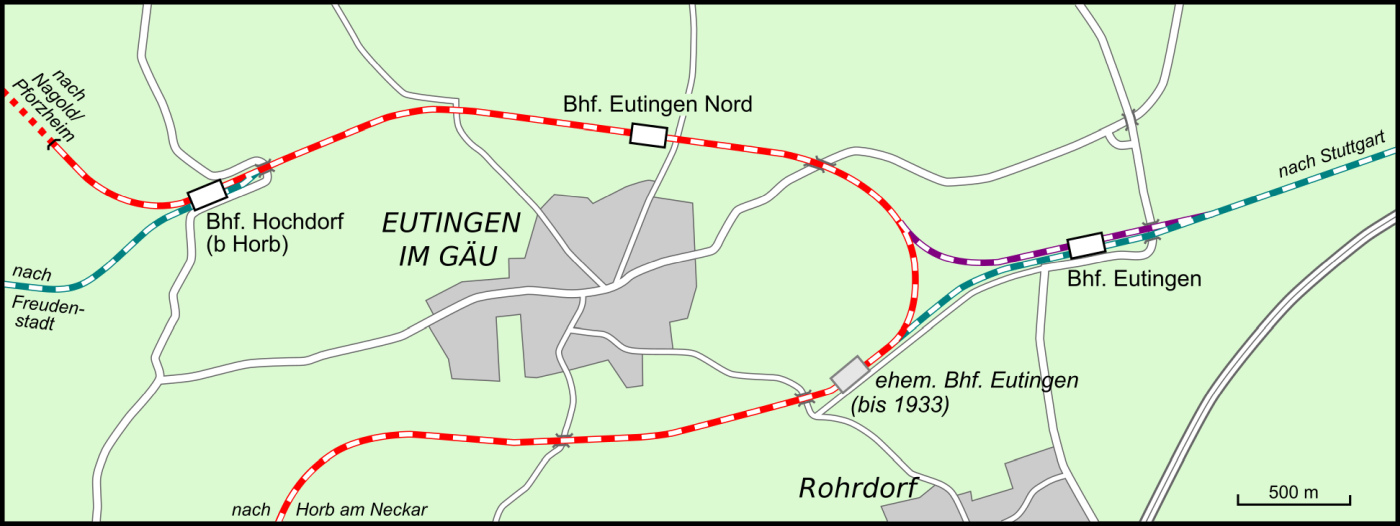
Construction history of the railway lines around Eutingen im Gäu

The term Gäubahn (Gau Railway) is used in table 740 of Deutsche Bahn's timetable, which covers the route from Stuttgart to Singen (Hohentwiel) and Freudenstadt. It consists of the Stuttgart–Horb railway (VzG line number 4860), the Horb–Tuttlingen section of the Plochingen–Immendingen railway (4600), the Tuttlingen–Hattingen railway (4661), the Hattingen–Singen (Hohentwiel) section of the Black Forest Railway (4250) and the Eutingen im Gäu–Freudenstadt section of the Eutingen im Gäu–Schiltach railway line (4880). Its name is derived from the various Gäu landscapes it crosses: the Korngäu (cereal-growing Gäu), which merges into the Obere Gäue (Upper Gäus) at Herrenberg, and finally the Hecken- und Schlehengäu near Eutingen im Gäu.

It is part of the overall network of the Trans-European Networks.

== History ==
Historically, the name Gäubahn, also spelled Gäu-Bahn, only referred to the line between Stuttgart and Freudenstadt, which opened in 1879. In the 1930s, the term was extended to include the Eutingen im Gäu–Horb am Neckar section, which was formerly part of the Nagold Valley Railway. The expression became common in the 1950s for the section from Horb am Neckar to Singen (Hohentwiel) before Deutsche Bahn started using it in the headings of the corresponding timetable tables in the mid-1990s.
