= Eutingen im Gäu =

- Municipality
- Coat of arms

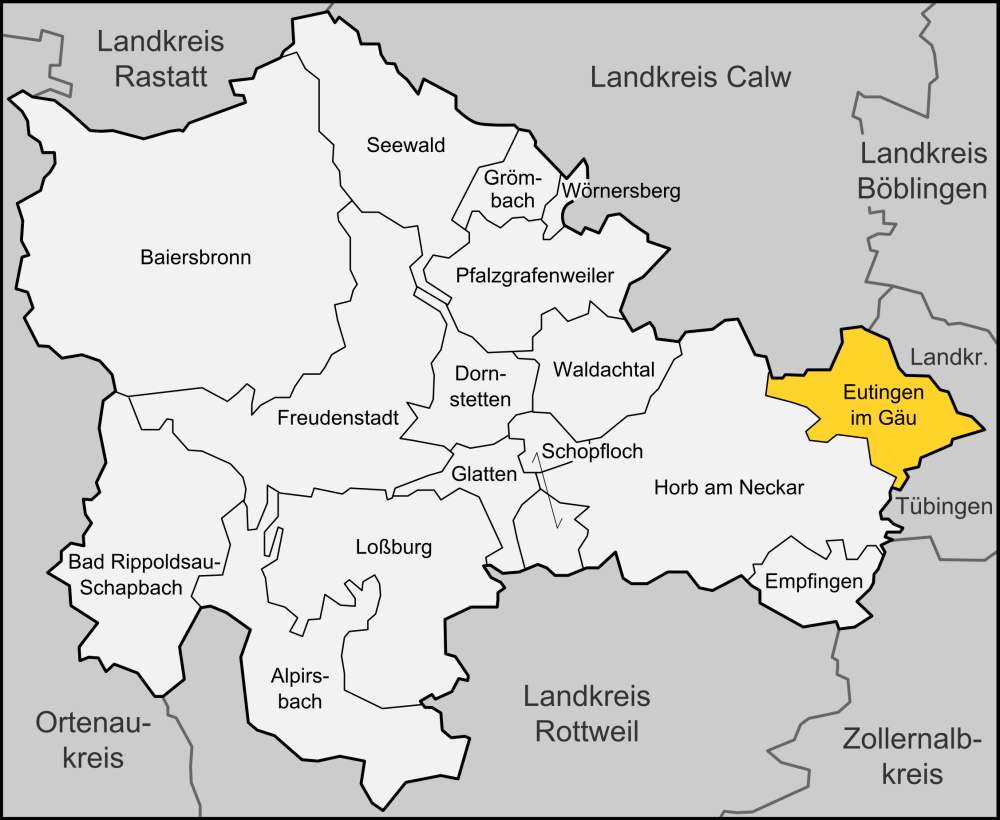
- Location of Eutingen im Gäu within Freudenstadt district
- Interactive map of Eutingen im Gäu
- Location within Germany Location within Baden-Württemberg
- Coordinates: 48°28′40″N 8°45′0″E
- Country: Germany
- State: Baden-Württemberg
- Admin. region: Karlsruhe
- District: Freudenstadt

Government
  - Mayor (2023–31): Markus Tideman

Area
  - Total: 32.82 km^{2} (12.67 sq mi)
- Elevation: 457 m (1,499 ft)

Population (2025-12-31)
  - Total: 6,112
  - Density: 186.2/km^{2} (482.3/sq mi)
- Time zone: UTC+01:00 (CET)
  - Summer (DST): UTC+02:00 (CEST)
- Postal codes: 72184
- Dialling codes: 07457, 07459
- Vehicle registration: FDS, HCH, HOR, WOL
- Website: www.eutingen-im-gaeu.de

Eutingen im Gäu (German pronunciation: [ˈɔʏtɪŋən ʔɪm ˈɡɔʏ], lit. 'Eutingen in the Gäu'; Swabian: Eudinge) is a municipality in the district of Freudenstadt in Baden-Württemberg in southern Germany.

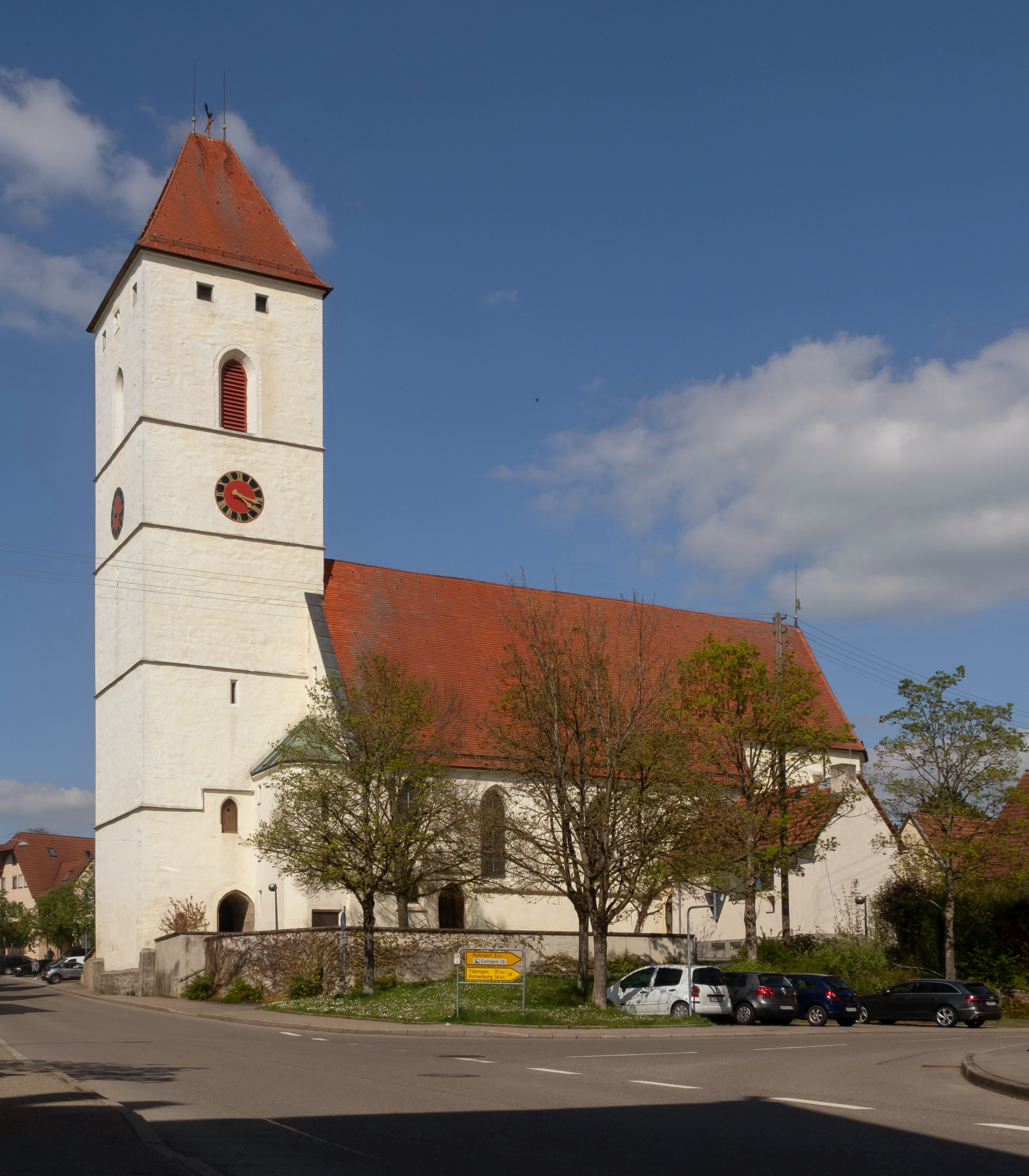
Eutingen im Gäu, church: Kirche Sankt Stephanus

== Notable people ==
- Olaf Saile (1901–1952), was a German writer
