= Cappy Barra Harmonica Band =

American harmonica ensemble

The Cappy Barra Harmonica Band was an American harmonica ensemble — originally a trio, then a quartet, then two groups — that played big band arrangements. Cappy Barra flourished from 1935 to 1945.

== History ==
1938 to 1942

Cappy Barra was assembled by promoter Maurice Duke. The name was derived from "capybara," the largest extant rodent in the world, native to South America. In 1940, Sam Scheckter and Sam Sperling left the group, George Fields replaced Schekter. Shortly after, the act split into two groups. The first unit worked primarily in the Chicago area. A second unit, based in New York, formed around Phil King, who enlisted newcomers George Fields, Charley Leighton, Alan Greene and Pro Robbins (né Irving Rubenstein).

The Chicago unit, a trio, disbanded in 1942 when Nat Bergman and Cappy LaFell enlisted in the Armed Forces. Don Ripps returned to Freeport, Texas.

The New York unit worked steadily in vaudeville and in nightclubs through the war years. George Fields left in 1941 to move to California, and the group played as a trio, with Charles Leighton handling the lead, Alan Greene playing chord harp and singing, and Pro Robbins on bass harp. Phil King booked the band, played an occasional Polyphonia, did comedy bits, and fronted the group. The group disbanded in 1944.

Post World War II

Around 1945, Duke reorganized Cappy Barra as a quartet and moved it to Los Angeles with the aim of getting Hollywood studio work. The performers were Charley Leighton on lead, George Fields on second, Pete Petersen on third, and Pro Robbins on fourth.

Performing members

- Cappy LaFell (né Leon S. Lehrfeld; 1913–2002)
- Joe Mullendore (aka Raymond Joe Sanns, né Joseph Milton Mullendore Jr.; 1914–1990)
- Nat Bergman (aka Nate Burton, né Nathaniel Bergman; 1916–1994)
- Phil Solomon
- Don Ripps (1918–1965)
- Samuel Scheckter (1913–1995)
- Sam Sperling
- George Joseph Fields (1921–2005)
- Charley Leighton (1921–2009)
- Alan Greene
- Pro Robbins (né Irving Rubenstein)
- Pete Petersen
- Milton Freeman
- Eddie Shu (né Edward Shulman; 1918–1986)

Non-performing members

- Maurice Duke (1910–1996).
- Phil King, served as spokesman and leader, but not a musician
- Harry Morton (1912–2004), comedian
- Henry Nemo (1909–1999), composer & arranger

== Filmography ==
- Musical Airwaves (1936, a 10-minute short), Milton Edward Schwarzwald (1891–1950), director, Universal Pictures
- Mad About Music (1938), Universal Pictures
1. I Love to Whistle, by Jimmy McHugh & Harold Adamson (lyrics) (1938), sung by Deanna Durbin with the Cappy Barra Harmonica Band at party (audio clip)
- Pot o' Gold (1941) (video clip; Cappy Barra is dubbed)
- Rockin' in the Rockies (1945) (video clip)
- Radio Stars on Parade (1945) (video clip)
- Bowery Boy (1945)

Musical film shorts

The 1942–44 musicians' strike banned musicians from recording with major labels. A year earlier (1941), the motion picture industry began producing short music films, which were not banned. The films were the early version of music videos — known as "soundies. Cappy Barra performed on the following soundies:
The Smoothies (vocal group) and The Cappy Barra Harmonica Boys
Smoothies personnel: Babs (Blanche Redwine?) and the two brothers, Charlie & Little Ryan (né Reinhart)

1. Showbar Frowlics, assembled and released by Soundies Distributing Corporation of America, Program 1107 (February 22, 1943), re-issued at Program 1187 OCLC 423356297
2. Rosie the Riveter, directed by John C. Graham OCLC 423340319 (February 2, 1943)
3. Lalapaluza Lu OCLC 423101609

== Discography ==
Cappy Barra Harmonica Swing Ensemble

- Recorded April 5, 1937, Variety Recordings (600)

M359 Voo Doo OCLC 78101562
M356 Stardust, by Hoagy Carmichael OCLC 79110814

- 78 rpm, 10-inch (1937)

Casa Loma Stomp, by Gene Gifford OCLC 33255776
Solitude, by Duke Ellington, arranged by Gene Gifford

== Sheet music ==
- Nocturne in Blue, by Al Greene (lyrics) & Raymond Joe Sanns (né Joseph Milton Mullendore Jr.; 1914–1990) (music), © February 11, 1941; 249699 (Joseph Milton Mullendore Jr., Philadelphia)
- Voo Doo, by Raymond Joe Sanns (né Joseph Milton Mullendore Jr.; 1914–1990), Leon Lafell (né Leon S. Lehrfeld; 1913–2002), and Maurice Duke (1910–1996), © June 10, 1937; 62625 (Exclusive Publications, Inc., New York)
- It's Nature All Around Me, by Joseph Milton Mullendore Jr. (1914–1990), © January 18, 1934; 81496 (Leon Lafell; né Leon S. Lehrfeld; 1913–2002)

== See also ==
- The Harmonica Gentlemen
- List of harmonicists

== Other harmonica ensembles ==
United States

- The Harmonica Gentlemen
- The Harmonica Rascals
- The Harmonica Scamps
- The Harmonicuties
- The Harmonica Harlequins
- The Philharmonicas
- The Harlemonicats
- The Three Harpers (see Stan Harper)
- The Harptones
- The Stagg McMann Trio
- The Harmonica Hi-Hats
- The Harmonica Lads
- The Don Henry Trio
- The Harmonica Gang
- The Stereomonics
- The Big Harp

Netherlands

- The 5 Hotchas

Eddie Sernee, Joop Heijman, Geert van Driesten, Cor Belder, Wim Belder

Ireland

- The Bachelors

France

- Trio Raisner

Hong Kong

- King's College Harmonica Band
