= Stan Harper =

American musician (1921–2016)

- Born: Stanley Theodore Wisser; September 2, 1921; Brooklyn, New York, U.S.
- Died: June 29, 2016 (aged 94) New Jersey, U.S.
- Genres: Classical, pop, jazz
- Occupation: Musical artist
- Instrument: Harmonica
- Years active: 1935–2016
- Labels: Coral; Decca; EuClEd apollo

Stanley Harper (né Stanley Theodore Wisser; 2 September 1921 – 29 June 2016) was an American virtuoso classical harmonica artist, arranger, and composer whose performing career spanned eight decades. He died June 29, 2016, in a home for the elderly in New Jersey. He raised the popularity of classical harmonica by influencing composers to write for the instrument and by transcribing serious classical works, himself. Through his virtuosity, he widened the recognition of classical harmonica in solo, chamber, and major orchestral settings.

== Career history ==
Harper began his professional harmonica career in 1935, at age 14. In 1941, he went professionally for a short while by the name Ted Stanley. He went on to perform and record nationally on radio, television, record, theaters, and film until 2015. In the mid to late 1930s, Harper performed with The Harmonica Scamps and Three Harpers, both based in New York City. He apparently only began using the name Stan Harper after World War II. Over the years, he performed with other renown harmonica players and a range of entertainers and artists, including Eddie Shu (Shulman), Carl Reiner, Howard Morris, Hal David, Werner Klemperer, Sam Wanamaker, and Leon Kirchner.

Up until the death of Charley Leighton, Harper was a regular member of a harmonica jam session held every Tuesday at 3 PM at Charley Leighton's apartment in New York City. In addition to Leighton, regulars included Charles Spranklin (Charles Edward Spranklin; born 1932), William Galison, Randy Weinstein, Stanley Silverstone, Gregoire Maret, Phil Caltabelotta, and Rob Paparozzi.

== Selected discography ==
=== LPs and CDs ===
1. The Artistry of Stanley Harper (released after 1966) Side A:
  1. "Serenata"
  2. "I Can't Give You Anything but Love, Baby"
  3. Medley
    1. "Tenderly"
    2. "Misty"
  4. "Southern Medley"
  5. "Charade"
  6. "That Haunting Theme"
  7. "I Don't Want to Walk Without You"
    Harper plays all the parts
  8. Medley from Fiddler on the Roof
    1. "Fiddler on the Roof"
    2. "If I Were a Rich Man"
    3. "Sunrise, Sunset"
    4. "L'Chaim"
  Side B:
  1. Duke Ellington Medley
    1. "Sophisticated Lady"
    2. "Caravan"
    3. "Mood Indigo"
    4. "Satin Doll"
  2. "Jesu, Joy of Man's Desiring"
  3. "Brahm's Lullaby"
    Harper plays a duet with a tiny music box
  4. "Tiger Rag"
  5. "Tosselli's Serenade"
    Enrico Toselli
    (solo on a 1 inch harmonica)
  6. "Peg O' My Heart"
  7. "Poet and Peasant Overture," Von Suppé
2. Stan Harper Plays Bach and Vivaldi
  Musical Heritage Society MHS 4947T (1984)
  OCLC 17229517, 11583632; LCCN 84-743123
  Recorded at JAC Studios, New York City
  1. "Suite no. 2 in B minor for flute, strings, and basso continuo"
    S. 1067," Bach
    Transcribed for flute and piano by Lambros D. Callimahos
  2. "Violin concerto in A minor"
    S. 1041, Bach
    Arrangement and fingering by Eduard Herrmann (1850–1937)
  3. "Flute concerto in D major, op. 10, No. 3: Il cardellino"
    Vivaldi
    Edited by Waldersee and Zanke
3. Stan Harper Plays Mozart and Farnon
  1. Clarinet Concerto in A
    K622, Mozart (with symphony orchestra)
  2. "Prelude and Dance for Harmonica"
    Robert Farnon
4. Stan Harper Plays Fritz Kreisler
  EuClEd, European Classic Editions EC 06 (2009)
  Don Smith, piano
5. Stan Harper Plays the Great Novelettes
  EuClEd, European Classic Editions EC 07 (2009)
  Don Smith, piano

=== Audiocassettes ===
"Stan Harper Plays Mozart and Farnon" (privately published)

Side A: Concerto for Clarinet K622 • W.A. Mozart • First and Second Movements • The Aeolian Orchestra - Dr. Anton Delbec, Conductor • Charles Leighton: Recording Engineer

Side B: 1) Concerto for Clarinet • W.A. Mozart - Third Movement with Orchestra; 2) Prelude and Dance for Harmonica • Robert Farnon • Stan Harper, Harmonica; Don Smith, Piano

=== Singles ===
6. Coral 62388 (45 rpm) (1963)
  Harmonica solo with chorus and orchestra
  Directed by Henry Jerome
  Featuring Stan Harper
  Side 1 (matrix – 114130): "Charade"
  Henry Mancini (music)
  Johnny Mercer (words)
  Side 2 (matrix – 114131): "I Don't Want to Walk Without You"
  Jule Styne (music)
  Frank Loesser (words)
7. Decca 31597 (45 rpm) (1963)
  Harmonica solo with chorus and orchestra
  Henry Jerome & His Chorus & Orchestra
  Featuring Stan Harper
  Side A (matrix – 113858): "That Haunting Theme"
  Mark Cooper (aka Milton Grant) (w&m)
  Lee Reyab (aka Eleanor Jerome) (w&m)

== Publications ==
Stan Harper's Harmonica Repair Manual (For Chromatic and Diatonic) (1970s)

https://www.scribd.com/document/851142322/Stan-Harper-s-Harmonica-Repair-Manual-For-Chromatic-and-Diatonic

== Notable broadcast and live performances ==
- Television – Arthur Godfrey's Talent Scouts, solo appearance, May 7, 1951
- Television – Today, hosted by Hugh Downs, solo appearance, November 24, 1963
- Convention for World Records, New York City, 1977 – Following a performance by Morris Samskin (1924–2000) performing on a 2-inch violin, the world's smallest, Harper performed on a 1-inch harmonica, also the world's smallest. The two performances were chronicled as world records by Ripley's Believe It or Not
- Carnegie Recital Hall, harmonica & piano, Helen Wheaton Benham (born 1941) (piano), (Note: Helen Wheaton Benham, who earned her PhD from Rutgers in 2001, is a concert pianist and music educator; she is the daughter of Charles Mead Benham (1890–1959), who in the 1930s, was head master of the Saint Thomas Choir School in New York City) Saturday, November 6, 1980, 2:30
- Smithsonian Institution, Washington, D.C., solo appearance, 1991, demonstrating his skills using 5 to 6 different sized harmonicas

== Filmography ==
- ...One Third of a Nation..., 1939, harmonica player (uncredited) (A clip is shown in "If You're Not in the Obit, Eat Breakfast". See below.)
- [Uncredited performances in bands appearing in movies from 1940s until the 1960s. He appeared in five or six movie shorts, one including “Pinky” Perelmuth (later known as the celebrated singer Jan Peerce (1904–1984)), who was a violinist then.]
- "Pocket Full of Soul: The Harmonica Documentary" 2013, Omni-Harmonic, LLC (http://pocketfullofsoulmovie.com)
- "If You're Not in the Obit, Eat Breakfast" (An HBO documentary film where 95-year-old comedy legend Carl Reiner tracks celebrated people in their '90s. Started airing on June 5, 2017. http://www.hbo.com/documentaries/if-youre-not-in-the-obit-eat-breakfast)

== Legacy and honors ==
Hering Harmonicas, hand maker of diatonic and chromatic harmonicas, located in Blumenau, Santa Catarina, Brazil, started producing in 2009 a popular model bearing Harper's name: The Stan Harper Chromatic 56, a three-octave, 14-hole instrument with 56 brass reeds sealed by a pearwood body bolted to a hardwood comb with chrome-plated cover plates, mouthpiece and slide assembly. The Hering Harmonica Company worked with Stan to produce a 3.5 octave chromatic harmonica (14 holes). It is unique in that once can play classical music on it easily, since it starts with a “G” note; that unique element was Stan Harper’s idea.

Stan Harper Award of Special Merit, was originally established as the SPAH Award of Special Merit. SPAH is the Society for the Preservation and Advancement of the Harmonica. The award honors individuals, non-players, and organizations that have made outstanding or unique contributions to the global harmonica community. In 2015, SPAH officially renamed it the Stan Harper Award of Special Merit to honor legendary chromatic harmonica virtuoso Stan Harper. Recipients are mentioned here: https://spah.org/about/spah-award-recipients/

== Selected published music ==
- "Baby Sitter Polka," music by Stan Harper, Dana Music Co., 115 W 45 St., New York, New York, © May 2, 1952
- "Mosquito Polka," music by Stan Harper, Dana Music Co. © April 28, 1952
- Composed the musical score for "And Now Miguel" (1966).

== Popular culture ==
- The Guinness Book of World Records, 1978 edition (p. 222), 1979 edition (p. 223), and the 1982 edition (p. 232)-and possibly also the years in between, show a photograph of Stan Harper playing the largest harmonic, the Hohner 48 Chord Harmonica, which, when separated, measures 4 feet long. it has 384 separate holes and can play in a total of 48 major, minor and diminished chords.

== Family ==
Stanley Theodore Wisser grew up in a Jewish home and was the youngest of six born to a Ukrainian-born American father, Abraham Wisser (né Konvisser) (1879-1955), and Moldovan-born American mother, Rose (née Kramer; 1885-1950) — his father was born in a village near Nizhyn, Ukraine, and his mother in Briceni, Moldova. His mother came from a family of cantors.

Harper had been a widower of Era Maria Tognoli (1919–2011), a 1940s opera soprano who, in 1959, founded the Metro Lyric Opera Company in Allenhurst, New Jersey, and for 52 years (until her death), directed it. Harper and Tongoli were married March 17, 1964, in Asbury Park, New Jersey.
