= Winn Schwartau =

American computer security expert (born 1952)

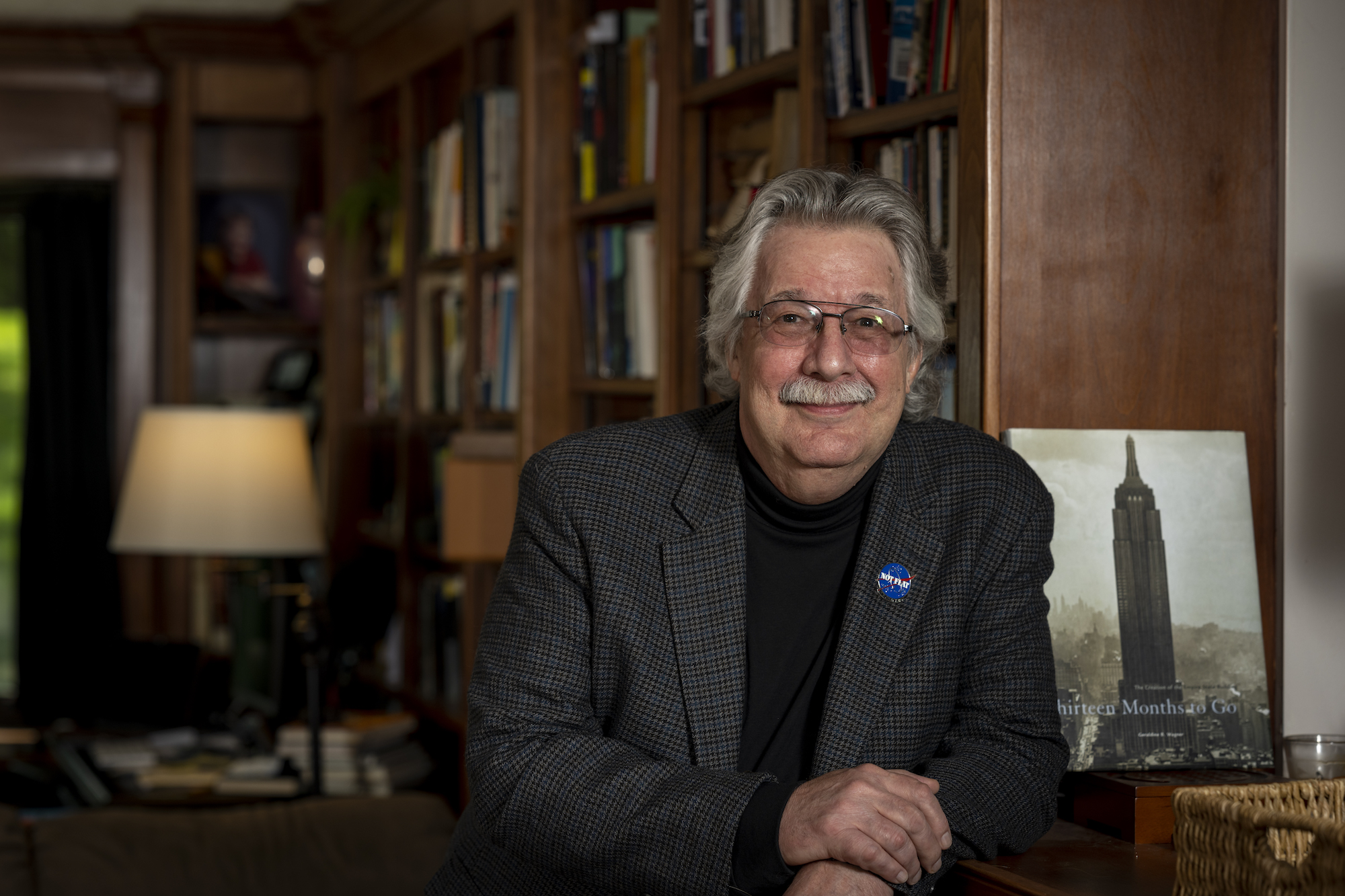
- Winn in his library
- Born: July 1, 1952 (age 72); New York City
- Occupation(s): Computer security Writer, Theoretician
- Website: Schwartau's personal website

Winn Schwartau (born July 1, 1952) is a computer security analyst who focuses on internet security, internet privacy, infowar, cyber-terrorism and related topics.

Schwartau coined the term "Electronic Pearl Harbor" while testifying before Congress in 1991. Schwartau has published several books.

In 2002, Schwartau was honored as a “Power Thinker” and one of the 50 most powerful people in networking by Network World. In 2008, he was voted one of the 25 Most Influential People in the Security Industry by Security Magazine.

== Early life ==
Winn is the son of audio engineer and producer Bill Schwartau and Mary Caroline Bell, the first female audio engineer at NBC during World War II. At 16, he began his professional audio-video career and worked at studios including Mirasound Studios in New York, A&R Recording with Phil Ramone, The Hit Factory, Electric Lady Studios. He engineered 96 live concert broadcasts from The Lone Star Cafe 1978-1981.

== Written work ==
His 1991 cyber-terrorism book, Terminal Compromise, outlines a cyber-terrorist attack on the U.S. using 1980s technology. It was updated in 2001 to Pearl Harbor Dot Com.

His first non-fiction book, Information Warfare: Chaos on the Electronic Superhighway (1994, 1996, 1997) discusses cyberterrorism and cyberwar with governments and the private sector. Cybershock (2000, 2001) is a non-technical look at hackers, information warriors, hacking technologies, and offensive cyber capabilities. In Time Based Security, Schwartau added math and outlines the principles of using time as a prime security metric.

As a parent of children growing up with technology, he wrote Internet and Computer Ethics for Kids (and Parents and Teachers Without a Clue) (2001/2002). Dr. Fred Cohen, from all.net, described this book as "the best security book ever written".

His latest work, Analogue Network Security, formalized the mathematics and principles of creating provably secure cyber and physical environments. In February 2021, it was named "the Best CyberSecurity Book of all Time" by Cyber Defense Magazine.

== Entrepreneurial career ==
Schwartau has said that he wants the United States to put more emphasis on computer security. He recalled in 1996 that some of his ideas were not taken seriously despite what he believed to be demonstrable threats.

In 2001, Winn was labeled one of the Network World major "Power Thinkers". In 2007, SC Magazine labeled him one of the Top 5 Security Thinkers.

SC Magazine called him the "civilian architect of information warfare", and Security Magazine identified him as one of the 25 most influential people in the security industry.

Schwartau was the Chairman of the Board of Mobile Active Defense, specializing in security and compliance for smartphones and tablets, and was president and founder of The Security Awareness Company (formerly known as Interpact, Inc. sold to KnowBe4 in 2017), which develops security awareness programs for private and public organisations.

Currently, Schwartau is the Chief Visionary Officer for SAC Labs, a division of KnowBe4. He also founded InfowarCon (1994) and Trusted Learning (2003), and co-founded SCIPP International (2007)

- Fellow, the Royal Society of the Arts
- Distinguished Fellow, Ponemon Institute
- Inducted 2019 ISSA International Hall of Fame
- Top 100 Cybersecurity Influencers at RSA Conference 2019 (#66 out of 42,000 attendees)
