= Duet (Neal Hefti composition) =

"Duet" is a 1957 (©1958) big band swing composition and arrangement by Neal Hefti that was part of his larger body of work for the Count Basie Orchestra. His arrangement features two muted trumpets, which – when first recorded in 1957 on The Atomic Mr. Basie – featured Thad Jones and Joe Newman.

== Discography and videography ==
=== Discography ===
Session / performance date	Artist (leader)	Album or Single	Label (Catalog No.)	Studio (Venue)	Matrix No.
21 & 22 October 1957	Count Basie and His Orchestra (audio)	The Atomic Mr. Basie; Joe Newman; Thad Jones (soloists)	Roulette EPR 1520	Capitol (Note: Basie's session for the Atomic album was at Capitol Studios Studio A (Capitol Records, Inc.), located in the Theater District, Midtown Manhattan, on the first floor (one floor up) in the 14-story Eaves Building at 151 West 46th Street. That studio, as a Capitol studio, flourished from 1949 to 1961. The Eaves Costume Company – still in existence, founded by Albert Grammer Eaves (1847–1900) in 1863 (162 years ago) – occupied the ground floor. The Eaves Costume Company built the building and opened it May 1, 1928. (The Sound Studies Reader, Jonathan Sterne, ed., Routledge, 2012, pps. 310–311; OCLC 916524063)); New York ("Duet" Session No. 12472-14)	R52003A (Side A)
9 & 12 November 1957	Count Basie and His Orchestra; Featuring Joe Williams	Autumn in Paris; Joe Newman; Thad Jones (soloists)	Magic Records (E)AWE13	Live; The Olympia; Paris	
24 June – 3 July 1958	Count Basie and His Atomic Band; Featuring Joe Williams	Count on the Coast; Featuring Joe Williams (Vol. 2)	Phontastic (Swd)7555 (Stockholm); Jazz Hour (Eu)JHR73543	Live; The Crescendo (Note: On June 30, July 1 and 2, 1958, the Basie Band – before closing at the Crescendo – was used to back Nat King Cole for his album, Welcome to the Club, on Capitol. For contractual reasons, Basie did not perform with his band on the album (Sheridan 1986, p. 498).); West Hollywood	PHONT 7555 B (Side B)
14 January 1961	Karel Krautgartner; Jazzový Orchester	Taneční Orchestr Československý Rozhlasu (Czech Radio Dance Orchestra)	Supraphon DV 10119	Prague	VM 2291 (Side A)
1964	Neal Hefti and His Orchestra (audio at 6:45)	The Leisurely Loveliness of Neal Hefti and His Orchestra	Movietone MTM1006		MTS 2006 A (Side A)
1965	Jean Leccia (fr); French lyrics by Jeannine "Mimi" Perrin and Pierre Saka (fr)	"Duet" (45 rpm)	Disc AZ (fr) EP 977; Disques Vogue (distributor)		AZ 977
10 December 1966	Wild Bill Davison (audio)	Memories	Jazzology JCD-201	Live; Deansgate; Manchester, England	
13 December 1966	Wild Bill Davison	Wild Bill Davison!	Fontana (E)TL5413	London	
27 October 1967	Wild Bill Davison	I'll Be a Friend With Pleasure	Fat Cat's Jazz FCJ106	Live; Manassas Jazz Festival; Manassas, Virginia	
18 November 1967	Wild Bill Davison; With Alex Welsh and His Band (audio)	Fidgety Feet	Jazzology JCD-231	Live; Manchester Sports Guild; Manchester, England	
11 December 1978	Fessor's (Ole "Fessor" Lindgreen (sv)); Big City Jazz Band; Featuring Bill Davison (audio)	Wild Bill Davison with Fessor's Big City Jazz Band	Storyville (Dan) SLP 421 (1997 re-release: STCD 5525)	Copenhagen	
May 1984	Joe Newman and Joe Wilder	Hangin' Out "Duet" arranged by Frank Foster	Concord Jazz CJ-262	JAC Studios; New York	
3 November 1994; 7 & 21 March 1995	The Frank Capp Juggernaut (audio)	In a Hefti Bag; Conte Candoli; Snooky Young (soloists)	Concord Jazz CCD-4655 (CD)	Sage & Sound; Hollywood	CCD 4655 01

=== Videography ===
Session / performance date	Artist (leader)	Featuring	Label (Catalog No.)	Studio (Venue)	Archival source
25 October 2009	Jazz Company Big Band; Directed by Gabriele Comeglio (it) (video)	"Duet" (video); Emilio Soana; Pippo Colucci (soloists)		Live; Teatro Martinetti (it); Garlasco, Italy	YouTube

== Sheet and folio music, arrangements and transcriptions ==
Fake books

- Music of Neal Hefti: Fake Book (3 Vols., E♭, B♭, C), Warner Bros. Music (1991); OCLC 896685811

For E♭ instruments: OCLC 472179616, 1100295729
For B♭ instruments: OCLC 25757824
For concert pitch instruments: OCLC 25757786

- The Real Book of Blues, Jack Long (ed.), London: Wise Publications (an imprint of Music Sales Group) (1999); OCLC 862606850, 716149208, 401513490, 474857732

See: Real Book

Note: By inclusion of the "Duet" lead sheet in jazz oriented fake books, one might infer that it is a jazz standard, or one might infer that the editor or publisher is offering it as such.

Solo instruments

- Neal Hefti Originals for Piano, Neal Hefti Music (1966); OCLC 7479858

Big band

- For big band, transcription of Hefti's arrangement by Jon Harpin (©1986); includes transcribed solos of Joe Newman and Thad Jones from the Basie's 1957 Atomic album.

Encino Music, USA, Warner / Chappel Music Ltd., London, reproduced by permission of International Music Publications Ltd.

2 E♭ altos, 2 B♭ tenors, 1 E♭ bari; 4 B♭ trumpets; 2 B♭ tenor trombones, 1 B♭ bass trombone, 1 optional B♭ tenor trombone; guitar, piano, bass, drums with brushes
Moderate blues in E♭ 4/4 = 96 Swing
