= Hangin' Out (Joe Newman and Joe Wilder album) =

Studio album by Joe Newman and Joe Wilder
- Released: 1984
- Recorded: May 1984
- Studio: JAC Studios, New York, NY and PER, San Francisco, CA
- Genre: Jazz
- Length: 38:40
- Label: Concord Jazz; CJ-262
- Producer: Carl Jefferson

Joe Wilder chronology
Jazz From Peter Gunn (1959)	Hangin' Out (1984)	Alone With Just My Dreams (1991)

Joe Newman chronology
I Love My Baby (1978)	Hangin' Out (1984)	A Grand Night for Swingin (1992)

Hangin' Out is an album by jazz trumpeters Joe Newman and Joe Wilder recorded in 1984 and released on the Concord Jazz label.

== Reception ==
Professional ratings
Review scores
Source	Rating
Allmusic	4/5 stars

The Allmusic review by Scott Yanow stated: "the results are swinging, lyrical, melodic and well-balanced".

== Track listing ==
1. "The Midgets" (Joe Newman) – 4:49
2. "Here's That Rainy Day" (Jimmy Van Heusen, Johnny Burke) – 4:01
3. "Duet" (Neal Hefti) – 4:12
4. "Battle Hymn of the Republic" (Traditional) – 6:08
5. "Secret Love" (Sammy Fain, Paul Francis Webster) – 5:09
6. "You've Changed" (Bill Carey, Carl Fischer) – 5:37
7. "'Lypso Mania" (Frank Foster) – 4:39
8. "He Was Too Good to Me" (Richard Rodgers, Lorenz Hart) – 4:05

== Personnel ==
- Joe Newman – trumpet
- Joe Wilder – trumpet, flugelhorn
- Hank Jones – piano
- Rufus Reid – bass
- Marvin "Smitty" Smith – drums
