= Charles Leighton =

American harmonica player

- Born: June 24, 1921
- Died: June 26, 2009 (aged 88)
- Genres: Jazz, classical
- Occupations: Musician, audio engineer
- Instrument: Harmonica
- Years active: 1940–2009
- Label: JAC Recording

Charles Leighton (24 June 1921 – 26 June 2009) was an American classical and jazz harmonica player who performed from the mid-1940s to the mid-1950s. After a hiatus while he managed a recording studio, he performed again in the 1980s until his death. He performed as a soloist and as a member of international ensembles. He worked as a studio musician for radio, film, and television.

In the 1950s, Leighton founded JAC Recording, a small recording studio in his apartment in Manhattan. Several years later, the studio hired record producer Phil Ramone, who was mentored by Leighton and other audio engineers. Ramone attributes his love of engineering to Leighton.

== Career ==
Charles Leighton, a native New Yorker, taught himself to play the harmonica at the age of twelve. At age sixteen (1937), he toured the U.S., playing lead harmonica in vaudeville theaters with harmonica groups such as the Philharmonicas and the Cappy Barra Harmonica Gentlemen. During the early 1940s, he worked in Hollywood, both in the studio and on screen, appearing in motion pictures for Columbia and RKO. He played country music on the radio with the Hollywood Barn Dance and The Hoagy Carmichael Show. He recorded with the Andrews Sisters, Johnny Bond, Merle Travis, and the Riders of the Purple Sage.

Leighton served in the U.S. Coast Guard during World War II. After the war, he returned to New York and signed with USO Camp Shows and toured throughout Japan, Korea, and China, entertaining the military. While in the Coast Guard, he formed a trio with Harry Halicki and Joe Pittello. They toured after the war in the show Tars and Spars. They performed with Henry Morgan, Paul Whiteman, and Kay Kyser. After touring with the USO, Leighton returned to New York City to work as a studio musician, playing on radio and television commercials and recording with Harry Belafonte, Hugh Downs, Clint Eastwood, Andre Kostelanetz, Dean Martin, Mitch Miller, Dinah Shore, and Dionne Warwick.

In the 1950s Leighton co-founded and operated JAC Recording, Inc., a recording studio, and abandoned performing. Years later a friend asked him to practice and record a harmonica transcription of a flute solo called "Poem" by Charles Griffes. Never having heard the piece and underestimating its difficulty, Leighton agreed to do it. He produced a studio recording, which motivated him to record a classical music album.

For nearly 30 years until his death, Leighton hosted jam sessions at his apartment every Tuesday. He called it "Tuesdays at Leighton's". Members included Charles Spranklin, William Galison, Randy Weinstein, Stan Harper, Stanley Silverstone, Gregoire Maret, Phil Caltabelotta, and Rob Paparozzi.

== Discography ==
=== As leader ===
1. Classical (Mega Mouth, 2000) (Note: Tabby Andriello, also known as Frank Andriello (né Rocco Carmelo Andriello; 1920–1988), was a musician and an award-winning studio sound effects specialist)
2. Angel Eyes, (Mega Mouth, 2001)

=== As sideman ===
3. Herb Shriner on Stage, Herb Shriner (Columbia, 1955)
  - Musicians: Dominic (Don Henry) Quagenti, Cham-Ber Huang (1925–2014), Charles Leighton, Frank (Moose) Mitkowski, Victor Pankowitz (né Victor Paulukewich; 1919–2000), Alan Pogson (né Joseph Alan Pogson; 1915–2006), Alan (Blackie) Schackner (né Irving Schackner; 2013–2013)
4. The Fi Is Hi, Eddy L. Manson (1958)
  - Musicians: Charles Leighton, Alan (Blackie) Schackner (né Irving Schackner; 2013–2013), Alan Pogson (né Joseph Alan Pogson; 1915–2006), Michael Chimes (1914–1970) (harmonicas); Eddy Manson (né Eddy Lawrence Manson; 1919–1996) (leader & arranger)
5. Harmonica Holiday, Richard Hayman (Mercury, 1961)
  - Harmonica: Alan (Blackie) Schackner, Alan Pogson, Chamber Huang, Charles Leighton, Eddy Manson (né Eddy Lawrence Manson; 1919–1996) (David's father), Leonard Schwartz, Michael Chimes, Richard Hayman
  - Other musicians: Accordion – Dominic Cortese (accordion), William Costa (accordion), Milt Hinton (bass), Maurice Brown (cello), Arthur Marotti (drums), Bob Rosengarden, Phil Kraus, Tony Mottola (guitar), Moe Wechsler (piano), Mac Ceppos (1905–1990) (violin)
  - Liner notes: Hal Mooney
  - Producer: Hal Mooney
  - Arranger: Richard Hayman
6. Marlene Van Planck loves Johnny Mercer (Audiophile, 1979)
7. Sings Cole Porter, Dionne Warwick (Arista, 1990)
  - Musicians include Robbie Kondor, Joe Mardin, Rob Mounsey, Clint de Ganon, Wayne Pedziwiatr (it), Jeffrey Mironov, Lou Marini, Charles Leighton
8. Double Standards, Jane Scheckter (1993)
9. Not That Different, Natalie Douglas (1999)
10. Angel on a Harp, Susan Rosenberg (Mega Mouth, 1999)

=== As engineer ===
11. The Joe Newman Memorial Album, Joe Newman (1962)
12. The New York Saxophone Quartet, New York Saxophone Quartet (1980)
13. Don't You Know Me? Anne Marie Moss, (1981)
14. Time to Jump and Shout, Widespread Depression Orchestra, (1981)
15. A Swinging Case of Masso-Ism, George Masso (1981)
16. Children Are People, Tony Randall (1977)
17. Roaring Back into New York, New York, Bill Watrous (1983)
18. New York Jam, Phil Bodner (1981)
19. The Peacocks, Jimmy Rowles (1983)
20. A Swingin' Dream, Buck Clayton (1988)
21. Loves Johnny Mercer, Marlene VerPlanck (1988)
  - Musicians: Marlene VerPlanck, Tony Monte (de), Bucky Pizzarelli, Milt Hinton, Butch Miles (drums), Charlie Leighton, Brian Koonin, George H. Buck
    1. First session recorded at JAC Recording, New York, New York, September 1978, published and distributed by Audiophile Records (1979)
    2. Second session recorded at Rockland Studio, New York, New York, August 2, 1988
22. Now and Forever/Love Being Here With You, Helen Forrest (1989)
23. A Memorial, Mary Osborne (1992)
24. Rhythm Encounters, Red Norvo (1996)
25. Oh What a Memory We Made Tonight, Peggy King (1997)
26. Carmel Quinn's Ireland, Carmel Quinn (2001)

== Publications ==
- Charles Leighton, Introduction to Jazz for the Chromatic Harmonica (book & audio tape), arranged and accompanied by Ted Simons on piano, The F & R Farrell Company (publisher & distributor), (Note: The F & R Farrell Company, which sold harmonicas, closed in 2005 due to declining health of its proprietor, Richard E. Farrell (1920–2007)) Grove City, Ohio (internet & mail-order harmonica retailer, now out of business) (1990) — An audio tape has harmonica alone on one side and harmonica with piano on the other side
