= Bill Schwartau =

American recording engineer (1926–1985)

- Born: William Herman Carlos Schwartau June 22, 1926; New York City
- Died: October 31, 1985 (aged 59) New York City
- Occupations: Audio engineer, record producer

William Herman Carlos Schwartau (22 June 1926, in New York City – 31 October 1985, in New York City) was an American recording engineer. He engineered artists such as Ray Charles, Peter, Paul & Mary, Bill Evans, Herbie Mann and Duke Ellington. Schwartau was a mentor to engineer Phil Ramone, who called Schwartau "one of the unsung heroes of our industry". Schwartau worked for NBC, Decca, Coastal Recording Studio (which dissolved in 1959), and Music Makers.

== Education ==
Schwartau started MIT in 1942. He pledged with the Phi Kappa fraternity and was expected to graduate in 1946.

== Military service ==
Schwartau served in the US Navy. He was given a leave of absence in 1944. In 1945, he was promoted to Radio Technician (RT 3/C). He returned in 1946 after serving as an Electronic Technician's Mate (ETM 2/C) on the USS John A. Bole. At that time, the destroyer was patrolling near China, Japan, Okinawa, and Korea. According to his son, Winn, Schwartau worked on developing the oscilloscope and on radar systems in the military.

== Career ==
Schwartau worked for NBC in 1942 in Guest Relations. After serving in the military, he joined NABET (the broadcasting union) in 1949 and started working at NBC in 1950. He was with Decca Records (start date unknown) until later 1953.

He was working at Coastal Recording when he was appointed Chief Engineer at A&R Recording in New York in December 1958 (Phil Ramone was a co-founder). The first major album recorded at the studio was The Genius of Ray Charles, which was engineered by Tom Dowd and Schwartau with Phil Ramone as "third assistant."

Ramone said of Schwartau in his autobiography, "Bill Schwartau was one of the unsung heroes of our industry, and every recording professional on the East Coast admired him. His ability to hear 'through the microphone' was impeccable; and when Bill set up a session, what you heard in the studio matched what you heard in the control room. He used microphones and aural shading to convey subtlety and nuance in the same way a painter uses light and color."

In 1959, Schwartau was hired as sound engineer at Music Makers "to attempt to crack the obstacles of poor sound transfers in commercial prints. It was announced he was promoted to Vice President of production at Music Makers in 1960. In 1962, he was named production supervisor and chief engineer of Sound Maker's Studio. He also engineered the influential jazz album Money Jungle with Duke Ellington, Charles Mingus and Max Roach.

== Personal life ==
Not long after he started working at NBC (in 1950), he met engineer Mary Caroline Bell. The two married six weeks later. Since that wasn't allowed by the company, Mary was reassigned to the 4th floor (where she was the broadcast engineer and editor for the nightly news). The two were only married seven years but had a son, Winn Schwartau. Winn says he was editing tapes at their home studio when he was 5 years old. His mother, Mary Caroline Bell said he started editing 1/4" tapes at 6 years old.

He married Carolyn Leibersberger in 1958.

Schwartau died in 1985 after a long illness.
