= Eddie Shu =

American jazz musician and ventriloquist

- Born: Edward Shulman; August 18, 1918; New York City
- Died: July 4, 1986 (aged 67) St. Petersburg, Florida
- Genres: Jazz
- Occupation: Musician
- Instruments: Saxophone, clarinet, trumpet
- Years active: 1940s–death
- Formerly of: Cappy Barra Harmonica Band

Eddie Shu (ne Edward Shulman; 18 August 1918 New York City – 4 July 1986) was an American jazz musician who played saxophone, clarinet, trumpet, harmonica, and accordion. He was also a comedic ventriloquist.

== Career ==
Shu learned violin and guitar as a child before picking up saxophone as a teenager. His professional career began in 1935 in Brooklyn. For the seven years leading up to his service in the United States Army, he performed in vaudeville and as a ventriloquist in night clubs and a harmonica player with the Cappy Barra Harmonica Band.

Shu played in bands while serving in the Army from 1942 to 1945. He performed with Maurice Evans in the Pacific. He enlisted in the Army with Stan Harper, and they were assigned to a unit that entertained troops. After Shu's discharge from the Army, he performed with Tadd Dameron (1947), George Shearing, Johnny Bothwell, Buddy Rich, Les Elgart, Lionel Hampton (1949–1950), Charlie Barnet, Chubby Jackson, and Gene Krupa (1954–1958). He performed with Lionel Hampton's Orchestra at the Cavalcade of Jazz concert at Wrigley Field in Los Angeles which was produced by Leon Hefflin, Sr. on July 10, 1949, and also at Lane Field in San Diego on Sept. 3, 1949.

In the 1960s Shu moved to Florida, playing locally as well as with Louis Armstrong's All-Stars, Hampton, and Krupa again. He was a member of the vocal jazz group Rare Silk in 1980. During this period, he performed with this group in Boulder, Colorado, and in a Department of Defense tour. His final recording was "Shu-Swings" with the Joe Delaney Trio.

Shu died in 1986 in St Petersburg, Florida.

== Movie dispute ==
Carol Shulman, the widow of Eddie Shu, filed suit against Andy García, et al. in Los Angeles Superior Court, claiming he stole the identity of her late husband for the film The Lost City. The film centers on a Cuban nightclub owner fleeing the country's oppressive regime for New York. Shulman claimed Eddie Shu was exiled from Cuba in 1958 for exercising freedom of expression after Fidel Castro came into power.

In 1957 a group of musicians, disc jockeys, and jazz fans joined in Havana City to exchange experiences with North American musicians. The main venues were Havana 1900 and the Tropicana. Funds collected were used by the Jazz Cuban Club to bring jazz musicians to the island. These musicians included Eddie Shu, Kenny Drew, and Philly Joe Jones.

== Discography ==
=== As leader ===
- I Only Have Eyes For Shu (Bethlehem, 1955)

=== As sideman ===
With Gene Krupa

- The Rocking Mr. Krupa (Clef, 1954)
- The Gene Krupa Quartet (Clef, 1955)
- Drummer Man Gene Krupa in Highest Fi (Verve, 1956)
- Jazz at the Philharmonic (American Recording Society, 1956)
- Jazz Rhythms of Gene Krupa (American Recording Society, 1956)
- Hey...Here's Gene Krupa (Verve, 1959)

With others

- Lionel Hampton, Hamp Stamps (Glad-Hamp, 1967)
- "Eddie Shu/Bob Hardaway: "Jazz Practitioners" (Bethlehem Records, BCP-3)
