= The Harmonica Gentlemen =

American music trio

The Harmonica Gentlemen was a trio consisting of George Fields (chromatic harmonica), Leo Friedman (chord harmonica), and Don Ripps (bass harmonica). They are largely remembered now for recording with The Andrews Sisters and Danny Kaye. George Fields had a solo career as harmonicist and is best known for his harmonica solo "Moon River" in Henry Mancini's score for Breakfast at Tiffany's. Donn Ripps was a former member of the Borrah Minevitch Harmonica Rascals the Cappy Barra Harmonica Gentlemen The Harmonica Boys and last The Harmonica Ripples. Leo Friedman was a former Borrah Minevitch Harmonica Rascals and performed in the movie Topman in 1943 when Sammy Ross had replaced Johnny Puleo.
