= A & R Recording =

1958–1989 American independent recording studio

A & R Recording Inc. was a major American independent studio recording company founded in 1958 by Jack Arnold (Note: Jack Arnold (aka Jack Aaron; né Jacob Aaron; 1922–1968). (Wasserman, 2000, pg. 134; see References below)) and Phil Ramone.

== History ==
Before founding A & R Recording in 1958, Arnold and Ramone had been working at JAC Recording, Inc.; Arnold had been a partner at JAC. The "A" and "R" initials were derived from their surnames. But also, Arnold and Ramone relished the idea that their initials and company name matched the industry acronym for "artist and repertoire," an important avocation in the recording industry.

Jack Arnold ended his association with A & R Recording shortly after co-founding it, due to health issues.

=== Original A & R studio – 112 West 48th Street ===
The original studio was in Midtown Manhattan, New York City, on the fourth floor of Mogull's Film & TV (Note: Mogull Bros. Electrical Corp., incorporated in New York in 1923, sold radios. The incorporators were Charles (1898–1986), Leo (1894–1962), and Peter Mogull (1892–1964). Out of that, the brothers founded the Film Library, a pro and retail film sales and rentals, cinema equipment, and camera firm, first at 68 W 48th Street, then, as of 1951, at 122 W 48th Street. When A & R Recording leased its first studio at 122 W 48th, the only surviving brother, Charles, was the landlord. One of Charlie's son's, Artie Mogull (1927–2004), had been an executive for M. Witmark & Sons and a notable A&R executive producer of many rising stars in jazz and rock, among whom included Bob Dylan. In 1950, Mogull's Camera & Film Exchange Inc. sold the building at 112-114 West 48th St. to Kenchal Estates Inc. (The New York Times, September 23, 1950; see References) In 1944, the building at 112-114 W 48th St. was sold by The City Bank Farmers Trust Company to 112 West 48th Street, Inc., Frederick Dreier, president. ("$77,500 Consideration," The Sun, July 10, 1944, pg. 22, col. 7) Past tenants at 112-114 W 48th St. include: 1. Winitzki Chess Club (1942), Eugenie Club (1925); 2. In 1929, it was the Green Room Grill, one of the largest speakeasies in the Theatre District. The Friar's Club, at 106-108-110 W 48th Street, was next door; 3. In 1942, the building housed the Musical Instrument Exchange, Inc., operated by Samuel Goodman, aka Kelly Goodman; 4. Soloman Pfeiffer (1881–1936), seller of imported violins (from the late 1890s to about 1925)) building at 112 West 48th Street. The studio was named "Studio A1." Manny's Music (Note: Manny Goldrich (né Manuel Kaufman Goldrich; 1904–1968), originally a saxophone salesman, founded Manny's Musical Instruments & Accessories Inc. in 1933 on West 48th Street. In 1940 though 1959, the address was 120 W 48th St. The store endured under three generations of Goldriches. In 1999, The Goldrich heirs sold the store and the brownstone building at 156 West 48th Street to its chainstore rival across the street, Sam Ash Music, who, in turn, maintained Manny's as a subsidiary and retained its staff and family managers until 2009. Manny's had, until about 1969, been located at 112 West 48th Street.)—a music instrument retailer—was one-half of the first three floors; Mogull's Film & TV was the other half. Jim and Andy's Bar, (Note: Jim & Andy's bar was founded in 1945, presumably by partner's named Jim and Andy. Jim Koulouvaris (né James Daniel Koulouvaris; 1917–1972) bought it in 1955. From 1945 to about 1968, it had been located at 116 West 48th St. Notable employees included Pete Salvato (1908–1969), chief cook for 17 years. Rocky Mareno was Jim's bartender. (see Meet Me At Jim & Andy's in References)) an important hangout for studio musicians was next door at 116 West 48th Street. Ramone installed an intercom from the studio to Jim & Andy's to call for musicians if someone did not show up.

In the first studio, Ramone gained a good reputation as a recording engineer and music producer, particularly for his use of innovative technology. According to David Simons, author, the original studio at 112 West 48th St., which was started on a shoestring budget, remains Ramone's greatest legacy.

The studio was designed for the purpose of doing demos. According to Ramone, the room, 11.5 metres (38 ft) by 12 metres (39 ft), had an incredibly unique sound. He attributed much of it to the height of 3.6 metres (12 ft) and before long clients were requesting to do their final tapes there and in no uncertain terms letting it be known that this was no mere demo studio. In a short period of time, Ramone felt the need to upgrade the equipment.

=== Second studio, Studios A-1 and A-2 – 799 7th Avenue ===
In October 1967, A & R purchased Columbia's Studio A on the seventh floor at 799 7th Avenue at 52nd Street and leased the space, which consisted of about 10,000 square feet (929.0304 m^{2}) Columbia had owned the studio since 1939. The building was demolished in 1983 to make way for Equitable Center West at 787 7th Avenue, currently the BNP Paribas Building. Toronto-born Donald C. Hahn (né Donald Clarence Hahn; 1939–2020), who had been with A & R since 1961, was – effective October 1, 1969 – promoted from Senior Engineer to Vice President of A & R Recording, in charge of supervising the 799 7th Avenue facilities.

Capacities, as published in 1974:
Studio A-1: 40 × 50 feet; height 30 feet – 1,600 square feet (148.6449 m^{2}) – accommodated 90 people
Studio A-2: 25 × 30 feet; height 12 feet – 750 square feet (69.6773 m^{2}) – accommodated 20 people

=== Third studio, Studios R-1 and R-2 – 322 West 48th Street ===
A & R added a third studio in the Leeds Music Corporation building at 322 West 48th Street. A & R became part owner of the building, a 6-story building, and designed recording studios on the first and second floors, named R1 and R2, respectively. The "R" stood for "Ramone." A & R also occupied the basement. 322 West 48th Street is currently the home of American Federation of Musicians Local 802, the New York City musicians' union and the Jazz Foundation of America.

Capacities, as published in 1974:
Studio R-1: 38 × 28 feet; height 13-3/4 feet – 1,064 square feet (98.8488 m^{2}) – accommodated 26 people
Studio R-2: 20 × 25 feet; height 13 feet – 500 square feet (46.4515 m^{2}) – accommodated 12 people

=== Launch of A & R Records ===
In February 1970, A & R Recording launched A & R Records, a company that produced albums of artists that included Paul Simon, Burt Bacharach, Billy Joel, Dionne Warwick, Karen Kamon, Engelbert Humperdinck, George Barnes, Gloria Estefan, Bucky Pizzarelli, Barry Manilow, Laura Branigan, England Dan & John Ford Coley, Tito Puente, Petula Clark, k.d. lang and many more.

=== Satellite studios ===
In 1970, A & R Recording formalized two partnerships to build two satellite studios, one with Brooks Arthur (né Arnold Brodsky; born 1936) (Note: Brooks Arthur — as a songwriter in 1959 — used the pseudonyms Arnie Blaine and Art Barrett. From 1960 on (the last sixty-six years), he has been known as Brooks Arthur.) in Blauvelt, New York, and one with Norman (Norm) Fuller Vincent (1930–2014) in Jacksonville, Florida.

==== 914 Sound Studios ====
The partnership with Arthur was named "914 SRS" and was located at 34 NY Route 303 in Blauvelt. "SRS stood for "Sound Recording Studios." The legal structure of the partnership was in the form of a New York corporation operating as a wholly owned subsidiary of A & R Recording Inc. The entity name was "914 Sound Recording Studios, Inc." The studio, a converted gas station, opened October 1970. Arthur owned one-half; Ramone, Don Frey, (Note: Don Frey, a former senior sound mixer at NBC, was vice president of operations at A & R Recording. Frey, in 1988, was instrumental in rebuilding BMG's Studio A in New York.) and Arthur Downs Ward (1922–2002) owned the other half. They sold it in 1978 and the corporation—914 Sound Recording Studios, Inc.—dissolved in 1982.

==== Vincent SRS ====
The partnership with Norman Vincent, et al. was named "Vincent SRS" and was located in Jacksonville, Florida, and opened November 1970. Vincent was the operator.

=== Closing ===
A & R Recording closed in 1989.

== Selected artists ==
Artists produced by Ramone include

- Clay Aiken
- Burt Bacharach
- The Band
- Bono
- Laura Branigan
- Ray Charles
- Karen Carpenter
- Chicago
- Peter Cincotti
- Natalie Cole
- Chick Corea
- Bob Dylan
- Sheena Easton
- Melissa Errico
- Gloria Estefan
- Aretha Franklin
- Lazarus
- Billy Joel
- Elton John
- Quincy Jones
- Patricia Kaas
- B.B. King
- Julian Lennon
- Shelby Lynne
- Madonna
- Barry Manilow
- Richard Marx
- Paul McCartney
- George Michael
- Liza Minnelli
- Anne Murray
- Olivia Newton-John
- Sinéad O'Connor
- Fito Páez
- Luciano Pavarotti
- Peter, Paul, and Mary
- June Pointer
- André Previn
- Diane Schuur
- Michael Sembello
- Carly Simon
- Paul Simon
- Frank Sinatra
- Rod Stewart
- Barbra Streisand
- James Taylor
- The Guess Who
- Frankie Valli
- Dionne Warwick
- Stevie Wonder
- Nikki Yanofsky

== Neighborhood ==
A&R Recording had two buildings in midtown Manhattan. Within a 10-block area of this part of Manhattan during the disco era existed an epicenter of recording studios, including Mediasound, the Hit Factory, Sony, and the Record Plant at 321 W. 44th Street, with four studios, duplication room, two mobile recording trucks, a master cutting room, and the Record Plant Shop.

1. A & R Recording Inc.
  112 West 48th Street
  Opened by Jack Arnold and Phil Ramone 1959. Corner of 6th Avenue, next door to Jim & Andy's Bar (116 West 48th Street) and Manny's Music (156 West 48th Street), both famous musicians hangouts. Used regularly by Tom Dowd for Atlantic sessions and producer Creed Taylor for Verve. Van Morrison recorded "Brown Eyed Girl" there.
2. A & R Studio 2 (formerly Columbia Studio A)
  799 7th Avenue
  Opened by Jack Arnold and Phil Ramone early 1968
3. Associated Sound (now Quad Recording Studios)
  723 7th Avenue
  Near corner of West 48th Street, a few doors down from Dick Charles. The Angels' "My Boyfriend's Back," the Raindrops'
  "What A Guy" and The McCoys' "Hang On Sloopy" were cut there
4. Bell Sound (later The Hit Factory)
  237 West 54th Street
  Founded June 1950 by Allen Weintraub and Daniel Cronin (1929–1968), both classmates from Brooklyn Technical High School; studio was located at 135 West 54 beginning June 1959; Burt Bacharach's favorite studio. Bought by Jerry Ragovoy 1968 and reopened as The Hit Factory; sold 1975 to partner Eddie Germano (né Edward F. Germano; 1941–2003); now run by Troy George Germano (born 1962), his son.
5. Capitol Studios, Studio A (Capitol Records, Inc.)
  (the studio operated under Capitol from 1949 to 1961)
  (see Capitol Studios § 151 West 46th Street, New York)
  151 West 46th Street
  First floor (one floor up) in the 14-story Eaves Building (built in 1928). The Eaves Costume Company – founded by Albert Grammer Eaves (1847–1900) in 1863 (163 years ago), and still in existence – occupied the ground floor.
6. Century Sound
  135 West 52nd Street
  One flight up. Former radio studio. Opened by Brooks Arthur in 1967.
7. Columbia 30th Street
  207 East 30th Street
  Converted Armenian church. Opened 1949, closed mid-1982, torn-down, now an apartment building.
8. Columbia Studio A (later A & R Studio R2)
  799 7th Avenue
  Opened in the 1930s. Columbia's main facility prior to East 30th Street. Sold to A & R late 1967.
9. Columbia Studio B
  49 East 52nd Street
  Former site of CBS Radio Network building, near Madison Avenue. Opened late 1967.
10. Dick Charles Recording Service Inc.
  729 7th Avenue
  Small demo studio, in the United Artists building, near corner of West 48th Street, a few doors up from Associated Sound. Dick Charles Recording Inc., founded by Dick Charles (né Richard Charles Krieg; 1919–1998), was taken over in the 1980s by audio engineer Dick Charles (né Richard Charles Waldspurger; 1941–2002), who worked with him. Many of S'pop's favored songwriters recorded demos there. Engineer Jack Malken introduced Tommy Ramone to the studio and in February 1975, The Ramones recorded their first demos there. The studio also was contracted for all the demo work for music publishers Screen Gems, the company that provided many of the hits for The Monkees, with songwriters that included Neil Diamond, Gerry Goffin, and Carole King.
  1. Les Paul, Jr. (Lester George "Rusty" Paul, Jr.; 1941–2015) (engineer); Les Paul's son.
11. Master Cutting Room (MCR)
  250 West 49th Street
  (a Record Plant offshoot)
  Opened 1971, closed 2006
  Building demolished in 2022.
  1. Joe Brescio (mastering engineer)
  2. George Marino (mastering engineer) (1971–1973)
  3. Duncan Stanbury (April 1990 – April 1998)
  4. Kevin Hodge (1995–2005).
12. Mira Sound
  145-155 West 47th Street
  On the ground floor of the Hotel America, now a Euro-style hotel. Recorded there: "Remember (Walking in the Sand)" by The Shangri-Las and "Society's Child" by Janis Ian.
13. Power Station (known as Avatar Studios from 1996–2017).
  441 West 53rd Street
  Near 10th Avenue. Founded 1977 by Tony Bongiovi. Previously home to ConEdison (hence Power Station).
14. RCA Victor
  155 East 24th Street
  Near Lexington Avenue.
15. RCA Webster Hall
  125 11th Street
  In the East Village. Built late 1800s. Converted by RCA early 1950s. Now a nightclub.
16. The Record Plant (later Streetlight)
  321 West 44th Street
  Once home to Warner Brothers Pictures; opened by Gary Kellgren and Chris Stone in 1968.
17. Stea-Philips
  7th Avenue
  Corner 51st Street, close to Columbia Studio A and 1650 Broadway. Owner: Lenny Stea (né Leonard J. Stea; born 1928). The Four Seasons cut "Sherry" there.
18. Talentmasters Recording Studio
  126 West 42nd Street
  Owners: Bob Gallo and Robert (Bob) Harvey. Later bought out by Atlantic
  The Who recorded there.
19. World United
  1595 Broadway
  Owner: Harry Lookofsky, aka Hash Brown, father of Michael Brown of The Left Banke, who recorded "Walk Away Renée" there.
20. JAC Recording, Inc.
  152 West 58th Street
  Owner: Charles Leighton
  This is where Phil Ramone got his start.
21. Allegro Sound Studios
  1650 Broadway
  Owner (original): Kama Sutra Records This was actually on the 51st Street side of the 1650 Broadway building, located in the basement, around the corner from the famous jazz club Birdland. Originally a demo studio for Kama Sutra, it was then purchased by Laurie Records, who gave it an extensive upgrade under chief engineer Bruce Staple. After several changes in ownership, it became known as Generation Sound Studios in the 1970s. Many of the Tommy James hits were recorded there, including I Think We're Alone Now and Crimson And Clover. After the departure of Bruce Staple, Tony May of A&R became chief engineer.

== Personnel ==
In 1972, management of A & R included Robert Gerics (general manager & studio manager), Nick Diminno (studio manager), and Irving Joel (chief engineer). The studio was located at 322 West 48th Street.

Management and shareholders

A & R Recording Inc.

- Art Ward (1922–2002), president of the parent company.
- Phil Ramone, vice president & creative director.
- John Gordy, around 1970, became president of Visual Sounds, Inc. (VSI), A & R's video subsidiary. Gordy – on July 1, 1972, in Blue Hill, Maine, married, his second of three, Jean Becton DeMeritt, a 1965 graduate of Vassar College and granddaughter of Maxwell Becton, co-founder of Becton Dickinson, a multinational medical device manufacturer. Gordy's father, Papa John Gordy (né John Thomas Gordy; 1904–1961), a dixieland jazz musician, was for more than 25 years, musical director of The Noon Show on station WSM, the NBC Radio Network affiliate in Nashville.
- Don Frey (né Donald Elias Frey; born 1927) had been a senior sound mixer at NBC TV in the late 1950s. He became vice president of operations at A & R Recording and ended-up being a partner at A & R for 25 years. He personally engineered sessions for Ray Charles, Nina Simone, Ike and Tina Turner, and many others. During the 1960s, Frey engineered some of the biggest commercials of the decade at A & R, including one of the Yankees theme and ads for Marlboro and Pepsi. Frey's recording sessions involved 40 and 50 people in the room. Frey, in 1988, was instrumental in rebuilding BMG's Studio A in New York. According to a 1978 trade magazine article by studio engineer Malcolm Addey, Frey, while a mixer at NBC TV, had been moonlighting at A & R and did a lot of the installation work. His work there became more than he could handle on a part-time basis and he accepted an invitation to work full-time. Don was eventually invited to invest and became vice president in charge of operations.
- Brooks Arthur Productions, Inc., founded in 1999 as a California corporation, is active and based in Encino, California, and is headed by Arthur.

A & R Records (subsidiary)

- Ed Barsky (né Edward Sydney Barsky; 1924–1993), president of A & R Records, based in Los Angeles (founded 1970)
- Irving "Bud" Dain, vice president of A&R and promotion
- Harriet Margulies (1926–1921), public relations (worked from New York)

Engineers

- Brooks Arthur, engineer
- John Curcio, engineer
- Roy Cicala, engineer
- Ami Hadani
- Charlie "Chaz" Clifton, engineer
- David Greene, engineer, producer
- Roy Halley, engineer
- David Crawford, mastering engineer
- Tom Hidley
- Irving Joel (né Irving Lewis Joel; 1931–2015), chief engineer, 1968–1974
- Bob Ludwig, mastering engineer
- Tony May, engineer
- Elliot Scheiner, engineer, worked 7 years at A & R
- Bill Schwartau (né William H. Schwartau; 1926–1985) appointed Chief Engineer at A & R Recording, December 1958
- Norman Schwartz (1928–1995), studio technician & sound consultant
- David Smith (né David Michael Smith; 1949–2006), chief engineer. Ramone, in his 2007 book, Making Records, included a dedication following the title page, "In Memory of David Smith, 1951–2006."
- Fred Weinberg, engineer, producer
- William Earl Windsor (1927–2017), chief engineer, 1966–1968
- Shelly Yakus, engineer

Studio managers

- Nick Diminno, studio manager
- Robert Gerics, general manager & studio manager
- Mitch Plotkin, studio manager

== Bibliography ==
=== References ===
- Addey, Malcolm Thomas (December 1978). "Studio Diary" → "A & R Recording, New York" (PDF). Studio Sound. Vol. 20, no. 12. pp. 32, 34 – via American Radio History, maintained by David Frackelton Gleason (born 1946), Cleveland. ISSN 0144-5944
  Note: Addey is a prolific recording studio audio engineer known for is work with The Beatles at Abbey Road Studios.
- Atkinson, John (June 25, 2006). "David Smith, 1951–2006". Stereophile.
- Billboard (December 15, 1958). "A & R Recording Incorporated". Billboard (tombstone advertisement). Vol. 70, no. 50. p. 81.
- Billboard; Radcliffe, Joe (September 19, 1970). "1972 A&R Studios Setting Up Small Satellites". Billboard. Vol. 82, no. 38. pp. 3, 8 – via Google Books.
- Billboard (October 24, 1974). "Fla. Studio Opening Marks A&R 'Bring Facility to Artists' Move". Billboard. Vol. 82, no. 43. p. 10 – via Google Books.
- Billboard (June 10, 1972). "1972 International Directory of Recording Studios". Billboard. Vol. 84, no. 24. pp. RS-38 – via Google Books.
- Billboard (December 14, 1974). "A Guide to New York City Studios". Billboard. Vol. 86, no. 50. p. 46 – via Google Books.
- Billboard; Barnes, Mike (March 30, 2013). "Legendary Producer Phil Ramone Dies at Age 79". Billboard.
- Cashbox (October 18, 1969). "Hahn Named V.P. of A&R Recording". Cashbox. Cash Box Pub. Co. p. 14 – via Internet Archive (Andrew W. Mellon Foundation; College of William & Mary Libraries).
- Cashbox (November 28, 1970). "A&R Coast Office; Barsky Relocates". Cashbox. Vol. 32, no. 23. Cash Box Pub. Co. p. 7 – via Internet Archive (Council on Library and Information Resources, Andrew W. Mellon Foundation, College of William and Mary).
- Cerra, Steven A. (19 November 2017). "Jim and Andy's: A Musician's Bar". Jazz Profiles.
- Chester, John (December 2015). "Obituaries" "Irving Joel, 1931–2015" (PDF). Journal of the Audio Engineering Society. Vol. 63, no. 12. pp. 1067–1068.
- Cogan, Jim; Clark, William (2003). Temples of Sound: Inside the Great Recording Studios. San Francisco: Chronicle Books. ISBN 9780811833943 – via Internet Archive (Kahle/Austin Foundation). LCCN 2002-4425; OCLC 49553469 (all editions).
- Eskow, Gary (June 1, 2005). "Classic Tracks: Janis Ian's 'At Seventeen'". Mix.
- Gottlieb, Gary (2010). How Does It Sound Now?. Course Technology. p. 57. ISBN 1-5986-3921-8, 978-1-5986-3921-6; OCLC 535576372 (all editions) (pdf copy).
- Hinton, Milt; Berger, David G. (2008). Playing The Changes: Milt Hinton's Life in Stories and Photographs. Vanderbilt University Press. LCCN 2007-30389; ISBN 978-0-8265-1574-2; OCLC 156975394 (all editions).
- Jung, Tom (August 2006). "The High End" "David Smith: A True Loss to Our Industry" (PDF). Pro Audio Review. Vol. 11, no. 8. p. 32 – via American Radio History, maintained by David Frackelton Gleason (born 1946), Cleveland.
- Lavry, Dan (December 2015). "In Memorium: David Smith, AES Fellow" (PDF). Journal of the Audio Engineering Society. Vol. 54, no. 9. p. 891.
- Lees, Gene (1988). Meet Me at Jim & Andy's: Jazz Musicians and Their World. Oxford University Press. p. 7. ISBN 978-0-19-504611-3 – via Internet Archive (ARChive of Contemporary Music). LCCN 88-4865ISBN 0-1950-4611-0, 978-0-1950-4611-3; OCLC 17677072 (all editions).
- "Master Cutting Room". Discogs. n.d.f.
- "Master Cutting Room". MusicBrainz.
- New York Times (The) (September 23, 1950). "Manhattan Transfers" → "48th St. 112–114 W.". The New York Times. Vol. 100, no. 33845 (Late City ed.). p. 24 (col. 6, middle) – via TimesMachine (permalink).
- New York Times (The) (October 16, 1967). "Studio Space Leased".
- New York Times (The) (April 16, 1972). "John Gordy, Ex-Football Star, to Wed Mrs. Jean DeMeritt". The New York Times. Vol. 121, no. 41721 (Late City ed.). p. 63 – via TimesMachine (permalink).
- Ramone, Phil; Granata, Charles L. (2007). Making Records: The Scenes Behind the Music (1st ed.). New York: Hyperion Books. pp. 136–137. ISBN 9780786868599 – via Internet Archive (Kahle/Austin Foundation). LCCN 2008-298328; ISBN 0-7868-6859-7, 978-0-7868-6859-9; OCLC 174143979 (all editions).
- Simons, Dave (2004). Studio Stories: How the Great New York Records Were Made: From Miles to Madonna, Sinatra to the Ramones. (ARChive of Contemporary Music). Backbeat Books. ISBN 9780879308179.
- Toronto Audio Engineering Society Bulletin (monthly). Toronto Section of the Audio Engineering Society.
1. McCluskie, Earl (April 2016). April Regular Meeting: "Audio Recording at the Eastman School of Music:" Comment No. 4 (Toronto Audio Engineering Society: April 2016 Bulletin). Facility Tour & Retrospective of the Summer Recording Institutes 1968–1986: April 23, 2016, Eastman School of Music. Archived from the original on February 17, 2025.
- Variety; Yuma, Jennifer (November 8, 2021). "NCIS Pays 'In Memoriam' Tribute to Longtime Staffer Harriet Margulies". Variety (re: NCIS).
- Wasserman, Herb (2000). A Different Drummer: What Makes Me Tic, a Memoir. San Jose, California: Writers Club Press. p. 134. ISBN 9780595147267. OCLC 52229234 – via Google Books (limited preview)..
- Who's Who in the World, 1997. "Windsor, William Earl" (14th ed.). Marquis Who's Who, Inc. 1997. ISBN 9780837911175 – via Internet Archive (Kahle/Austin Foundation). LCCN 79-139215; ISSN 0083-9825; ISBN 08379-1117-6 (Classic ed.); ISBN 0-8379-1118-4 (Delux ed.); OCLC 01133198 (all editions).
- Young, Clive (October 16, 2020). "Recording Engineer Donald C. Hahn Passes at 81". Mix. ISSN 0164-9957.
