= Hotcha Trio =

Dutch harmonica ensemble

The Hotcha Trio was a harmonica ensemble from the Netherlands that made many records in the 1950s.

It was formed in Rotterdam in the mid-1930s and dissolved in 1970.

The first band was called The 5 Hotchas and had Geert van Driesten (bass), Joop Heijman (solo), Eddie Sernee and the brothers Cor and Wim Belder. They toured Europe in 1939. In 1941, van Driesten left the band, and was replaced by Johan Janssen. They continued touring Scandinavia and Germany and was featured in a German movie. The quintet ended in 1949, and was replaced by The Hotcha Trio, initially with van Driesten, Sernee and Heijman. Henk van Dipte replaced van Driesten on bass, and this was the start of its most successful period. Van Dipte was replaced by Lee Kuipers on bass, and Kuipers was replaced by Gijs van der Wiel. Jan Vuik joined in 1954. The band dissolved around 1970.
