= JAC Recording, Inc. =

Coordinates: 40.76566°N 73.97861°W

JAC Recording, Inc., was a small American recording studio based in New York City at 152 West 58th Street. It was founded in the 1950s by Charles Leighton, a virtuoso classical and jazz harmonica player, who, in the 1950s, took on Jack Arnold as a partner, who also was a pianist. The JAC acronym stood for "Jack and Charlie." The studio was Leighton's personal residence — apartment 8D.

Phil Ramone, a prolific recording engineer, entrepreneur, founder, and co-owner of A & R Recording Inc., was first mentored in the art of studio engineering by Leighton at JAC in the late 1950s. Ramone had left JAC in 1958 to start his own recording studio with the help of Jack Arnold, as partner. The "A & R" stood for Arnold and Ramone.

== History ==
The early years of JAC were devoted to jingles and demos. In the early 1980s, Leighton began recording jazz and blues artist.

== Selected recording artists ==
- Lew Anderson (1983)
- Phil Bodner
- Walter Bolden
- Frank Capp
- Buck Clayton
- Jimmy Cobb
- Hank Crawford
- Dardanelle Hadley

(née Marcia Marie Mullen; 1917–1997)

- George Duvivier
- Helen Forrest
- Morgana King
- Peggy King
- Gene Krupa
- Junior Mance
- George Masso
- Butch Miles
- Anne Marie Moss
- David "Fathead" Newman
- Joe Newman
- New York Saxophone Quartet

Ray Beckenstein
Dennis Anderson
Billy Kerr
Wally Kane

- Red Norvo
- Mary Osborne
- Charlie Persip
- Bucky Pizzarelli
- Jimmy Ponder
- Carmel Quinn
- Martin Rivera
- Jimmy Rowles
- Sara Rubine
- Neil Sedaka
- Herbie Steward
- Slam Stewart
- Sonny Stitt (1982)
- Marlene VerPlanck
- Eddie Cleanhead Vinson (1982)
- Bill Watrous (1983)
- Carla White

Audio drama

- Flash Gordon, Vols. 1 & 2, Wonderland Records (1979)

== Videos of Charles Leighton playing harmonica ==
- Flight of the Bumble Bee (Cappy Lafell, soloist; Leighton is part of the ensemble)
- Cappy Barra Boys Harmonica Quartet from the 1945 film, Rockin' in the Rockies
- Tuesdays at Charlie Leighton's with Will Galison, Charlie Spranklin, Randy Weinstein, and Rob Paparozzi

== Affiliated audio engineers ==
- Jack Arnold
- Don Frey
- Charles Leighton
- Phil Ramone
- Bill Schwartau (né William H. Schwartau; 1926–1985) (appointed Chief Engineer at A & R Recording, December 1958)
