= Marlene VerPlanck =

American jazz musician

Marlene Paula VerPlanck (née Pampinella; November 11, 1933 – January 14, 2018) was an American jazz and pop vocalist whose body of work centered on big band jazz, the American songbook, and cabaret.

== Life and career ==
VerPlanck was born and raised in Newark, New Jersey, the eldest of three siblings. Her father, Anthony J. Pampinella, operated a gasoline station there, and her mother was Pauline A. Biase, whose family ran an Italian restaurant. She married trombonist, composer, and arranger J. William "Billy" VerPlanck (1930–2009) in 1955, and he became her musical collaborator and champion. They were married for 52 years, until his death in 2009.

VerPlank graduated from Bloomfield High School, and considered a career in journalism. She began performing as a teenager at the age of 19, at a nightclub in Newark, the Well. Her debut album, I Think of You with Every Breath I Take, was released in 1955 when she was 21, and featured Hank Jones, Joe Wilder, Wendell Marshall, Kenny Clarke, and Herbie Mann (uncredited). VerPlanck then went to work as a vocalist for Charlie Spivak's band, and later sang with the Tommy Dorsey band and with Tex Beneke′s band.

A prolific studio vocalist for commercial jingles during the 1960s and 1970s, Ver Planck was once dubbed "the New York jingle queen" by Los Angeles Times jazz writer Leonard Feather. She recorded thousands of jingles, often for low pay, although her fortunes changed when she sang an arrangement of the 1930s Campbell's Soup "M'm M'm Good" song, which became widely known. Other notable jingles she recorded included "Nationwide is on your side" for the Nationwide Mutual Insurance Company and "Weekends were made for Michelob" for Anheuser-Busch′s Michelob beer. She later told the press that the latter was highly lucrative for her, because she put a "Yeah!" at the end of the jingle that was used over and over again in versions of the jingle recorded by Billy Eckstine, Vic Damone, and Brook Benton, earning her continued royalties. Her jingle work allowed her to hone the clarity of her diction when singing, and she became known for her ability to enunciate the lyrics of songs clearly even while investing them with emotion. Although she toiled largely in obscurity, her voice became widely known to millions of people during the 1960s and 1970s through the familiarity and popularity of her jingles.

VerPlanck also sang backup for Tony Bennett, Perry Como, Frank Sinatra, and Mel Torme, and she performed around the United States and internationally as a cabaret singer. Despite her long and successful career in jingles and as a studio backing vocalist, her second solo album, This Happy Feeling, was not recorded and released until 1969, 14 years after her first album. Her solo career then began in earnest, and she released more than 20 albums, mostly on the Audiophile label, and toured extensively as a soloist. She specialized in the Great American Songbook, especially the works of Irving Berlin, Jerome Kern, Johnny Mercer, Cole Porter, and Richard Rodgers, and gained a reputation as one of the most accomplished interpreters of the genre.

In January 1983, VerPlanck took part in recording In the Digital Mood, an early all-digital recording of the music of Glenn Miller by the Glenn Miller Orchestra. The album included two vocal tracks – "Chattanooga Choo-Choo" and "(I've Got a Gal In) Kalamazoo", and VerPlanck was invited to sing the female vocals in a recreation of the singing group The Modernaires, which consisted of one female and four male vocalists, and to bring four male colleagues with her to sing the four male vocal parts. The album's producers expected her to bring unknown session and back-up singers with her, but she surprised and delighted the producers and the orchestra by arriving with Julius LaRosa, Mel Torme, Michael Mark, and Marty Nelson for the recording session on January 20, 1983.

VerPlanck last performed in December 2017 at a jazz club in New York City. She died of pancreatic cancer at a hospital in Manhattan, New York City on January 14, 2018, aged 84 and was buried at Mt. Olivet cemetery in Bloomfield.

== Discography ==
=== As leader ===
- I Think of You with Every Breath I Take (Savoy, 1956)
- A Breath of Fresh Air (Mounted, 1968)
- This Happy Feeling (Mounted, 1969)
- You'd Better Love Me (Audiophile, 1977)
- Marlene VerPlanck Loves Johnny Mercer (Audiophile, 1978)
- A New York Singer (Audiophile, 1980)
- A Warmer Place (Audiophile, 1982)
- I Like to Sing! (Audiophile, 1984)
- All Aglow Again with Steve Clayton (Sovereign, 1986)
- Marlene VerPlanck Sings Alec Wilder (Audiophile, 1986)
- Pure & Natural (Audiophile, 1987)
- A Quiet Storm (Audiophile, 1990)
- Live! in London (Audiophile, 1993)
- You Gotta Have Heart: The Songs of Richard Adler (Varese Sarabande, 1997)
- What Are We Going to Do with All This Moonlight? (Audiophile, 1998)
- My Impetuous Heart (DRG, 2000)
- Speaking of Love (Audiophile, 2002)
- It's How You Play the Game (Audiophile, 2004)
- Now (Audiophile, 2005)
- Once There Was a Moon (Audiophile, 2009)
- One Dream at a Time (Audiophile, 2010)
- Ballads, Mostly (Audiophile, 2013)
- I Give Up, I'm in Love (Audiophile, 2014)
- The Mood I'm In (Audiophile, 2016)

=== As guest or part of ensemble ===
With J. J. Johnson

- Goodies (RCA Victor, 1965)

With the John LaSalle Quartet

- Jumpin' at the Left Bank (Capitol, 1959)
- Potluck (Capitol, 1959)

With the Glenn Miller Orchestra

- In the Digital Mood (GRP, 1983)
