= Rob Paparozzi =

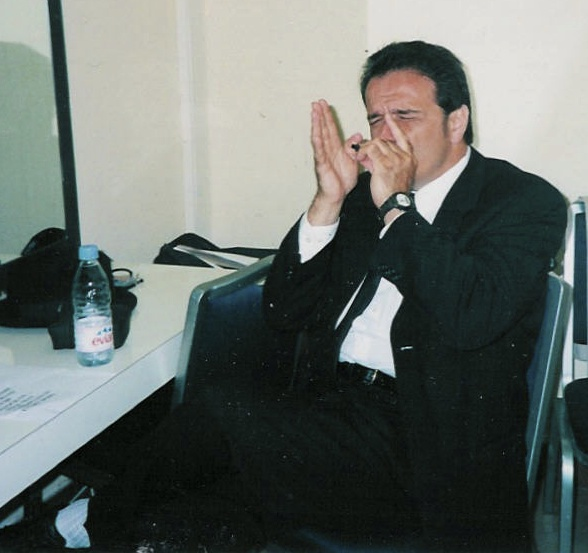
- Rob Paparozzi with The Original Blues Brothers Band in Monaco

Background information
- Also known as: Rob Paparozzi
- Born: Robert Steven Paparozzi; October 14, 1952 (age 74); Newark, New Jersey, US
- Genres: Blues, blues rock, jazz, pop
- Occupation: Musician
- Instruments: Harmonica, vocals
- Years active: 1967–present

Robert Steven "Rob" Paparozzi (born October 14, 1952) is an American Grammy-nominated harmonica player and vocalist from New Jersey.

In the early 1970s, Paparozzi fronted the Psychotic Blues Band, a blues rock group which played extensively in the New Jersey area, opening several times for Bruce Springsteen. He has toured with Dolly Parton, George Jones, and has contributed to works by Whitney Houston, Judy Collins, Cyndi Lauper and Bobby McFerrin, among others. He is a former member of The Original Blues Brothers Band and is the singer for the reformed Blood, Sweat & Tears. When not touring with Blood, Sweat & Tears, Paparozzi leads his own band, the Hudson River Rats, which sometimes features famed funk drummer, Bernard Purdie. The Hudson River Rats have released two CDs, First Take (1994) and Get It While You Can (1999). In 2009, Paparozzi released a solo CD entitled, Etruscan Soul.

In 2019, Paparozzi continued to tour Steve Cropper and the Blues Brothers Band and contributed to their final release, Last Shade of Blue Before Black, on Severn Records. In February He performed at New York's City Center with The Encores production of Big River.

In May 2017, he made his debut as guest soloist with the New York Philharmonic Orchestra at the Lincoln Center. On May 1, 2018, he joined the Lincoln Center WBGO GALA, with Jeff Beck and Donald Fagen.

Paparozzi served as one of two harmonica coaches for actor Timothée Chalamet for his Golden Globe nominated performance as Bob Dylan in the 2024 film, A Complete Unknown.

His credits include work on Broadway for shows such as Big River and The Will Rogers Follies; films including Flirting with Disaster and Ride; television programs such as the Bill Cosby Show, CBS Early Show and the David Letterman Show; appearances in 2006 with Dolly Parton and George Jones on Conan O'Brien and David Letterman's Late Show. In 2009, Paparozzi performed a duet with Bernadette Peters (harmonica and vocals on "Shenandoah" at the Minskoff Theatre in New York City. He has also been involved in musical work for television advertisement jingles.
